= LMS Pacifics =

LMS Railway (and later BR) locomotives with 4-6-2 wheel arrangement

The London Midland and Scottish Railway and its successor British Railways built 52 express passenger steam locomotives with a pacific 4-6-2 wheel arrangement. Four classes were built - the LMS Princess Royal Class (1933-1935), LMS Turbomotive, later rebuilt as Princess Anne, and the LMS Coronation Class (1937-1948). All were built at Crewe Works. They were used principally on express passenger trains on the West Coast Main Line between Euston and Glasgow.

== Overview ==
Class	Number in class	Dates	LMS numbers	BR numbers	Notes
Princess Royal Class	12	1933-1962	6200-1, 6203-12	46200-1, 46203-12	
Turbomotive	1	1935-1952	6202	46202	
Coronation Class	38	1937-1964	6220-6256	46220-46257	Some streamlined. Last one built under BR.
Princess Anne	1	1952	n/a	46202	Rebuild of the Turbomotive. Lasted only 2 months before being destroyed in a crash

== Preservation ==
Two Princesses and three Duchesses have been preserved.

Number		Name	Built	Withdrawn	Service life	Livery	Location	Owners	Status	Notes
LMS	BR	Name	Built	Withdrawn	Service life	Livery	Location	Owners	Status	Notes
6201	46201	Princess Elizabeth	Nov 1933	Oct 1962	28 years, 11 months	LMS Crimson Lake	Carnforth MPD	6201 Princess Elizabeth Society	Undergoing boiler repairs	Retube required following multiple tube problems alongside boiler and firebox issues. Possibly new boiler ticket as well as mainline ticket.
6203	46203	Princess Margaret Rose	Jul 1935	Oct 1962	27 years, 3 months	BR Crimson Lake, Late Crest	Butterley	Princess Royal Class Locomotive Trust	Static display	
6229	46229	Duchess of Hamilton								
6233	46233	Duchess of Sutherland								
6235	46235	City of Birmingham								

== See also ==
- LNER Pacifics
