= LMS Princess Royal Class 6201 Princess Elizabeth =

Class of steam train formerly used in Britain

6201 Princess Elizabeth
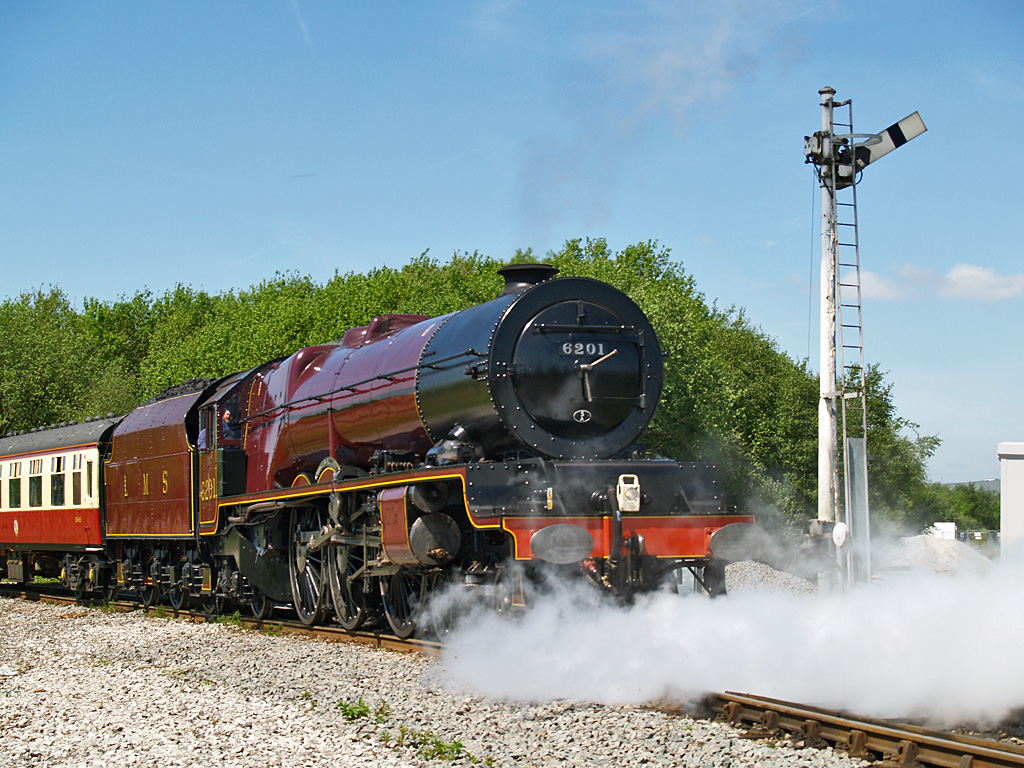
- 6201 Princess Elizabeth at Castleton South Junction.
Type and origin
- Power type: Steam
- Designer: William Stanier
- Builder: Crewe Works
- Build date: November 1933
Specifications
- Configuration
  - Whyte: 4-6-2
  - UIC: 2′C1′ h4
- Gauge: 4 ft 8 1/2 in (1,435 mm)
- Leading dia.: 3 ft 0 in (1 m)
- Driver dia.: 6 ft 6 in (2 m)
- Trailing dia.: 3 ft 9 in (1 m)
- Minimum curve: 6 chains (121 m) normal; 4 1/2 chains (91 m) dead slow
- Wheelbase: 63 ft 10 in (19.456 m)
  - Engine: 37 ft 9 in (11.506 m)
  - Drivers: 15 ft 3 in (4.648 m)
  - Tender: 15 ft 0 in (4.572 m)
- Length: 74 ft 4 1/4 in (22.663 m)
- Width: 9 ft 0 in (2.743 m)
- Height: 13 ft 3 in (4.039 m)
- Axle load: 22.50 long tons (22.86 t)
  - Leading: 21.00 long tons (21.34 t)
  - Coupled: 22.50 long tons (22.86 t)
  - Trailing: 16.00 long tons (16.26 t)
  - Tender axle: Front: 18.60 long tons (18.90 t); Middle: 17.80 long tons (18.09 t); Rear: 18.25 long tons (18.54 t)
- Adhesive weight: 67.50 long tons (68.58 t)
- Loco weight: 104.50 long tons (117.04 short tons; 106.18 t); 46202: 110.55 long tons (123.82 short tons; 112.32 t)
- Tender weight: 54.65 long tons (61.21 short tons; 55.53 t)
- Fuel type: Coal
- Fuel capacity: 9.00 long tons (10.08 short tons; 9.14 t); later 10.00 long tons (11.20 short tons; 10.16 t)
- Water cap.: 4,000 imp gal (18,000 L; 4,800 US gal)
- Firebox
  - Grate area: 45 sq ft (4.2 m^{2})
- Boiler
  - Model: LMS type 1
  - Tube plates: 19 ft 3 in (5.867 m)
  - Small tubes: 2 3/8 in (60 mm), 32 off
  - Large tubes: 5 1/8 in (130 mm), 123 off
- Boiler pressure: 250 psi (1.7 MPa)
- Heating surface
  - Firebox: 190 or 217 sq ft (17.7 or 20.2 m^{2})
  - Tubes and flues: 2,299 sq ft (213.6 m^{2})
- Superheater
  - Heating area: 584 sq ft (54.3 m^{2})
- Cylinders: 4
- Cylinder size: 16 1/4 in × 28 in (413 mm × 711 mm)
- Valve gear: Walschaerts
Performance figures
- Maximum speed: 25 mph (40 km/h) - (heritage railways) 45 mph (72 km/h) - (main line, tender first) 75 mph (121 km/h) - (main line, chimney first)
- Tractive effort: 40,286 lbf (179.20 kN)
Career
- Operators: London, Midland and Scottish Railway; British Railways
- Power class: 7P reclassified 8P in 1951
- Locale: London Midland Region
- Withdrawn: October 1962
- Current owner: 6201 Princess Elizabeth Locomotive Society Ltd
- Disposition: Undergoing Overhaul

6201 Princess Elizabeth is a preserved steam locomotive in England. It is one of two preserved LMS Princess Royal Class; the other being 46203 Princess Margaret Rose.

== Service ==
6201 was built in November 1933 at the London, Midland & Scottish Railway's (LMS) Crewe Works, the second of its class. It was named after the 7-year-old elder daughter of Prince Albert, Duke of York (later King George VI), Princess Elizabeth (later Queen Elizabeth II). Despite the class officially being named after 6200 Princess Royal, the class received the nickname "Lizzies" after 6201.

After nationalisation in 1948, British Railways (BR) renumbered it 46201. It was withdrawn in October 1962. During its working career for the LMS it wore the famous LMS Crimson Lake livery (this livery is also what it has worn for most of its preserved career), alongside this it even wore LMS black. During its career with BR it wore both brunswick green and black, both of which were lined.

== Allocations ==
The shed locations of 6201/46201 during its career with the LMS and BR on particular dates.

Shed allocations
Location	Shed code	From
Camden	W1	3 November 1933
Polmadie	27A	6 January 1934
Camden	1B	24 June 1939
Longsight	9A	15 July 1939
Camden	1B	16 September 1939
Edge Hill	8A	21 October 1939
Crewe North	5A	5 October 1940
Edge Hill	8A	20 May 1944
Crewe North	5A	24 March 1945
Edge Hill	8A	11 December 1948
Crewe North	5A	13 June 1953
Polmadie	66A	24 July 1958
Carlisle Kingmoor	12A	11 March 1961
Carlisle Upperby	12B	27 January 1962
Withdrawn		20 October 1962

== Preservation ==
Following withdrawal in November 1962, 46201 was bought by the then Princess Elizabeth Locomotive Society straight from service. Initially it was kept at the Dowty Railway Preservation Society's premises at Ashchurch, and then subsequently at the Bulmers Railway Centre in Hereford. When the Bulmers Centre closed in 1993, the loco moved to the Midland Railway Centre, Butterley. An overhaul of the locomotive and tender was started there, but with most work spread between both the Tyseley Locomotive Works and Riley & Son in Bury, the locomotive was not completed until 2002.

After a brief spell at Crewe Heritage Centre in 2009, it was withdrawn from service in July 2012 for a piston and valve examination at the Tyseley Locomotive Works, and after repairs it returned to service on 17 November hauling the Vintage Trains' Cumbrian Mountaineer working the train from Carnforth to Carlisle via the West Coast Main Line and then returned via the Settle-Carlisle line from Carlisle to Crewe where a diesel took the train to Tyseley. It was withdrawn for overhaul at the end of December 2012 having completed its longest period of operation in preservation. It returned to steam in June 2015 after a heavy overhaul and was featured in Tyseley's open weekend on Saturday 27 and Sunday 28 June 2015. It would not be until 2016 that it would return to service on the main line, following which it was based down in London at Southall Railway Centre working rail tours in the southern half of the UK.

On 23 August 2016, Princess Elizabeth hauled its inaugural main line train of the Steam Dreams' Cathedrals Express from London Victoria to Minehead on the West Somerset Railway via Ascot, Reading and Newbury and return.

It was withdrawn from service in late 2016 due to multiple problems being found with the locomotive's boiler and it was decided to carry out the repairs at the Princess Royal Class Locomotive Trust's (PRCLT) West Shed at Butterley in Derbyshire. The repair work was later transferred to Carnforth. 6201 returned to service in 2019 and is now part of West Coast Railways pool of engines based at Carnforth MPD for trips in the north of Britain.

== Diamond Jubilee and Royal Train ==
As part of the Diamond Jubilee of Elizabeth II, on 3 June 2012, after arriving in London with a Vintage Trains rail tour from Tyseley heading to Kensington Olympia, Princess Elizabeth's whistle signalled the start of the Thames Diamond Jubilee Pageant while the locomotive was standing on Battersea Railway Bridge. The Queen was made aware of the locomotive and waved to the crew on the footplate.

On 11 July, Princess Elizabeth hauled the Royal Train from Newport to Hereford and again from Worcester to Oxford as part of the Diamond Jubilee Tour. The loco carried the traditional four-lamp combination (one lamp at the top of the smokebox and three on the buffer lamp irons) used on trains conveying the Head of State, although no headboard was carried. It was only the second time in preservation that the Queen had been conveyed on a steam-hauled Royal Train on the main line, the other occasion in 2002 was also with an LMS locomotive but one of the bigger LMS Coronation Class locomotives No. 6233 Duchess of Sutherland. 6201 was the standby engine for the 2002 royal train. It is believed that it was the first time that the Queen had travelled behind the locomotive that was named after her and the event came just a few weeks before the 50th anniversary of the preservation of the loco, which has been owned by the Princess Elizabeth Locomotive Society longer than under both the LMS and British Railways together which owned the engine from 1933 until 1962 (29 year working life).

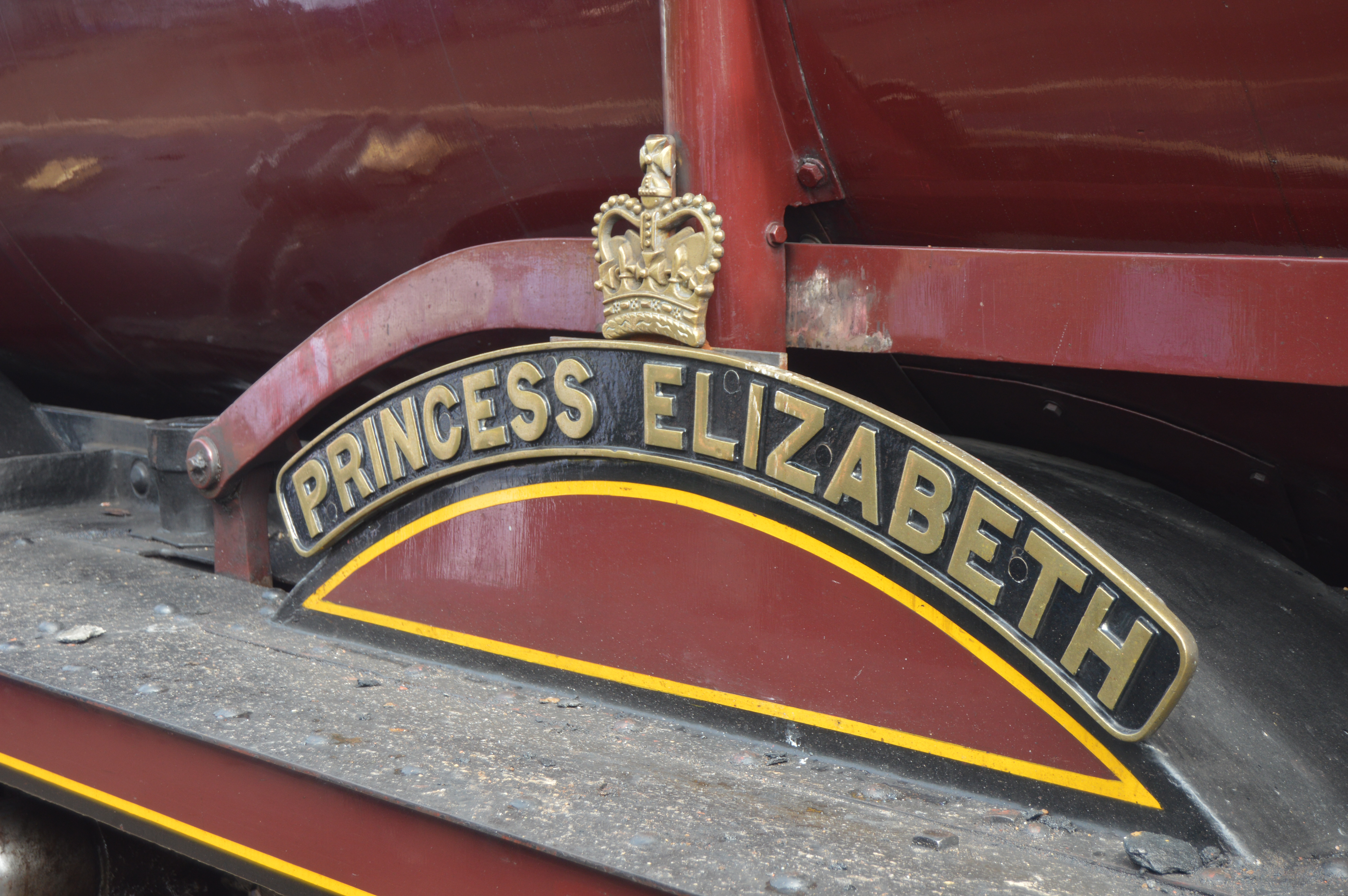
Princess Elizabeth's nameplate with the crown placed above, showing the engine has worked the royal train.

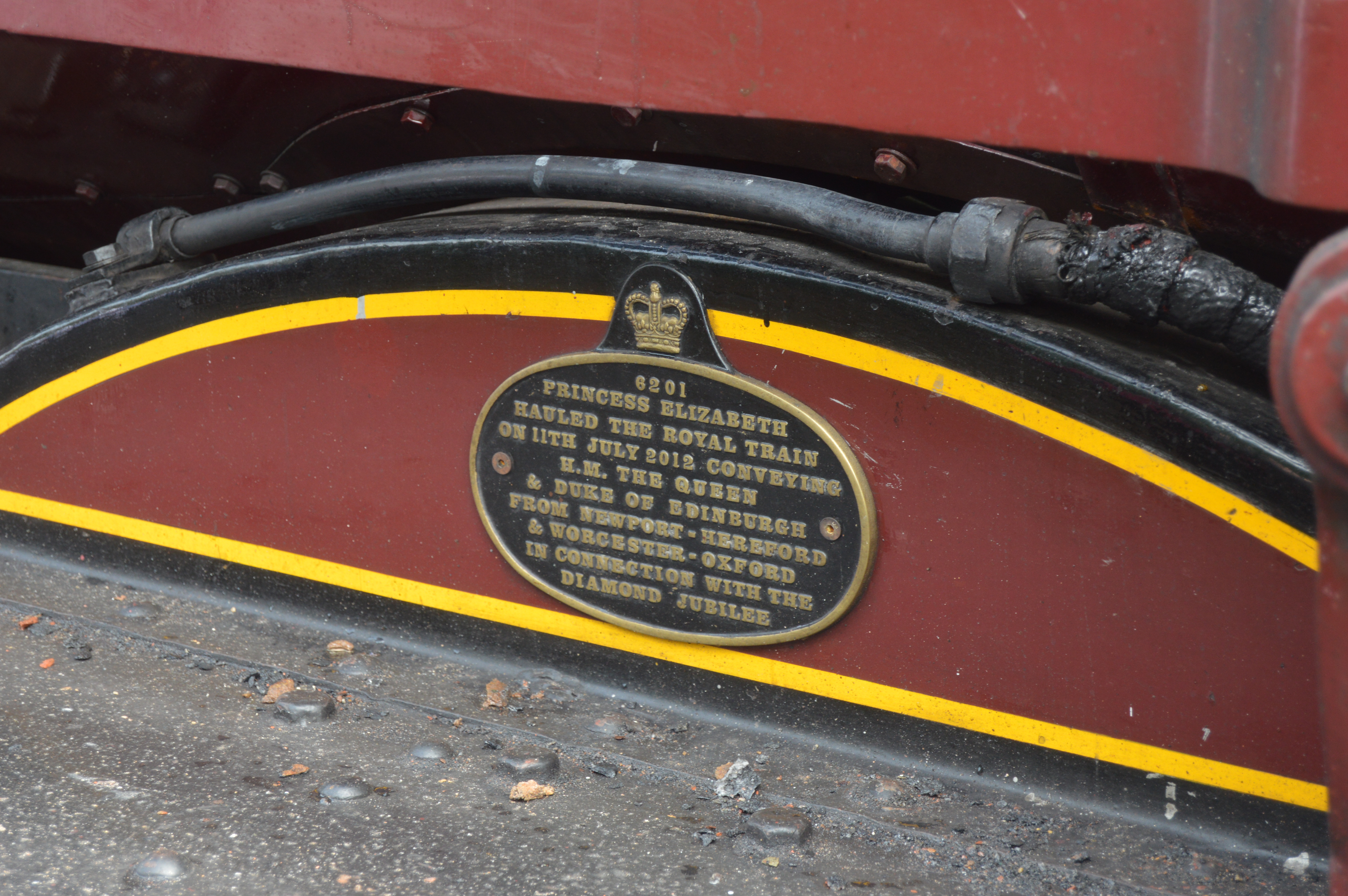
The plaque placed on 6201 to mark the occasion that it hauled the royal train for HM Queen Elizabeth II.

== Current status ==
From 2016, 6201 was located at PRCLT's West Shed at Butterley in Derbyshire. On 22 February 2018 it was moved to Carnforth MPD for boiler repairs and other general maintenance by West Coast Railways. The move from Butterley to Carnforth was completed by two West Coast Railways Class 37 diesel locomotives.

In September 2023 it was announced that following two years of storage at Carnforth after the engine was withdrawn from traffic in October 2021 due to leaks in the engine's firebox throatplate, a start has been made on 6201's next overhaul. In March 2024, it was announced by the owners that an assessment is ongoing to estimate the cost of the overhaul and dismantling of the engine is now underway. The overhaul will include a full retube alongside repairs or replacement of worn parts and attention to the firebox throatplate.
