= Winona Cargile Alexander =

American sorority founder (1893–1984)

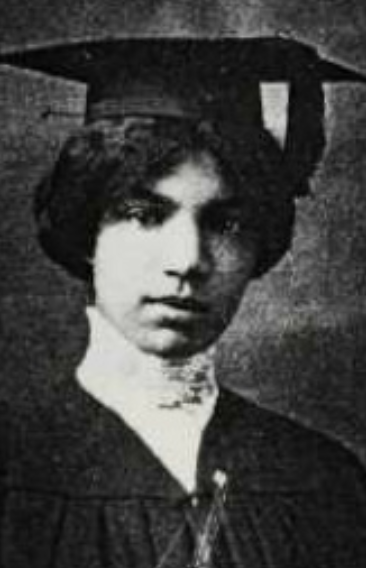
- Winona Cargile, 1914 Howard University yearbook photograph
- Born: Winona Lucile Cargile; June 21, 1893; Columbus, Georgia, US
- Died: October 16, 1984 (age 91); Jacksonville, Florida, U.S.
- Education: Ballard Normal High School, Macon, Georgia (1910) Howard University (B.A., 1914) New York School of Philanthropy (M.S.W., 1916)
- Occupations: Educator; Social Worker
- Employer(s): Duval County Welfare Board, Travelers Aid, Brewster Hospital
- Spouse: Edward L. Alexander (m. 1917–1943)
- Children: 2 sons (4 daughters died during birth)

Winona Cargile Alexander (June 21, 1893 – October 16, 1984) was a founder of Delta Sigma Theta sorority at Howard University on January 13, 1913. It was the second sorority founded by African-American women and was influential in women's building civic institutions and charities. In 1915, she was the first African-American admitted to the New York School of Philanthropy (now Columbia University's School of Social Work), where she received a graduate fellowship for her studies. She was the first African-American hired as a social worker in New York.

== Early life and education ==
Winona Lucile Cargile was born in Columbus, Georgia, on June 21, 1893, as the second of four daughters to Sarah Frances (Fannie) Sloan Cargile and Rev. Charles H. Cargile. Her father, an African Methodist Episcopal (AME) minister and Howard University divinity school graduate, vigorously supported a thorough education for each of his daughters as well as a steadfast faith in Christianity.

Winona's family moved from Columbus to Macon, Georgia, by the start of her secondary school career. There she attended Ballard Normal High School, a private college preparatory school for African-American students. Cargile graduated as salutatorian from Ballard Normal in 1910.

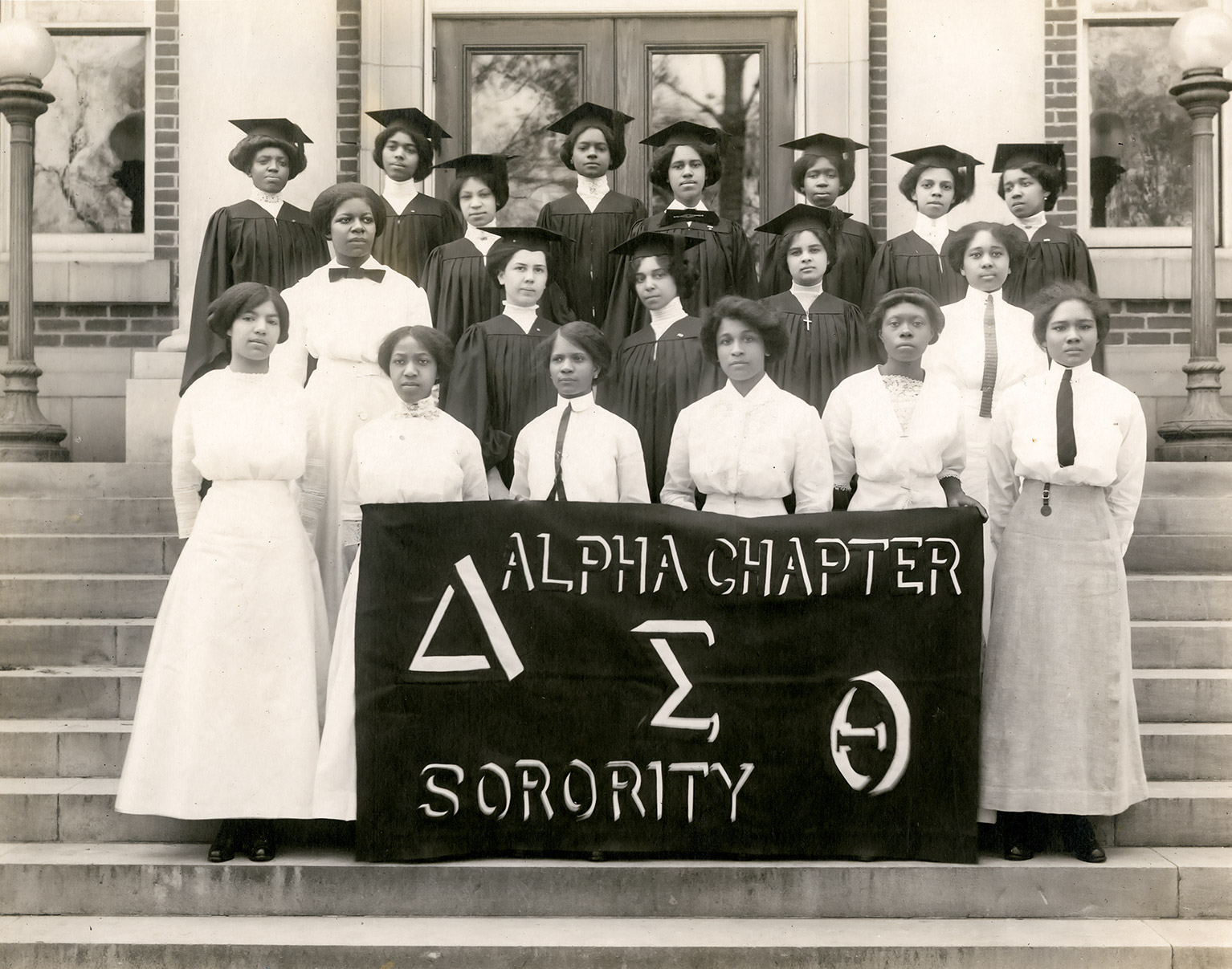
Delta Sigma Theta founders, 1913, at Howard University. Winona Cargile Alexander in the front row, far left.

That fall, Cargile started at Howard University in Washington, D.C., which was both her uncle and her father's alma mater.

During her time there, Cargile became Vice President of her Class, joined clubs such as Social Science Club, Alpha Phi Literary Society, German Club, Classical Club, Yearbook Staff, and the YWCA Cabinet. Winona co-founded the Delta Sigma Theta Sorority during her penultimate year at Howard University. Cargile graduated cum laude with a Bachelor of Arts degree in English in 1914. Cargile was one of 22 founders of Delta Sigma Theta sorority in 1913.

== Career ==
After graduation, Cargile was hired as a high school English teacher in Sedalia, Missouri. She received a graduate fellowship to the New York School of Philanthropy. In 1915, she was the first black person admitted to the graduate studies program, and earned a degree in social work in 1916. After graduation, Cargile was the first black social worker hired for New York City and New York County Charities.

Cargile moved to Jacksonville, Florida, when hired as a social worker the Duval County Welfare Board. In 1917 she married attorney Edward L. Alexander. They moved to Switzerland, Florida, where Edward had a law practice. Cargile had two sons, Edward L. Jr. and James S. (4 daughters died during birth.)

== Later life and death ==
After her husband's death in 1943, Alexander moved her family back to Jacksonville. She worked in social work, first as an administrator with Travelers' Aid. She worked from 1950 until 1960 as admissions officer at Brewster Hospital. Alexander founded the Jacksonville alumnae chapter of Delta Sigma Theta.

She was active in the Laura Street Presbyterian Church, where she taught and was chosen as an elder. She volunteered with the YWCA, where she was on the board of directors, and also on the Methodist Hospital Board of Directors. She died in 1984 in Jacksonville, aged 91.

== Honors and legacy ==
The Jacksonville chapter of the Delta Sigma Theta has a scholarship named after Alexander which is awarded to high school graduates.

In 2018, Lenny Curry, the mayor of Jacksonville, declared June 9, 2018, as Winona Cargile Alexander Memorial Day in honor of her legacy.
