= LMS Princess Royal Class 6203 Princess Margaret Rose =

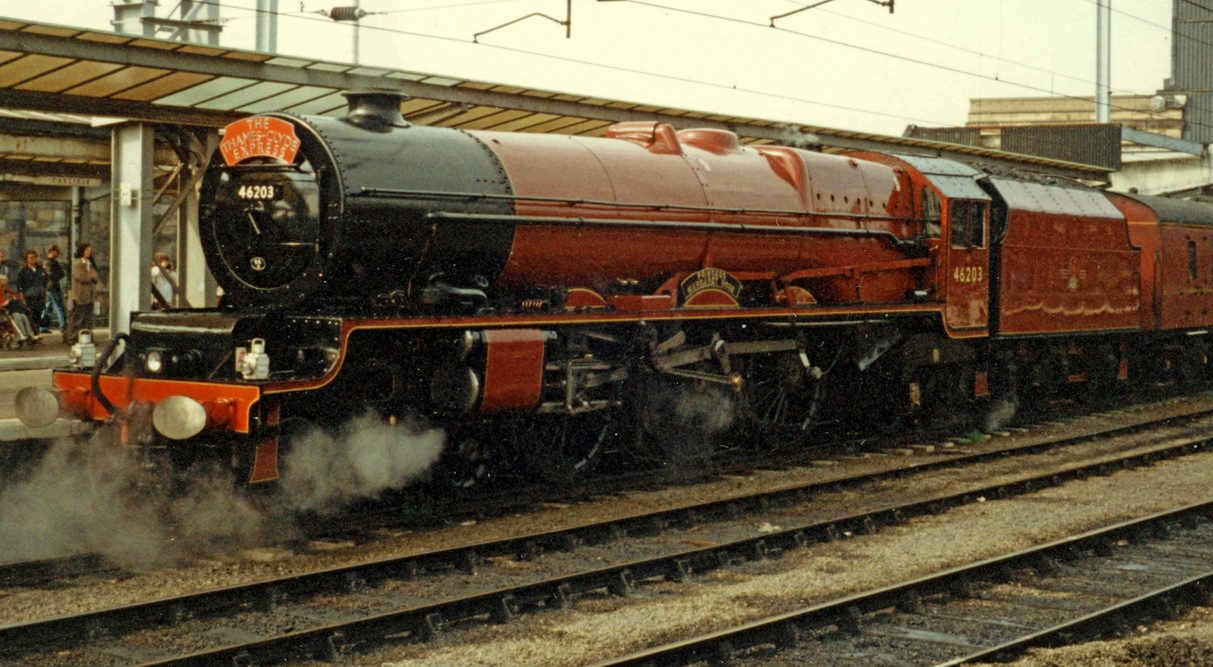
46203 "Princess Margaret Rose" at Carlisle on a special train via Settle and Leeds to Derby in September 1994.

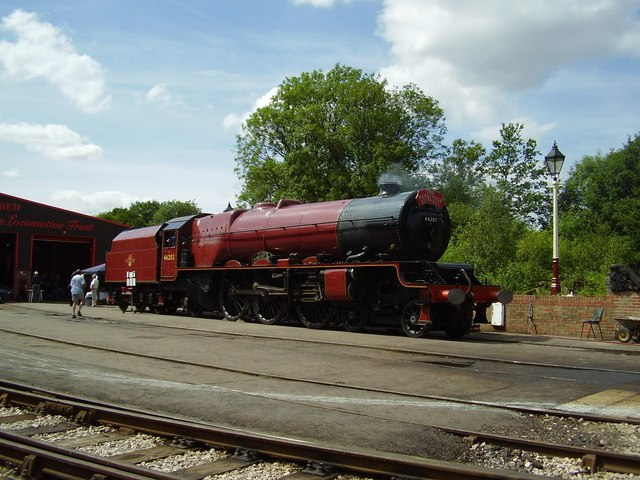
Princess Margaret Rose at Swanwick West Shed in 2006.

London Midland and Scottish Railway (LMS) Princess Royal Class No. 6203 (British Railways No. 46203) Princess Margaret Rose is a preserved British steam locomotive.

== Service ==
6203 was built at Crewe Works, being works number 253 of 1935, and being the third member of the class and first of the second batch. It was named Princess Margaret Rose after the then five-year-old daughter of Prince Albert, Duke of York (later King George VI), Princess Margaret Rose, the younger sister of Queen Elizabeth II.

The locomotive was used to haul the heaviest and fastest LMS passenger trains from London to north and northwest England and to Scotland. During its operational career it was allocated to Crewe North, Edge Hill (Liverpool), Kingmoor (Carlisle) and Polmadie (Glasgow) motive power depots. After nationalisation in 1948, British Railways renumbered it 46203, and it was withdrawn from service in 1962.

== Preservation ==
After withdrawal, 46203 was bought by Billy Butlin of Butlins holiday camps and became one of two preserved Princesses, the other being 46201 Princess Elizabeth. After cosmetic restoration at Crewe, it was moved to Pwllheli in Gwynedd, arriving there in May 1963. It remained there until 1975 when it departed for the Midland Railway Centre (now Midland Railway – Butterley) in Derbyshire.

Butlin sold the engine for £60,000 in 1985 when restoration to working order started, being completed in 1990. It then operated on the UK mainline rail network for several years until 1996, hauling special charter trains.

Since 1975, the locomotive has been based at the Midland Railway – Butterley in Derbyshire. It is owned by The Princess Royal Class Locomotive Trust and is on static display in the West Shed Museum pending a future restoration to working order when funds allow. The PRCLT also owns another Stanier pacific, 6233 Duchess of Sutherland.

In April 2025, it was announced that while still non operational 46203 was to appear on static display at The Greatest Gathering which was taking place from Friday 1 August to Sunday 3 August 2025. The event was to take place at Derby Litchurch Lane Works and was being run as part of the rail 200 celebrations to celebrate 200 years of railways and the opening of the Stockton and Darlington Railway in 1825. During the event 46203 was placed on display inside one of the sheds alongside other locomotives including 6023 'King Edward II' and numerous other locomotives and rolling stock including Midland Railway compound No. 1000.
