= Brewster Hospital =

Geography
- Location: Florida, United States

History
- Opened: 1901

Links
- Lists: Hospitals in Florida
- Brewster Hospital
- U.S. National Register of Historic Places
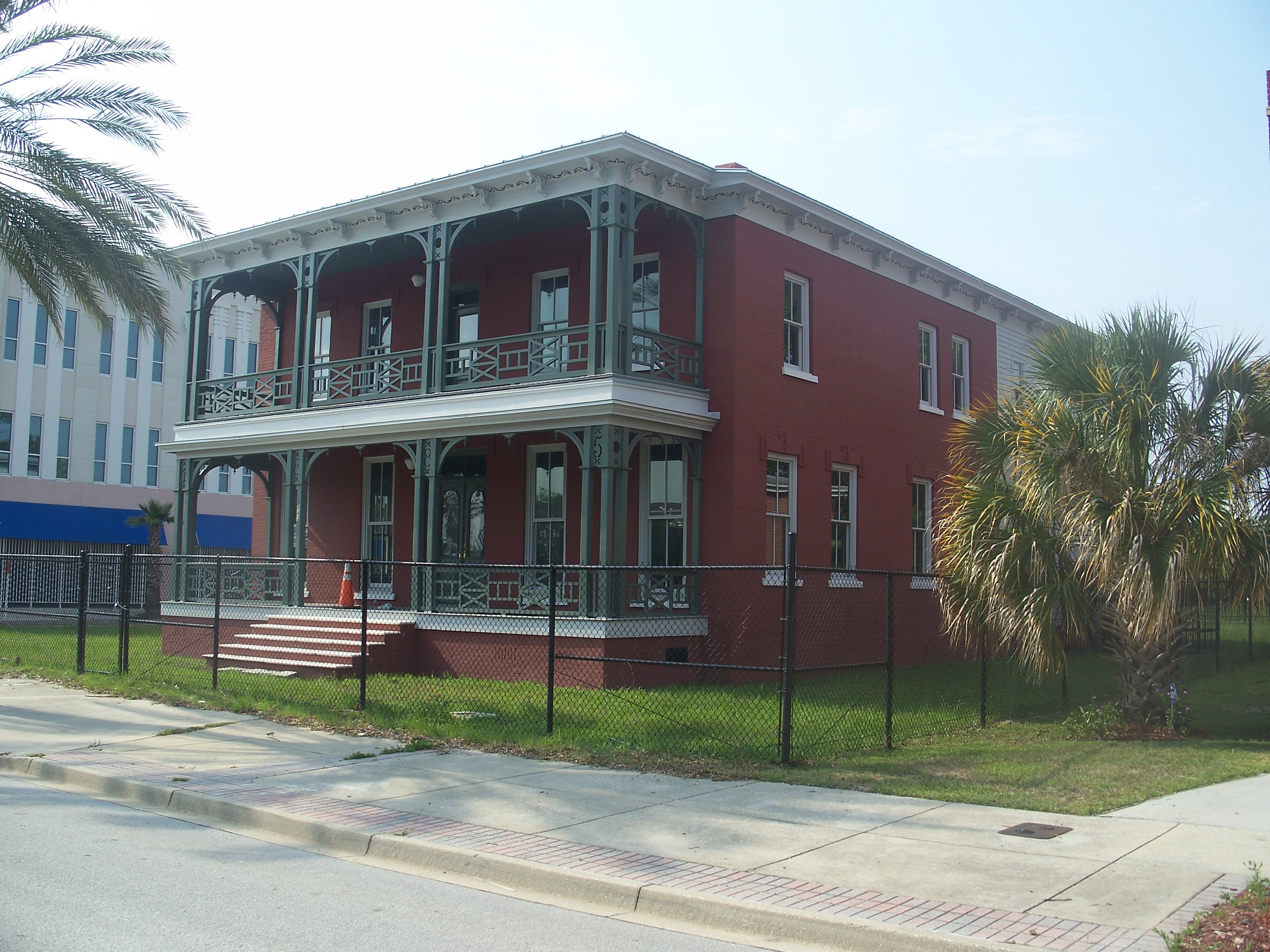

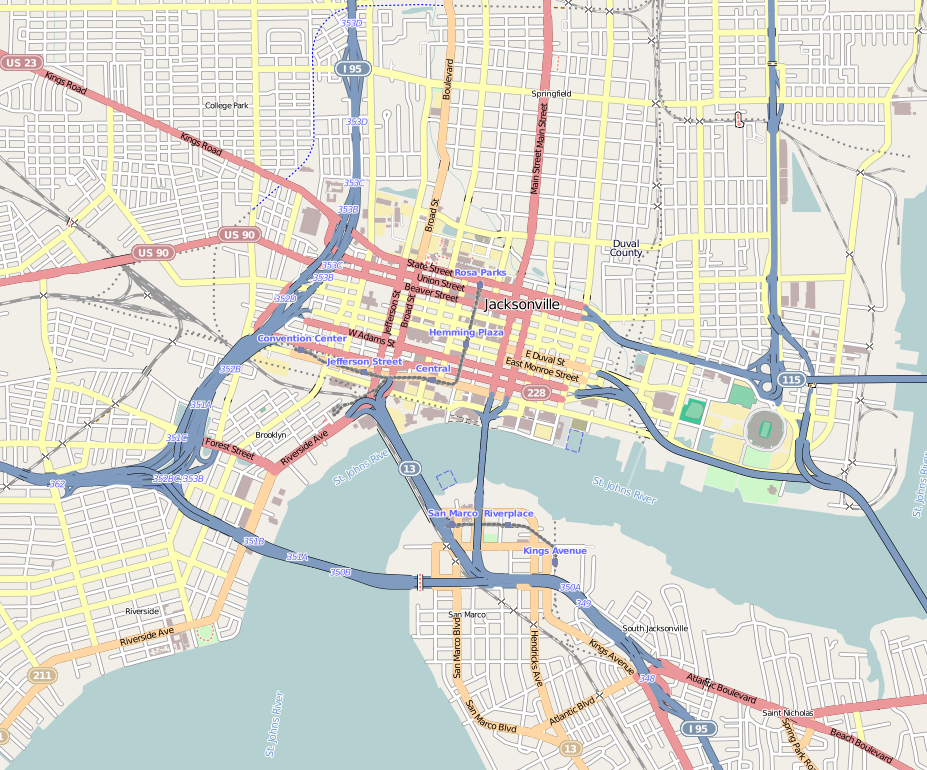
- Location within Central Jacksonville Location within Florida
- Location: Jacksonville, FL
- Coordinates: 30°19′51.86″N 81°40′8.01″W
- Built: 1901
- NRHP reference No.: 76000588
- Added to NRHP: 13 May 1976

The Brewster Hospital building is a historic U.S. hospital in the LaVilla neighborhood of Jacksonville, Florida. It was located at 915 West Monroe Street. On May 13, 1976, the building was added to the U.S. National Register of Historic Places. In 2005, it was moved across the street to 843 West Monroe Street.

== History ==
Brewster Hospital was the first Black hospital in Jacksonville. It served African Americans in Jacksonville from 1901 to 1966. It was founded in 1901 as the George A. Brewster Hospital and School of Nurse Training, because there was no place for Black people to go to for treatment after the disastrous Great Fire of 1901. Its sponsor was the Women's Division of the Methodist Board of Missions. (As in other Southern cities, white hospitals did not treat Black residents before the Civil Rights Act of 1964.) The hospital began at the West Monroe building, later expanding to East Jacksonville and Springfield. Abbie Sweetwine, the military nurse dubbed "The Angel of Platform 6" for her work during the British Harrow and Wealdstone rail crash, under took her initial training as a nurse at Brewster Hospital.

The hospital closed in 1966 because, like Florida A&M Hospital, the forced integration of white hospitals meant it lost its funding. Its Springfield building was gutted and rebuilt as Methodist Hospital, opening in 1967. The building that replaced it became Methodist Medical Center in 1993, and in 1999 merged with University Medical Center to become the Shands Jacksonville Medical Center, an affiliate of the University of Florida and Shands HealthCare.

The original Brewster Hospital building was first constructed in 1885 as a private residence. It was purchased for use as a hospital in 1901 and remained occupied until the hospital's demise in 1966. In the mid-2000s, the city of Jacksonville relocated the building to a parcel of land down the street and spent $1.2 million rehabilitating it for a new use. As of 2020, North Florida Land Trust is its primary tenant.
