= LMS Turbomotive =

1935 locomotive designed by William Stanier

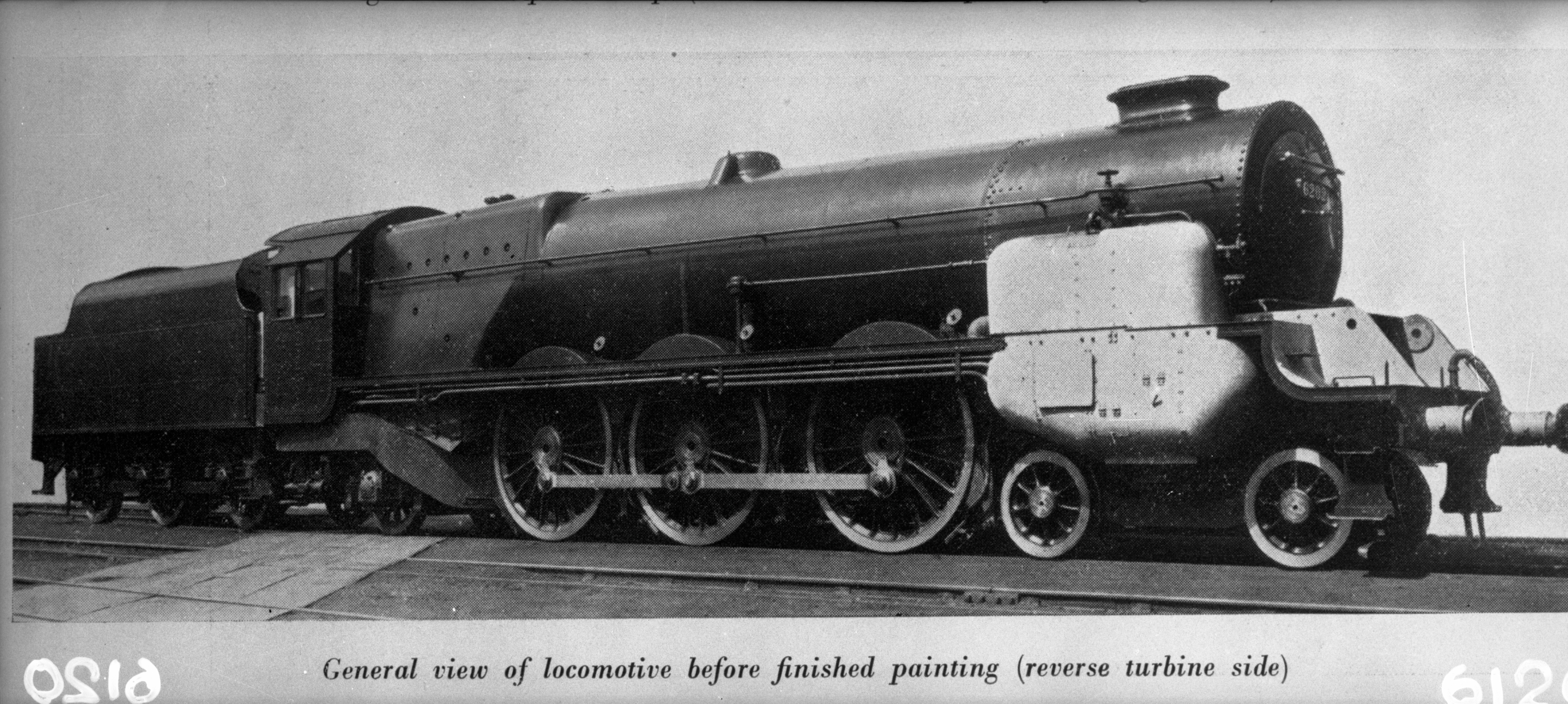
- The LMS Turbomotive in original form
Type and origin
- Power type: Steam Turbine-mechanical
- Designer: William Stanier
- Builder: LMS Crewe Works
- Build date: 1935
Specifications
- Configuration
  - Whyte: 4-6-2 Pacific
  - UIC: 2′C1′ turb.h
- Gauge: 4 ft 8 1/2 in (1,435 mm)
- Leading dia.: 3 ft 0 in (0.914 m)
- Driver dia.: 6 ft 6 in (1.981 m)
- Trailing dia.: 3 ft 9 in (1.143 m)
- Length: 74 ft 4 1/4 in (22.66 m) (orig.); 74 ft 0 1/4 in (22.56 m) (rebuilt)
- Loco weight: 110.55 long tons (123.82 short tons; 112.32 t) (orig.); 105.20 long tons (117.82 short tons; 106.89 t) (rebuilt)
- Fuel type: Coal
- Fuel capacity: 9 long tons (10 short tons; 9.1 t)
- Water cap.: 4,000 imp gal (18,000 L; 4,800 US gal)
- Firebox
  - Grate area: 45 sq ft (4.2 m^{2})
- Boiler: LMS type 1
- Boiler pressure: 250 lbf/in^{2} (1.7 MPa)
- Heating surface
  - Firebox: 217 sq ft (20.2 m^{2})
- Cylinders: Rebuilt: 4
- Cylinder size: Rebuilt: 16 1/2 in × 28 in (419 mm × 711 mm)
- Valve gear: Rebuilt: Walschaerts for outside cylinders with rocking shafts for inside cylinders
Performance figures
- Tractive effort: Rebuilt: 41,536 lbf (184.76 kN)
Career
- Operators: London, Midland & Scottish; British Railways
- Power class: LMS: 7P; BR: 8P
- Numbers: LMS: 6202; BR: 46202
- Disposition: Rebuilt as conventional reciprocating-steam locomotive in 1952, wrecked same year, scrapped.

The LMS Turbomotive was a modified LMS Princess Royal Class steam turbine locomotive designed by William Stanier and built by the London, Midland and Scottish Railway in 1935. It was inspired by the Swedish Ljungström locomotives first introduced in 1922. It used steam turbines instead of cylinders. It was later rebuilt as a conventional locomotive No. 46202 Princess Anne.

== Design ==
The locomotive chassis was constructed as the third prototype of the LMS Princess Royal Class, utilising the class frame design, and numbered 6202.

The forward turbine had 18 rows of blading. Power output was 2,400 hp (1,800 kW) at 7,060 rpm, corresponding to running at 62 mph (100 km/h). Boiler pressure was 250 psi (1.7 MPa). The turbine was designed to operate into a maximum back-pressure of 2 psi (14 kPa), allowing a conventional double blast-pipe to provide the boiler draught and eliminating draught fans, which tended to give a disproportionate amount of trouble.

The reverse turbine had four rows of blades. It was engaged by a dog clutch, activated when the reverser lever was set to "0". This was originally steam-operated by a small piston and cylinder.

Compared to some other experimental steam locomotives of the era, such as the LNER's W1, Turbomotive was relatively successful, showing a saving of coal compared to a normal reciprocating engine and no hammer blow on the track. Because steam turbines are highly inefficient when throttled (not a problem on steamships, where turbines typically run at constant output, but a major disadvantage for a railway locomotive which has to run at different speeds), power was instead controlled by turning on a different number of nozzles (from the six available) through which steam was admitted to the turbine. One disadvantage of the design was that the small reverse turbine only had sufficient power for manoeuvring "light engine" and the locomotive always had to be turned to face forwards in order to pull a train.

When a turbine failure occurred in 1949, it was considered uneconomic to repair, due to post-war austerity measures, so the locomotive was taken out of service pending a rebuild.

== 46202 Princess Anne ==
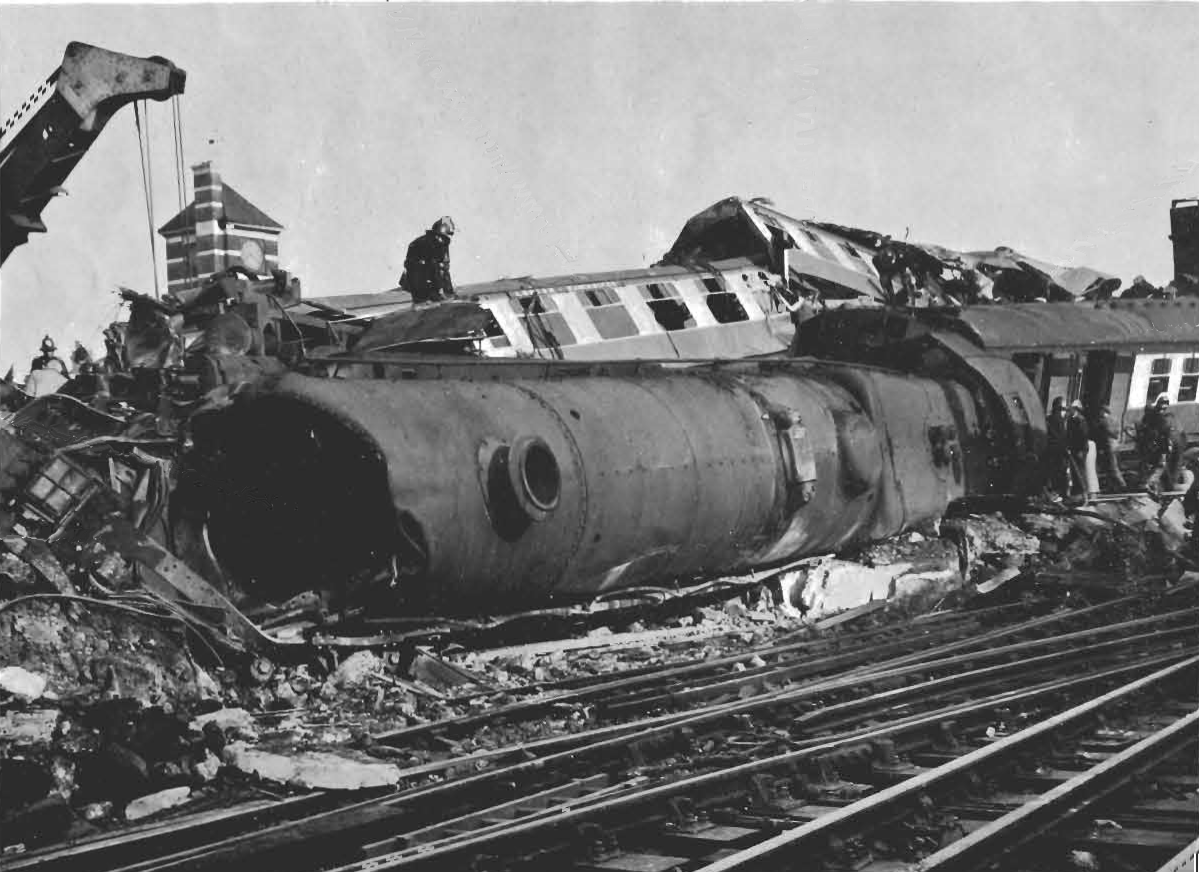
46202 Princess Anne destroyed in the 1952 Harrow and Wealdstone rail crash

46202 was later rebuilt as a conventional locomotive in 1952, using new mainframes and a set of cylinders of the same type as used in the "Coronation" Class, and named Princess Anne.

On 8 October 1952, after only two months in service, while hauling an express train bound for Liverpool Lime Street, it was involved in the Harrow and Wealdstone rail crash. The steam locomotive was taken to Crewe, where it was deemed beyond economical repair and scrapped.

The destruction of No. 46202 led to the construction of BR Standard Class 8 number 71000, Duke of Gloucester.
