= Abbie Sweetwine =

American nurse, founder of modern paramedic medicine

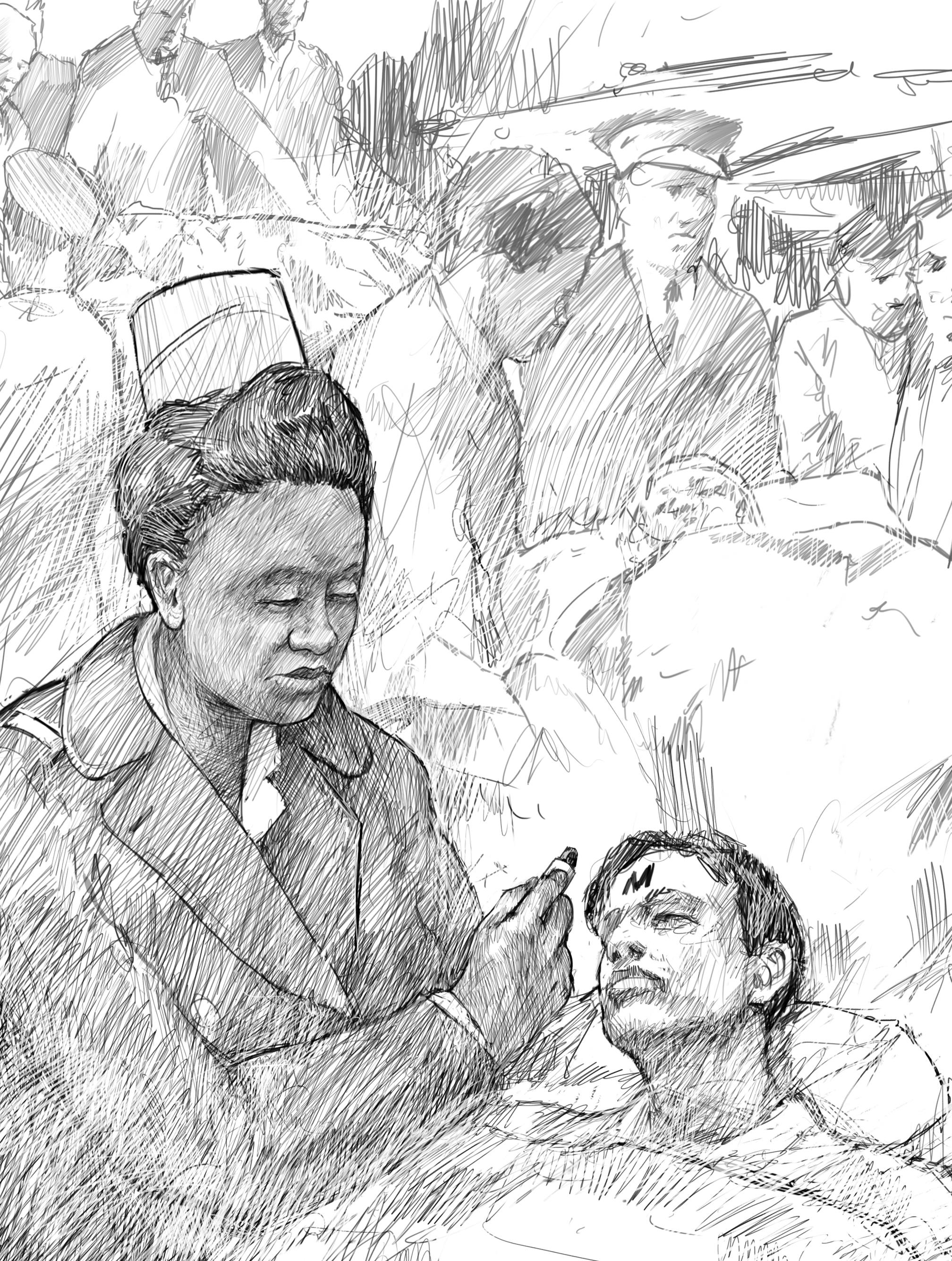
- Drawing of Abbie Sweetwine treating injured during the 1952 Harrow and Wealdstone rail crash
- Born: May 28, 1921; Cocoa, Florida, U.S.
- Died: May 7, 2009 (aged 87)
- Burial place: Arlington National Cemetery
- Employer: United States Air Force

Abbie Sweetwine (May 28, 1921 – May 7, 2009) was an American nurse remembered for her work during the Harrow and Wealdstone rail crash. In a headline at the time, the Daily Mirror described her as "The Angel of Platform 6".

== Early life and education ==
Abbie L. Sweetwine was born and raised in Cocoa, Florida. She had two sisters, Willie Ruth Austell and Dorothy H Sweetwine, the latter of whom became a local newspaper editor.

She graduated in nursing from Brewster Hospital, the first Black hospital in Jacksonville, in 1942 and received her R.N. a few months later.

== Career ==
She began her service life in the army. By July 1946, she had served in Provident Hospital at Fort Lauderdale, at the Whitaker Memorial Hospital in Newport News, Virginia, and with the U.S. Migratory set-up at Belle Glade, Florida and in North Charleston, South Carolina.

Sweetwine is best known for her involvement with the Harrow & Wealdstone rail crash. During the morning rush hour on October 8, 1952, a three-train collision at Harrow & Wealdstone station near London, England, resulted in hundreds of casualties. Members of the 494th Medical Group of the United States Air Force were on board one of the trains, and called their new hospital station in South Ruislip. The Air Force Hospital sent out an emergency response team, all trained in battlefield medicine, commanded by Lieutenant Colonel Weideman of the USAF which included seven doctors and one nurse, Sweetwine.

2nd Lt. Nurse Sweetwine and her colleagues established a triage station on the side platforms of Harrow & Wealdstone station. Along with the doctors who had responded to the emergency call, she started to sort and treat the wounded before they were taken to hospital. To those who were lightly wounded or in emotional shock, Nurse Sweetwine handed out cigarettes and tea. To casualties she provided blood plasma and morphine.

Using her own lipstick, Sweetwine marked the people who had been treated with an 'X' and those treated with morphine an 'M'. She relayed this information to the ambulance crews, who informed the hospitals about the status of each patient. Sweetwine's efforts ensured that patients did not receive an overdose of morphine.

The Daily Mirror dubbed Sweetwine "the Angel of Platform Six".

In January 1953, she was invited to a celebratory luncheon of the Royal Variety Charity at the Savoy Hotel. They presented her with a cigarette case with her name engraved upon it. The work of Sweetwine and the USAF team is credited with inspiring the development of the use of paramedics in Britain.

By the time of her retirement in 1969, she was a major in the United States Air Force. She returned to live in Cocoa, Florida and then moved to Rockledge where she lived with her sisters for over thirty years.

She died at the age of 87 and was laid to rest at the Arlington National Cemetery.
