= LMS Princess Coronation Class 6233 Duchess of Sutherland =

Preserved British 4-6-2 locomotive

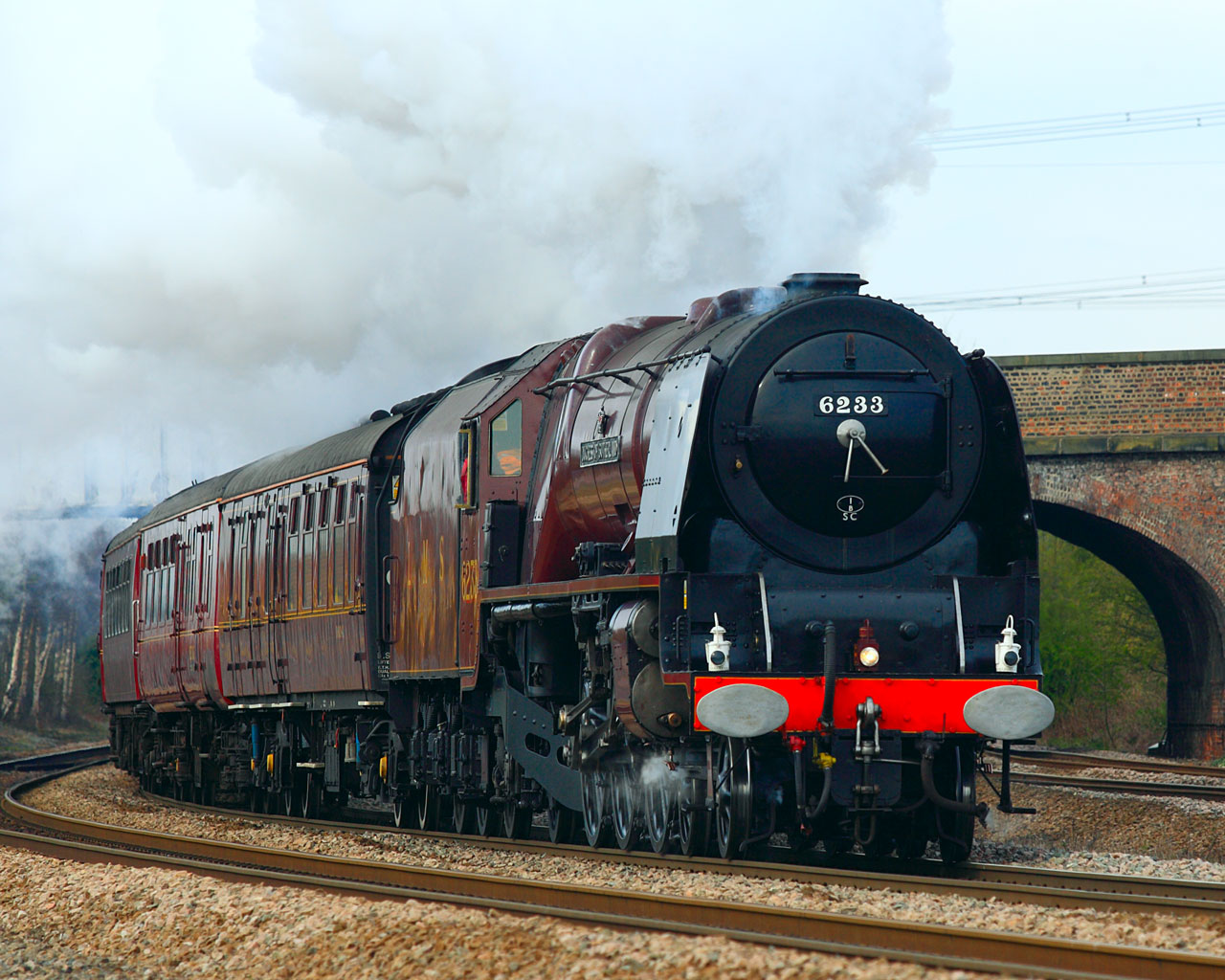
- 6233 Duchess of Sutherland at Monk Fryston
Type and origin
- Power type: Steam
- Designer: William Stanier
- Builder: LMS Crewe Works
- Build date: 1938
Specifications
- Configuration
  - Whyte: 4-6-2
  - UIC: 2'C1'h
- Gauge: 4 ft 8 1/2 in (1,435 mm) standard gauge
- Leading dia.: 36 in (910 mm)
- Driver dia.: 81 in (2,060 mm)
- Trailing dia.: 45 in (1,140 mm)
- Length: 73 ft 10 1/4 in (22.51 m) (conventional), 73 ft 9 3/4 in (22.50 m) (streamlined)
- Loco weight: 105.25 long tons (106.94 t; 117.88 short tons) (conventional), 108.1 long tons (109.8 t; 121.1 short tons) (streamlined)
- Tender weight: 56.35 long tons (57.25 t; 63.11 short tons)
- Fuel type: Coal
- Fuel capacity: 10 long tons (10.2 t; 11.2 short tons)
- Water cap.: 5,000 imp gal (23,000 L; 6,000 US gal), formerly 4,000 imp gal (18,000 L; 4,800 US gal)
- Firebox
  - Grate area: 50 sq ft (4.6 m^{2})
- Boiler: LMS type 1X
- Boiler pressure: 250 psi (1.7 MPa) superheated
- Heating surface
  - Firebox: 230 sq ft (21 m^{2})
  - Tubes: 2,577 sq ft (239.4 m^{2})
- Superheater
  - Heating area: 822–856 sq ft (76.4–79.5 m^{2})
- Cylinders: 4
- Cylinder size: 16 1/2 in × 28 in (419 mm × 711 mm)
- Valve gear: Walschaerts for outside cylinders with rocking shafts for inside cylinders,
- Valve type: piston valves
Performance figures
- Tractive effort: 40,000 lbf (180 kN)
Career
- Class: LMS Coronation Class
- Power class: 7P, later 8P
- Retired: 1964
- Disposition: Undergoing running gear overhaul, mainline certified

LMS Princess Coronation Class 46233 Duchess of Sutherland is a steam locomotive built in 1938 for the London, Midland and Scottish Railway (LMS) at Crewe Works to a design by William Stanier. It is a 4-6-2 Pacific locomotive built as part of the LMS Coronation Class for its express passenger services, including the Royal Scot service from London to Glasgow.

Withdrawn by British Railways in 1964, the locomotive was originally sold to Butlins holiday camp in Scotland. In 1996, the locomotive was acquired by The Princess Royal Class Locomotive Trust with the intention of restoration to mainline condition. In 2001, 46233 was restored to operating condition and since then has been a regular performer on the national network.

== Service ==
6233 was outshopped in July 1938 from Crewe Works and was part of the third batch of her class. These were unstreamlined, painted in LMS standard crimson lake livery and had a single chimney and no smoke deflectors and an estimated cost of £13,800 each (equivalent to £803,097 in 2025).

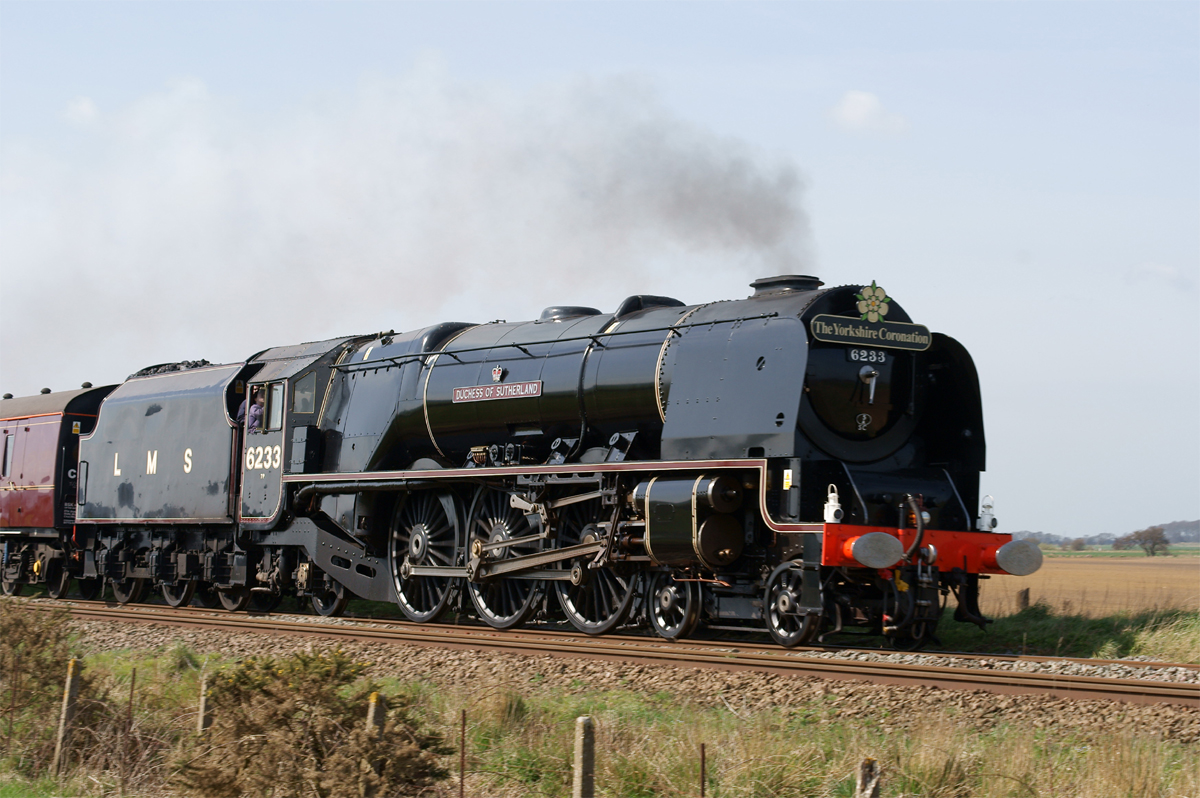
6233 Duchess of Sutherland running in 2010 with LMS lined black livery.

6233 was initially allocated to Camden, London. It acquired a double chimney in March 1941 and because of drifting smoke acquired smoke deflectors in September 1945 before being painted in postwar LMS black livery in September 1946. With the creation of British Railways (BR) on 1 January 1948 it was allocated to Crewe North depot. BR renumbered the locomotive to 46233 in October 1948 and repainted it in BR green livery in 1952 or early 1953. In June 1958 it was allocated to Carlisle Upperby before eventually being withdrawn from Edge Hill depot in February 1964. During its 25 years service Duchess of Sutherland ran 1,650,000 miles (2,660,000 km) - the second highest mileage by any member of the class.

== Preservation ==
Following withdrawal from service, 46233 was acquired by Butlins Heads-of-Ayr holiday camp, Scotland, in October 1964. It was later purchased by Bressingham Steam Museum. In 1996, 6233 was acquired by the Princess Royal Class Locomotive Trust (PRCLT) arriving at the PRCLT's West Shed, at Swanwick Junction on the Midland Railway - Butterley, on 3 February 1996. In 2001, No. 6233 returned to the national network after an overhaul assisted by the heritage lottery fund and match funded by the PRCLT.

To allow it to run on the main line in preservation, 6233 was fitted with Train Protection & Warning System (TPWS) and on-train monitoring recorder (OTMR) equipment, alongside the BR fitted Automatic Warning System (AWS).

On 6 March 2010, 6233 was rolled out in LMS lined black livery, which was retained during 2010, before a major overhaul, taking 6233 out of service for the 2011 season.

On 3 March 2012, now renumbered 46233 was rolled out in "authentic green" livery, as used by British Railways during the early 1950s, at the Midland Railway - Butterley following a major overhaul.

On 9 September 2018, the engine regained its original number "6233" and LMS "Crimson Lake" livery to mark its 80th birthday.

== Royal Train ==
On 11 June 2002, the restored Duchess was the first steam locomotive to haul the Royal Train for 35 years, transporting Queen Elizabeth II on a tour to North Wales, from Holyhead to Llandudno Junction, as part of her Golden Jubilee. The trip also marked the 160th anniversary of the first Royal train in 1842.

On 22 March 2005, the Duchess again hauled the Royal Train, the second time for a steam locomotive in 40 years, transporting The Prince of Wales from Settle to Carlisle over the Settle-Carlisle Railway. The trip marked the 25th anniversary of the formation of the 'Friends of the Settle & Carlisle Line' pressure group. On the trip, the Prince spent a 15-minute spell at the controls of 6233.
