= No. 6207; A Study in Steel =

- Produced by: Topical Press Agency; Commercial and Educational Films
- Narrated by: John Watt
- Release date: 1935
- Running time: 17 minutes
- Country: England
- Language: English

No. 6207; A Study in Steel is a 1935 British documentary film about the construction of a steam locomotive, the London Midland and Scottish Railway Princess Royal Class No. 6207 Princess Arthur of Connaught. The short film, which was co-produced by Topical Press Agency and Commercial and Educational Films, was filmed at the LMS's Crewe Works. It was narrated by John Watt.

== Documentary ==
The LMS Princess Royal Class was designed by William Stanier, head designer for the London Midland and Scottish railway company and built between 1932 and 1935. The 17-minute B&W film shows various stages of locomotive production at Crewe works, from casting through to assembly. Prior to the locomotive being assembled in the Crewe plant, there are scenes from its earliest stage. These are of various parts of the locomotive being cut, cast and forged from raw metal. The machinery used is all manned by people. The film shows the materials, tools, process, and what is involved to make a complete working steam locomotive.
