= LMS Princess Royal Class =

Class of 12+1 British 4-6-2 locomotives

Princess Royal Class
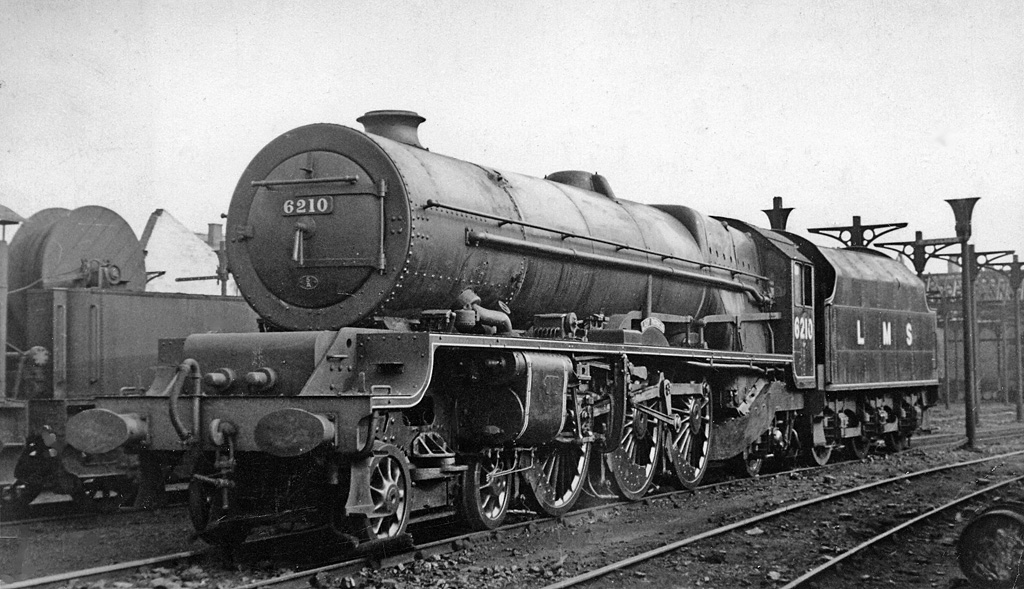
- 6210 Lady Patricia at Crewe Works in 1948
Type and origin
- Power type: Steam
- Designer: William Stanier
- Builder: LMS Crewe Works
- Build date: 1933 (2), 1935 (10)
- Total produced: 12
Specifications
- Configuration
  - Whyte: 4-6-2
  - UIC: 2′C1′ h4s
- Gauge: 4 ft 8 1/2 in (1,435 mm)
- Leading dia.: 3 ft 0 in (0.914 m)
- Driver dia.: 6 ft 6 in (1.981 m)
- Trailing dia.: 3 ft 9 in (1.143 m)
- Minimum curve: 6 chains (121 m) normal; 4 1/2 chains (91 m) dead slow
- Wheelbase: 63 ft 10 in (19.456 m)
  - Engine: 37 ft 9 in (11.506 m)
  - Drivers: 15 ft 3 in (4.648 m)
  - Tender: 15 ft 0 in (4.572 m)
- Length: 74 ft 4 1/4 in (22.663 m)
- Width: 9 ft 0 in (2.743 m)
- Height: 13 ft 3 in (4.039 m)
- Axle load: 22.5 long tons (22.9 t; 25.2 short tons)
  - Leading: 21 long tons (21.3 t; 23.5 short tons)
  - Coupled: 22 long tons (22.4 t; 24.6 short tons)
  - Trailing: 16 long tons (16.3 t; 17.9 short tons)
  - Tender axle: Front: 18.6 long tons (18.9 t; 20.8 short tons); Middle: 17.8 long tons (18.1 t; 19.9 short tons); Rear: 18.25 long tons (18.54 t; 20.44 short tons)
- Adhesive weight: 67.5 long tons (68.6 t; 75.6 short tons)
- Loco weight: 104.5 long tons (106.2 t; 117.0 short tons); 46202: 110.55 long tons (112.32 t; 123.82 short tons)
- Tender weight: 54.65 long tons (55.53 t; 61.21 short tons)
- Fuel type: Coal
- Fuel capacity: 9 long tons (9.1 t; 10.1 short tons); later 10 long tons (10.2 t; 11.2 short tons)
- Water cap.: 4,000 imp gal (18,000 L; 4,800 US gal)
- Firebox
  - Type
  - Grate area: 45 sq ft (4.2 m^{2})
- Boiler
  - Model: LMS type 1
  - Tube plates: 19 ft 3 in (5.867 m)
  - Small tubes: 2 3/8 in (60 mm), 32 off
  - Large tubes: 5 1/8 in (130 mm), 123 off
- Boiler pressure: 250 psi (1.7 MPa)
- Heating surface
  - Firebox: 190 or 217 sq ft (17.7 or 20.2 m^{2})
  - Tubes and flues: 2,299 sq ft (213.6 m^{2})
  - Total surface
- Superheater
  - Heating area: 584 sq ft (54.3 m^{2})
- Cylinders: 4
- Cylinder size: Production Models: 16 1/4 in × 28 in (413 mm × 711 mm)
- Valve gear: Walschaerts; 6205 had outside Walschaerts with rocking shafts operating inside valves.
- Valve type: Piston valves
Performance figures
- Tractive effort: 40,286 lbf (179.20 kN) (production engines)
Career
- Operators: London, Midland and Scottish Railway; British Railways
- Power class: 7P reclassified 8P in 1951
- Numbers: (4)6200/1/3–12
- Nicknames: Lizzies
- Locale: London Midland Region
- Withdrawn: 1961 (6), 1962 (6)
- Preserved: 6201, 6203
- Disposition: Two preserved, remainder scrapped

The London, Midland and Scottish Railway (LMS) Princess Royal Class is a class of express passenger 4-6-2 steam locomotive designed by William Stanier. Twelve examples were built at Crewe Works, between 1933 and 1935, for use on the West Coast Main Line. Two are preserved.

== Overview ==
The designer of the class, William Stanier, had previously been Works Manager of the Great Western Railway's depot at Swindon Works, and had been recruited with a brief to replace the LMS's miscellany of locomotives inherited from its constituent companies. He made extensive use of Great Western features in his designs.

To match the power and speed and especially the prestige of the London and North Eastern Railway's express Pacific locomotives, Stanier designed the Princess Royal class almost as soon as he was appointed to the LMS. When originally built, they were used to haul the famous Royal Scot train between London Euston and Glasgow Central.

== Design ==
The class was based on GWR 111 The Great Bear, a design produced in 1907 for the Great Western by George Jackson Churchward. The smokebox and cylinders were closely based on those of the GWR 6000 Class (also known as the King Class). The inside cylinders were abreast the leading bogied wheels and drove cranks on the leading coupled axle, the outside cylinders were abreast the rear bogie wheels (which made substantial cross-bracing necessary between the cylinders and the locomotive frame) and drove crank pins on the centre coupled axle. Each of the four cylinders had its own set of Walschaerts valve gear.Other minor details, such as corks to close oil boxes, closely followed Great Western practice.

== Construction ==
A prototype batch of three locomotives was to be constructed in 1933. Two were constructed as drawn but the third set of frames was retained as the basis for an experimental turbine locomotive.

=== Turbomotive ===
The third prototype was constructed with the aid of the Swedish Ljungstrom turbine company and known as the Turbomotive, although not named. It was numbered 6202, in sequence with the Princess Royals. Although 'generally similar' to the rest of the Princess Royals, and 'not all that much different', it used a larger 40 element superheater to give a higher steam temperature, more suitable for turbine use. (Note: This trifurcated superheater design was later used on the Duchess class.) This boiler was also domeless as would later be used for the second batch of the Princess Royals. The continuous exhaust of the turbine, rather than the sharper intermittent blast of the piston engine, also required changes to the draughting and the use of a double chimney. It entered service in June 1935 on the London–Liverpool service.

This Turbomotive was rebuilt in 1952 with conventional 'Coronation' cylinders and named Princess Anne, but was soon destroyed in the Harrow and Wealdstone rail crash.

=== Later production ===
A second batch of eleven locomotives was constructed later. The first two locomotives of the class to be produced had a firebox combustion volume too small for the grate area, and the subsequent locomotives had enlarged fireboxes.

== Accidents and incidents ==
- On 17 April 1948, a passenger train hauled by locomotive No. 6207 Princess Arthur of Connaught was halted after a passenger pulled the communication cord. It was then hit from behind by a postal train, which a signalman's error had allowed into the section, resulting in the deaths of 24 passengers.
- On 21 September 1951, locomotive No. 46207 Princess Arthur of Connaught was hauling an express passenger train that was derailed at Weedon, Northamptonshire due to a defective front bogie on the locomotive. Fifteen people were killed and 35 were injured.
- On 8 October 1952, locomotive No. 46202 Princess Anne was one of the locomotives on the 8:00 a.m express from Euston to Liverpool and Manchester, along with LMS Jubilee Class No. 45637 Windward Islands. Princess Anne took serious damage in the crash, having the leading bogie torn off and main frames buckled, and was scrapped after being deemed uneconomic to repair it.

== Naming ==
Each locomotive was named after a princess, the official name for the class was chosen because Mary, Princess Royal was the Colonel-in-Chief of the Royal Scots. However, the locomotives were known to railwaymen as "Lizzies", after the second example of the class, named for Princess Elizabeth, who later became Queen Elizabeth II. Later examples of 4-6-2 express passenger locomotive built by the LMS were of the related but larger, Coronation Class.

== Withdrawal ==
The class was withdrawn in the early 1960s in line with British Railways' modernisation plan.

== Details ==
LMS No.	BR No.	Name(s)	Date Built	Date Withdrawn	Photograph	Notes
6200	46200	The Princess Royal	27 July 1933	17 November 1962		Last to be withdrawn.
6201	46201	Princess Elizabeth	3 November 1933	20 October 1962		Preserved.
6203	46203	Princess Margaret Rose	1 July 1935	20 October 1962		Preserved. Owned by the Princess Royal Class Locomotive Trust.
6204	46204	Princess Louise	19 July 1935	7 October 1961		
6205	46205	Princess Victoria	24 July 1935	25 November 1961		Fitted with modified valve gear in 1947. Converted back to normal in 1955.
6206	46206	Princess Marie Louise	1 August 1935	20 October 1962		
6207	46207	Princess Arthur of Connaught	9 August 1935	25 November 1961		Appeared in the 1930s classic documentary film No. 6207; A Study in Steel which showed the production of the locomotive from molten steel to the finished product. Involved in the 1948 Winsford railway accident and 1951 Weedon Rail Crash.
6208	46208	Princess Helena Victoria	16 August 1935	20 October 1962		
6209	46209	Princess Beatrice	23 August 1935	29 September 1962		
6210	46210	Lady Patricia	6 September 1935	7 October 1961		
6211	46211	Queen Maud	18 September 1935	7 October 1961		
6212	46212	Duchess of Kent	21 October 1935	7 October 1961		

== Preservation ==
Two examples, 6201 Princess Elizabeth and 6203 Princess Margaret Rose are preserved and both have operated on the mainline in preservation. They were named after the two children of Prince Albert, Duke of York (later King George VI), and his wife, Elizabeth, Duchess of York (later Queen Elizabeth, and after the king's death, Queen Elizabeth the Queen Mother). Princess Elizabeth Alexandra Mary (later Queen Elizabeth II) was seven years old in 1933 when her namesake was built, and Princess Margaret Rose was nearly five in July 1935 when her namesake was completed. At the time, they were third and fourth in line to the throne. 'Princess Margaret Rose' is owned by The Princess Royal Class Locomotive Trust and is on static display at the West Shed Museum, Midland Railway-Butterley, Ripley, Derbyshire.

Note: Loco numbers in bold mean their current number.

Number		Name	Built	Withdrawn	Service Life	Livery	Location	Owners	Status	Mainline Certified	Photograph	Notes
LMS	BR	Name	Built	Withdrawn	Service Life	Livery	Location	Owners	Status	Mainline Certified	Photograph	Notes
**6201**	46201	Princess Elizabeth	Nov 1933	Oct 1962	28 Years, 11 Months	LMS Crimson Lake (on completion)	Carnforth MPD	6201 Princess Elizabeth Society	Under Overhaul	No, to be certified		Withdrawn July/August 2021 due to cracked firebox. Mainline Standard overhaul commenced in September 2023.
6203	**46203**	Princess Margaret Rose	Jul 1935	Oct 1962	27 Years, 3 Months	BR Crimson Lake, Late Crest	Butterley	Princess Royal Class Locomotive Trust	Static Display	No		Last ran in 1996.

== Gallery ==
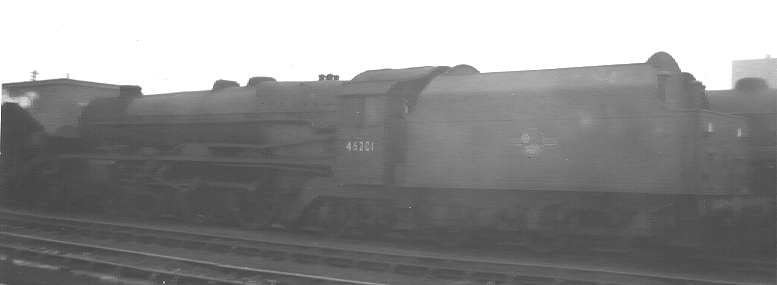
46201 Princess Elizabeth at Carlisle awaiting scrapping. The locomotive was later preserved.

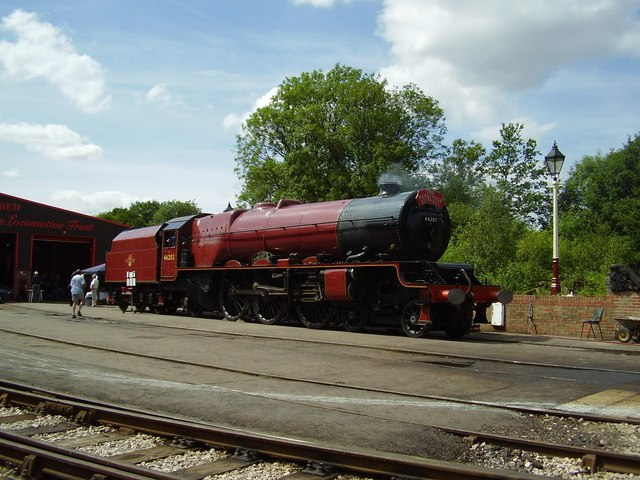
Princess Margaret Rose at Swanwick West Shed in 2006.

== Media ==
- 6201 at Langho on Whalley Bank – sound recording.
