= Harrow and Wealdstone rail crash =

1952 train crash in Wealdstone, England

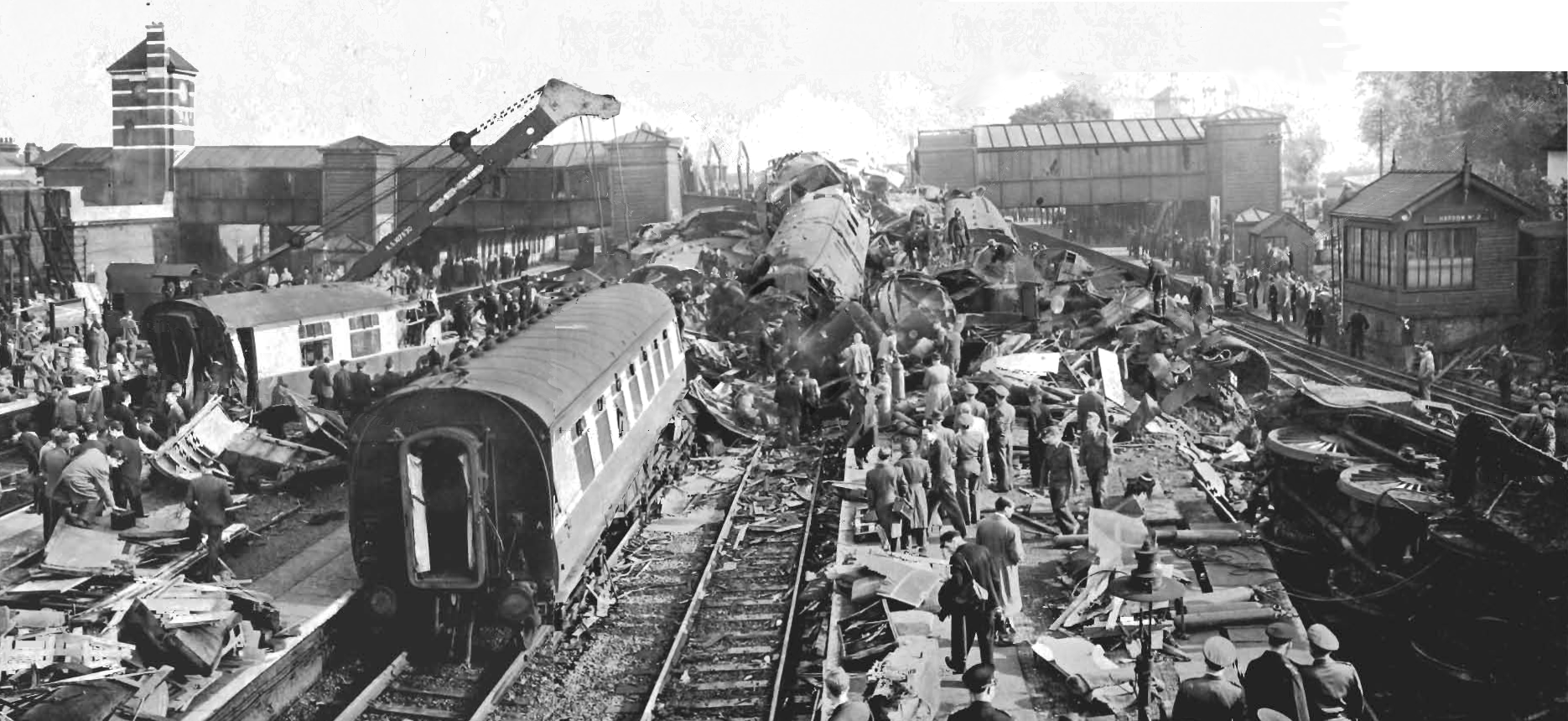
- View of the platforms from the north after the crash

Details
- Date: 8 October 1952; 74 years ago 8:19 a.m.
- Location: Harrow and Wealdstone
- Coordinates: 51°35′32″N 0°20′06″W
- Country: England
- Line: West Coast Main Line
- Operator: British Railways – London Midland Region
- Cause: Human error (Signal passed at danger)

Statistics
- Trains: 3
- Deaths: 112
- Injured: 340

Three trains collided at Harrow and Wealdstone station in Wealdstone, Middlesex (now Greater London), England during the morning rush hour of 8 October 1952. The crash resulted in 112 deaths and 340 injuries, 88 of these being detained in hospital. It remains the worst peacetime rail crash in British history and the second deadliest overall after the Quintinshill rail disaster of 1915.

An overnight express train from Perth crashed into the rear of a local passenger train standing at a platform at the station. The wreckage blocked adjacent lines and was struck within seconds by a double-headed express train travelling north at 60 mph (100 km/h). The Ministry of Transport report on the crash concluded that the driver of the Perth train had passed a caution signal and two danger signals before colliding with the local train. The reason for this was never established, as both the driver and the fireman of the Perth train were killed in the accident.

The accident accelerated the introduction of the Automatic Warning System, and British Railways agreed to a five-year plan to install the system, which gave drivers an in-cab audible and visual warning when nearing a signal at caution, actuated by magnets between the rails.

== Collision ==
=== Setting ===
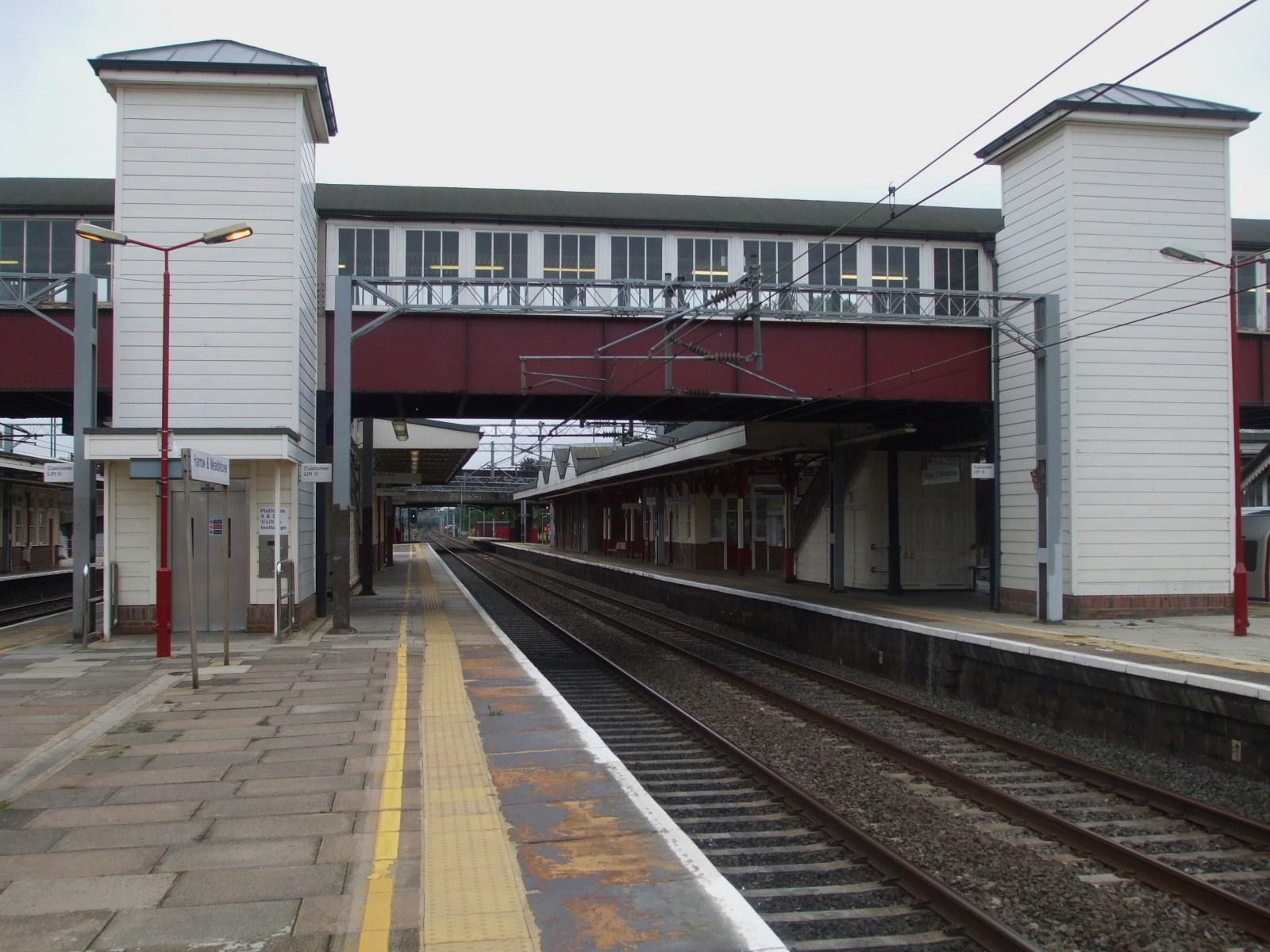
The location of the disaster. The fast WCML platforms 4 and 3, looking south in 2008.

Harrow and Wealdstone station is located on the West Coast Main Line from London to Birmingham, about 11 miles (18 km) from the line's southern terminus at London's Euston station. There are three pairs of running lines through the station. From east to west these are the slow lines, the fast lines of the West Coast Main Line, and the DC electric lines. In each case, the "up" line is southbound towards London Euston; the "down" line is the northbound line towards Watford and Birmingham.

The collisions involved three trains:

1. The 7:31 a.m. Tring to Euston local passenger train—9 carriages carrying approximately 800 passengers hauled by LMS Fowler 2-6-4T Class No. 42389 steam locomotive—standing at the platform on the up fast line.
2. The 8:15 p.m. Perth to Euston night express—11 carriages carrying approximately 85 passengers hauled by LMS Coronation Class No. 46242 City of Glasgow steam locomotive—on the up fast line, running about 80 minutes late because of fog.
3. The 8:00 a.m. express from Euston to Liverpool and Manchester—15 carriages carrying approximately 200 passengers, double headed by LMS Jubilee Class No. 45637 Windward Islands and LMS Princess Royal Class No. 46202 Princess Anne steam locomotives—on the down fast line.

=== Sequence of events ===
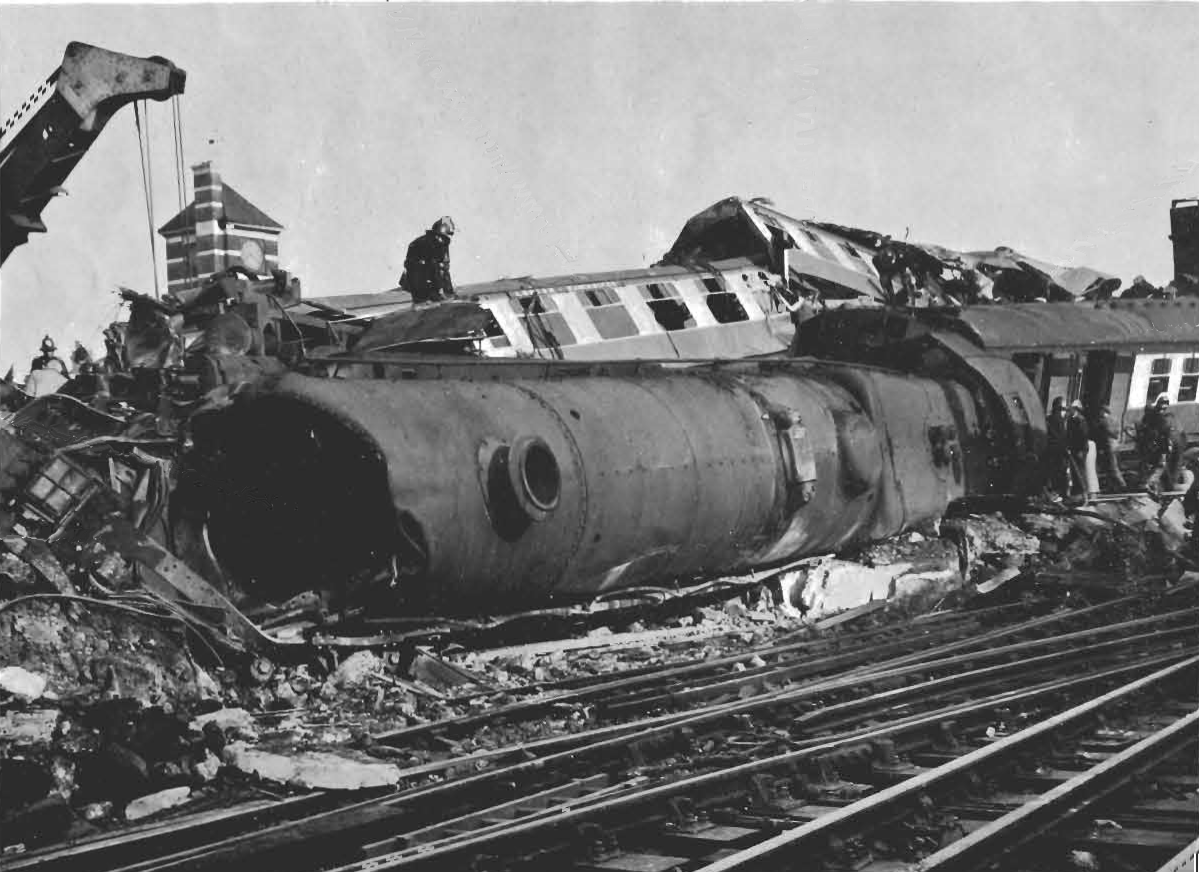
One of the overturned locomotives of the Liverpool train, No. 46202 Princess Anne

On 8 October 1952, at around 8:17 a.m., the local train stopped at platform 4 at Harrow and Wealdstone station, approximately seven minutes late because of fog. Carrying about 800 passengers, it was busier than usual because the next Tring-Euston service had been cancelled. As scheduled, it had travelled from Tring on the slow line, switching to the up fast line just before Harrow and Wealdstone to keep the slow lines to the south of the station clear for empty stock movements. At 8:19 a.m, just as the guard was walking back to his brake van after checking doors on the last two carriages, the Perth express crashed into the rear of the local at a speed of 50–60 miles per hour (80–100 km/h). It had passed a colour light signal at caution and two semaphore signals at danger, and had burst through the trailing points of the crossover from the slow lines, which were still set for the local train. The collision drove the entire local train forward 20 yards (18 m), and completely destroyed the rear three coaches, shattering the wooden bodies of the last two and crushing the steel body of the next to a third of its length; the three were telescoped into the length of little more than one coach. The leading two vans and three coaches of the Perth train piled up behind and above the locomotive.

The wreckage from the first collision was spread across the adjacent down fast line. A few seconds after the first collision, the northbound express to Liverpool Lime Street passed through the station on this line in the opposite direction at approximately 60 miles per hour (100 km/h). The leading locomotive of this train struck the derailed locomotive of the Perth train, which may still have been moving, and was itself derailed. The two locomotives from the Liverpool train were deflected left, mounting the platform, which they ploughed across diagonally before landing on their sides on the adjacent DC electric line, one line of which was short circuited by the wreckage; the other line had its electric current quickly switched off by the signalman, thus preventing any further collisions. The leading seven coaches, plus a kitchen car from the Liverpool train, were carried forward by momentum, overriding the existing wreckage and piling up above and around it. Several of these coaches struck the underside of the station footbridge, tearing away a steel girder.

Sixteen vehicles, including thirteen coaches, two bogie vans and a kitchen car were destroyed or severely damaged in the collisions. Thirteen of these were compressed into a compact heap of wreckage 45 yards (41 m) long, 18 yards (16 m) wide and 6 yards (5.5 m) high. The Perth locomotive was completely buried under the pile of wreckage.

== Aftermath ==
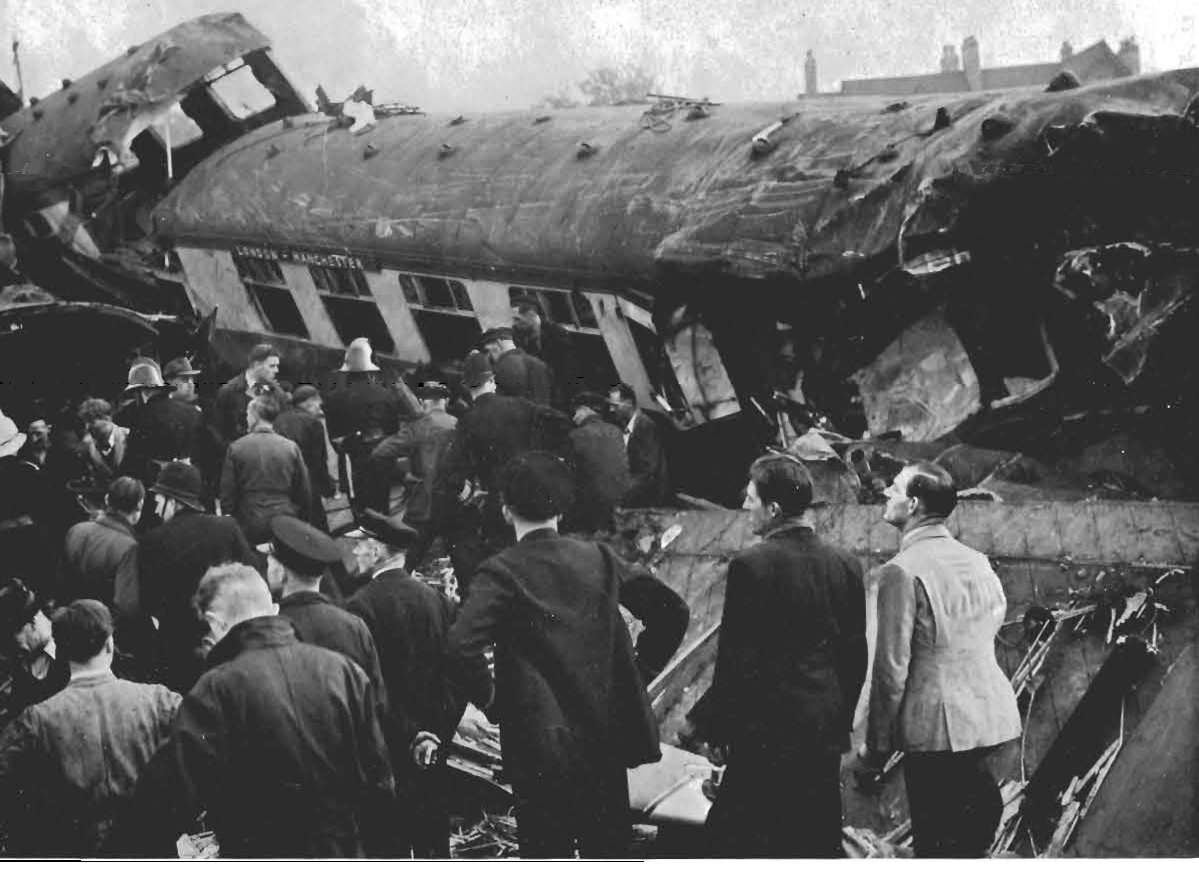
Rescue workers amongst the wreckage

The first emergency response arrived at 8:22 a.m. with the fire brigade, ambulance and police services being assisted by doctors and a medical unit of the United States Air Force, based five miles (8 km) away at RAF South Ruislip. This included Abbie Sweetwine, an African American nurse who became known as "The Angel of Platform Six". Help was accepted from the Salvation Army, the Women's Voluntary Service and local residents. The first loaded ambulance left at 8:27 a.m. and by 12:15 p.m. most of the injured had been taken to hospital. The search for survivors continued until 1:30 the following morning.

All six lines running through the station were closed including the undamaged slow lines to allow the injured access to ambulances that left from the goods yard. The slow lines reopened at 5:32 a.m. the following day. The electric lines were used by cranes to remove the Liverpool locomotives and carriages and reopened 4:30 a.m. on 11 October. The fast lines were reopened, with a speed restriction, at 8:00 p.m. on 12 October and a temporary footbridge was opened the same evening.

== Casualties ==
There were 112 fatalities, including the driver and fireman of the Perth express and the driver of the lead engine of the Liverpool express (the fireman was thrown from the cab by the collision without serious injury). Of the fatalities, 102 perished at the scene, and the remaining 10 died later in hospital from their injuries. Of the 109 passenger fatalities, at least 64 occurred in the local train, 23 in the Perth train, and 7 in the Liverpool train, but where the remaining 14 were from was not clear; some of them may have been standing on the platform and hit by the derailed locomotives of the Liverpool train. A total of 340 people were reported injured: 183 people were given treatment for shock and minor injury at the station and 157 were taken to hospital, of whom 88 were hospitalised.

== Report ==
The Ministry of Transport report on the collision was written by Lt Col GRS Wilson, a senior member of the Railway Inspectorate, and published in June 1953. The local train should have been protected by two semaphore home signals; the Up Fast Inner Home about 190 yards (170 m) to its rear, and the Up Fast Outer Home a further 440 yards (400 m) back. A colour distant signal (the Up Fast Distant) would show green if the Outer Home and Inner Home were both 'clear', or yellow if the Outer Home or Inner Home were at 'danger' and was positioned 1,474 yards (1,348 m) before the Up Fast Outer home; this being the full braking distance for an express at 75 miles per hour (120 km/h), the speed limit for this section of track.

Tests showed no signalling equipment faults and the report was able to dismiss the possibility that the signalman had only changed the route after the Perth train had passed the distant signal at caution. The driver of the Perth train had not slowed his train in response to this signal and had then passed two danger signals before colliding with the Tring train. All the evidence suggested that the driver had made no attempt to stop until the very last moment; eyewitnesses on board the Perth train reported that an emergency brake application was made a few seconds before the collision.

On this section of line, the local 'residential' trains had priority over long-distance expresses at peak time and drivers of late-running expresses would thus often be further delayed, so the Perth express should have been expecting adverse signals. The driver, "a methodical young man", was in good health and there were no signs of a medical emergency or equipment fault that might have distracted the driver from looking for signals. The report discounted the possibility of green colour signals on the adjacent electric lines having been mistaken for the Up Fast Distant, or of signal sighting being seriously impaired by the low sun (9 degrees above the horizon and 17 degrees to the left of the track).

The report noted that while the fog had lifted in the vicinity of Harrow and Wealdstone station, with visibility improving to 200–300 yards (180–270 m), witnesses estimated visibility at the Up Fast Distant to be 50–100 yards (50–90 m). At 50 miles per hour (80 km/h), this would be covered in four seconds or less.

The report went on to speculate:

In these circumstances I can only suggest that ...the driver... must have relaxed his concentration on the signals for some unexplained reason, which may have been quite trivial, at any rate during the few seconds for which the Distant signal could have been seen from the engine at the speed he was running in a deceptive patch of denser fog. Having thus missed the Distant he may have continued forward past Headstone Lane station (which was not on his own side), underestimating the distance he had run from Hatch End and still expecting to see the colour light and not the Harrow semaphore stop signals which were at a considerably higher elevation.

The report considered it surprising that there had been only eight deaths in the leading seven passenger coaches of the Liverpool train; some of these coaches were built to a new British Railways standard (all-steel construction, with buck-eye couplings and bodies welded to the underframe) and seemed to have fared better than older stock.

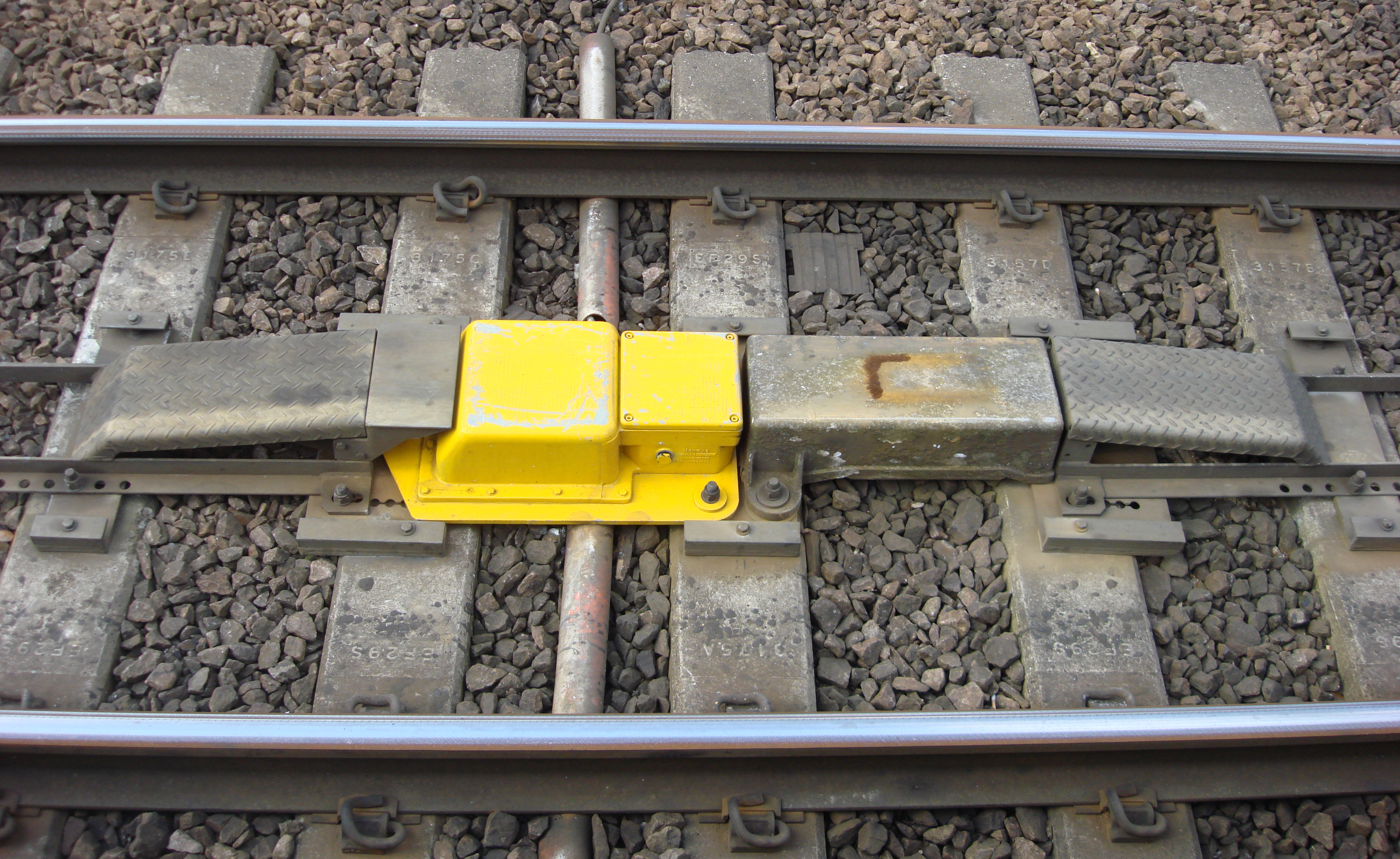
Automatic warning system magnet located between the rails

Railway safety depended on obedience to signals, and the report saw no need for more restrictive ways of working to accommodate driver error;

...the Rules and Regulations for train working in fog have proved adequate in practice with the aid of the professional skill and care which is displayed by engine drivers throughout the country on the vast majority of occasions. The way to guard against the exceptional case of human failure of the kind which occurred at Harrow does not lie in making the regulations more restrictive, with consequent adverse effect on traffic movement, but in reinforcing the vigilance of drivers by apparatus which provides a positive link between the wayside signals and the footplate.

The report considered a system warning drivers that they had passed a signal at caution or danger would have prevented ten per cent of the accidents (and 28% of the consequent deaths) in the previous forty-one years, thereby potentially saving 399 lives, including the 112 at Harrow. British Railways was already developing a system that warned drivers that they were approaching a distant signal at caution, and automatically applied the brakes unless this was acknowledged by the driver. By the time the report had been published, a five-year plan had been agreed to install the Automatic Warning System on 1,332 miles (2,144 km) of line.

The very occasional failures which have occurred give no grounds for loss of confidence in British railway engine drivers as a whole, and there is no reason to believe that the problem has become more urgent in the last few years, notwithstanding the exceptionally tragic results of one such failure at Harrow. All, however, are agreed that enginemen should be given their share of technical aids to safe working, and I consider that at this late stage there should be no reservations on the rate of progress once the apparatus has been approved.

== Legacy ==
The accident accelerated the introduction of British Railways' Automatic Warning System (AWS), which had received scepticism by some industry expenditure-prioritising experts who theorised more lives would be saved by installing more track circuits and colour light signals. By 1977, one third of British Rail tracks had been fitted with AWS.

After the accident, experts criticised the local layout of the track: the Tring train had to stop at the platform on the fast line, and to minimise the length of the operating rods between the points and the signal-box, the junction between slow and fast lines lay beyond the station. The junction was changed in 1962.

A memorial plaque for the disaster was unveiled in 2002 to mark the 50th anniversary. A mural along the bordering road, featuring scenes from Wealdstone's history, was painted by children from local schools and dedicated in memory of the victims.

The Dutch pop group The Nits wrote a song titled "Harrow Accident".

A chest belonging to one of the victims was repaired in the S11E19 episode of The Repair Shop aired 26 January 2023.

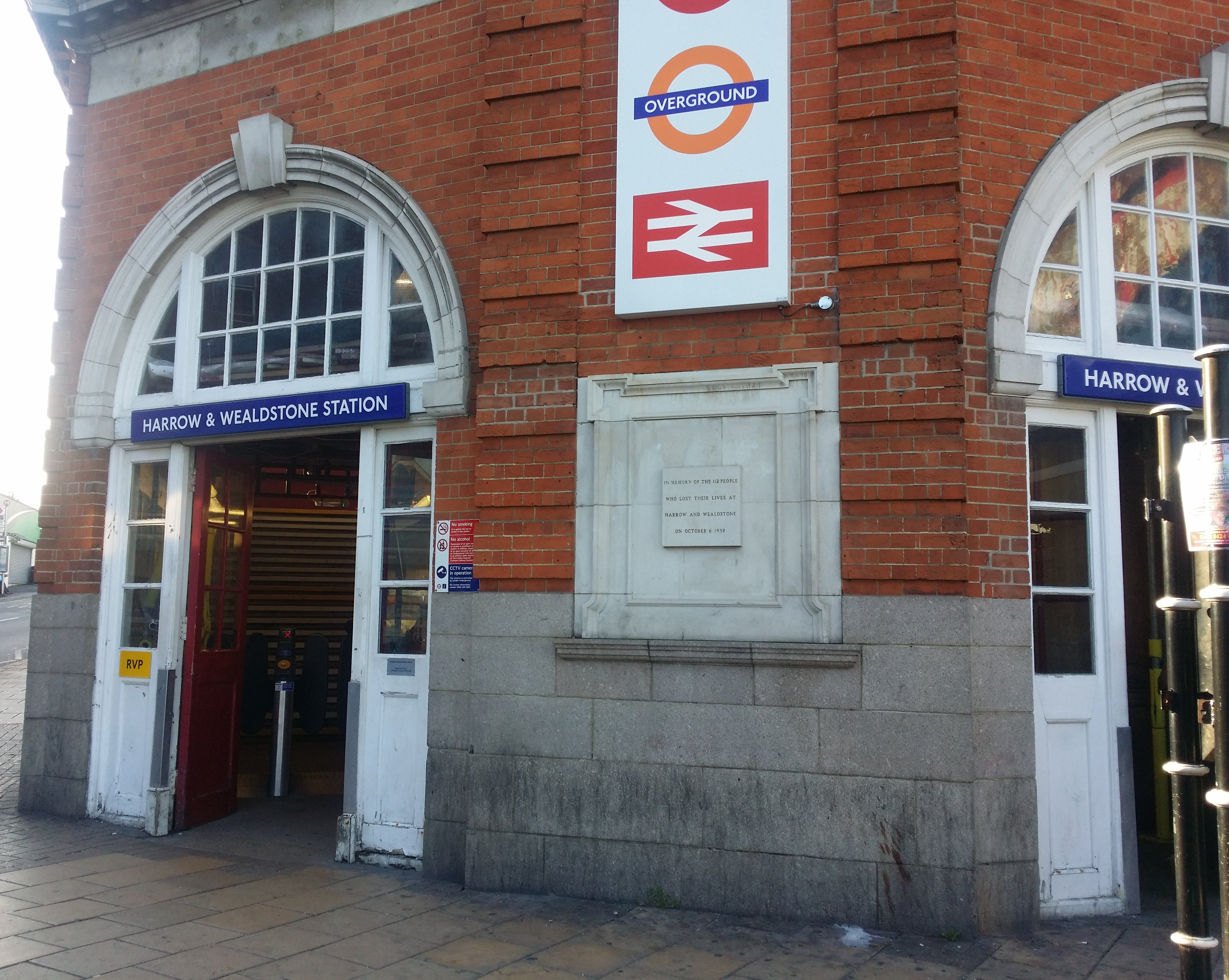
The north entrance to Harrow and Wealdstone railway station where a memorial to the disaster that occurred there in 1952 was unveiled fifty years later

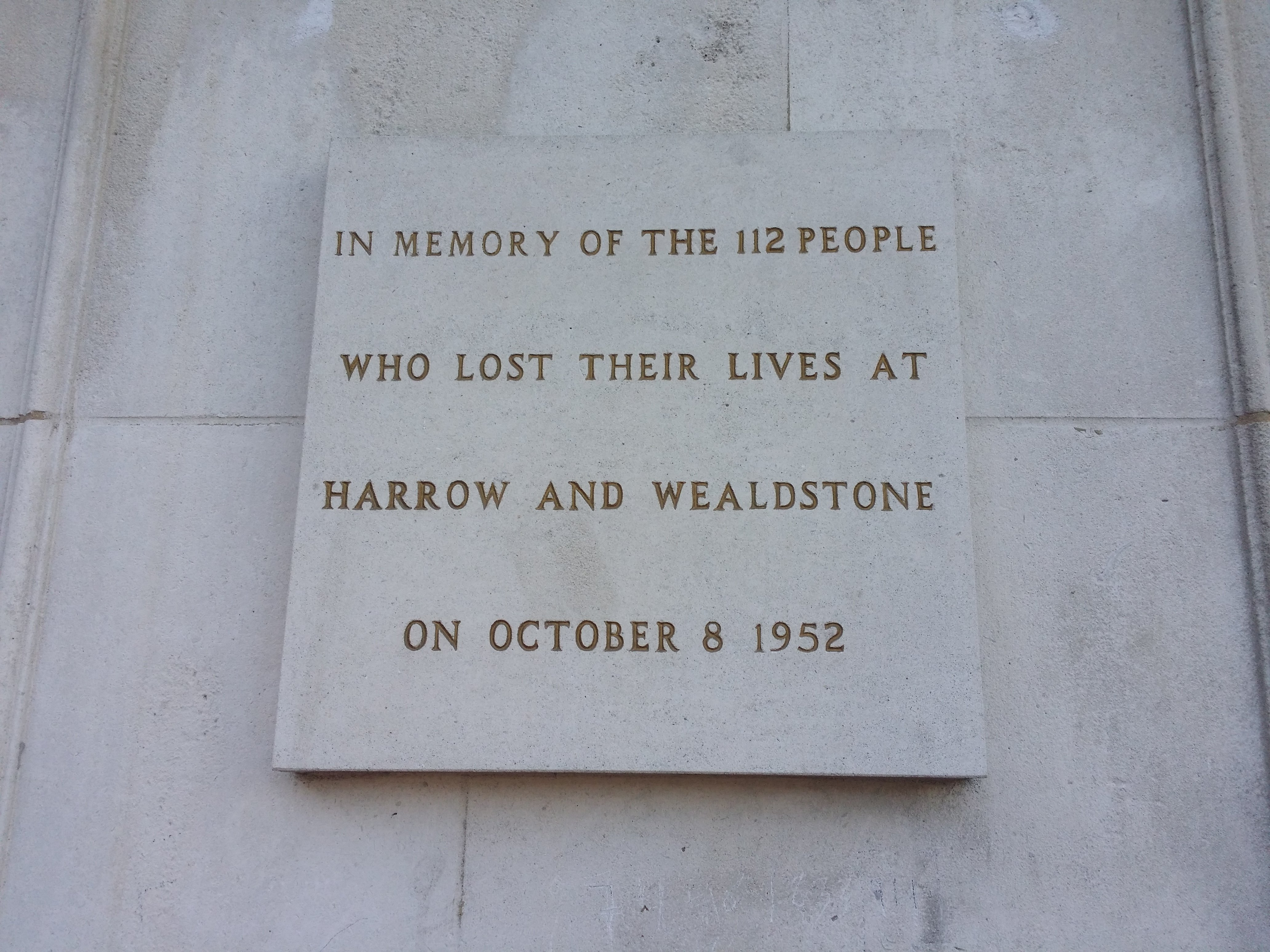
The disaster memorial stone plaque on display at the north entrance of Harrow and Wealdstone railway station

== Locomotives ==
- The leading locomotive hauling the Liverpool train was No. 45637 Jubilee Class 4-6-0 Windward Islands. This locomotive was completely destroyed in the accident, having borne the brunt of the impact, and its remains were scrapped.
- The second locomotive of the Liverpool train was No. 46202 Princess Royal Class 4-6-2 Princess Anne, which was a rebuild in conventional form from the experimental steam turbine Turbomotive and had been in service as Princess Anne for only a few months. It took serious damage in the crash, having its leading bogie torn off and main frames buckled, and was scrapped after being deemed beyond economic repair. The loss of this locomotive led to the introduction of the BR Standard Class 8P Pacific, an experimental three-cylinder 4-6-2 No. 71000 Duke of Gloucester, which is today preserved.
- The Perth train had been hauled by No. 46242 Coronation Class 4-6-2 City of Glasgow. This was badly damaged, but went on to be rebuilt, and remained in service until 1963 when the locomotive was scrapped.
- The Tring train had been hauled by an LMS Fowler 2-6-4T No. 42389 running bunker first. This locomotive was undamaged and also remained in service until 1963, and also scrapped.

Nameplates from Windward Islands and Princess Anne were acquired by the Doncaster Grammar School Railway Society, and are on display at the Doncaster Railway Heritage Centre.

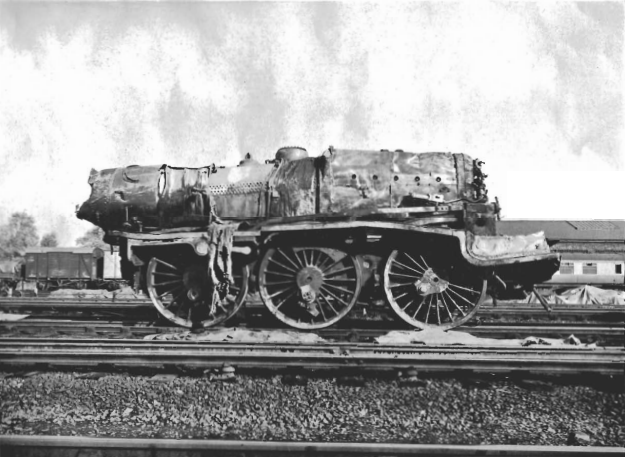
The remains of 45637 Jubilee Class 4-6-0 Windward Islands.

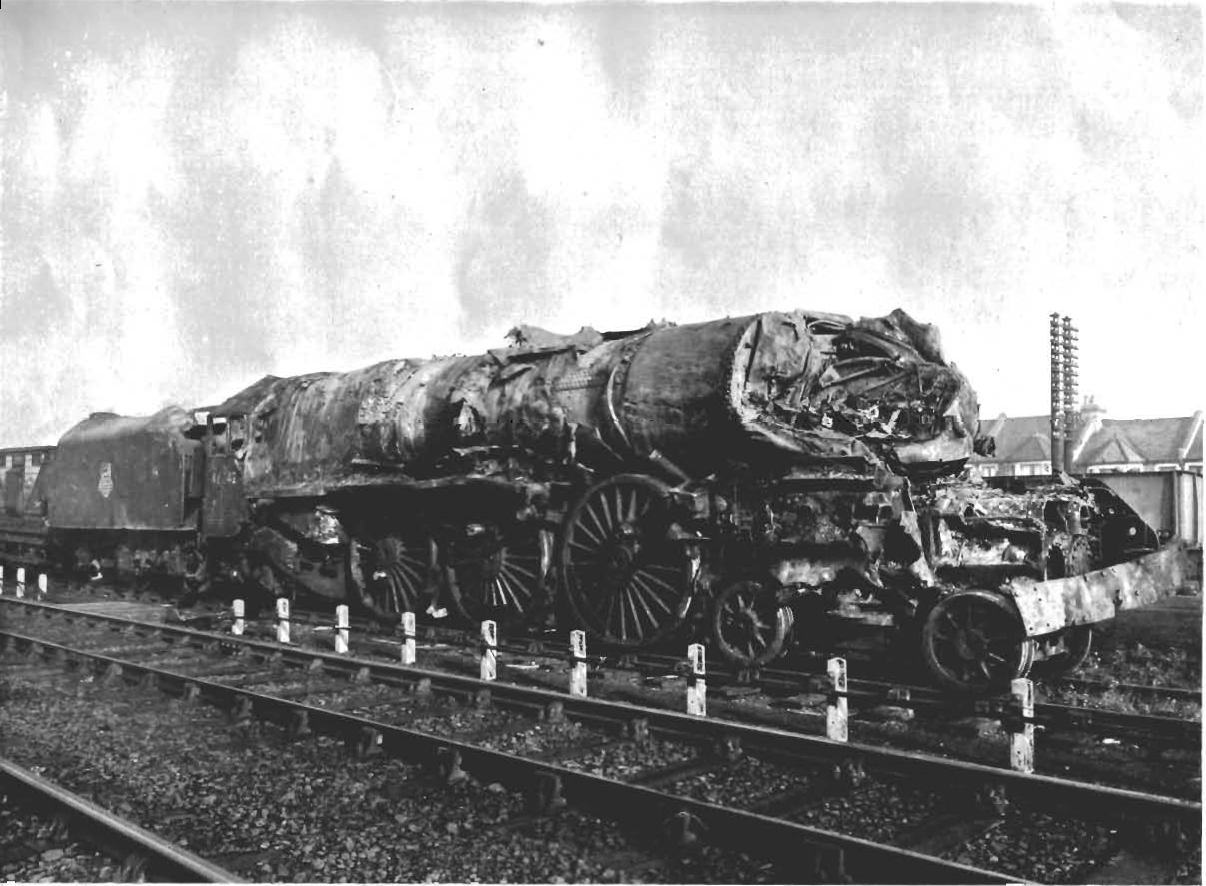
The badly damaged Perth locomotive City of Glasgow after the crash. This was rebuilt.
