= William Stanier =

English railway engineer (1876–1965)

Sir William A. Stanier FRS
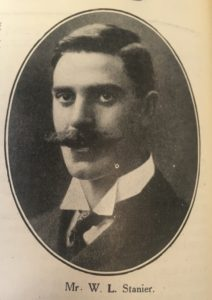
- Stanier in 1913
- Born: 27 May 1876; Swindon, Wiltshire, England
- Died: 27 September 1965 (aged 89); Watford, Hertfordshire, England
- Spouse: Ella Elizabeth Morse
- Children: 2

Sir William Arthur Stanier (27 May 1876 – 27 September 1965) was an English railway engineer, and was chief mechanical engineer of the London, Midland and Scottish Railway.

== Biography ==
Sir William Arthur Stanier was born in Swindon, where his father worked for the Great Western Railway (GWR) as William Dean's Chief Clerk, and educated at Swindon High School and also, for a single year, at Wycliffe College.

In 1891 he followed his father into a career with the GWR, initially as an office boy and then for five years as an apprentice in the workshops. Between 1897 and 1900 he worked in the Drawing Office as a draughtsman, before becoming Inspector of Materials in 1900. In 1904, George Jackson Churchward appointed him as Assistant to the Divisional Locomotive Superintendent in London. In 1912 he returned to Swindon to become the Assistant Works Manager and in 1920 was promoted to the post of Works Manager.

In late 1931, he was "headhunted" by Sir Josiah Stamp, chairman of the London, Midland and Scottish Railway (LMS), to become the Chief Mechanical Engineer (CME) of that railway from 1 January 1932. He was charged with introducing modern and more powerful locomotive designs, using his knowledge gained with the GWR at Swindon. Stanier built many successful designs for the LMS, particularly the "Black 5" mixed traffic 4-6-0 and the 8F 2-8-0 freight locomotive. His Princess Coronation Class 4-6-2 No.6220 Coronation set a new British record of 114 mph, beating the previous record set by a Gresley A4.

During WWII, Stanier worked as a consultant for the Ministry of Supply, and retired in 1944. He was knighted on 9 February 1943 and elected a Fellow of the Royal Society on his retirement, only the third locomotive engineer after Edward Bury and Robert Stephenson to receive that honour. He was also president of the Institution of Mechanical Engineers for 1944, and was a vice president of the Stephenson Locomotive Society for a number of years until his death in 1965. He was elected an honorary member of the American Society of Mechanical Engineers in 1945.

He died in Rickmansworth in 1965. In 1906, he had married Ella Elizabeth, daughter of Levi L Morse. They had a son and a daughter.

== Locomotive designs ==
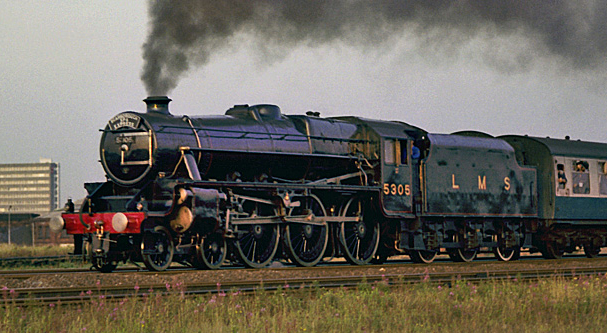
LMS Stanier 5MT 4-6-0 'Black Five' class locomotive number 5305

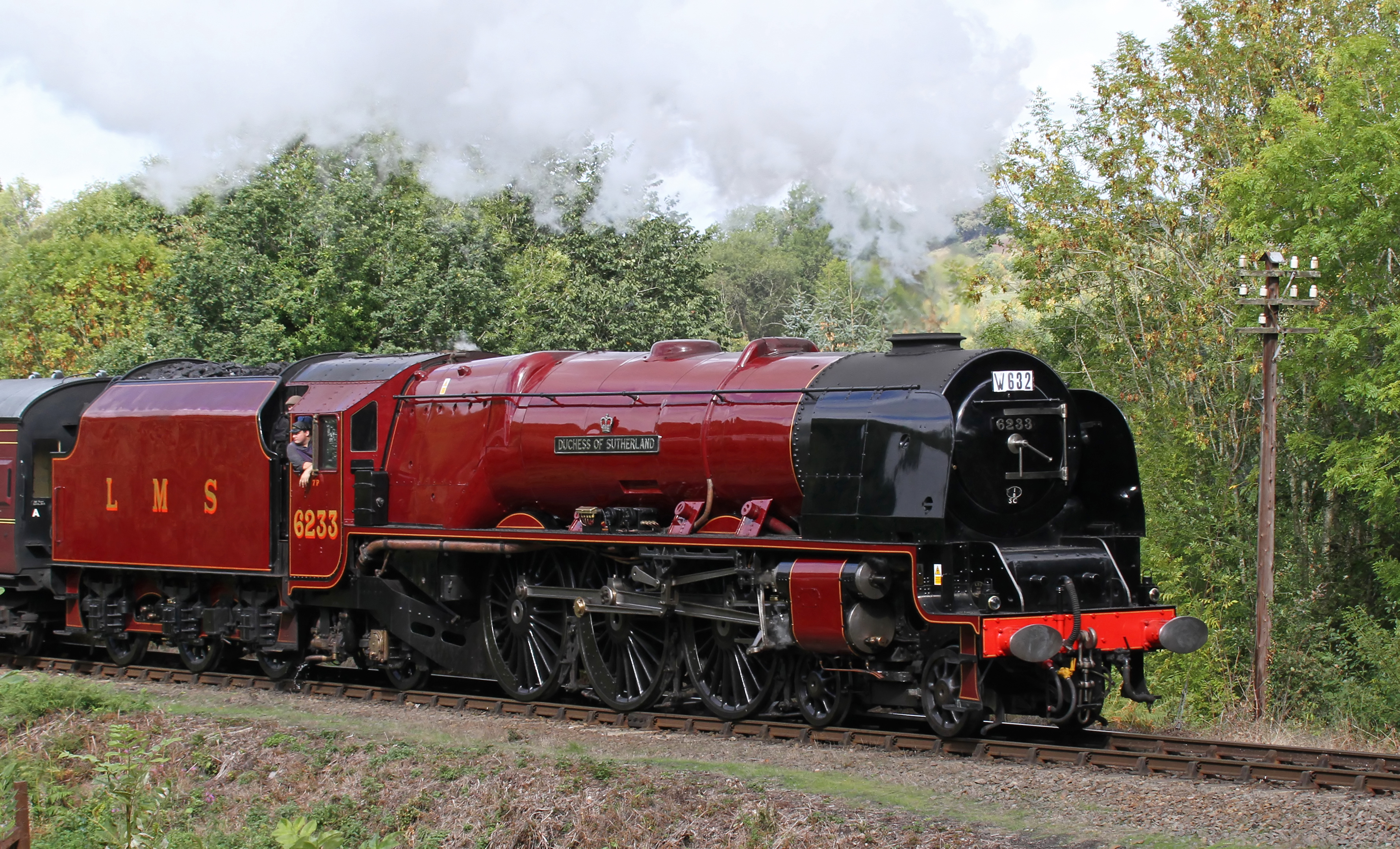
LMS Coronation Class 4-6-2 No 6233 Duchess of Sutherland

William Stanier, with the backing of Sir Josiah Stamp, chairman of the company, reversed the small engine policy, which the LMS had inherited from the Midland Railway, with beneficial results.

Locomotive designs introduced by Stanier include:

- LMS Class 2P 0-4-4T (designed in the Midland Railway design office)
- LMS Class 3MT 2-6-2T
- LMS Class 4MT 2-6-4T (3-cyl)
- LMS Class 4MT 2-6-4T (2-cyl)
- LMS Class 5P4F 2-6-0
- LMS Class 5MT "Black Five" 4-6-0
- LMS Class 6P "Jubilee" 4-6-0
- LMS Rebuilt Royal Scot Class
- LMS Class 8P "Princess Royal" 4-6-2
- LMS Class 8P "Princess Coronation" 4-6-2 Pacific
- LMS Class 8F 2-8-0
- LMS Turbomotive

== Legacy ==
Stanier's designs were a strong influence on the later British Railways standard classes of steam locomotives designed by R A Riddles, who adopted LMS design principles in preference to those of the other "Big Four" railway companies.

There is a secondary school in Crewe called Sir William Stanier School.

== Bibliography ==
- Ellis, Hamilton (1970). London Midland & Scottish - A Railway in Retrospect. Ian Allan Ltd. ISBN 0-7110-0048-4.
- Nock, O.S. (1982). A History of the LMS - II - The record-breaking Thirties 1931-39. George Allen & Unwin. ISBN 0-04-385093-6.

Business positions
Preceded by Ernest Lemon	Chief Mechanical Engineer of the London, Midland and Scottish Railway; 1932–1944	Succeeded by Charles Fairburn
Professional and academic associations
Preceded by Asa Binns	President of the Institution of Mechanical Engineers; 1944	Succeeded by Col Stephen Joseph Thompson
