= Crewe Works =

British railway engineering facility

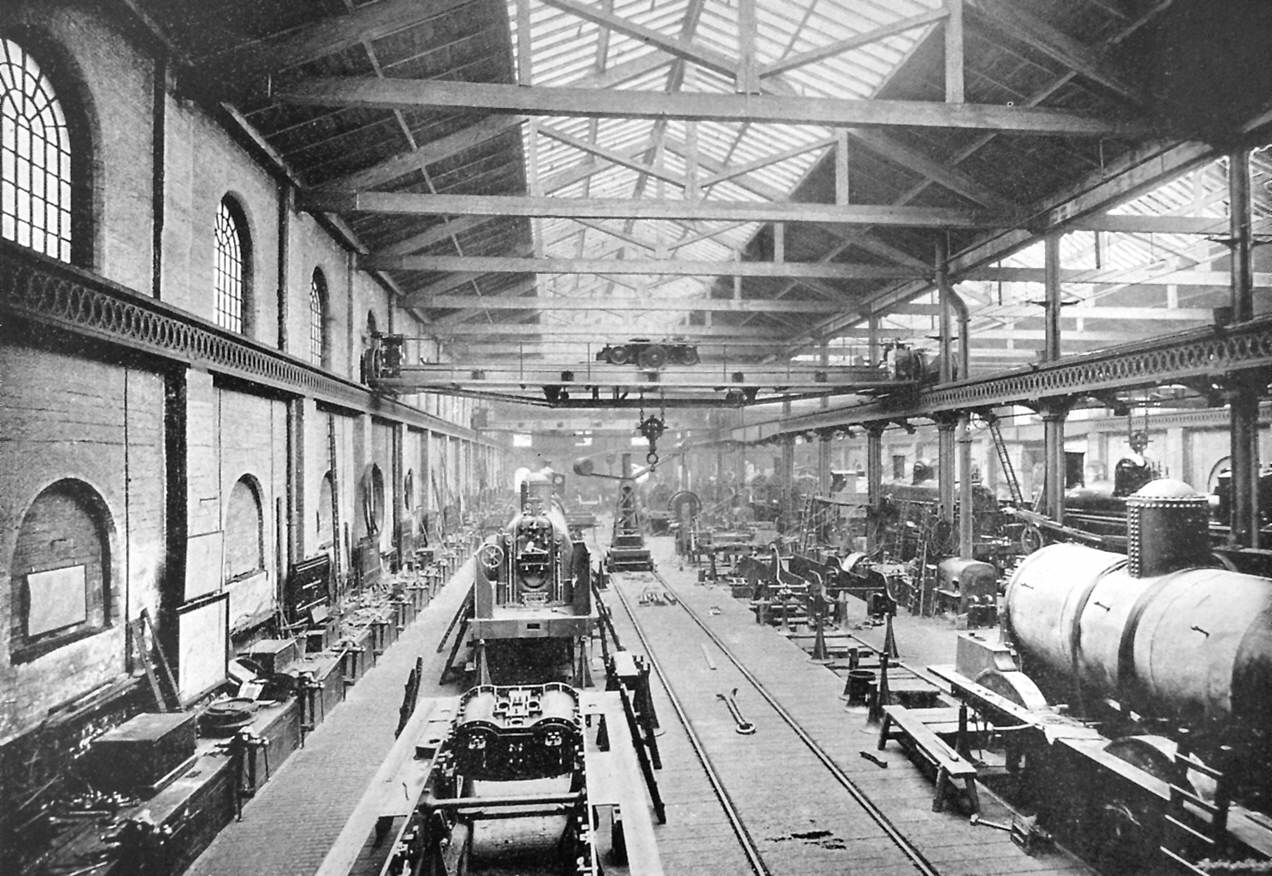
- The erecting shop at the LNWR's Crewe Works, c. 1890
- Operated: 1840-present
- Location: Crewe, Cheshire
- Coordinates: 53.10°N 2.46°W
- Industry: Railway rolling stock manufacture
- Products: Steam, diesel and electric locomotives

Crewe Works is a railway engineering facility located in the town of Crewe, in Cheshire, England. It was opened originally by the Grand Junction Railway in March 1843 and employed 7-8,000 workers at its peak. In the 1980s, much of the engineering works were closed; most of the site has since been redeveloped, but the remaining parts are owned and operated by Alstom.

During the late 19th century, the London and North Western Railway (LNWR) used Crewe Works to produce many famous locomotives, such as the Webb 2-4-0 Jumbo class and the compounds, the Whale Experiment and Precursor classes, and the Bowen-Cooke Claughtons. In particular, Whale's 1912 superheated G1 Class 0-8-0 developed from a locomotive introduced by Webb in 1892, lasted, in many cases until 1964, near the end of steam in 1968.

After grouping, the works were taken over by London, Midland and Scottish Railway (LMS), the successor to the LNWR. It was during this period that the works reached its zenith in size and output. Creating notable steam engines such as Sir William Stanier's locomotives as well as the 'Jubilee' and Class 5 4-6-0s, the 'Princess Royal' and the 'Princess Coronation' 4-6-2s.

The works continued to produce engines under British Railways, such as the Britannia 4-6-2s and the Franco-Crosti boilered Class 9 freight locomotives. In the 1980s, a large part of the works was sold for redevelopment. Due to the scale of the works, it had its own internal narrow gauge tramway, the Crewe Works Railway, which was used from 1862 until 1932.

== History ==
=== Grand Junction Railway ===
The directors of the Grand Junction Railway determined to construct a works on a 3 acres (12,000 m^{2}) site at Crewe in 1840 with the first locomotive, No. 32Tamerlane completed in October 1843. By 1846, the demand for space was such that wagon building was moved, first to Edge Hill and Manchester, then to a new works at Earlestown. By 1848, the works employed over 1,000 producing one locomotive a week.

=== London and North Western Railway ===
In 1845, the Liverpool and Manchester Railway was merged with the Grand Junction. These, in turn, merged in 1846, with the London and Birmingham Railway and the Manchester and Birmingham Railway to form the London and North Western Railway (LNWR). All four had their own workshops but, in time, locomotive building was concentrated at Crewe.

In 1857, John Ramsbottom became Locomotive Superintendent. He had previously invented the first reliable safety valve and the scoop for picking up water from troughs between the tracks. He went on to improve the precision and interchangeability of tools and components.

In 1862, locomotive work was transferred from Wolverton. Wolverton became the carriage works, while wagon building was concentrated at Earlestown.

In 1853, Crewe had begun to make its own wrought iron and roll its own rails, and in 1864 installed a Bessemer converter for manufacturing steel. In 1868, it became the first place to use open-hearth furnaces on an industrial scale; it also built its own brickworks. Later the works was fitted with two electric arc furnaces.

Production increased steadily and, with the sale to the Lancashire and Yorkshire Railway of ten 2-4-0 and eighty six 0-6-0 locomotives, privately-owned manufacturers took out an injunction in 1876 to restrain the railway from producing anything but its own needs. This remained in force until British Rail Engineering Limited was established in 1969.

By 1920, Crewe Works had grown into a poorly laid-out establishment with nine separate erecting shops, four of which could only handle smaller locomotives. The LNWR sanctioned plans for a new large erecting shop, which placed on hold until it was revised and implemented later by the LMS.

=== London, Midland and Scottish Railway ===
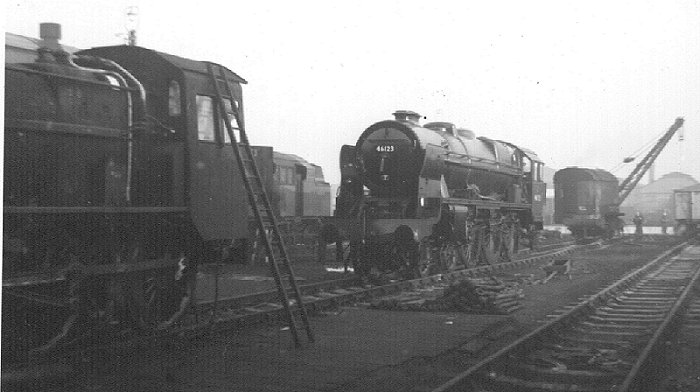
Rebuilt Royal Scot Class No. 46123 Royal Irish Fusilers receiving attention at Crewe Works with other locomotives

When the LNWR became part of the LMS in 1923, its passenger locomotives were eclipsed by those of the former Midland Railway, which offered light, fast and frequent services. As traffic density increased, there was a need for longer trains and more powerful locomotives to haul them. In 1932, William Stanier became chief mechanical engineer and set out to rationalise production.

There followed the Princesses and Duchesses, along with the Jubilees and the "Black Fives". Crewe produced all the new boilers for the LMS, and all heavy drop stampings and forgings. It also produced most of the heavy steel components for the track and other structures. The 1935 documentary No. 6207; A Study in Steel about the construction of an LMS Princess Royal Class engine was filmed at the works.

During World War II, Crewe produced over 150 Covenanter tanks for the army.

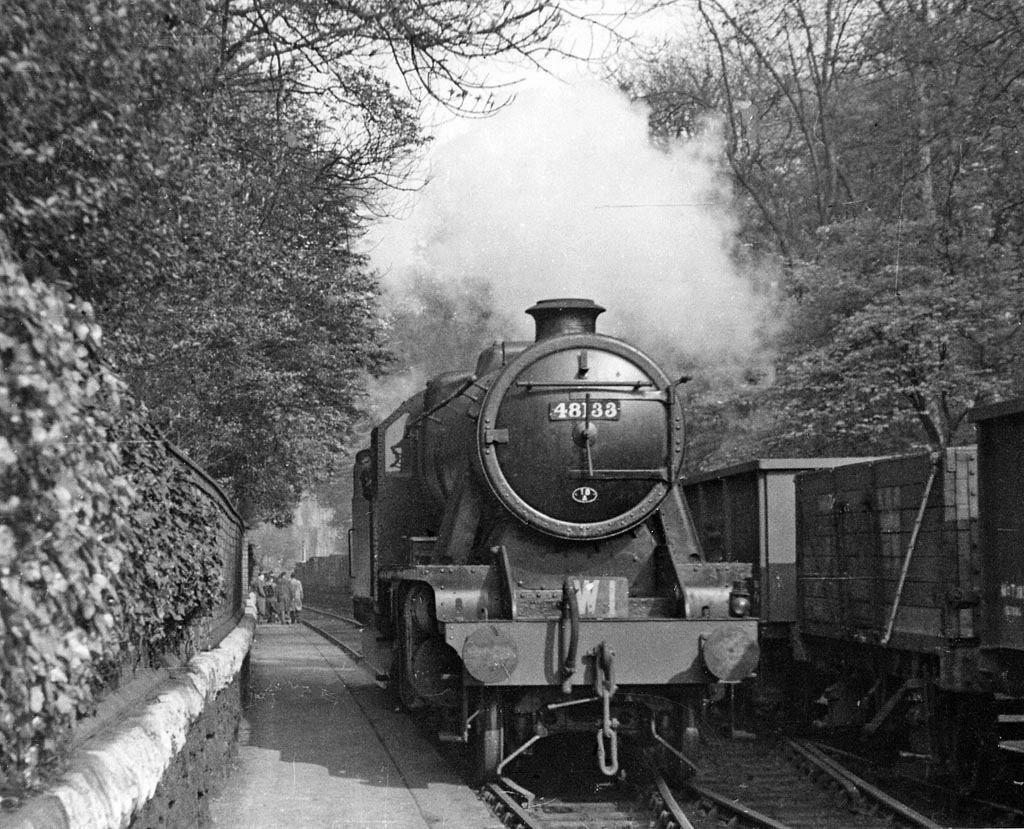
Stanier 8F 2-8-0 48133 on the Crewe Works internal railway in 1948

=== British Railways ===
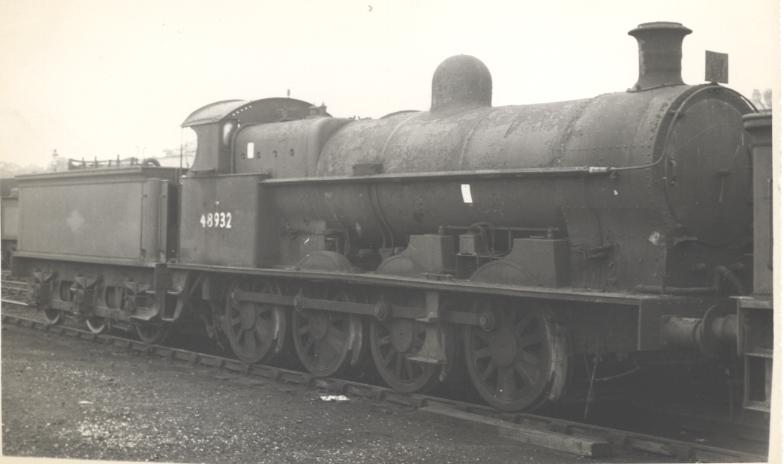
Bowen-Cooke Class G2a 0-8-0 No. 48932, built at Crewe in 1902 as a Webb Class B four-cylinder loco, was later rebuilt to two-cylinder status. Buxton shed August 1960.

After British Railways (BR) was formed in 1948, Robert Riddles introduced the BR standard classes, and Crewe built Britannia and Clan mixed-traffic engines and some of the Class 9F freight locomotives. The last steam locomotive built at Crewe, Class 9F number 92250, was completed in December 1958. Crewe Works built 7,331 steam locomotives.

Diesel production commenced, with D5030 the first main line example completed in 1959. The final type of diesel locomotives built at Crewe Works was the Class 56, with the last completed in 1984; the last type of electric locomotives was the Class 91, with the last completed in 1991.

== Modern ownership ==
Crewe Works became a part of British Rail Engineering Limited, when the former BR Workshops were set up as a separate business in 1969 and was privatised in 1989. In the mid-1980s, much of the Crewe Works site was cleared and sold for major redevelopment. Around this time, British Rail Engineering Limited was sold to ABB. By 1996, its railway business merged with Daimler Benz to form Adtranz, which was itself taken over by Bombardier in 2001. With the sale of Bombardier Transportation to Alstom in January 2021, the plant became part of Alstom UK & Ireland.

At its height, Crewe Works employed between 7,000 and 8,000 people; in 2005, fewer than 1,000 remained on site, with a further 270 redundancies announced in November of that year. Current work is largely focused on general maintenance and the inspection of seriously damaged stock. Much of the site once occupied by the works has been sold off and is now occupied by a supermarket, leisure park and a large health centre. In 2019, another part of Crewe Works was demolished for a new housing estate.

In December 2021, the contract for delivery of HS2 rolling stock was awarded to a partnership between Hitachi Rail and Alstom; the latter's share in the manufacture of the 54 trains will take place at Derby Litchurch Lane Works and Crewe Works. All of the bogies, which house the wheelsets, will be both assembled and maintained at Alstom's Crewe facility.
