= Coronation Scot =

Named express passenger train

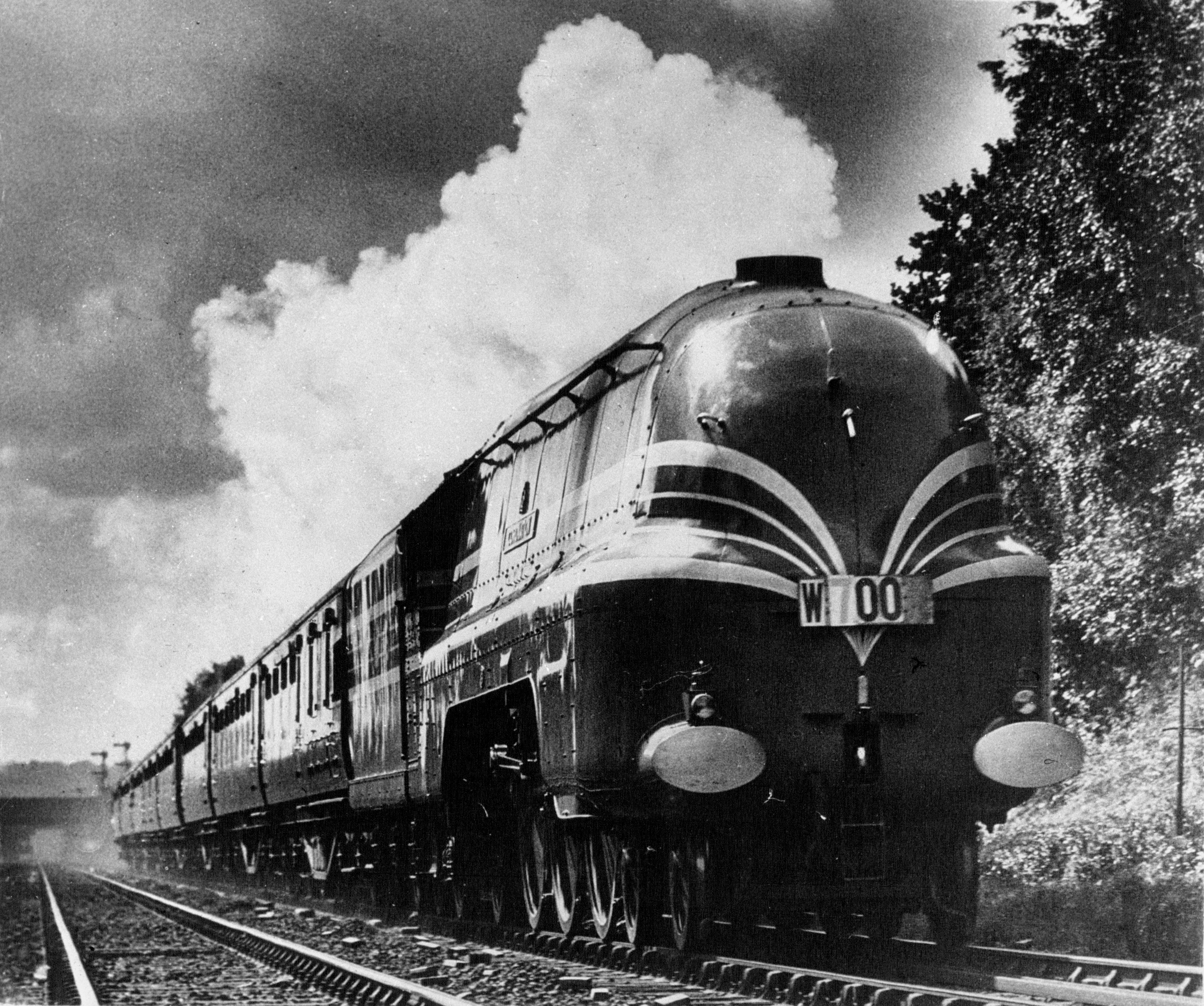
Streamlined Coronation Scot train at speed on the London-Glasgow route in 1937

The Coronation Scot was a named express passenger train of the London, Midland and Scottish Railway inaugurated in 1937 for the coronation of King George VI and Queen Elizabeth which ran until the start of the war in 1939. It ran on the West Coast Main Line between London (Euston station) and Glasgow (Central station), stopping at Carlisle for crew change and to pick up and set down passengers to and from London only. The service was designed to compete with the rival services on the East Coast Main Line, for prestigious London to Scotland traffic. It was scheduled to complete the journey from London to Glasgow in 6 hours 30 minutes.

== Locomotives and trains ==
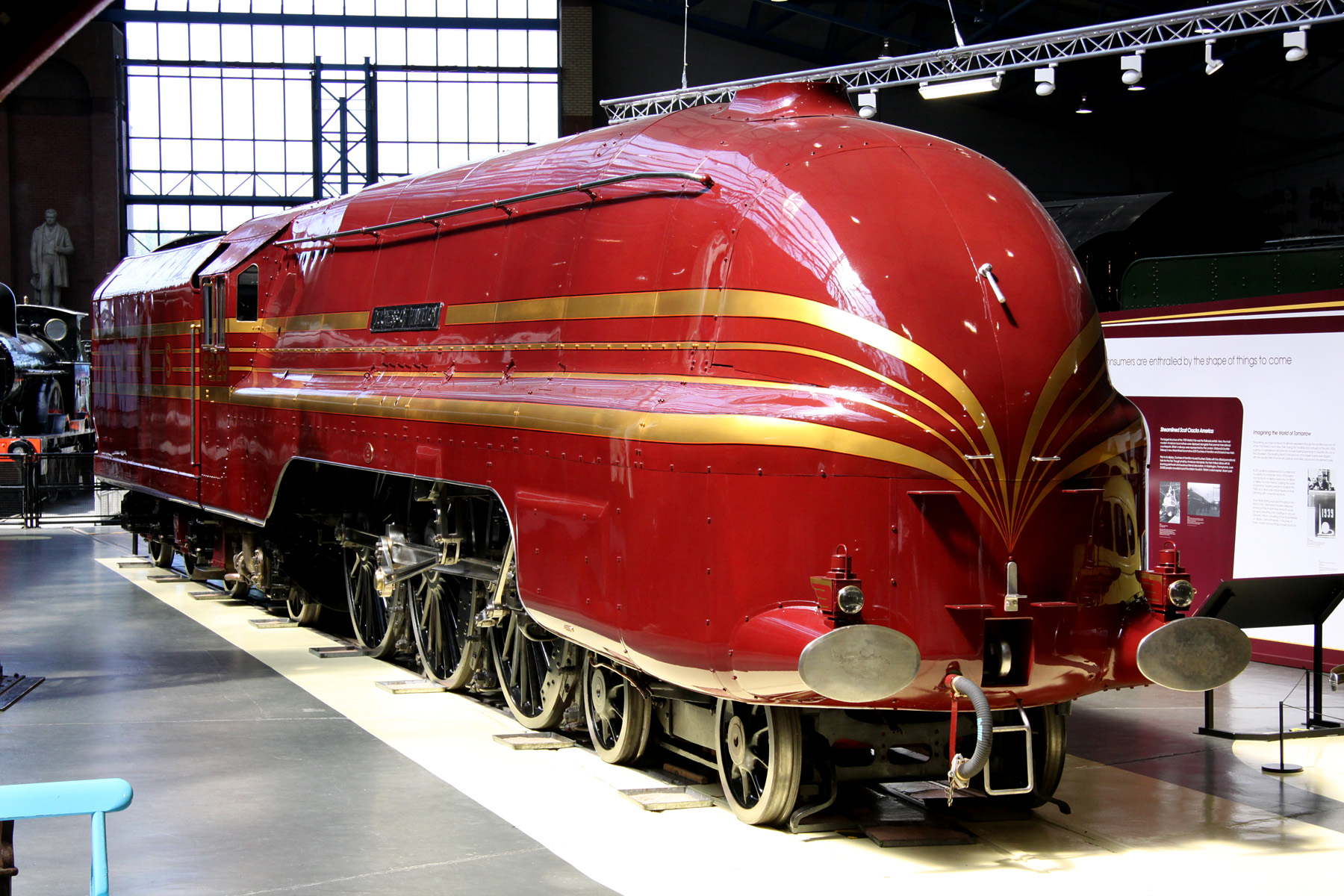
Streamlined Coronation Class locomotive, used for the service. The first five were originally painted blue with silver lines; the next fifteen streamlined locos were crimson and gold as shown here

The streamlined Coronation Class locomotives were specially developed for the service, and were amongst the most powerful steam locomotives to operate on British railways. On a press run preparatory to the introduction of the service in June 1937, LMS Coronation Class 6220 Coronation, newly built, achieved a speed of 114 miles per hour (183 km/h) near Crewe.

Three trainsets were formed from existing carriages and given a blue livery similar in colour to that previously used by the Caledonian Railway (the LMS' normal livery was the crimson lake of the former Midland Railway). The first five of the Coronation Class pacifics were also turned out in blue with silver "cheat lines".

The Coronation Scot ran only on weekdays and during summer weekends. Two of the carriage sets were used on other trains; the spare set was kept at LMS's Wolverton Works.

== Formation ==
The train formation was (first class towards London end):

- Brake Corridor First (BFK) to D1910
- Corridor First (FK) to D1930
- Restaurant Open First (RFO) to D1902
- Kitchen Car (RK) to D1912
- Open Third (TO) to D1904
- Open Third (TO) to D1904
- Kitchen Car (RK) to D1912
- Open Third (TO) to D1904
- Brake Corridor Third (BTK) to D1905

LMS coaching staff notice ERO 4522590-02 stipulated the formation. Photographic evidence suggests that the sets were turned so that first class always ran at the rear of the train. Sometimes a different formation ran on a Monday after carriages had been used on other services at weekends.

All passenger cars were equipped with air-conditioning ventilation, adjustable by individual passengers to give any desired temperature within the provided range.

== Music ==
A popular piece of light orchestral music celebrating The Coronation Scot was composed by Vivian Ellis. This was used as the theme tune for the BBC Radio programme Paul Temple.

== See also ==
- Race to the north
- Royal Scot (train)
- The Coronation (train)
