= LMS Coronation Class =

Class of 38 British 4-6-2 locomotives

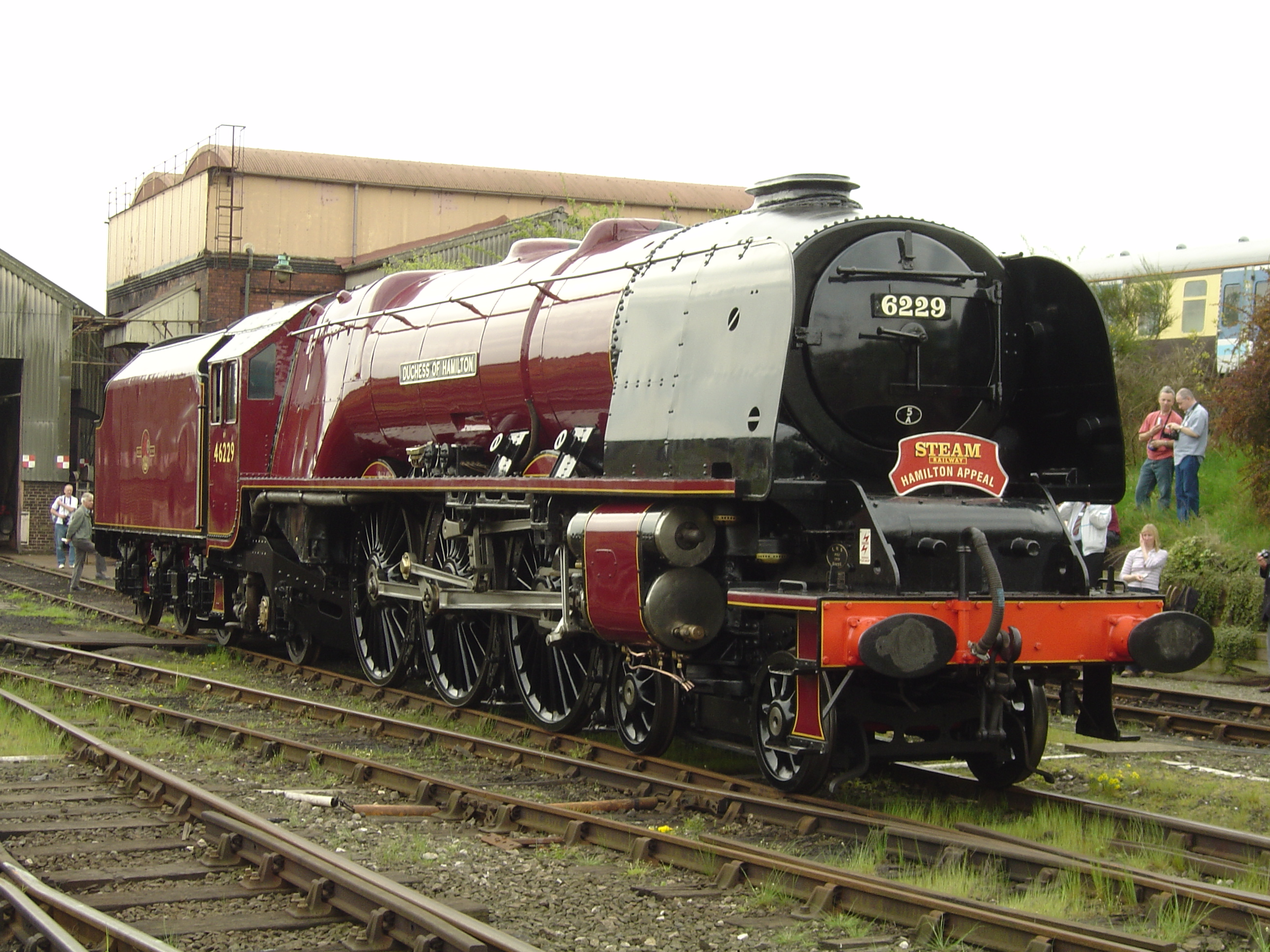
- No. 6229 Duchess of Hamilton
Type and origin
- Power type: Steam
- Designer: William Stanier
- Builder: LMS Crewe Works
- Build date: 1937–1948
- Total produced: 38
Specifications
- Configuration
  - Whyte: 4-6-2
  - UIC: 2′C1′ h4
- Gauge: 4 ft 8 1/2 in (1,435 mm)
- Leading dia.: 3 ft 0 in (0.914 m)
- Driver dia.: 6 ft 9 in (2.057 m)
- Trailing dia.: 3 ft 9 in (1.143 m)
- Minimum curve: 6 chains (120 m) normal; 4 1/2 chains (91 m) dead slow
- Wheelbase: 62 ft 11 in (19.177 m)
  - Engine: 37 ft 0 in (11.278 m)
  - Drivers: 14 ft 6 in (4.420 m)
  - Tender: 15 ft 0 in (4.57 m)
- Length: Streamlined: 73 ft 9 3/4 in (22.498 m); Conventional: 73 ft 10 1/4 in (22.511 m)
- Height: 13 ft 3 in (4.039 m)
- Loco weight: Streamlined: 108.1 long tons (121 short tons; 110 t); Conventional: 105.25 long tons (117.88 short tons; 106.94 t); 6256/6257: 108.5 long tons (122 short tons; 110 t)
- Tender weight: 6220–6255: 56.35 long tons (63.11 short tons; 57.25 t); 6256/6257: 56.50 long tons (63.28 short tons; 57.41 t)
- Fuel type: Coal
- Fuel capacity: 10 long tons (11.2 short tons; 10.2 t)
- Water cap.: 4,000 imp gal (18,000 L; 4,800 US gal)
- Firebox
  - Type
  - Grate area: 50 sq ft (4.6 m^{2})
- Boiler
  - Model: LMS type 1X
  - Tube plates: 19 ft 3 in (5.867 m)
  - Small tubes: 2 3/8 in (60 mm), 129 off
  - Large tubes: 5 1/8 in (130 mm), 40 off
- Boiler pressure: 250 psi (1.72 MPa)
- Heating surface
  - Firebox: 230 sq ft (21 m^{2})
  - Tubes and flues: 2,577 sq ft (239.4 m^{2})
  - Total surface: 2,807 sq ft (260.8 m^{2})
- Superheater
  - Heating area: 6220–6255: 822 sq ft (76.4 m^{2}); 6256/6257: 856 sq ft (79.5 m^{2})
- Cylinders: 4
- Cylinder size: 16 1/2 in × 28 in (419 mm × 711 mm)
- Valve gear: Walschaerts for outside cylinders with rocking shafts for inside cylinders
- Valve type: Piston valves
Performance figures
- Tractive effort: 40,000 lbf (180 kN)
Career
- Operators: London, Midland and Scottish Railway; British Railways
- Power class: LMS: 7P; BR: 8P
- Numbers: LMS: 6220–6256; BR: 46220–46257
- Locale: West Coast Main Line
- Withdrawn: 1962–1964
- Preserved: 6229, 6233, 6235
- Disposition: Three preserved, remainder scrapped

The London, Midland and Scottish Railway (LMS) Coronation Class (Note: Known as Princess Coronation Class on some very early documents, but that name not used thereafter) is a class of express passenger steam locomotives designed by William Stanier. They were an enlarged and improved version of his previous design, the LMS Princess Royal Class, and on test were some of the most powerful steam locomotives ever used in Britain at 2,511 dbhp. The locomotives were specifically designed for power as it was intended to use them on express services between London Euston and Glasgow Central; their duties were to include the hauling of a proposed non-stop express, subsequently named the Coronation Scot.

The first ten locomotives of the Coronation class were built in a streamlined form in 1937 by the addition of a steel streamlined casing. Five of these ten were specifically set aside to pull the Coronation Scot. Although a later batch of five unstreamlined locomotives was produced in 1938, most of the ensuing Coronation class were outshopped as streamliners. From 1944 until production ended in 1948, all-new engines were built in unstreamlined form and all the streamliners had their casings removed. The last of the 38 locomotives was completed in 1948.

The Coronation class was probably painted in more styles of livery than any other engine class; seven in the LMS era up to 1947 and five more during the British Railways era from 1948 onwards. That does not mean that all 38 locomotives were painted in all these different styles; many were specific to just a few engines. The only style that all 38 bore was the British Railways lined Locomotive Green and the entire class was turned out thus between 1955 and 1958.

It was customary on all British mainline journeys to change engines at convenient locations to avoid the lengthy process of re-coaling. The Coronation locomotives were therefore strategically stationed at key points between London and Glasgow and they would be assigned to the shed at that location. The chosen locations were at London (Camden shed), Crewe (Crewe North), Carlisle (Upperby) and Glasgow (Polmadie). It was only in the latter days of steam that the mix of shed assignments became more fluid.

No. 6220 Coronation held the British steam speed record between 1937 and 1938, 114 miles per hour (183 km/h). It held that record until beaten by 4468 Mallard in 1938. Secondly, No. 6234 Duchess of Abercorn holds the record to this day for the greatest British power output to be officially recorded on an attached dynamometer car, achieved in 1939. The Coronation class was represented at the 1948 British Railways locomotive exchange trials, designed to compare the performances of similar locomotives from the four pre-nationalised companies, but they performed extremely poorly. After this, they were targeted for low coal consumption instead of extreme pulling power. One of the class was involved in the Harrow and Wealdstone rail crash precipitated by 46242 City of Glasgow. This was the second worst rail crash in British history, the death toll being 112.

After a successful decade of operations in the 1950s, the 1955 Modernisation Plan's increased use of diesel locomotives made many of the class redundant, and the electrification of the main line between London Euston and Crewe resulted in their removal from this important section of the main line as, at the time, it was thought that there was insufficient clearance between the locomotives and the overhead wires. (The locomotives have subsequently run 'under the wires' in perfect safety in preservation.) With no suitable work available, the survivors were scrapped from late 1962 to late 1964. Three locomotives were saved for preservation, with one of them ending up in the National Collection. As at October 2016, two are static in museums whilst the third is certified for main line service.

== Design history ==
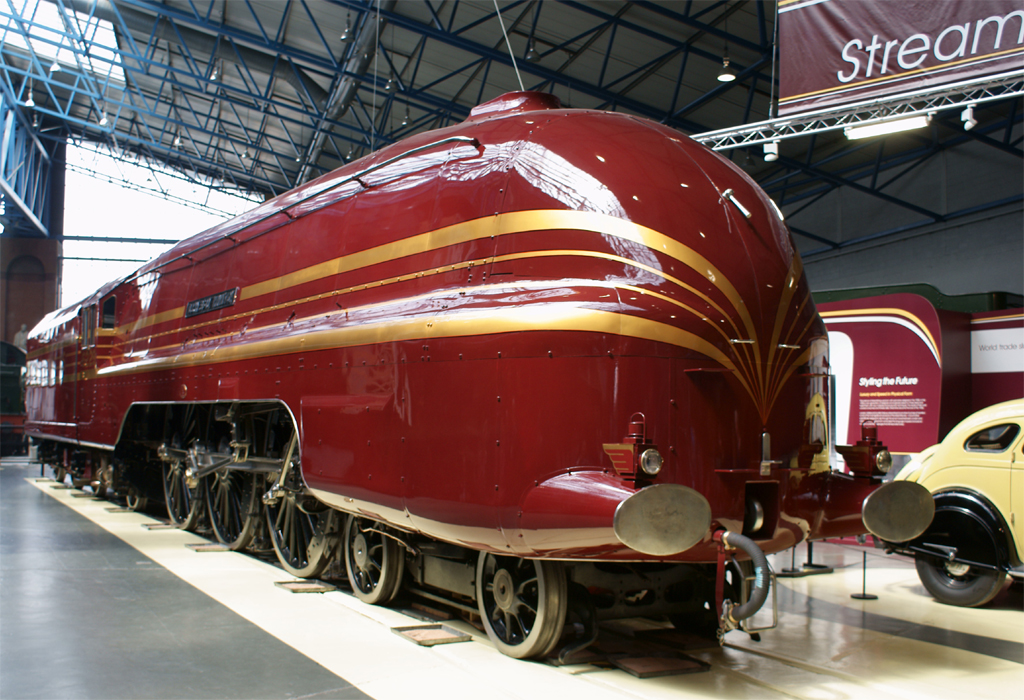
Streamlined version as originally built

Although the prior introduction of the Princess Royal class had provided the London Midland and Scottish Railway (LMS) with more powerful locomotives to be used on the main line between London Euston and Glasgow Central, the board of directors were persuaded in 1936 that more such locomotives would be needed, particularly as they were being asked to approve the introduction of a new non-stop service between those cities, designated the Coronation Scot. Initially, the Chief Mechanical Engineer, William Stanier, planned to build five more Princess Royals, but the Chief Technical Assistant and Chief Draughtsman at the LMS Derby Works, Tom Coleman, argued that it would be preferable to design a new class of locomotive that was more powerful, more reliable and easier to maintain. Stanier was convinced and the drawing office commenced designing the new class. When Stanier was called on to perform an assignment in India, Coleman became responsible for most of the detailed design in his absence.

Compared to the Princess Royal Class, there were important differences which would lead to an improved performance. Increased power was obtained by adopting a bigger boiler with greater steam-raising capacity; this included a firebox heating surface of 230 sq ft (21 m^{2}) versus 217 sq ft, a flue heating surface of 2,577 sq ft (239.4 m^{2}) versus 2,299 sq ft, superheater surface area of 830 sq ft (77 m^{2}) (some sources say 822 sq ft) versus 598 sq ft and a grate area of 50 sq ft (4.6 m^{2}) versus 45 sq ft. Also, the steam passages were better streamlined for greater efficiency and, most importantly, the piston valves went up in size from 8 inches to 9.5 inches. In order to allow higher speeds, the diameter of the driving wheels was increased to 6 ft 9 in (2.06 m) (from 6 ft 6 in) and the cylinder diameters were increased by 1/4 in (6.4 mm). The outside cylinders were moved forward with rocking shafts operating the inside cylinders. Finally a coal pusher was incorporated into the tender so the fireman did not have to "bring the coal forward", significantly cutting his workload which was particularly important on the long runs from Euston to Glasgow.

Just as the new design was approaching finalisation, the LMS marketing department created a difficult problem. The London and North Eastern Railway (LNER) had recently introduced its streamlined Class A4 locomotive which had captured the imagination of the public, and the marketing department persuaded the board that the LMS's new locomotives should be streamlined too. This was problematic in that the new design was so large that it only just conformed to the maximum loading gauge for the main line; moreover, it was sufficiently heavy that it was close to the Civil Engineer's maximum weight limit. Nevertheless, Coleman managed to design a streamlined steel casing that hugged the locomotive so tightly that it could still meet the loading gauge. The casing weighed some 5 long tons (5.6 short tons; 5.1 t), but Coleman managed to save an equivalent weight in the locomotive itself.

The casing was tested in a wind tunnel, and retained after it was found to be as good as other forms of streamlining. After introduction it was subsequently found that its aerodynamic form failed to disturb the air sufficiently to lift the exhaust from the chimney, thus obstructing the driver's vision with smoke.

== Construction history ==
=== Locomotives ===
The first five locomotives, Nos. 6220–6224, were built in 1937 at the LMS Crewe Works at an average cost of £11,641 each. They were all intended to haul the Coronation Scot, so the locomotives and the special trainsets bore a common livery. The locomotives were streamlined and painted Caledonian Railway blue with silver horizontal lines along each side of the locomotive. The special trainsets that they hauled were painted the same shade of blue and the silver lining was repeated along each side of the coaches.

In 1938 the second five locomotives of the class, Nos. 6225–6229 (named after Duchesses) were also built in streamlined form at an average cost of £11,323 each. They were painted in the same shade of crimson lake which had already been applied to the Princess Royal class; the same style of horizontal lining that had been a feature of the first five locomotives was continued, but in gilt. Although the crimson lake matched the standard LMS rolling stock, there was no attempt to apply the gilt lining along the sides of these coaches. A prototype trainset was built with such lining for exhibition in America, but it was never put into service due to the outbreak of the Second World War.

Stanier, the designer of the locomotives, felt that the added weight and difficulty in maintenance due to the streamlining was too high a price to pay for the actual benefits gained at high speed. Therefore, in 1938 a third batch of five locomotives (again named after Duchesses) was built, Nos. 6230–6234, without streamlining at an average cost of £10,659 each.

During 1939 and 1940, a fourth batch of ten locomotives (Nos. 6235–6244) was built in streamlined form commencing with No. 6235 City of Birmingham. The names of cities for the locomotives would seem to have been adopted because the LMS was fast running out of names of Duchesses. These locomotives cost an average of £10,659 for the first five and £10,838 each for the second five. The names of the cities in this batch were in strict alphabetical order. This came to an end when No. 6244 City of Leeds was patriotically renamed King George VI in 1941.

The fifth batch, again named after cities, comprised four locomotives, Nos. 6245–6248. These engines were built during 1943 and the average cost was held to £10,908 due to the incorporation of recycled boilers. During the Second World War, the Materials Committee of the government tried to balance the needs for steel between civilian departments and the War Department when allocating those resources. Despite these constraints, the entire batch was still outshopped in streamlined form.

The theme of cities continued into 1944 when another batch of four, Nos. 6249–6252, was built without streamlining. The cost of these locomotives averaged £11,664 each. A follow-up batch of three locomotives (Nos. 6253–6255) was built in 1946 and this batch attracted an inflationary average cost of £15,460 each. The problem of hanging smoke was addressed and smoke deflectors were now incorporated into the design.

The final two locomotives were constructed to the modified design of George Ivatt who succeeded both Stanier, following his retirement, and Stanier's immediate successor Charles Fairburn, who unexpectedly died in office. The first, No. 6256 built in 1947, was the last of the class to be built before nationalisation and it was therefore named in honour of its original designer Sir William A. Stanier, F.R.S.. The unveiling of the nameplate was performed by Stanier himself. In 1948, the privately owned railways were nationalised and incorporated into British Railways. It was within this new regime that No. 46257 was completed – in common with other LMS locomotives, 40000 had been added to the original numbers. The spiralling costs after the Second World War, combined with the design changes, resulted in the individual cost of these locomotives escalating to £21,411.

=== Tenders ===
==== Overview ====
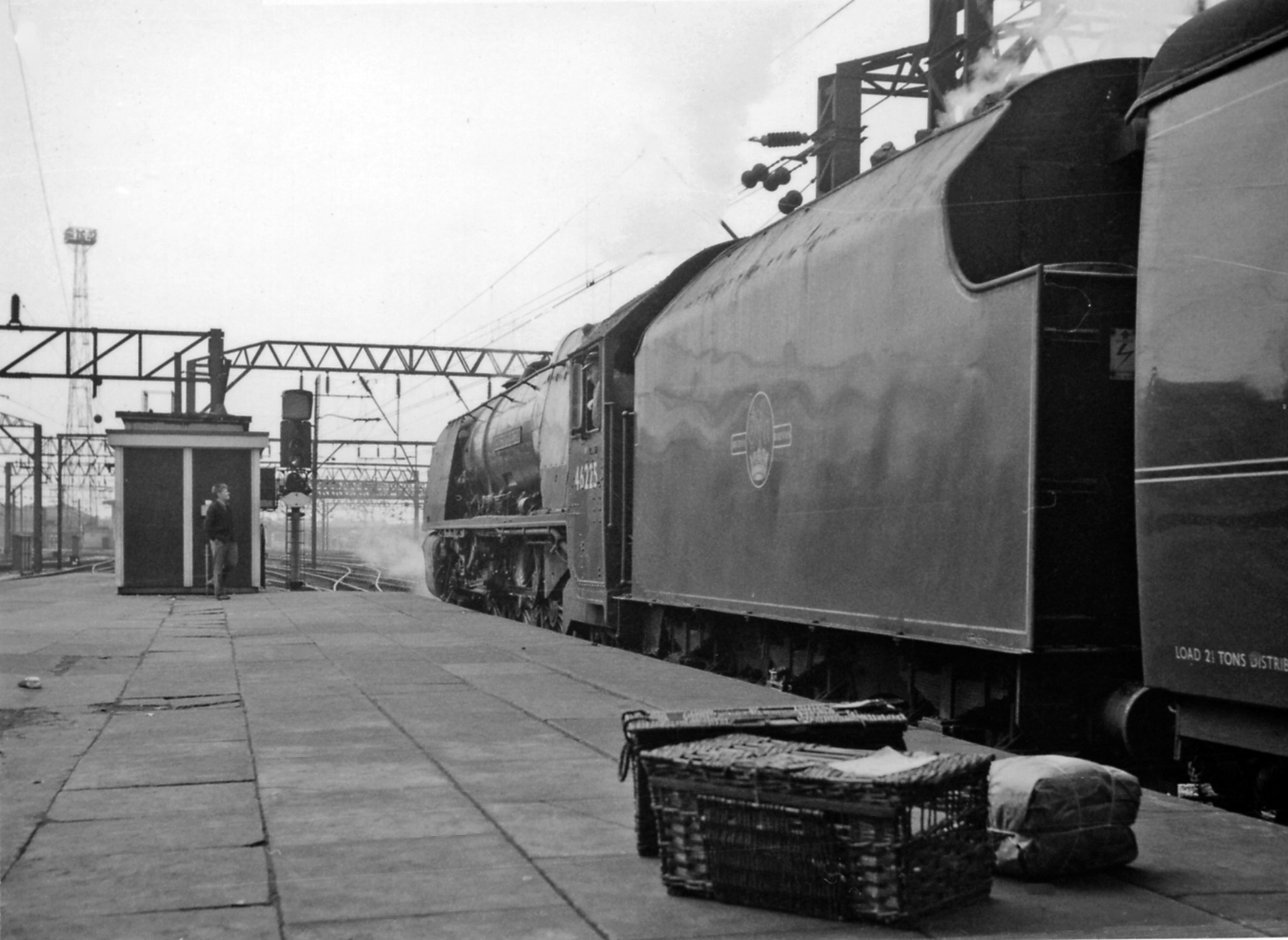
The lack of a handrail on the tender shows that this is an ex-streamlined Type A. The locomotive is No. 46225 Duchess of Gloucester photographed in 1961, so the table below shows that the tender is No. 9799.

The original tender design, which came to be known as Type 'A', was designed for the first ten streamlined locomotives. These were of welded tank construction and included side sheets extending from the rear of the tender, which had the effect of reducing drag from eddies between the tender and the leading coach. 28 of these were constructed to be coupled with all the 24 streamliners (Nos. 6220–6229 and Nos. 6235–6248) as well as four of the unstreamlined locomotives (Nos. 6249–6252). In practice, it would seem that the side sheets made it more difficult to access the water filler as well as the couplings.

A second, more traditional design followed for the initial batch of five unstreamlined locomotives (Nos. 6230–6234). Again they were of welded tank construction, but lacked any of the streamlining add-ons. Even without the streamlining Type 'B' tenders were distinguishable from Type 'A' by having a slightly different profile at the front and steps and handrails at the rear.

The third design, by George Ivatt, initially was Type 'C1' and it was paired with the three locomotives Nos. 6253–6255. It was partially riveted and resembled a Type 'A' at its front end and a Type 'B' at the rear. The design was quickly followed by Type 'C2', which differed from the 'C1' in that it had a lower front edge and was fitted with Timken roller bearings. Only two 'C2's were built and they were coupled to the last two of the class, Nos. 6256 and 46257.

Whilst nearly fifteen of the tenders remained wedded to their original locomotives, others received new partners – the very first tender to be manufactured swapped partners seven times. After the Second World War, when the streamlined tenders were de-streamlined, it was difficult to spot any mismatches. The most readily visible mismatches were those of locomotives Nos. 6249–6252 where pre-produced Type 'A' streamlined tenders were married to unstreamlined locomotives.

An unusual feature of all Coronation Class tenders was that they were fitted with a steam-operated coal pusher to bring the coal down to the firing plate. When this was in operation a plume of steam could be seen rising from the rear face of the coal bunker backwall. This equipment greatly helped the locomotive's fireman to meet the high demands for power during the non-stop run of 399 miles (642 km) between London Euston and Glasgow Central, when operating the Coronation Scot train.

==== Table of tender and locomotive pairings ====
All LMS tenders were given their own unique identity numbers and they tended to be constructed in advance of the locomotives they would be paired with. Hence, they were made in four batches, Nos. 9703–9709, 9743–9752, 9798–9817 and 10622-10624.

The following table lists the locomotives to which they were attached. Of note is the fact that locomotive No. 46221 had its tender (No.9816) withdrawn ahead of time in 1962; the locomotive was then paired to the Princess Royal tender No. 9359 until its withdrawal in May 1963.

Tender no.	Type	Original loco. & style	2nd loco.	3rd loco.	4th loco.	5th loco.	6th loco.	7th loco.	8th loco.	Withdrawn
9703	A	6220 (Jun 1937); Str.	6240 (1944); Str.	6220 (1944); Str.	6242 (1946); Str.	46253 (1951); Conv.	46242 (1951); Semi	46241 (1956); Semi	46242 (1956); Conv.	Oct 1963
9704	A	6221 (Jun 1937); Str.	46253 (1961); Conv.							Jan 1963
9705	A	6222 (Jun 1937); Str.	46220 (1949); Semi.							Apr 1963
9706	A	6223 (Jul 1937); Str.	6224 (1946); Str.							Oct 1963
9707	A	6224 (Jul 1937); Str.	6230 (1945); Conv.							Nov 1963
9743	A	6225 (May 1938); Str.	6249 (1945); Conv.							Nov 1963
9744	A	6226 (May 1938); Str.								Oct 1964
9745	A	6227 (Jun 1938); Str.								Dec 1962
9746	A	6228 (Jun 1938); Str.								Oct 1964
9747	A	6229 (Sep 1938); Str.	6239 (1945); Str.							Oct 1964
9748	B	6230 (Jul 1938); Conv.	6224 (1945); Str.	6223 (1946); Semi						Oct 1963
9749	B	6231 (Jul 1938); Conv.	6249 (1945); Conv.	6225 (1945); Str.	46236 (1949); Semi	46247 (1952); Semi	46246 (1961); Conv.			Jan 1963
9750	B	6232 (Jul 1938); Conv.								Dec 1962
9751	B	6233 (Jul 1938); Conv.								Feb 1964
9752	B	6234 (Aug 1938); Conv.								Jan 1963
9798	A	6235 (Jul 1939); Str.								Oct 1964
9799	A	6236 (Jul 1939); Str.	46225 (1949); Semi							Oct 1964
9800	A	6237 (Aug 1939); Str.	6242 (1944); Str.	6237 (1944); Str.						Oct 1964
9801	A	6238 (Sep 1939); Str.								Oct 1964
9802	A	6239 (Sep 1939); Str.	6229 (1945); Str.							Feb 1964
9803	A	6240 (Mar 1940); Str.	6220 (1944); Str.	6240 (1944); Str.						Oct 1964
9804	A	6241 (Apr 1940); Str.	6242 (1944); Str.	6241 (1944); Str.	6220 (1946); Str.	46222 (1949); Semi.				Oct 1963
9805	A	6242 (May 1940); Str.	6241 (1944); Str.	46245 (1953); Semi						Oct 1964
9806	A	6243 (Jun 1940); Str.								Oct 1964
9807	A	6244 (Jul 1940); Str.	6245 (1945); Str.	46247 (1952); Semi	46236 (1952); Semi					Mar 1964
9808	A	6245 (Jul 1943); Str.	6244 (1945); Str.							Oct 1964
9809	A	6246 (Aug 1943); Str.	46247 (1961); Conv.							Jun 1963
9810	A	6247 (Sep 1943); Str.	6248 (1944); Str.							Sep 1964
9811	A	6248 (Oct 1943); Str.	6247 (1944); Str.	46245 (1952); Semi	46241 (1953); Semi	46242 (1956); Conv.	46241 (1956); Semi			Sep 1964
9812	A	6249 (Apr 1944); Conv.	6231 (1945); Conv.							Dec 1962
9813	A	6250 (May 1944); Conv.								Oct 1964
9814	A	6251 (Jun 1944); Conv.								Oct 1964
9815	A	6252 (Jul 1944); Conv.								Jun 1963
9816	C1	6253 (Sep 1946); Conv.	46253 (1951); Conv.	46242 (1951); Semi	46253 (1955); Conv.	46221 (1961); Conv.				1962
9817	C1	6254 (Sep 1946); Conv.								Oct 1964
10622	C1	6255 (Oct 1946); Conv.								Oct 1964
10623	C2	6256 (Dec 1947); Ivatt								Oct 1964
10624	C2	46257 (May 1948); Ivatt								Oct 1964

=== Modifications ===
==== Double chimneys ====
Single chimneys were fitted to Nos. 6220–6234 when built. Following a successful trial using No. 6234 Duchess of Abercorn on 26 February 1939, these were replaced with double blastpipes and chimneys between 1939 and 1944, the last being No. 6220 Coronation. From No. 6235 onwards, all the locomotives were built with double blastpipes and chimneys.

==== Smoke deflectors ====
Following a report by George Ivatt in 1945, smoke deflectors were introduced due to drifting smoke obscuring the crew's forward vision. The first locomotive to be fitted with smoke deflectors from the outset was No. 6253 City of St. Albans in September 1946. All the following four locomotives included this feature. The first unstreamlined locomotive to be retrofitted was No. 6232 Duchess of Montrose in February 1945.

==== Removal of streamlining ====
George Ivatt's 1945 report also recommended the removal of all streamlining casings and they were removed from the fitted locomotives from 1946 onwards. It had been found to be of little value at speeds below 90 mph (140 km/h), and was unpopular with running shed employees as it caused difficulty of access for maintenance. The first step towards de-streamlining was carried out during the Second World War when many of the streamlined tenders had their side sheets cut away at the rear of the tender. Many photographs exist showing this measure. The removal of the streamlining proper commenced in April 1946 with No. 6235 City of Birmingham. All de-streamlining coincided with the fitting of smoke deflectors. No. 6243 City of Lancaster was renumbered as 46243 in April 1948 and, as it was not de-streamlined until May 1949, it became the only locomotive to carry its British Railways number while streamlined.

Initially, locomotives that had previously been streamlined could be readily recognised by the sloping top to the front of their smokeboxes, as well as slightly smaller front-facing cab windows. These locomotives were affectionately referred to as 'semis'. In due course all were re-equipped with cylindrical smokeboxes and larger cab windows, often, but not necessarily, at the same time.The first locomotive to receive a cylindrical smokebox was No. 6226 Duchess of Norfolk in October 1952. The last one to retain the sloping top was 46246 City of Manchester which appeared with its new smokebox in May 1960.

Even following the conversion to cylindrical smokeboxes, it was still possible to distinguish some non-streamliners from ex-streamliners. On the former (Nos. 46230-46234 and 46249-46252, but not 46253-46257) the running plates veered downwards at right angles to connect with the buffer beam in the style of the Princess Royal Class. The ex-streamliners did not have any such connection, except No.46242 City of Glasgow which was rebuilt in 1952 following a serious collision.

==== The final locomotives ====
The final two locomotives Nos. 6256 and 46257 Sir William A. Stanier, F.R.S and City of Salford were given many new features. In order to raise the mileage between general overhauls from 70,000 to 100,000, measures were taken to decrease wear to the axle bearings and hornguides through the use of roller bearings and manganese steel linings. Other modifications included further superheating area, a redesigned rear frame and cast steel trailing truck, rocking grate, hopper ashpan and redesigned cab-sides.

==== Automatic warning system ====
During the twentieth century, signals passed at danger (SPADs) were increasingly perceived as a significant danger to the public. Only the Great Western Railway truly accepted the challenge posed. Prior even to 1910, it commenced installing Automatic Train Control (ATC), a system where each distant signal was accompanied by a ramp between the tracks with which a shoe on the locomotive would make contact as it passed over it. When the signal denoted "clear", an electric current would pass through the ramp which was detected by the shoe, thereby sounding a bell in the cab. With the signal at danger, the electric current would be cut off and when the shoe detected this it would activate a warning horn. In later forms, the brakes would be applied should the driver fail to acknowledge the warning.

In 1952, the UK's most disastrous SPAD ever occurred at Harrow and Wealdstone, in which No. 46242 City of Glasgow was severely damaged. The lack of an ATC system on most of Britain's railways was at last seen as an urgent issue. From 1956 the BR-designed Automatic Warning System (AWS) was installed. It was similar to ATC but relied on an induced magnetic field rather than an electric current and featured a visual indicator in the cab. The receiving system was installed on the Coronation class locomotives from 1959 onwards. The outward evidence of on-board AWS comprised a protective shield behind the front screw coupling, a box to house the necessary batteries immediately in front of the cab on the right-hand side and a cylindrical vacuum reservoir above the right-hand running plate.

== Table of Locomotives ==
The following table lists the chronology of major events for the entire class. De-streamlining took several weeks, so the date for modifications has been taken as the date when the locomotive was returned to service. Entries listed as "Current" are valid as at December 2016.

LMS No.	BR No.	Name	Into service	Style	Dbl. Ch'mn.	Casing Remvd.	Smoke Defl.	Cylind. S'box	Withdrawn	Notes
6220	46220	Coronation	Jun 1937	Str.	Dec 1944	Nov 1946	Nov 1946	Mar 1957	Apr 1963	1937:Set speed record of 114 mph (183 km/h). 1944: Last locomotive to receive double chimney as retrofit
6221	46221	Queen Elizabeth	Jun 1937	Str.	Nov 1940	Jun 1946	Jun 1946	Apr 1954	May 1963	
6222	46222	Queen Mary	Jun 1937	Str.	Aug 1943	Jul 1946	Jul 1946	Aug 1953	Oct 1963	
6223	46223	Princess Alice	Jul 1937	Str.	Nov 1941	Aug 1946	Aug 1946	Aug 1955	Oct 1963	
6224	46224	Princess Alexandra	Jul 1937	Str.	May 1940	Jun 1946	Jun 1946	Oct 1954	Oct 1963	1940: Involved in firebox collapse at Craigenhill. 1948: Involved in similar incident at Lamington
6225	46225	Duchess of Gloucester	May 1938	Str.	Jun 1943	Mar 1947	Mar 1947	Jan 1955	Oct 1964	1955: The locomotive spent several weeks at the Rugby Test Station for evaluation
6226	46226	Duchess of Norfolk	May 1938	Str.	Jul 1942	Jun 1947	Jun 1947	Oct 1952	Oct 1964	
6227	46227	Duchess of Devonshire	Jun 1938	Str.	Dec 1940	Aug 1946	Aug 1946	May 1953	Dec 1962	
6228	46228	Duchess of Rutland	Jun 1938	Str.	Sep 1940	Oct 1947	Oct 1947	Dec 1953	Oct 1964	
6229	46229	Duchess of Hamilton	Sep 1938	Str.	Apr 1943	Jan 1948	Jan 1948	Feb 1957	Feb 1964	2009–Current: Converted at Tyseley Locomotive Works into original, streamlined form for preserved static display at National Railway Museum. In 1939, 6229 was shipped to the US bearing the number and nameplates of No 6220 Coronation. It was returned in 1942 and its identity was restored in 1943.
6230	46230	Duchess of Buccleuch	Jun 1938	Conv.	Oct 1940	—	Sep 1946	—	Nov 1963	
6231	46231	Duchess of Atholl	Jun 1938	Conv.	Jun 1940	—	Sep 1946	—	Dec 1962	1945: Involved in collision at Ecclefechan
6232	46232	Duchess of Montrose	Jul 1938	Conv.	Jan 1943	—	Feb 1945	—	Dec 1962	
6233	46233	Duchess of Sutherland	Jul 1938	Conv.	Mar 1941	—	Aug 1946	—	Feb 1964	2001–Current: Preserved and operational, mainline certified
6234	46234	Duchess of Abercorn	Aug 1938	Conv.	Feb 1939	—	Mar 1946	—	Jan 1963	1939: Set all time power output record at the drawbar for a British steam locomotive of 2,511 hp (1,872 kW)
6235	46235	City of Birmingham	Jul 1939	Str.	New	Apr 1946	Apr 1946	Sep 1956	Oct 1964	2001–Current: Preserved as a static exhibit at ThinkTank in Birmingham
6236	46236	City of Bradford	Jul 1939	Str	New	Mar 1948	Mar 1948	Nov 1953	Mar 1964	1948: Took part in the BR Locomotive Exchange Trials
6237	46237	City of Bristol	Aug 1939	Str.	New	Mar 1947	Mar 1947	Mar 1953	Oct 1964	1955: Temporarily loaned to Western Region
6238	46238	City of Carlisle	Sep 1939	Str.	New	Jan 1947	Jan 1947	Oct 1953	Oct 1964	1962: Involved in firebox collapse at Bletchley
6239	46239	City of Chester	Sep 1939	Str.	New	Sep 1947	Sep 1947	May 1953	Oct 1964	
6240	46240	City of Coventry	Mar 1940	Str.	New	Jul 1947	Jul 1947	Jul 1953	Oct 1964	Current: The nameplate and numberplate survive at Coventry Station and can be seen from the staircase above platform 2 and 3
6241	46241	City of Edinburgh	Apr 1940	Str.	New	Feb 1947	Feb 1947	Feb 1958	Sep 1964	
6242	46242	City of Glasgow	May 1940	Str.	New	May 1947	May 1947	Nov 1953	Oct 1963	1952: Badly damaged in the Harrow and Wealdstone collision. Rebuilt with non-streamlined style front footplate, which had been removed from another victim of the same accident, number 46202
6243	46243	City of Lancaster	Jun 1940	Str.	New	Jul 1949	Jul 1949	Nov 1958	Oct 1964	1949: Last streamlined locomotive to have its casings removed
6244	46244	City of Leeds (to Apr 1941); King George VI	Jul 1940	Str.	New	Oct 1947	Oct 1947	Jul 1953	Oct 1964	1947: Involved in derailment at Polesworth
6245	46245	City of London	Jun 1943	Str.	New	Oct 1947	Oct 1947	Nov 1956	Oct 1964	
6246	46246	City of Manchester	Aug 1943	Str.	New	Oct 1946	Oct 1946	May 1960	Jan 1963	1960: Last 'semi' to receive a cylindrical smokebox
6247	46247	City of Liverpool	Sep 1943	Str.	New	Jun 1947	Jun 1947	Sep 1956	Jun 1963	
6248	46248	City of Leeds	Oct 1943	Str.	New	Dec 1946	Dec 1946	Mar 1957	Sep 1964	
6249	46249	City of Sheffield	Apr 1944	Conv.	New	—	Nov 1946	—	Nov 1963	1944: Built with streamlined tender 1945: Presented with stainless steel nameplates
6250	46250	City of Lichfield	May 1944	Conv.	New	—	Mar 1946	—	Oct 1964	1944: Built with streamlined tender. 1954: Involved in derailment at Watford
6251	46251	City of Nottingham	Jun 1944	Conv.	New	—	Aug 1946	—	Oct 1964	1944: Built with streamlined tender. 1948: Damaged in the collision at Winsford.
6252	46252	City of Leicester	Jun 1944	Conv.	New	—	Mar 1945	—	Jun 1963	1944: Built with streamlined tender
6253	46253	City of St. Albans	Sep 1946	Conv.	New	—	New	—	Jan 1963	
6254	46254	City of Stoke-on-Trent	Sep 1946	Conv.	New	—	New	—	Oct 1964	1956: Temporarily loaned to Western Region
6255	46255	City of Hereford	Oct 1946	Conv.	New	—	New	—	Oct 1964	
6256	46256	Sir William A. Stanier, F.R.S.	Dec 1947	Conv.	New	—	New	—	Oct 1964	1947: Design modified by Ivatt
Built post LMS	46257	City of Salford	May 1948	Conv.	New	—	New	—	Oct 1964	1947: Design modified by Ivatt. 1956: Temporarily loaned to Western Region

== Liveries ==
=== The LMS era ===
==== Pre-1942 ====
Before applying the top coats of paint, the LMS would apply a matt undercoat of shop grey. The first non-streamlined loco was fitted with mock-up nameplates and numbers for each of the first batch of locos which was then photographed to mimic each individual loco. Those temporary nameplates are now in the NRM's collection in York. The ensuing LMS top coats for the Coronation Class came in two basic colours during this period: Caledonian blue and crimson lake. Linings for streamliners involved the renowned 'speed whiskers' comprising stripes emerging from a fixed point in the lower centre of the front of the locomotive to run in parallel along the sides. Non-streamliners carried the standard LMS-style lining.

The first five locomotives, Nos. 6220–6224, were painted in Caledonian blue livery with banding in silver-coloured aluminium paint. Wheels, lining to the edges of the bands, and the background to the chromium-plated nameplates were painted in a darker blue, Navy or Prussian blue.

The second and fourth batches of streamlined locomotives, Nos. 6225–6229 and 6235–6244, were painted in crimson lake livery, with banding in gold lined with vermilion and black. Nameplates had a black background. LMS shop grey was carried briefly in service on No. 6229 Duchess of Hamilton from 7 September 1938 until its return to Crewe Works later that year. It was then painted crimson lake and disguised as No. 6220, in preparation for the 1939 visit to the New York World's Fair. Lettering and numerals for both Caledonian blue and crimson lake liveries were in a newly created style of unshaded sans-serif.

The non-streamlined Nos. 6230–6234 were painted in a special version of the standard crimson lake livery. The locomotives were lined out in gold bordered with fine red lines. Serif lettering and numerals in gold leaf and vermillion shading were applied. Handrails and sundry small external fittings were chrome-plated, as were the nameplates, which had a black background.

Two unusual events have been recorded. Firstly, in 1940 No. 6221 Queen Elizabeth had its Caledonian blue colour scheme replaced by the crimson lake, the only such instance. Secondly, it was often speculated that at some time in the two-year history of the Coronation Scot a crimson streamliner might have hauled the blue trainset. Such an event has, probably uniquely, been captured on film.

==== Post-1942 ====
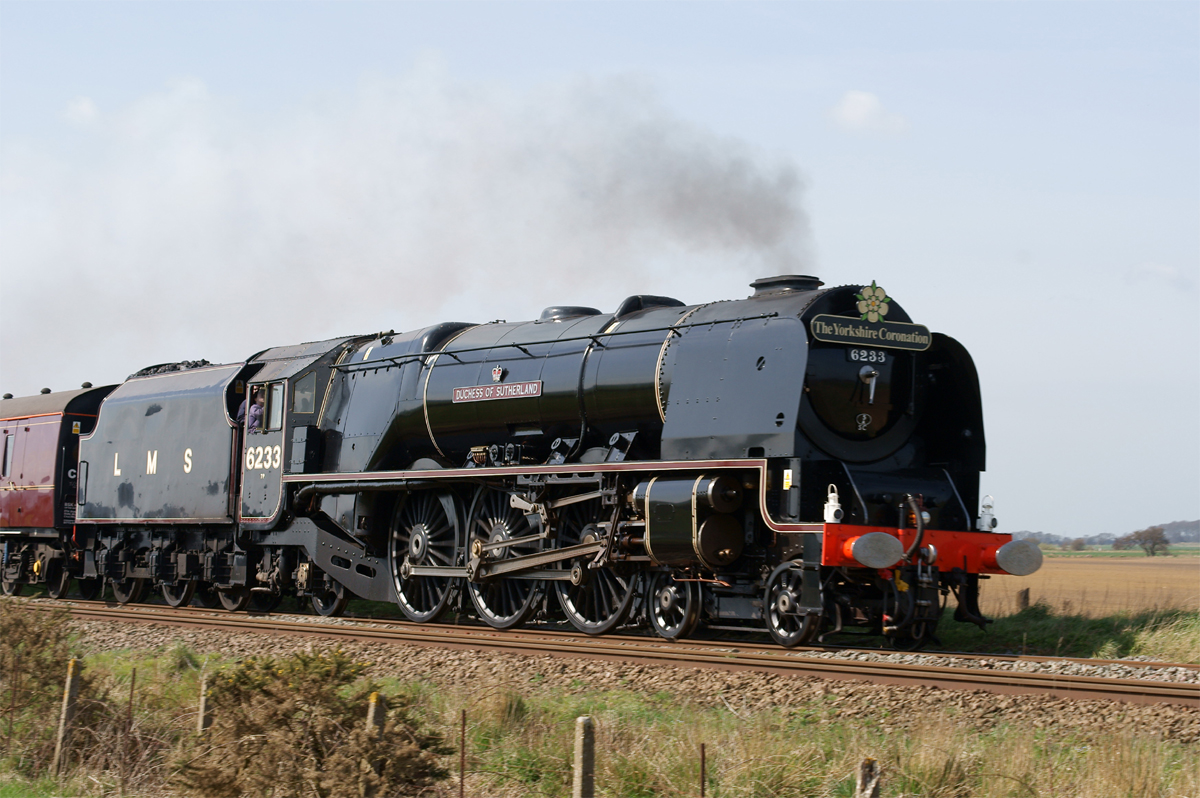
No. 6233 Duchess of Sutherland in preservation turned out in LMS Black.

Black was the overriding colour for this period, with one exception. Streamlined locomotives Nos. 6245–6248 were outshopped at Crewe in 1943 painted plain black. The following two batches, Nos. 6249–6255, constructed without streamlining, were also painted unlined black; the lettering and numerals on all these locomotives was in serif style coloured yellow with red shading. From 1946 onwards de-streamlined locomotives were mostly repainted in black with LMS-style lining. The lining comprised a broad maroon centre with fine straw yellow edging. Lettering and numbers were in a sans-serif Grotesque font, coloured yellow with an inner maroon line. By the end of 1947, 29 of the 37 locomotives were painted thus.

The one exception to black was No. 6234 Duchess of Abercorn which in 1946 was painted in a blue-grey colour. This represented the proposed post-war livery and the lining, painted on one side of the locomotive only, comprised a pale straw yellow line along the running plate with yellow and black edging to cab and tender. Lettering and numerals used a sans-serif font.

==== Table of LMS liveries ====
The following table lists the liveries carried by the Coronation class between June 1937 and December 1947. The blue-grey livery has never been authenticated in a colour photograph.

LMS No.	Name	Cal'n blue	Shop grey	Crmsn lake	Crmsn lake	Plain black	Lined black	Blue-grey
6220	Coronation	Jun 1937				Mar 1944	Nov 1946	
6221	Queen Elizabeth	Jun 1937		Nov 1940		Jun 1946		
6222	Queen Mary	Jun 1937				Aug 1944	May 1946	
6223	Princess Alice	Jun 1937				Jan 1944	Aug 1946	
6224	Princess Alexandra	Jul 1937				Aug 1944	Jun 1946	
6225	Duchess of Gloucester			May 1938		Aug 1944	Mar 1947	
6226	Duchess of Norfolk			May 1938		May 1944		
6227	Duchess of Devonshire			Jun 1938		Dec 1943	Aug 1946	
6228	Duchess of Rutland			Jun 1938		May 1944	Oct 1947	
6229	Duchess of Hamilton		Sep 1938	Dec 1938		Nov 1944		
6230	Duchess of Buccleuch				Jun 1938		Sep 1946	
6231	Duchess of Atholl				Jun 1938	May 1945	Aug 1946	
6232	Duchess of Montrose				Jul 1938			
6233	Duchess of Sutherland				Jul 1938		Oct 1947	
6234	Duchess of Abercorn				Aug 1938			Mar 1946
6235	City of Birmingham			Jun 1939		Jul 1944	Jan 1947	
6236	City of Bradford			Jul 1939		Apr 1944		
6237	City of Bristol			Aug 1939		Aug 1944	Mar 1947	
6238	City of Carlisle			Sep 1939		Jul 1944	Jan 1947	
6239	City of Chester			Sep 1939		Jul 1944	Mar 1947	
6240	City of Coventry			Mar 1940		Dec 1944	Jul 1947	
6241	City of Edinburgh			Apr 1940		Oct 1944	Feb 1947	
6242	City of Glasgow			May 1940			May 1947	
6243	City of Lancaster			May 1940		Dec 1943		
6244	City of Leeds (to 1941); King George VI			Jul 1940		Jan 1944	Sep 1944	
6245	City of London					Jun 1943	Oct 1947	
6246	City of Manchester					Aug 1943	Oct 1946	
6247	City of Liverpool					Sep 1943	Jun 1947	
6248	City of Leeds					Oct 1943	Dec 1946	
6249	City of Sheffield					Apr 1944	Nov 1947	
6250	City of Lichfield					May 1944	Sep 1947	
6251	City of Nottingham					Jun 1944	Aug 1947	
6252	City of Leicester					Jun 1944		
6253	City of St. Albans						Sep 1946	
6254	City of Stoke-on-Trent						Sep 1946	
6255	City of Hereford						Oct 1946	
6256	Sir William A. Stanier, F.R.S.						Dec 1947	

=== The British Railways era ===
==== Pre-1951 ====
Early in 1948, before the new liveries for the whole of British Railways had been decided upon, Nos. 46229, 46232 and 46236 were repainted LMS-style lined black (crimson and straw lining) and No. 46257 was similarly turned out when constructed in July. Throughout 1948 and 1949 the English locomotives (now under the control of the London Midland Region of British Railways) were relined in an experimental BR lined black, which used LNWR-style red, cream and grey lining (similar to that adopted for Mixed Traffic locos), and 'BRITISH RAILWAYS' in Gill Sans on the tender. The Scottish locomotives based at Glasgow's Polmadie shed, which were under the control of the Scottish Region, were destined for a brighter future. Commencing in May 1948, seven of the class were called in to be painted in "experimental blue". This livery was a somewhat darker shade than that adopted as the standard express livery the following year, being more similar to the former GER blue, and lined out in the LNWR style lining with 'BRITISH RAILWAYS' in Gill Sans on the tender. So sudden was the adoption of this blue livery that No. 46232, fresh in LMS-style lined black following its heavy general repair, was called back after a mere four days to be repainted blue. Around this time BR was also experimenting with various shades of green on the other regions.

The Polmadie experiment was upheld by British Railways in 1949 when the somewhat brighter BR standard blue was selected for all its large passenger locomotives, despite the fact that the Great Western Railway (GWR), the Southern Railway (SR) and the London & North Eastern Railway (LNER) had overwhelmingly painted their locomotives green (the LMS by contrast concentrating on crimson lake). Blue was subsequently carried by 27 of the 38 Coronation Class locomotives. The first two to be so painted, Nos. 46242 and 46243 were outshopped in the new colour when they received their heavy general repairs in May 1949. The blue livery, which was subsequently phased out, lasted until September 1955.

British Railways undertook a massive programme to establish itself by repainting all its locomotives with their new BR numbers and replacing their previous corporate identity with its own. Gone were the tenders proclaiming the railway companies' logos, emblems and even coats of arms, to be replaced by the stark BRITISH RAILWAYS lettering. The enormity of this task meant that the necessary repainting was not necessarily carried out to coincide with an overall repaint. For the Coronation Class, all locomotives had been through this process by the end of 1948 except for Nos. 6223, 6238, 6248, 6250, and 6252–6255, a total of 29 locomotives. Only thirteen locomotives out of the 29 received new liveries to accompany their renumbering.

Subsequently, in 1949 a crest was designed to replace the spartan BRITISH RAILWAYS logo. In turn, this would be replaced in 1956 by yet another design of crest.

==== Post-1951 ====
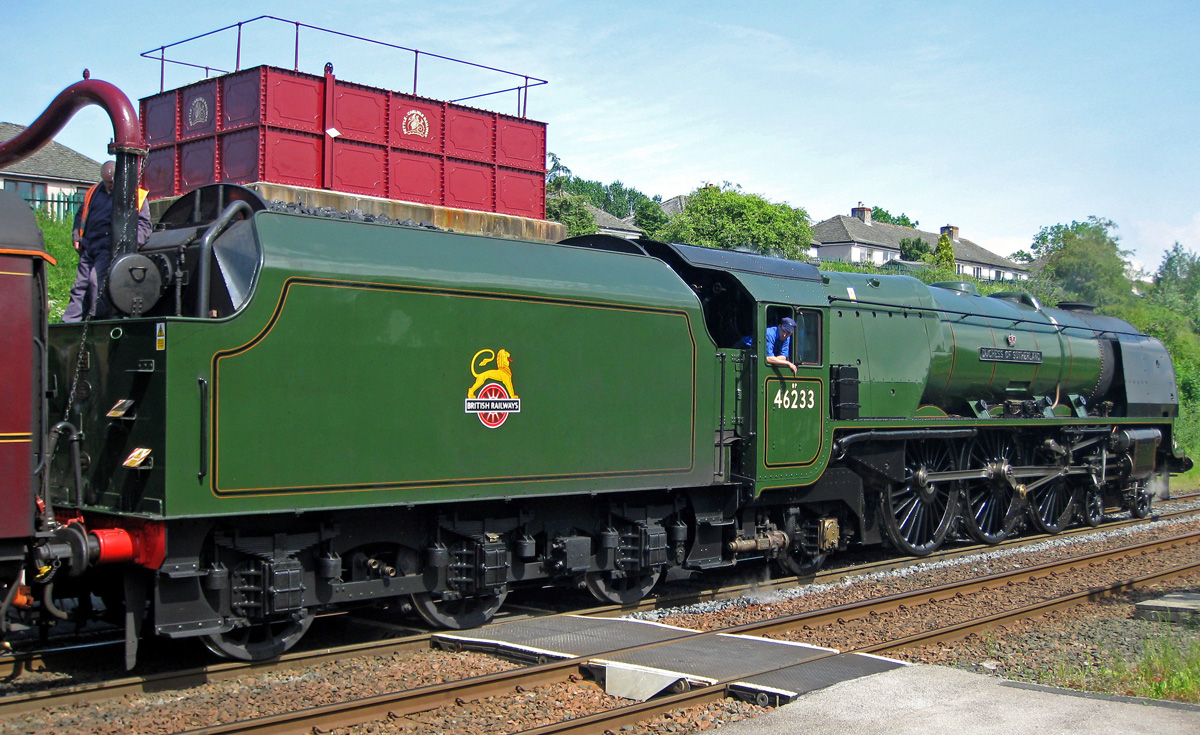
Preserved No. 46233 Duchess of Sutherland hauls a steam special gleaming in its BR "passenger" Brunswick Green.

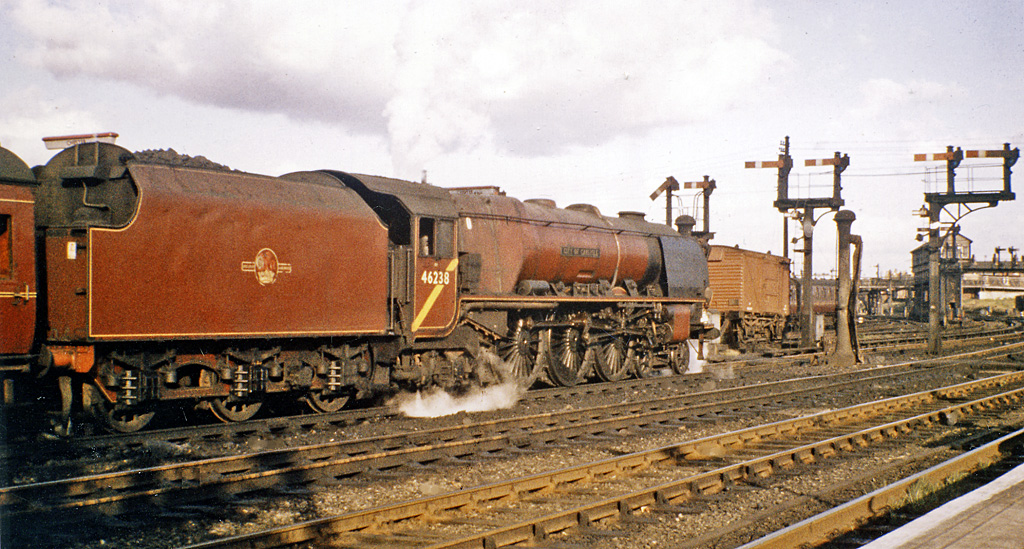
In 1964, No. 46238 City of Carlisle shows off its coat of LMR Maroon. It also sports a yellow 'line prohibition' stripe.

The decision to adopt blue as the standard colour was subsequently reversed and Locomotive green was introduced in November 1951 with No. 46232 Duchess of Montrose. Between October 1955 and December 1957, all 38 locomotives carried it concurrently, the only livery the entire class carried.

In the late 1950s the decision was made that the London Midland Region's main line locomotives could carry the colour maroon. This permission did not extend to the Scottish Region whose locomotives remained green until withdrawal.

The LMR maroon was carried on 16 locomotives from the late 1950s: Nos. 46225-6, 46228-9, 46236, 46238, 46240, 46243-48, 46251, 46254 and 46256. No. 46245 was the first, in December 1957; a further fifteen examples followed between May and November 1958. The style of lining varied: the first six repaints into maroon (including No. 46245) were lined out in the LMS style; the last ten received the BR style of lining as used on the standard green livery; No. 46247, originally lined in the LMS style, was given the BR style in July 1959; and by November 1961 those with the BR lining were repainted to match No. 46245.

Because of insufficient clearance between the locomotives and the 25 kV overhead electric wires south of Crewe, the whole class was banned from operating under them with effect from 1 September 1964. To highlight this prohibition a yellow diagonal stripe was painted on the cab sides. This inability of the locomotives to operate on the line for which they were designed was crucial in the decision to withdraw the entire class.

==== Table of BR liveries ====
The table below lists the various liveries applied to the locomotives from 1 January 1948. Repaints in the same livery are not included.

BR No.	Name	Livery at 1 January 1948	LMS lined black	BR lined black	BR exp. dark blue	BR lined blue	Plain black	BR lined green	BR lined maroon	LMS lined maroon
46220	Coronation					Jan 1950		Feb 1952		
46221	Queen Elizabeth					Mar 1950		Dec 1952		
46222	Queen Mary					Oct 1950		Aug 1953		
46223	Princess Alice					Apr 1950		Oct 1952		
46224	Princess Alexandra				Aug 1948	Aug 1950		Feb 1952		
46225	Duchess of Gloucester					Mar 1950		Jan 1955	Aug 1958	Jan 1960
46226	Duchess of Norfolk			Sep 1948		Jan 1951		May 1954	Nov 1958	Jan 1960
46227	Duchess of Devonshire				Jun 1948	Aug 1950		Apr 1953		
46228	Duchess of Rutland					Aug 1950		Jun 1955		Jun 1958
46229	Duchess of Hamilton		Jan 1948			Feb 1950		Apr 1952	Sep 1958	Oct 1959
46230	Duchess of Buccleuch				May 1948			May 1952		
46231	Duchess of Atholl				May 1948	Jan 1951		Dec 1953		
46232	Duchess of Montrose		May 1948		May 1948			Nov 1951		
46233	Duchess of Sutherland					May 1950		Nov 1952		
46234	Duchess of Abercorn			Oct 1948				Mar 1952		
46235	City of Birmingham					Dec 1950		May 1953		
46236	City of Bradford		Feb 1948				Aug 1952	Nov 1954	Jul 1958	Nov 1959
46237	City of Bristol					Sep 1949		Mar 1955		
46238	City of Carlisle			Mar 1949				Feb 1952		Jun 1958
46239	City of Chester					Jul 1950		Aug 1954		
46240	City of Coventry					Jan 1950		Oct 1954	Jul 1958	Aug 1960
46241	City of Edinburgh				Jun 1948	Sep 1949		Jun 1953		
46242	City of Glasgow					Jul 1949		Oct 1953		
46243	City of Lancaster					Jun 1949		Feb 1954	Oct 1958	Dec 1959
46244	King George VI				Aug 1948	Oct 1950		Jul 1953	Oct 1958	Jun 1960
46245	City of London							Apr 1953		Dec 1957
46246	City of Manchester			Nov 1948				Jun 1953	Oct 1958	Apr 1960
46247	City of Liverpool							Feb 1954	Jul 1959	May 1958; Jan 1961
46248	City of Leeds			Mar 1949				Oct 1953		Jun 1958
46249	City of Sheffield					Sep 1950		Oct 1954		
46250	City of Lichfield					May 1950		Oct 1952		
46251	City of Nottingham			May 1950				Feb 1955	Nov 1958	Nov 1960
46252	City of Leicester			Apr 1949				Jan 1952		
46253	City of St. Albans							Nov 1953		
46254	City of Stoke-on-Trent					Sep 1950		Oct 1955	Sep 1958	Jun 1960
46255	City of Hereford					Aug 1950		Jan 1953		
46256	Sir William A. Stanier, F.R.S.			Oct 1948		May 1951		Jun 1954		May 1958
46257	City of Salford	Built post LMS	May 1948					Dec 1952		

== Shed allocations ==
=== Overview ===
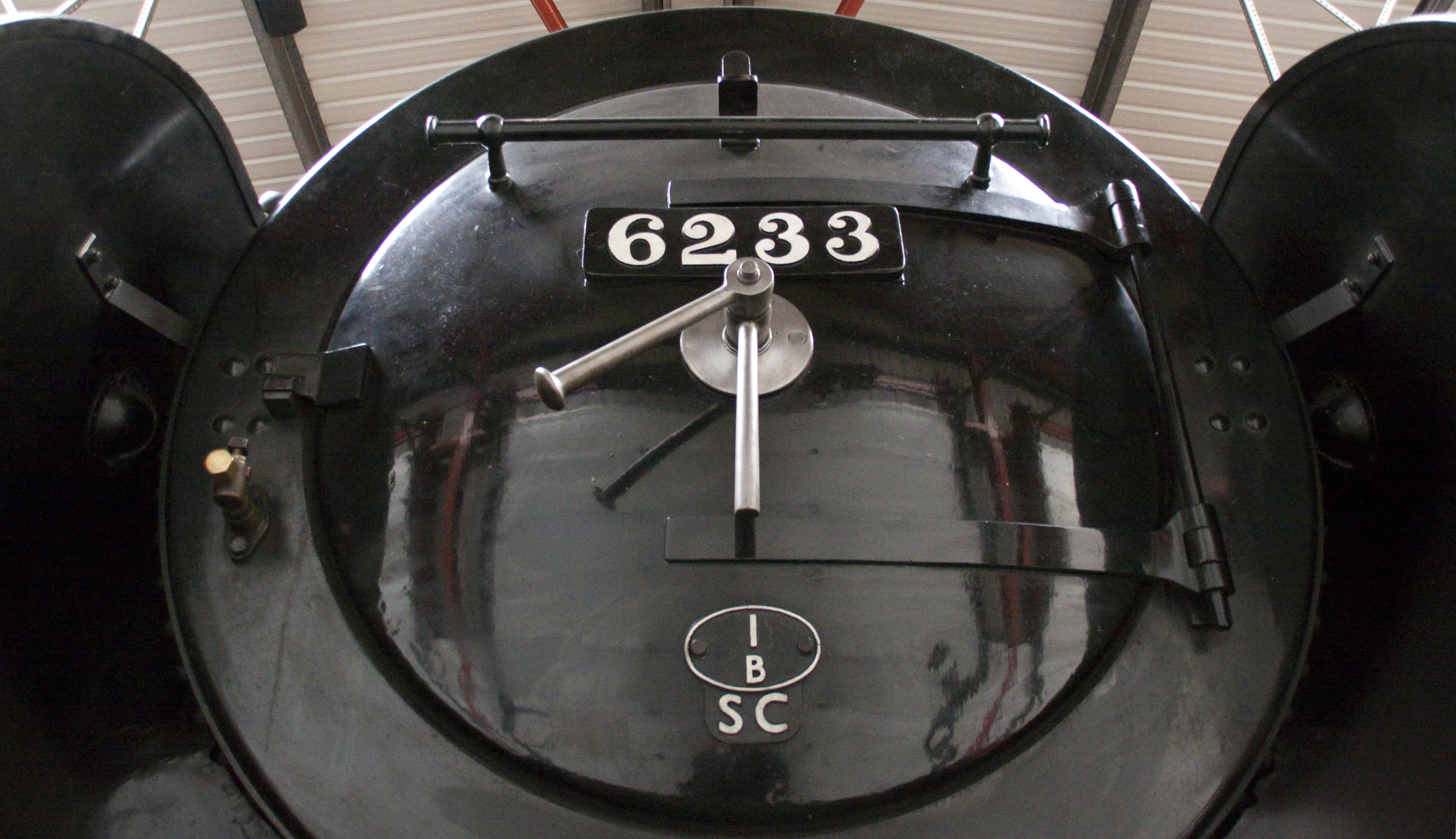
The LMS's code for a locomotive's shed was displayed on an oval plate on the smokebox door. The code "1B", above, relates to Camden shed.

Initially all the locomotives were allocated to Camden shed in London (LMS designation 1B). By 1939 there were nineteen officially stationed there. This came to an abrupt end when war was declared in September of that year, as the Government had decreed that in such an event all Britain's largest locomotives would be mothballed for the duration. Consequently, seven of the class were immediately dispatched to either Holyhead or to Rugby (via Manchester Longsight). Within weeks the stupidity of this policy was realised and the locomotives were returned to service.

In 1940 some of the class were reallocated to Crewe North (5A) and Glasgow Polmadie (27A, 66A from 1950). As the numbers grew, Crewe North was generally the beneficiary, but in 1946 Carlisle Upperby (12B, 12A from 1958), received an initial allocation of six locomotives. At various times locomotives were also seconded to Liverpool Edge Hill (8A). A typical allocation of the 1950s was Camden 15, Crewe North 10, Polmadie 9 and Upperby 4.

During the 1960s the installation of overhead electrification commenced between London Euston and both Liverpool Lime Street and Manchester Piccadilly. Phase 1 comprised electrification between Crewe and Liverpool and Manchester. Phase 2 involved the extension southwards from Crewe to London. The massive proportions of the Coronation Class resulted in their prohibition from operating under those wires. Camden's allocation was now run down (the remaining locomotives being transferred to nearby Willesden (1A)), whilst Polmadie's was dispensed with entirely. The bulk of the class was situated at either Crewe North or Carlisle, the Kingmoor shed (12A, 68A from 1958) now being used in addition to Upperby.

=== Table of shed allocations ===
The entire class saw service at the following sheds. The table lists the recorded allocations, but many temporary loans are not recorded – throughout the working life of the class, these may have been considerable. It also ignores the participation of No. 46236 in the Locomotive Exchange Trials of 1948, the transfer of No. 46225 to the Rugby Test Station for several months in 1955 and the secondment of Nos. 46237, 46254 and 46257 to the Western Region in 1955 and 1956.

There were wide variations in these histories. Six of the 1937–38 batches led a quiet life, being situated at Polmadie for the whole of their lives, apart from their initial spell at Camden. Others were moved from shed to shed for most of their lives, Nos. 6228, 6251 and 6252 being particularly well travelled.

LMS No.	BR No.	Name	Camden (1B)	Crewe-North (5A)	Glasgow Polmadie (66A)	Carlisle Upperby (12B)	Carlisle K'moor (12A)	Holyhead (6J)	L'pool Speke Jct. (8C)	L'pool Edge Hill (8A)	M'chstr L'sight	Rugby	Willesden
6220	46220	Coronation	1937–39	1958–61	1939–58	1961–63							
6221	46221	Queen Elizabeth	1937–39; 1959–60	1939; 1958–59; 1960–61	1939–58	1961; 1962–63	1961–62						
6222	46222	Queen Mary	1937–39		1939–63								
6223	46223	Princess Alice	1937–39		1939–63								
6224	46224	Princess Alexandra	1937–39		1939–63								
6225	46225	Duchess of Gloucester	1938–39; 1943–46; 1947–49; 1952	1940–43; 1946–47; 1949–52; 1952–59		1959–64		1939–40					
6226	46226	Duchess of Norfolk	1938–39; 1939–40; 1943–46; 1951	1940–43; 1956		1946–51; 1951–53; 1953–55; 1955–56; 1956–64		1939	1939	1953; 1955			
6227	46227	Duchess of Devonshire	1938–39; 1943–46; 1947	1940–43; 1947–48	1948–62	1946–47		1939–40					
6228	46228	Duchess of Rutland	1938–39; 1943–46; 1951	1940–43; 1957–59; 1964		1946–51; 1951–54; 1954–57; 1959–64		1939–40		1954	1939	1939	
6229	46229	Duchess of Hamilton (In U.S.A.1939–42)	1943–47; 1948–49; 1952–60	1938–39; 1942–43; 1947–48; 1949–50; 1951–52; 1960–61		1950–51				1961–64			
6230	46230	Duchess of Buccleuch	1938–40		1940–63								
6231	46231	Duchess of Atholl	1938–40		1940–62								
6232	46232	Duchess of Montrose	1938–40		1940–62								
6233	46233	Duchess of Sutherland	1938–44; 1960	1944–58; 1958–60		1958				1960–64			
6234	46234	Duchess of Abercorn	1938–43; 1959	1943–59		1959–63							
6235	46235	City of Birmingham	October 1952 – September 1958	June 1939 – October 1952						September 1958 – September 1964			
6236	46236	City of Bradford	1939; 1939–44; 1948; 1951–58	1944–1948; 1948–51		1958–61; 1961–62	1962–64			1961			
6237	46237	City of Bristol	1939; 1939–58			1958–61; 1962–64	1961–62				1939	1939	
6238	46238	City of Carlisle	1939–47; 1950; 1951	1939		1947–50; 1950–51; 1951–64							
6239	46239	City of Chester	1939; 1939–63	1964									1963–64
6240	46240	City of Coventry	1940–63	1940; 1964									1963–64
6241	46241	City of Edinburgh	1940–58	1940; 1958–61; 1964						1961–64			
6242	46242	City of Glasgow	1940–44; 1948–53; 1954–61	1953–54	1944–48; 1961–63								
6243	46243	City of Lancaster	1940–48; 1960–61	1948–58; 1958–60		1958				1948; 1961–64			
6244	46244	City of Leeds (to 1941); King George VI	1940–58			1958–61	1961–64						
6245	46245	City of London	1943–63	1964									1963–64
6246	46246	City of Manchester	1943–48; 1960–63	1948–60									
6247	46247	City of Liverpool	1943–61				1961–63						
6248	46248	City of Leeds	1943–48; 1960; 1960	1948–54; 1954–60; 1960; 1960–64		1954							
6249	46249	City of Sheffield	1949–54	1944; 1954–61	1944–46; 1961–63	1946–49							
6250	46250	City of Lichfield	1949–58	1944	1944–46	1946–49; 1958–64							
6251	46251	City of Nottingham	1948; 1949; 1950; 1954	1944; 1948–49; 1956–57; 1957–64	1944–46	1946–48; 1949–50; 1950–54; 1955; 1956; 1957				1948; 1954–55; 1955–56			
6252	46252	City of Leicester	1950; 1951; 1951–52; 1952; 1962–63	1944–50; 1950–51; 1951; 1952; 1952–53; 1953–56; 1956–60		1953; 1956; 1960–61	1961–62						
6253	46253	City of St. Albans	1946–49; 1949; 1950; 1952–57	1952; 1957–63		1949; 1949–50; 1950–52							
6254	46254	City of Stoke-on-Trent	1946–49; 1953–60	1952–53; 1960–64		1949–52; 1953							
6255	46255	City of Hereford	1946–48; 1953	1952		1948–52; 1953; 1953–61	1961–64						
6256	46256	Sir William A. Stanier F.R.S.	1948–59; 1960	1947–48; 1960–64		1959–60							
Post LMS	46257	City of Salford	1948–59; 1960	1947–48; 1960–64		1959–60							

== Records ==
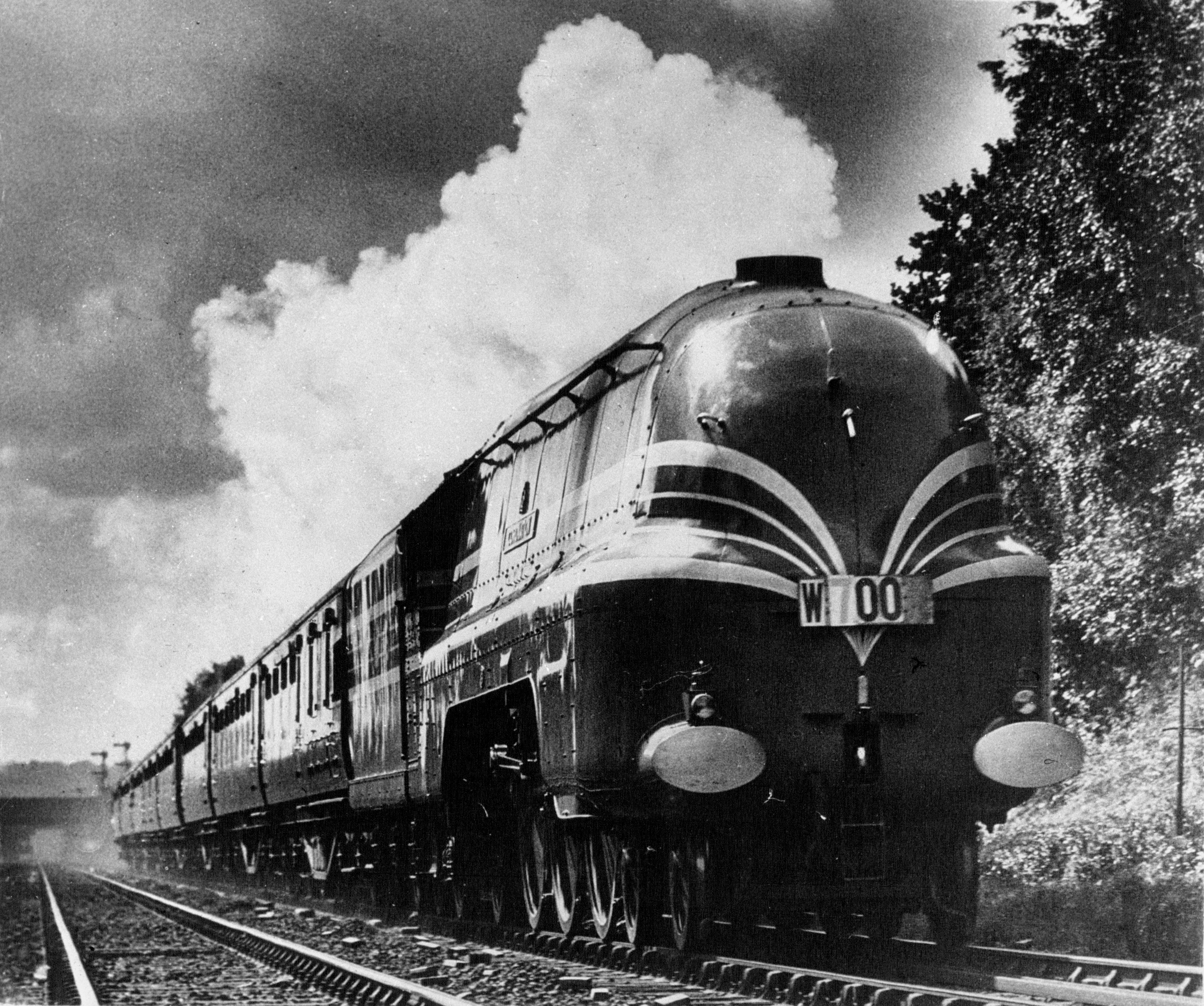
No. 6220 Coronation on its record breaking journey on 29 June 1937.

=== British speed record ===
Between 1937 and 1939, two significant records were set by locomotives of the Coronation class. Before the introduction of the Coronation Scot service, No. 6220 Coronation headed a special train of invited guests from London Euston to Crewe on 29 June 1937. After a fast but uneventful run the engine was accelerated up to high speed. Just south of Crewe, the train (disputably) achieved a speed of 114 miles per hour (183 km/h), narrowly beating the previous British record for a steam locomotive (held by the London and North Eastern Railway (LNER)). The brakes were applied far too late at such a speed and the result was that the train entered a series of crossover points at Crewe much too fast. Fortunately, Stanier had designed an inherently stable locomotive and both Coronation and its following train held the rails, although most of the crockery in the dining car was smashed, much to the consternation of the assembled guests In contrast to the LNER's record-breaking effort the previous year, when A4 Class No. 2512 had suffered severe damage when the centre cylinder's big end bearing failed, No.6220 was undamaged and was driven back to London the same day at an average speed of 79.9 miles per hour (128.6 km/h), maintaining over 100 mph for several miles. The LNER was to regain its ascendancy on 3 July 1938 when A4 Class No. 4468, Mallard regained the British and world records with a recorded maximum speed of 126 miles per hour (203 km/h).

=== British power record ===
Following an earlier test using No. 6234 Duchess of Abercorn which indicated that the locomotive's power was compromised by its single blastpipe, a double blastpipe and chimney were installed. On 26 February 1939, a retest was undertaken and No. 6234 hauled a train of 20 coaches, including a dynamometer car, from Crewe to Glasgow and back. Even though the load was 610 long tons (680 short tons; 620 t), the train was hauled up the climbs to the summits at Shap and Beattock at unprecedented speeds. Drawbar horsepower, representing the power conveyed directly to the 20 coach train, was frequently over 2,000 hp (1,500 kW) and a maximum of 2,511 hp (1,872 kW) was recorded. This remains the official British record for a steam locomotive to this day. Because there were unmeasured variables, the horsepower at the cylinders could only be estimated; Cecil J. Allen thought it to be 3,333 hp (2,485 kW) whilst O. S. Nock was more conservative at 3,209 hp (2,393 kW). This sustained power output could not be expected on day-to-day service as it was beyond the shovelling capacity of a single fireman, and two firemen were carried for this test run.

Some seventeen years later, No. 46225 Duchess of Gloucester, a virtually identical sister engine, was tested by British Railways on the open road on the Settle and Carlisle line. Again it was established that a continuous drawbar horsepower of 2,000 hp (1,500 kW) was readily sustainable. Strangely, the drawbar power output on the stationary test plant at Rugby could only be coaxed up to an absolute maximum of 1,710 hp (1,280 kW) which in retrospect casts doubt on the validity of the methodology.

== 1948 locomotive exchange trials ==
In May 1948 the BR Executive arranged a series of locomotive exchanges whereby each of the "Big Four" previously independent companies would submit its various locomotives for evaluation. It was intended that each locomotive would be tested not only on its own home territory, but on the tracks of its three other "rivals". The aim was to ascertain the best qualities of the competing locomotives in order to help design future locomotives. In that dynamometer cars were to accompany the test trains, whilst coal consumption was to be accurately measured, it was unclear whether the aim was to test the locomotives for power or for efficiency – the two are somewhat incompatible.

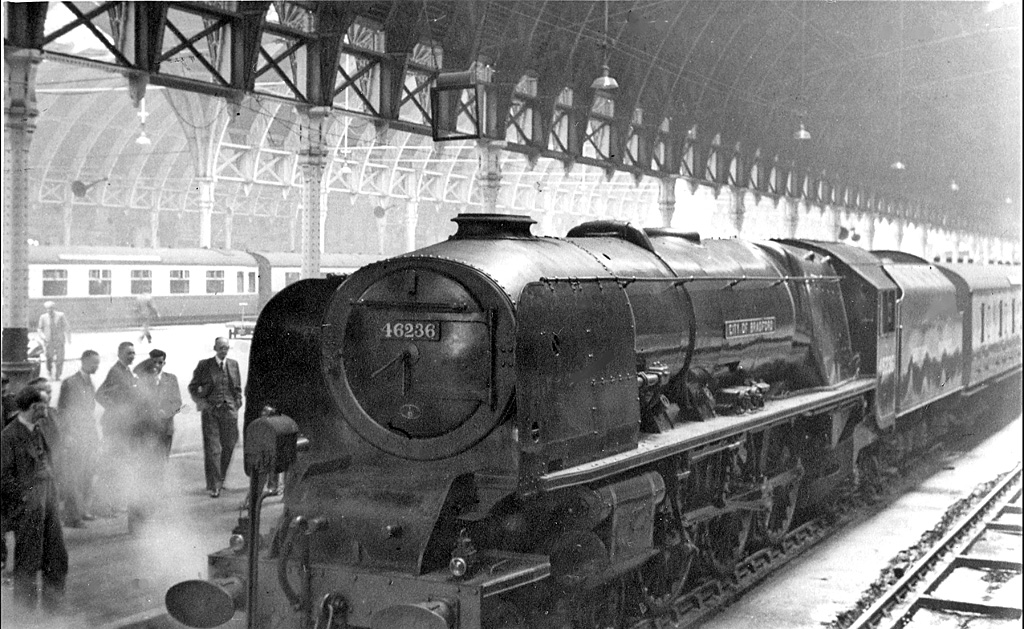
No. 46236 City of Bradford at Paddington on the WR during the 1948 locomotive exchange trials.

The locomotive classes were all pre-chosen by BR, but the various regions were free to choose, within certain parameters, which specific locomotives were to be represented. Tasked with supplying a suitable Coronation, the London Midland Region (LMR) selected No. 46236 City of Bradford. Regions were also free to choose their drivers. To drive the engine throughout, the LMR chose driver Byford from Camden shed who was seen to be sufficiently experienced. City of Bradford was then tested on its home ground between London Euston and Carlisle, on the Eastern Region (ER) between London Kings Cross and Leeds, on the Western Region (WR) between London Paddington and Plymouth, then finally on the Southern Region (SR) between London Waterloo and Exeter.

The results showed that, compared with its peer locomotives, City of Bradford's coal consumption was the second lowest (and well below the third lowest), but its power output was well below any of its peers. In later years some insight has emerged concerning No. 46236's outings. On the WR, having arrived at Plymouth from Paddington, the dynamometer crew were amazed that such a large locomotive had consumed so little coal; on the undulating tracks of the SR west of Salisbury, it was alleged that coal consumption was held down by running gently uphill then racing downhill without any attempt to follow the timetable passing times. Additionally, a photograph of the locomotive leaving Kings Cross, bound for Leeds on the ER, shows the locomotive with so little coal on board that none could be seen even from a somewhat elevated vantage point. In other publications, driver Byford has been heavily criticised for his lacklustre driving. Certainly, Byford was so obsessed with minimising coal consumption that he never attempted to demonstrate any other facet of performance, but when coal consumption was being so accurately measured it was a reasonable assumption to draw that coal efficiency was the predominant requirement. Many years later, there was a degree of exoneration for driver Byford when the whole procedure was described as "the most inconsequential and unrepresentative series of competitive trials ever to be held on the railways of Great Britain".

== Accidents and incidents ==
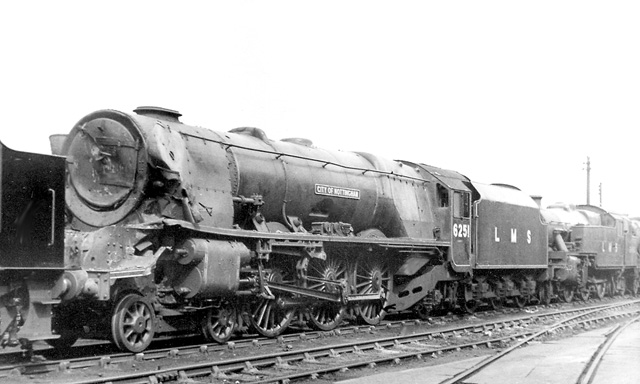
No. 6251 City of Nottingham showing the damage to its front end following the 1948 collision at Winsford.

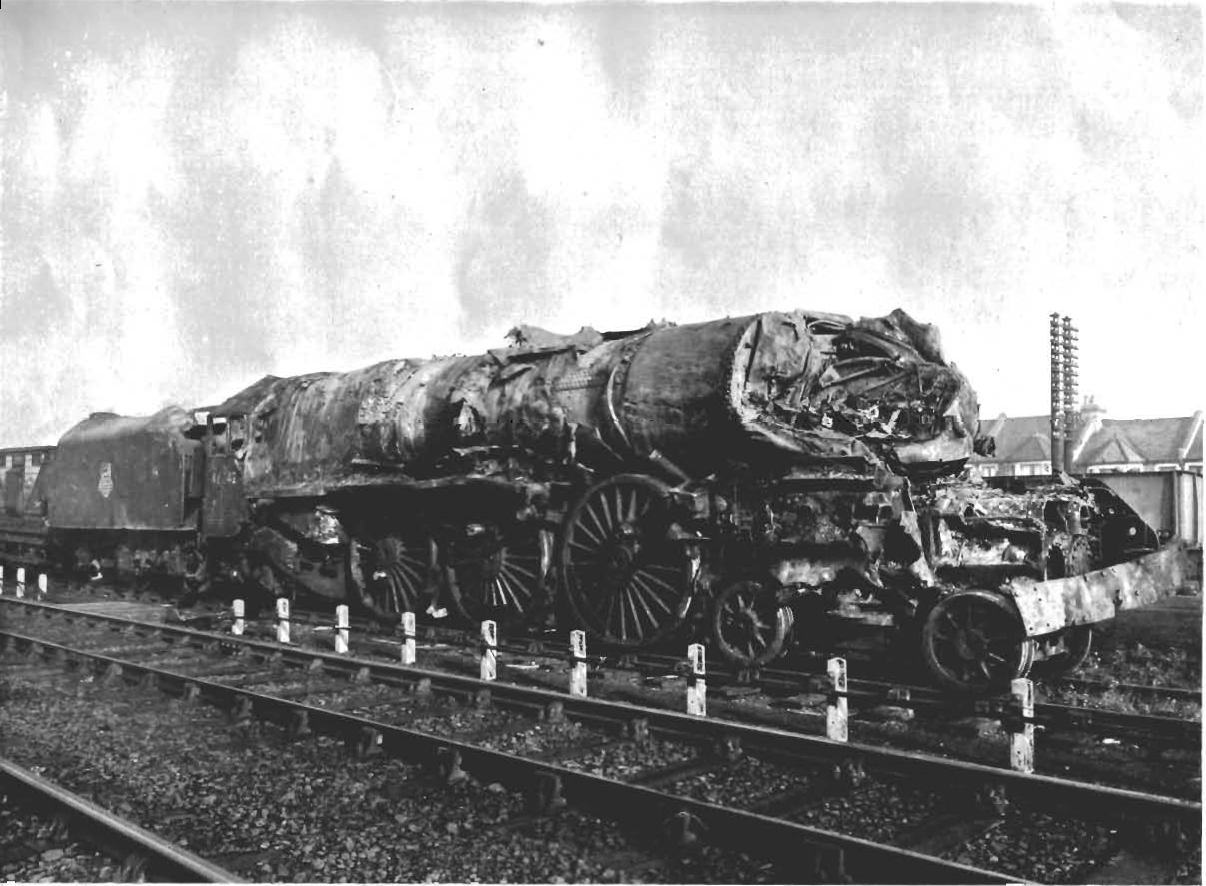
No. 46242 City of Glasgow after the 1952 Harrow and Wealdstone collision. Despite the extensive damage it was subsequently repaired and returned to service.

- On 21 July 1945, locomotive No. 6231 Duchess of Atholl was hauling an express passenger train which overran signals and collided with a freight train that was being shunted at Ecclefechan, Dumfriesshire. Two people were killed and three were injured.
- On 21 July 1947, locomotive No. 6244 King George VI was derailed at 60 mph (97 km/h) near Polesworth, Warwickshire due to the poor state of the track following the years of neglect throughout the Second World War. Coaches piled up behind it and five passengers were killed and 64 injured.
- On 19 November 1951 No. 46252 City of Leicester, whilst traversing from the fast line to the slow, was derailed at almost the same spot. This time there was no pile-up and no serious injury.
- On 17 April 1948, locomotive No. 6251 City of Nottingham was hauling a mail train which was in a rear-end collision with a passenger train at Winsford, Cheshire. In the first major accident for the newly formed British Railways, 24 people were killed and thirty injured.
- On 25 April 1949, locomotive No. 46230 Duchess of Buccleuch was hauling a passenger train that overran a signal and was derailed at Douglas Park Signal Box, Motherwell, Lanarkshire. The signalman was suspected of having deliberately moved points under the train.
- On 8 October 1952, locomotive No. 46242 City of Glasgow was hauling an express passenger train when it overran signals and crashed into a local passenger train at Harrow and Wealdstone, Middlesex. Another express passenger train ran into the wreckage. In the second deadliest railway accident in the United Kingdom, 112 people were killed; 102 at the scene and 10 more died later from their injuries; no fewer than 340 people were injured.
- On 3 February 1954, locomotive No. 46250 City of Lichfield was hauling a passenger train that was derailed inside Watford Tunnel, Hertfordshire due to a broken rail. The rear three carriages became divided from the train at Watford Junction station, with one of them ending up on the platform. Fifteen people were injured.

There were three instances of firebox crown collapse, resulting in boiler explosions. No. 6224 Princess Alexandra suffered a severe failure at Craigenhill on 10 September 1940 due to the inexperience of the crew (who both perished). The same locomotive suffered a similar failure on 7 March 1948 at Lamington due to dirty and malfunctioning water gauge glasses. The third incident occurred as No. 46238 City of Carlisle was passing Bletchley on 24 January 1962 – this was attributed to faulty design of the water gauge glasses.

== Withdrawals ==
=== Overview ===
The London Midland Region, compared with some of the other Regions, was slow to discard its "Big Engines". By a matter of a few days, the Western Region had managed to withdraw the whole of its King Class locomotives before the Coronation Class lost its first. The beginning of the end occurred late in December 1962 when it was deemed uneconomic to proceed with major repairs required by three locomotives. Nos. 46227, 46231 and 46232 were therefore summarily withdrawn.

Nos. 46234, 46246 and 46253 followed the next month and throughout 1963 the entire initial batch, Nos. 46220-46224, was withdrawn along with Nos. 46230, 46242, 46247, 46249 and 46252. These withdrawals meant that by the New Year of 1964, there were only 22 of the class remaining. Nos. 46229, 46233 and 46236 followed in early 1964, although two of this group – No. 46229 Duchess of Hamilton and No. 46233 Duchess of Sutherland – were destined for preservation.

Attempts were now made to find a role for the remaining 19 locomotives. By now many had been relegated to hauling trains in what were once seen as remote outposts of the LMS. Often they were reduced to pulling stopping trains, empty stock trains, or even goods trains. Only one realistic mainline role was contemplated: to replace the Scottish Region A4 Class on the testing route between Edinburgh Waverley and Aberdeen. This idea was discarded largely because it would be excessively problematic to train the A4 crews to operate the Coronations. With no credible role, only one option remained: in July 1964 it was resolved that the remaining 19 locomotives were to be withdrawn from 12 September.

Accordingly, the remaining locomotives were nominally taken out of service on 12 September 1964 apart from No. 46256 Sir William A. Stanier, F.R.S which hauled a special train on 26 September 1964. By October all were officially withdrawn. Up until March 1964 all the withdrawn Coronation class locomotives were cut up for scrap at Crewe Works, but the simultaneous withdrawal of all nineteen remaining locomotives in the autumn of 1964 (one of which was preserved) was too much to deal with and the work was contracted out to private firms. J. Cashmore at Great Bridge, Staffordshire, accounted for nine of the batch, the West of Scotland Shipbreaking Company at Troon, Ayrshire, dispatched eight and the Central Wagon Company at Wigan, Lancashire, disposed of the one remaining.

=== Table of withdrawals ===
The following table lists the fate of the Coronation Class locomotives following their withdrawal from service.

BR No.	Name	Withdrawn	Location of storage	Scrapped	Location of scrappage
46220	Coronation	Apr 1963	Crewe North	May 1963	Crewe Works
46221	Queen Elizabeth	May 1963	Willesden	Jul 1963	Crewe Works
46222	Queen Mary	Oct 1963	Polmadie	Nov 1963	Crewe Works
46223	Princess Alice	Oct 1963	Polmadie	Oct 1963	Crewe Works
46224	Princess Alexandra	Oct 1963	Polmadie	Oct 1963	Crewe Works
46225	Duchess of Gloucester	Oct 1964	Upperby	Dec 1964	West of Scotland Shipbreaking Company
46226	Duchess of Norfolk	Oct 1964	Kingmoor (Carlisle)	Feb 1965	West of Scotland Shipbreaking Company
46227	Duchess of Devonshire	Dec 1962	Parkhead (Glasgow)	Nov 1963	Crewe Works
46228	Duchess of Rutland	Oct 1964	Crewe North	Dec 1964	J. Cashmore
46229	Duchess of Hamilton	Feb 1964			Preserved and displayed at the National Railway Museum, York.
46230	Duchess of Buccleuch	Nov 1963	Polmadie	Dec 1963	Crewe Works
46231	Duchess of Atholl	Dec 1962	Polmadie (to Sep 1963); Carstairs (Lanarkshire)	Nov 1963	Crewe Works
46232	Duchess of Montrose	Dec 1962	Polmadie (to Sep 1963); Carstairs	Nov 1963	Crewe Works
46233	Duchess of Sutherland	Feb 1964			Preserved and displayed at Butlin's Holiday Camp, Ayr
46234	Duchess of Abercorn	Jan 1963	Upperby	Jun 1963	Crewe Works
46235	City of Birmingham	Oct 1964			Preserved and displayed at the Museum of Science and Industry, Birmingham
46236	City of Bradford	Mar 1964	Kingmoor	Apr 1964	Crewe Works
46237	City of Bristol	Oct 1964	Upperby	Dec 1964	West of Scotland Shipbreaking Company
46238	City of Carlisle	Oct 1964	Upperby	Dec 1964	West of Scotland Shipbreaking Company
46239	City of Chester	Oct 1964	Crewe North	Dec 1964	J Cashmore
46240	City of Coventry	Oct 1964	Crewe North	Mar 1965	J. Cashmore
46241	City of Edinburgh	Sep 1964	Edge Hill	Jan 1965	J. Cashmore
46242	City of Glasgow	Oct 1963	Parkhead	Nov 1963	Crewe Works
46243	City of Lancaster	Oct 1964	Edge Hill	Jan 1965	Central Wagon Company
46244	King George VI	Oct 1964	Kingmoor	Dec 1964	West of Scotland Shipbreaking Company
46245	City of London	Oct 1964	Crewe North	Dec 1964	J. Cashmore
46246	City of Manchester	Jan 1963	Camden	May 1963	Crewe Works
46247	City of Liverpool	Jun 1963	Kingmoor	Jul 1963	Crewe Ẃorks
46248	City of Leeds	Sep 1964	Crewe North	Nov 1964	J. Cashmore
46249	City of Sheffield	Nov 1963	Polmadie	Dec 1963	Crewe Works
46250	City of Lichfield	Oct 1964	Upperby	Dec 1964	West of Scotland Shipbreaking Company
46251	City of Nottingham	Oct 1964	Crewe North	Dec 1964	J. Cashmore
46252	City of Leicester	Jun 1963	Camden	Sep 1963	Crewe Works
46253	City of St. Albans	Jan 1963	Crewe North	May 1963	Crewe Works
46254	City of Stoke-on-Trent	Oct 1964	Crewe North	Dec 1964	J. Cashmore
46255	City of Hereford	Oct 1964	Kingmoor	Dec 1964	West of Scotland Shipbreaking Company
46256	Sir William A. Stanier, F.R.S.	Oct 1964	Crewe North	Dec 1964	J. Cashmore
46257	City of Salford	Oct 1964	Kingmoor	Dec 1964	West of Scotland Shipbreaking Company

== Preservation ==
=== Histories of the three preserved locomotives ===
Three of the 38 original members of the Coronation Class were preserved: 6229, 6233 and 6235. The first two have run on mainlines. The third has not been steamed since British Rail withdrew it. A preservationist, Peter Beet, tried but failed to save 6243 City of Lancaster

Current numbers indicated in bold.

Number		Name	Built	De-streamlined	Withdrawn	Livery	Location	Owners	Status	Photograph
**6229**	46229	Duchess of Hamilton	Sept 1938	Jan 1948	Feb 1964	LMS Crimson Lake	National Railway Museum, York	National Collection	Static Display	
**6233**	46233	Duchess of Sutherland	Jul 1938	—	Feb 1964	LMS Crimson Lake	Midland Railway, Butterley	Princess Royal Class Locomotive Trust	Operational, Mainline Certified. Mainline Ticket Expires: 2025	
6235	**46235**	City of Birmingham	Jul 1939	Apr 1946	Oct 1964	BR Green, Late Crest	Birmingham Science Museum	Birmingham Science Museum	Static Display	

==== No. 46229 Duchess of Hamilton ====
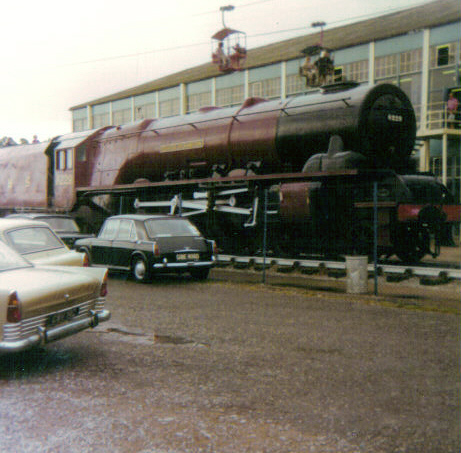
No. 6229 Duchess of Hamilton in pseudo-LMS livery with smoke deflectors removed at Butlin's Holiday Camp, Minehead, in August 1974

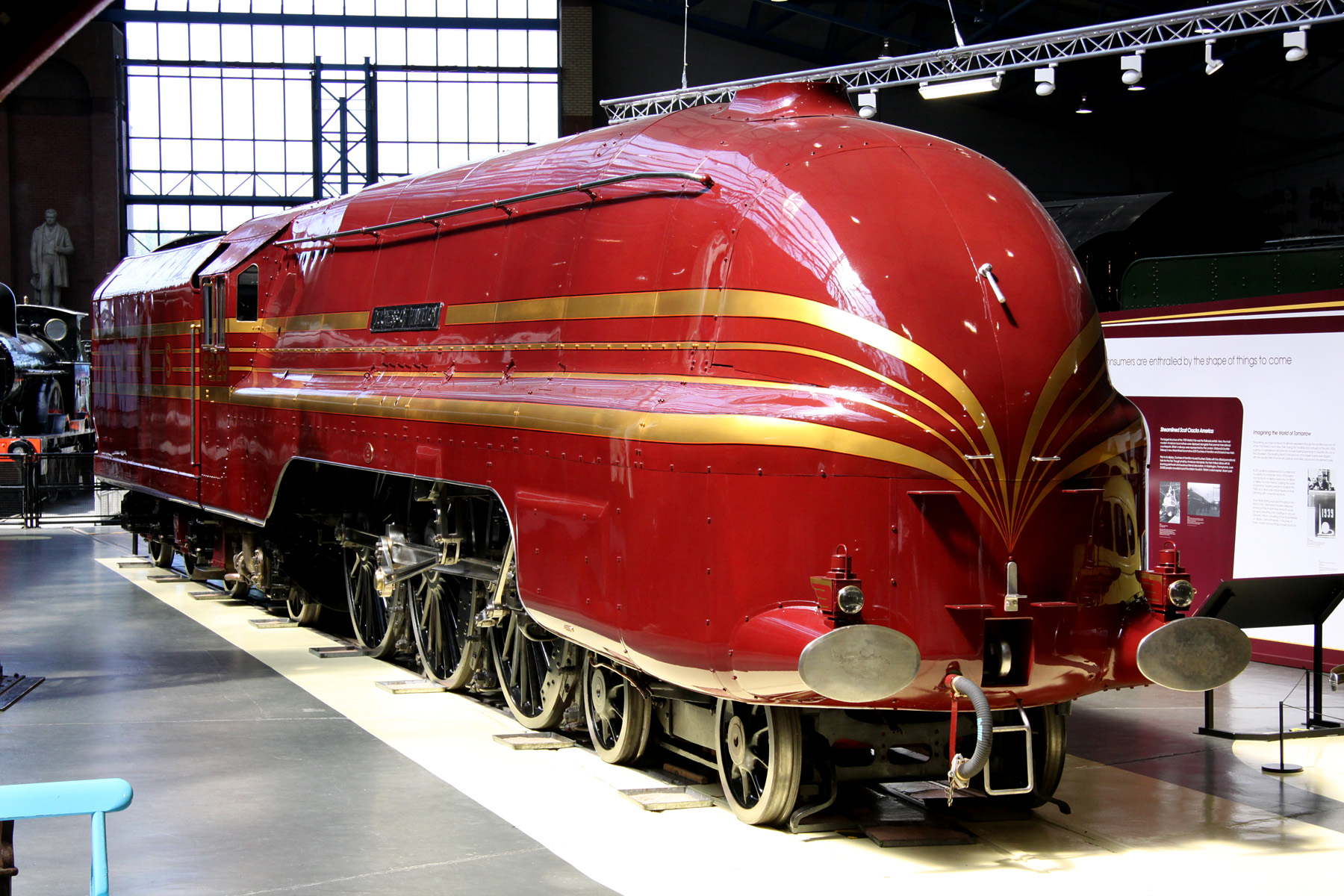
No. 6229 on display at York after re-streamlining at Tyseley.

Following its withdrawal in February 1964, no. 46229 Duchess of Hamilton was purchased by the holiday camp giant Butlin's, and put on display at their Minehead site. In 1975, following a slow deterioration due to Minehead's salty atmosphere, and the looming maintenance costs, Butlin's signed a twenty-year loan agreement for it to be taken under the wing of the National Railway Museum. In 1976, following a cosmetic overhaul, No. 46229 was put on static display in the museum's York premises. In due course a fundraising appeal allowed an overhaul to take place as a precursor to letting the locomotive operate on the national rail network once more.

In April 1980 the locomotive again took to the rails and thereafter was employed in hauling many enthusiasts' trains. After a substantial overhaul, the Duchess was declared fit in 1990 to continue working on the national network and at the same time the museum purchased it outright from Butlins. The engine also had its tender water tank capacity upgraded to 5,000 imp gal (23,000 L; 6,000 US gal) since all of the water troughs on the main line today were completely removed. In 1998, however, the locomotive returned to static display at the National Railway Museum in York.

Following a successful appeal run by Steam Railway magazine, it was decided to re-streamline No. 46229. The locomotive was moved to Tyseley Locomotive Works, for the work to be carried out. The project was completed in 2009, and the locomotive returned to York in May, now wearing its crimson streamlining and pre-war number 6229.

==== No. 46233 Duchess of Sutherland ====
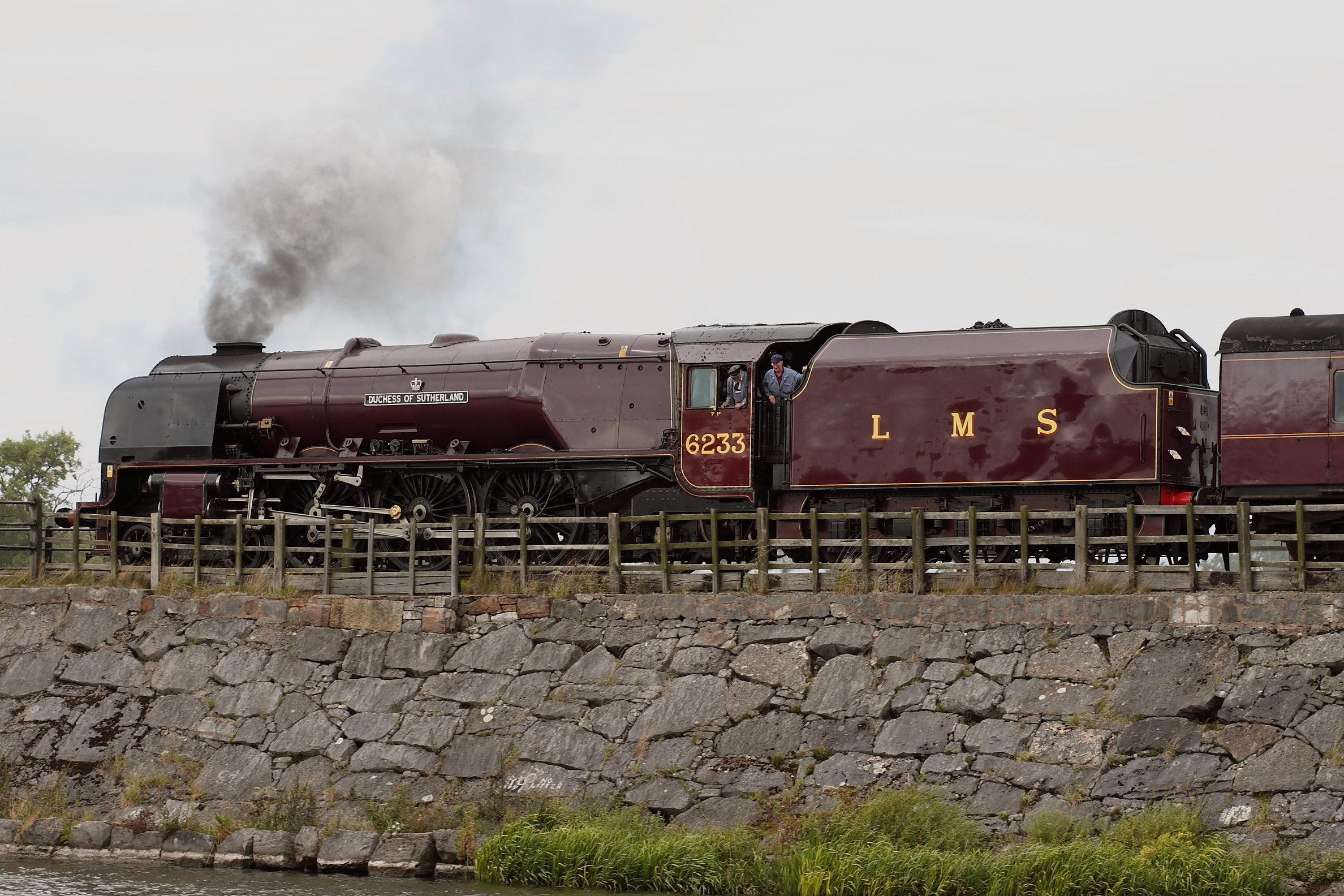
No. 6233 before its 2010–2012 overhaul. This livery is from 1938. The locomotive still wore this livery in 1946 when the smoke deflectors were added.

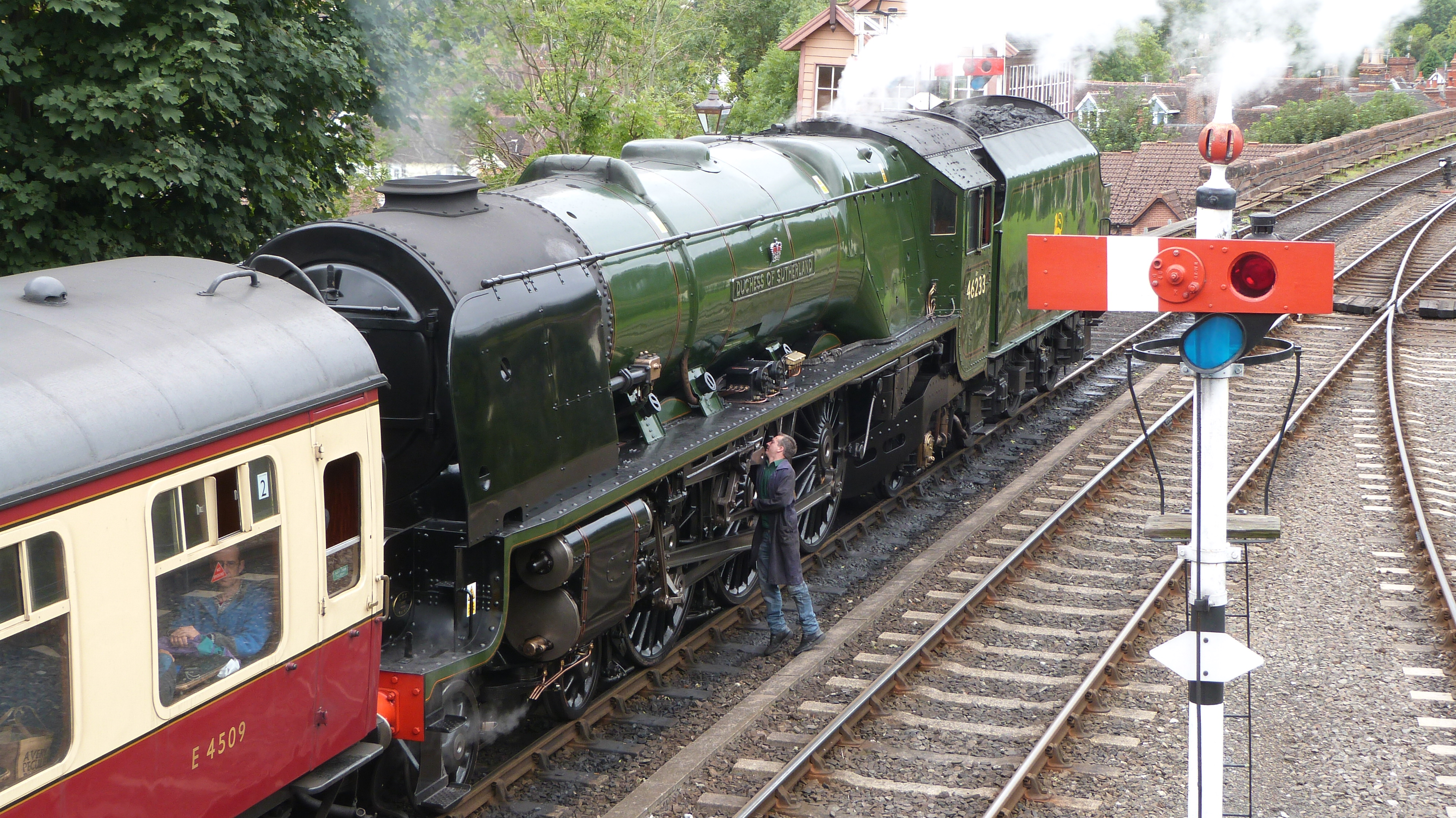
No. 46233 Duchess of Sutherland after its 2010–2012 overhaul.

No. 46233, which was withdrawn at the same time as No. 46229, was also purchased by Butlin's and it was displayed at its holiday camp at Ayr, although – like No. 6229 Duchess of Hamilton at Minehead – it was stripped of its smoke deflectors and painted in pseudo-LMS livery. By 1971 it had similarly deteriorated due to the salty seaside air and was in need of expensive maintenance. It was rescued by Alan Bloom, owner of Norfolk-based "Bloom's of Bressingham" nurseries; he had already taken over the Royal Scot Class No. 6100 from Butlin's Skegness holiday camp. In March 1971 No. 46233 was taken by rail and road to Bressingham on permanent loan.

Over the course of the next few years, Bloom spent some £16,000 restoring the locomotive (along with some 20,000 man hours) and in May 1974 it was restored to steam once more. Unfortunately, as 1976 progressed it was discovered that No. 46233 would require a new firebox tubeplate at a projected cost of £12,000. Bloom was not prepared to spend further money at this time and the engine became a static exhibit at Bressingham.

In 1989 Bloom bought the locomotive outright. During 1993 it was moved temporarily to the East Lancashire Railway at Bury near Manchester and whilst there an exercise was undertaken to establish what repairs were necessary and how much they would cost. It was found that the extensive list amounted to £162,000 and no business plan could be found that would support such expenditure.

In November 1995 the Princess Royal Class Locomotive Trust purchased the locomotive for £200,000 (through a third party) and the following February it was transferred to the Trust's premises at the Midland Railway in Butterley, Derbyshire. In 1998, funded by public donation and the Heritage Lottery Fund, the third party purchaser was paid off and the money was now available to restore the locomotive. The work was carried out at the railway workshops at Swanwick Junction and in July 2001 the restored locomotive was allowed a trial run on the national rail network, where it promptly broke down and had to be towed home. With the fault fixed, No. 46233 now started to generate income by hauling enthusiasts' trains, as well as the Royal Train on two occasions. Following another overhaul commencing in 2010, the locomotive resumed its steaming duties in 2012 this time wearing BR Lined Green with the early BR crest. This livery being chosen following a vote run by the PRCLT for what the engine would wear after its overhaul. It had originally been intended that 46233 would wear BR green for a year after returning to steam in 2012 before returning to its LMS Crimson lake identity a year later, it would however stay in its BR identity for an additional five years until the end of 2017. In early 2017 it had its early BR emblem replaced with the later crest and on its cabside it had the yellow cabside stripe applied, (in BR days the stripe was applied to locos which were not permitted to run under the overhead wires south of Crewe). During repairs which were undertaken at Butterley in 2018 the engine was repainted into its LMS crimson lake identity with its four digit LMS number. As of April 2025, 6233 is still owned by the Princess Royal Class Locomotive Trust and still pulling enthusiasts' specials.

==== No. 46235 City of Birmingham ====
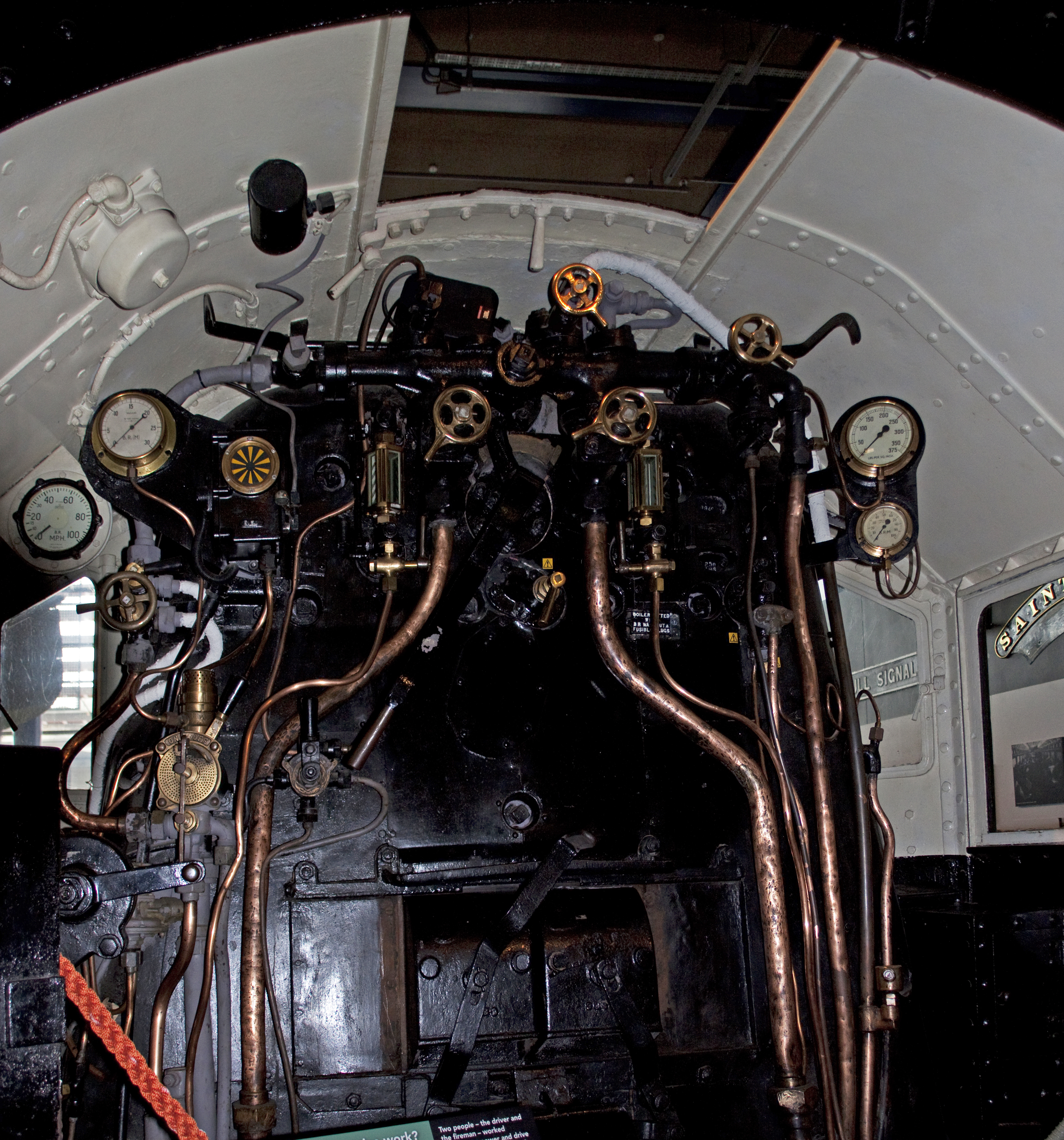
No. 46235 displaying the complex interior of its cab.

The locomotive's official naming ceremony took place in March 1945, when it was well over five years old. Alderman Wiggins-Davies performed the ceremony at the back end of Birmingham New Street station as the locomotive was too large to be accommodated within the main part of the station.

The city's love for its eponymous locomotive was borne out when, in 1953, Birmingham's Museum of Science and Industry determined that when the opportunity arose it would like to acquire No. 46235. The museum eventually made its purchase in October 1964, when the locomotive was withdrawn. After successive spells at Crewe Works, Nuneaton, Crewe again (for cosmetic overhaul), Saltley depot and the Birmingham Lawley Street container terminal, the locomotive was finally moved to the museum in May 1966. At that time the building was still under construction, being finally completed in 1972.

In 1997 Birmingham City Council decided to close the museum and to construct the brand new ThinkTank museum (since re-christened Thinktank, Birmingham Science Museum) in nearby Digbeth. In 2001 the locomotive was moved to the Thinktank where it remains as at September 2017. It differs significantly from the other two preserved locomotives as it represents the only example of a British Railways Coronation class locomotive which has not been run in preservation, as such, all of its parts are original.

== Models ==
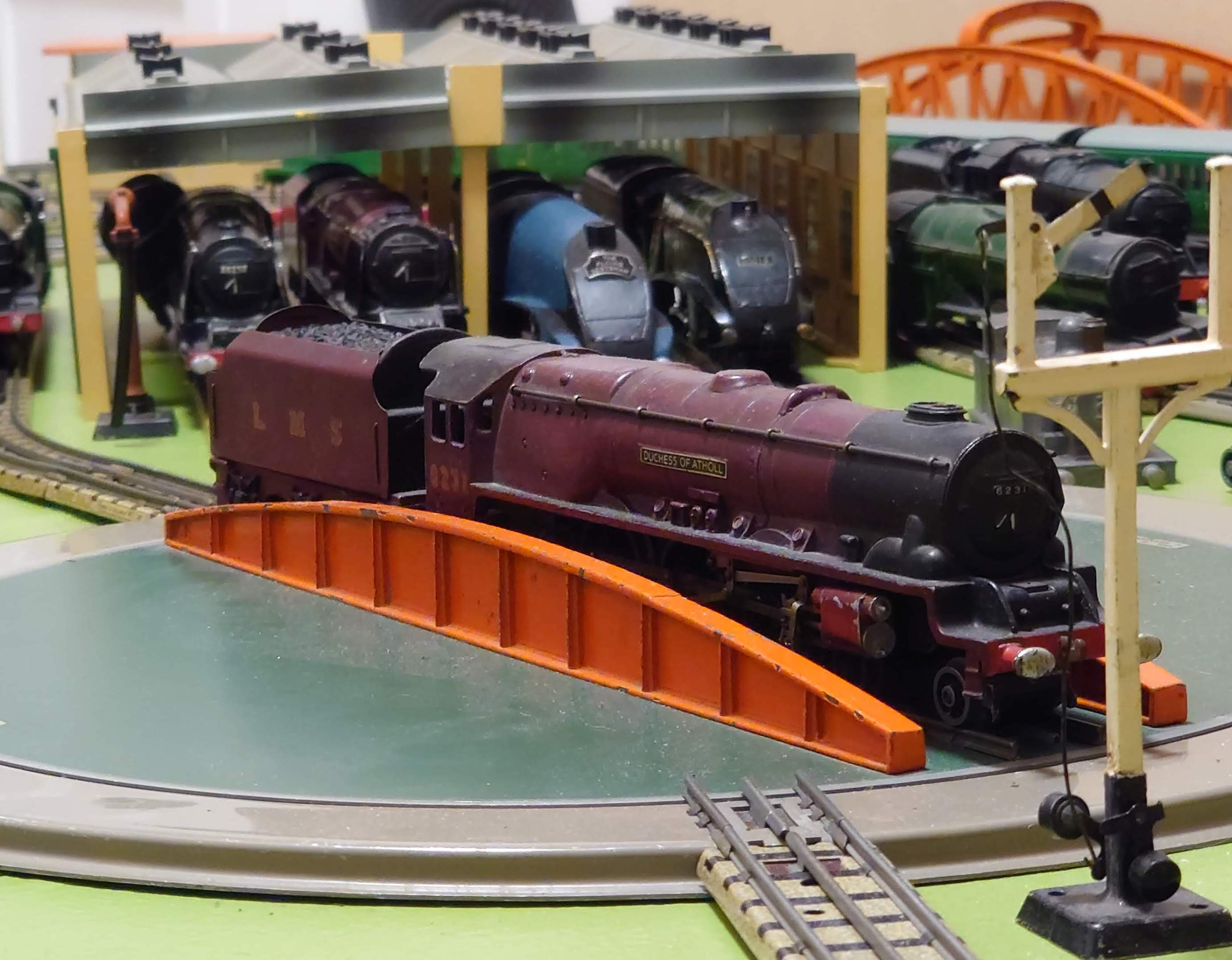
A Hornby Dublo model of 6231 'Duchess of Atholl' (released 1948) on a period 3-rail layout. In the engine shed behind, 46232 'Duchess of Montrose' (1953) and 46247 'City of Liverpool' (1959) can be seen with a pair of LNER Class A4 Pacifics.

The class has been extensively modelled by a broad range of manufacturers in both ready-to-run models and kit forms.

Hornby developed the first model of the class in OO gauge for their Dublo range in 1948, representing 6231 'Duchess of Atholl'. It was modelled with a heavy diecast 'Mazak' body and chassis with tin-plate tender, and finished in LMS Crimson Lake livery; motive power was via a 12v DC electric motor for Hornby's 3-rail track system. In 1953, smoke deflectors were added to the model, which was reliveried in BR Loco Dark Green and released as 46232 ‘Duchess of Montrose’. In 1959, the model was comprehensively retooled and released in both 3-rail and (for the first time) 2-rail versions as 46247 ‘City of Liverpool’ and 46245 ‘City of London’ respectively in BR Maroon livery with LMS-style lining. These locomotives had split footplates representing the de-streamlined versions of the locomotives, albeit with the full cylindrical smokeboxes of the later rebuilds.

After the collapse of the Meccano Ltd empire, Wrenn acquired Hornby's Dublo tooling and continued to produce a variety of locomotives of the class in various liveries using the 'City' body from 1969 until the early 1990s.

In 1970, Triang-Hornby produced a OO gauge model of the streamlined locomotives which utilised the tender base of the old Hornby Dublo model with a new polystyrene plastic body and a new Tri-ang chassis.

Hornby Railways have continued to release many incarnations of the class in both streamlined and conventional forms up to the present day.

Whitemetal and brass kits have been produced by various manufacturers including Keyser, Jamieson, Anchoridge and DJH, who have offered streamlined and conventional outlines in a variety of gauges.
