= LMS Princess Coronation Class 6235 City of Birmingham =

Preserved 4-6-2 steam locomotive

City of Birmingham
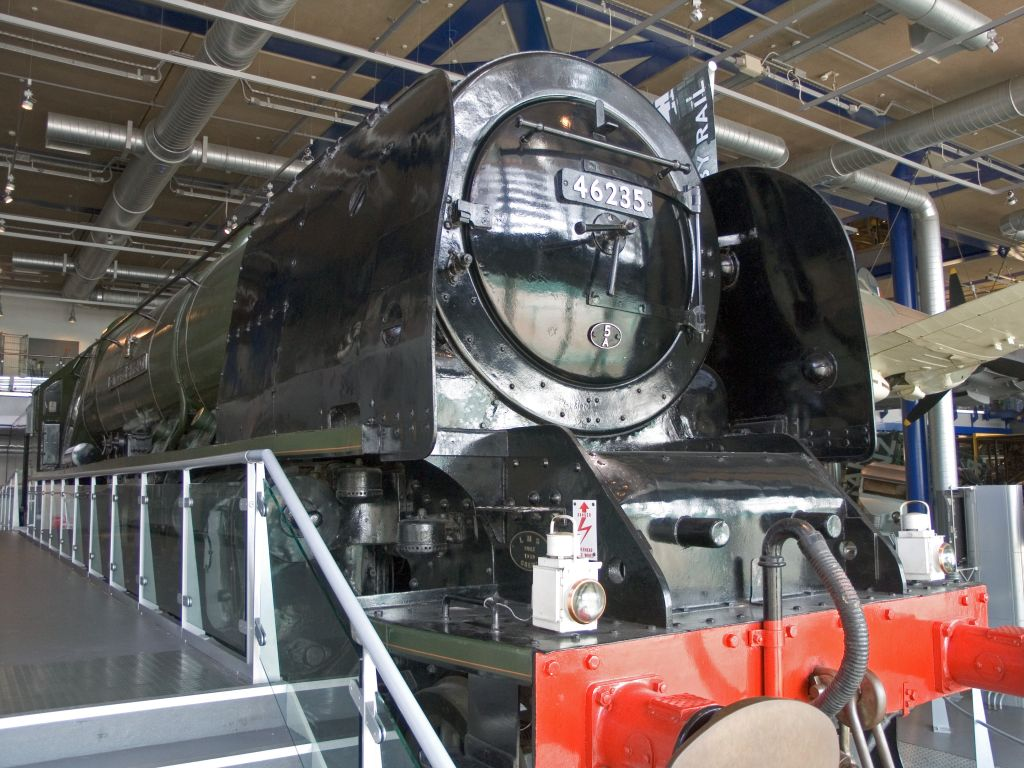
- City of Birmingham, as preserved at Thinktank, in 2005
Type and origin
- Power type: Steam
- Designer: William Stanier
- Builder: LMS Crewe Works
- Build date: 1939
Specifications
- Configuration
  - Whyte: 4-6-2
  - UIC: 2′C1′ h4
- Gauge: 4 ft 8 1/2 in (1,435 mm) standard gauge
- Leading dia.: 36 in (910 mm)
- Driver dia.: 81 in (2,060 mm)
- Trailing dia.: 45 in (1,140 mm)
- Length: 73 ft 10 1/4 in (22.51 m) (conventional), 73 ft 9 3/4 in (22.50 m) (streamlined)
- Loco weight: 105.25 long tons (106.94 t; 117.88 short tons) (conventional), 108.1 long tons (109.8 t; 121.1 short tons) (streamlined)
- Tender weight: 56.35 long tons (57.25 t; 63.11 short tons)
- Fuel type: Coal
- Fuel capacity: 10 long tons (10.2 t; 11.2 short tons)
- Water cap.: 4,000 imp gal (18,000 L; 4,800 US gal)
- Firebox
  - Grate area: 50 sq ft (4.6 m^{2})
- Boiler: LMS type 1X
- Boiler pressure: 250 psi (1.7 MPa) superheated
- Heating surface
  - Firebox: 230 sq ft (21 m^{2})
  - Tubes: 2,577 sq ft (239.4 m^{2})
- Superheater
  - Heating area: 822–856 sq ft (76.4–79.5 m^{2})
- Cylinders: 4
- Cylinder size: 16 1/2 in × 28 in (419 mm × 711 mm)
- Valve gear: Walschaerts for outside cylinders with rocking shafts for inside cylinders,
- Valve type: piston valves
Performance figures
- Tractive effort: 40,000 lbf (180 kN)
Career
- Class: LMS Coronation Class
- Power class: 7P, later 8P
- Retired: 1964
- Disposition: Static display

London Midland and Scottish Railway (LMS), Coronation Class, LMS No. 6235, British Railways No. 46235 City of Birmingham is a preserved British steam locomotive.

== Construction and BR service ==
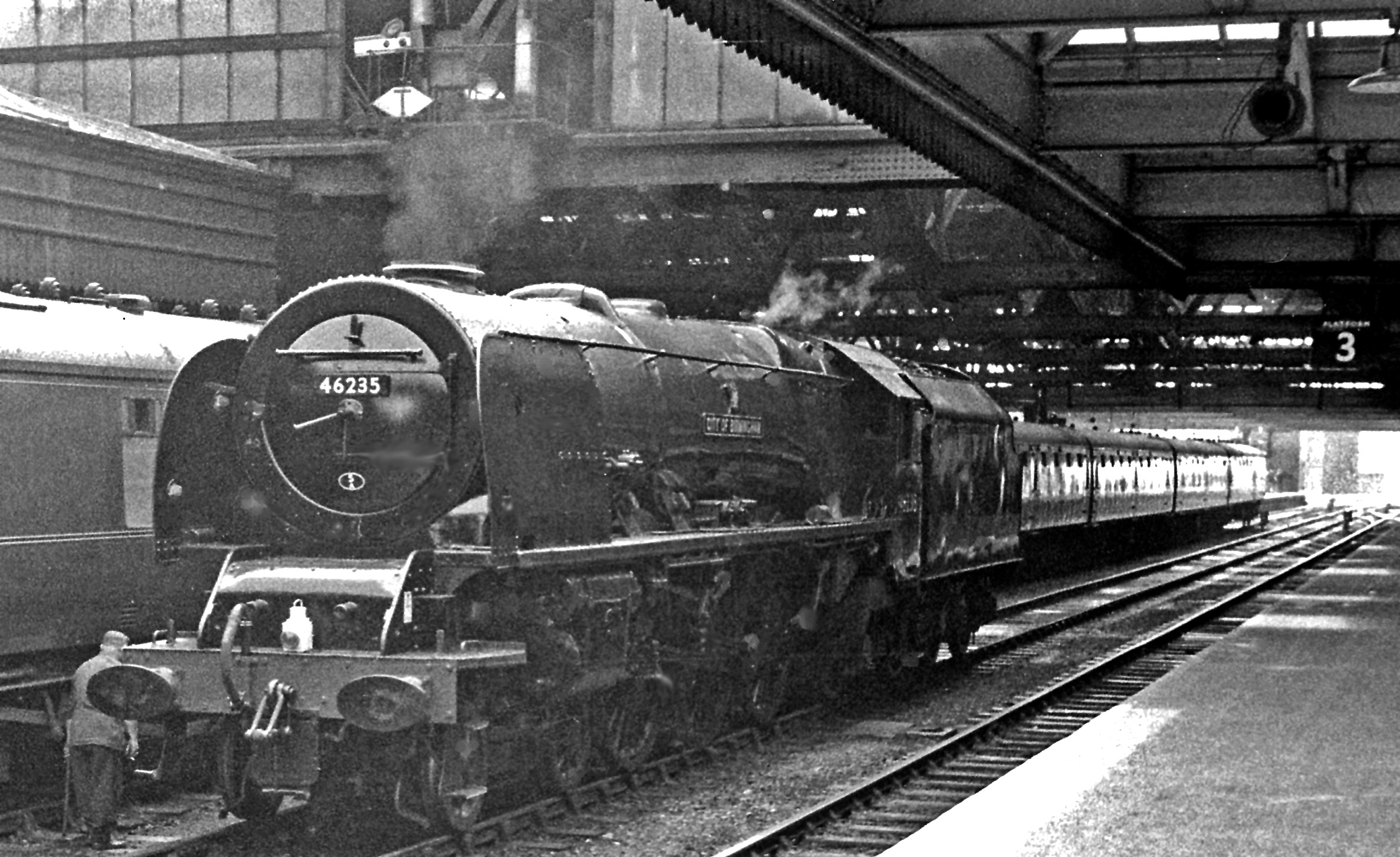
City of Birmingham at Shrewsbury station in June 1962

6235 was originally built in 1939 at Crewe, and entered LMS stock in July 1939, one of the third batch (Lot No. 150). As built it was streamlined and was the first to be fitted with a double chimney (previous locomotives being built with single chimneys and later modified). Its livery was LMS crimson lake with cheat lines, but during the Second World War it acquired austere unlined black livery. Though it carried the name City of Birmingham from new, 6235 was officially named at a ceremony at Birmingham New Street on 20 March 1945, and a special coat of arms plate was then fitted above the nameplate. The streamlining was removed for maintenance reasons in April 1946, making 6235 the first streamliner to be destreamlined, and at the same time it was fitted with smoke deflectors, and livery continued to be black.

6235 passed to British Railways ownership in 1948, and in March was given the BR number 46235, which was applied in May. It was one of the engines given the short-lived blue livery for top express passenger engines in 1950. In April 1952, the semi-streamlined sloping smokebox front was replaced with a round-topped smokebox. 46235 was repainted into BR Green livery from April 1953, and it retained this livery through withdrawal in September 1964 and through into preservation.

== Preservation ==
46235 was prepared by BR for preservation, and after storage at Nuneaton MPD, moved to the Birmingham Museum of Science and Industry, which was built around the locomotive. After closure of that museum, 46235 was moved into Thinktank, Birmingham Science Museum in 1997.

Unlike the other two surviving members of the class, City of Birmingham has never steamed in preservation and it had sat on permanent static display.
