= LMS Coronation Class 6220 Coronation =

British steam locomotive

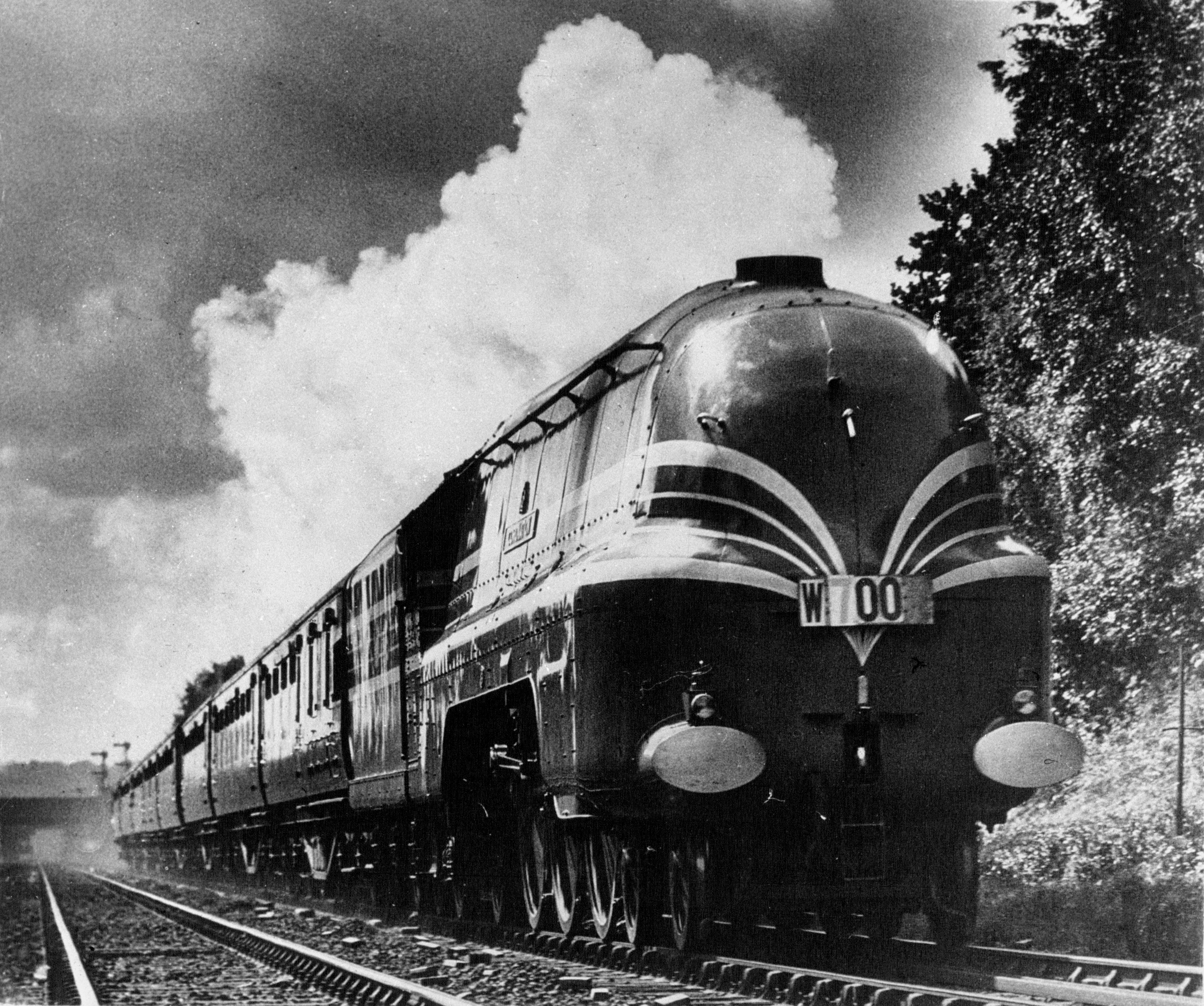
6220 Coronation, in as-built streamlined condition, blue livery.

The LMS Coronation Class No. 6220 (British Railways No. 46220) Coronation was a British steam locomotive.

== Overview ==
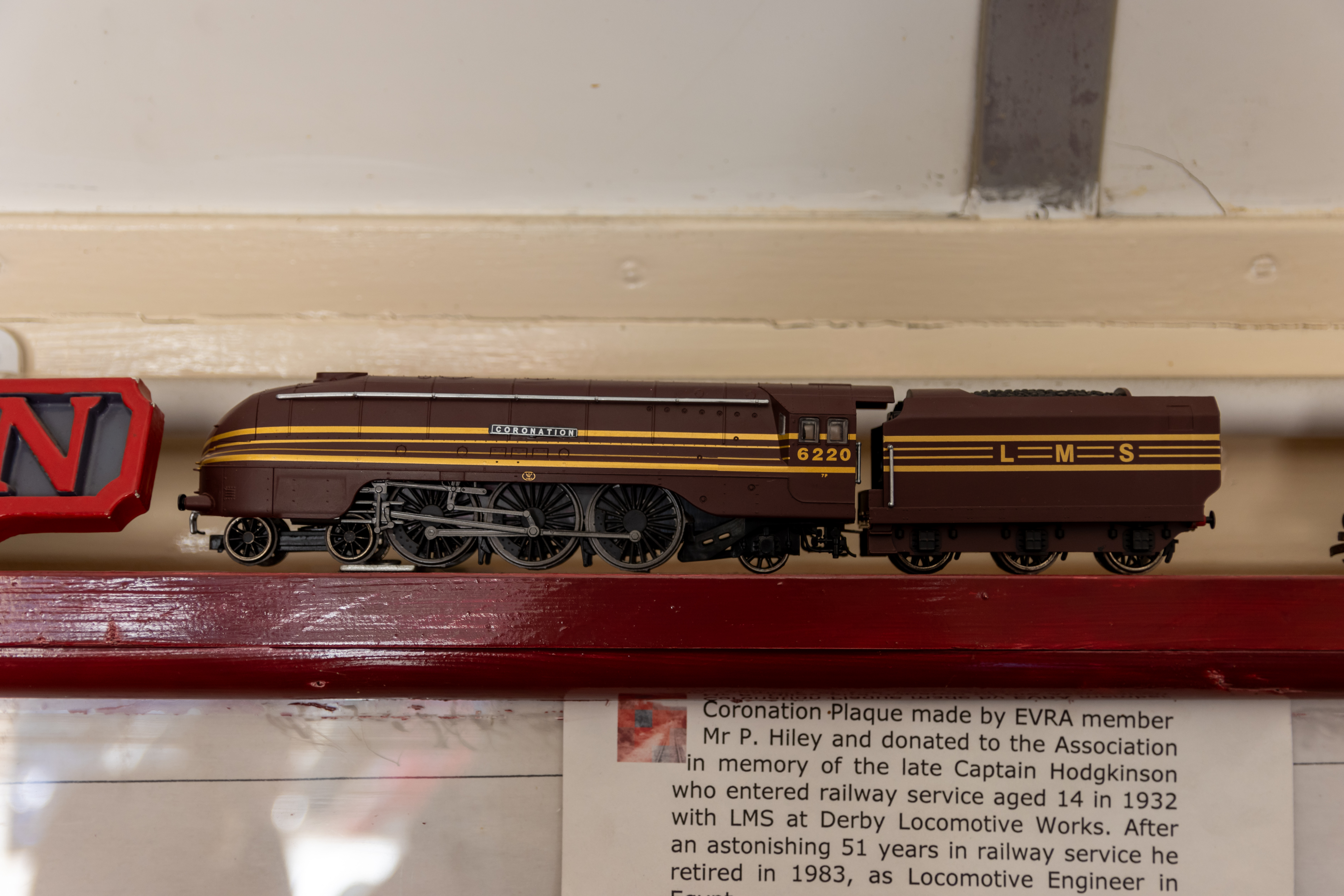
Model at Ecclesbourne Valley Railway

6220 was built in 1937 at Crewe Works, the first of its class of streamlined locomotives. It, along with others were given a special livery of Caledonian Railway blue with go-faster stripes instead of the more conventional red.

During a press run on 29 June 1937, 6220 set a new speed record on the West Coast Main Line. Driver TJ. Clark and fireman C. Lewis (with Robert Riddles (engineer) and inspector S. Miller on the footplate), pushed the Stanier pioneer to a claimed speed of 114 mph (183 km/h) on Madeley Bank south of Crewe, which broke the previous record of 113 mph (182 km/h) set by the rival LNER.

However, the celebration was premature, as the footplate team realised the train was still making 110 mph (180 km/h) only 1.5 mi (2.4 km) from Crewe station. Urgent braking improved matters, but the locomotive passed through the station's reverse curves at 57 mph (92 km/h), well in excess of the 20 mph (32 km/h) limit; the lurching alarmed the passengers and knocked loose various dishes and utensils in the dining coach.

Though the record now lay with the LMS, the scare led to both companies declaring an unofficial truce. This was only broken the following year by the LNER with A4 Class 4468 Mallard, which reached 126 mph (203 km/h) whilst trialling a new quick action braking system.

In 1939, 6220 temporarily swapped identities with 6229 Duchess of Hamilton. The new Coronation was sent on a tour to America for the World's fair. There was thus a blue 6229 Duchess of Hamilton (6220) in Great Britain and a red 6220 Coronation (6229) in the United States. On the return of the engine from North America, their identities were swapped back again.

6220 swapped its single chimney for a double chimney in December 1944. The streamlining was removed for maintenance reasons in September 1946, and smoke deflectors were installed during maintenance after the destruction of World War 2. It was painted LMS 1946 black livery in September 1947, followed by BR standard express blue from January 1950 to April 1952. It was painted BR green in April 1952. 46220 remained in semi-streamlined form with sloping smokebox front until February 1957 when a round-topped smokebox was fitted. 46220 was never painted maroon and was in BR green when withdrawn 46220 was later withdrawn from pulling passenger trains and mixed goods in 1963 and scrapped at Crewe Works.

== Bibliography ==
- Bellwood, John; Jenkinson, David (1986). Gresley and Stanier. London: H.M.S.O. OCLC 1256258927.
- Haresnape, Brian (1989). Railway Liveries 1923 - 1947. Shepperton: Ian Allan. ISBN 0-7110-1829-4. OCLC 1412560505.
- Nock, O.S. (1971). Speed Records on British Railways. Newton Abbot: David & Charles. ISBN 0-7153-5342-X.
- Nock, O.S. (1985). British Locomotives of the 20th Century, Volume 2 1930-1960. Cambridge: Book Club Associates. ISBN 0-85059-596-7.
- Roden, Andrew (1 October 2015). The Duchesses: the story of Britain's ultimate steam locomotives. Aurum Press. ISBN 978-1-78131-497-5.
