= LMS Jubilee Class =

Class of British steam locomotives

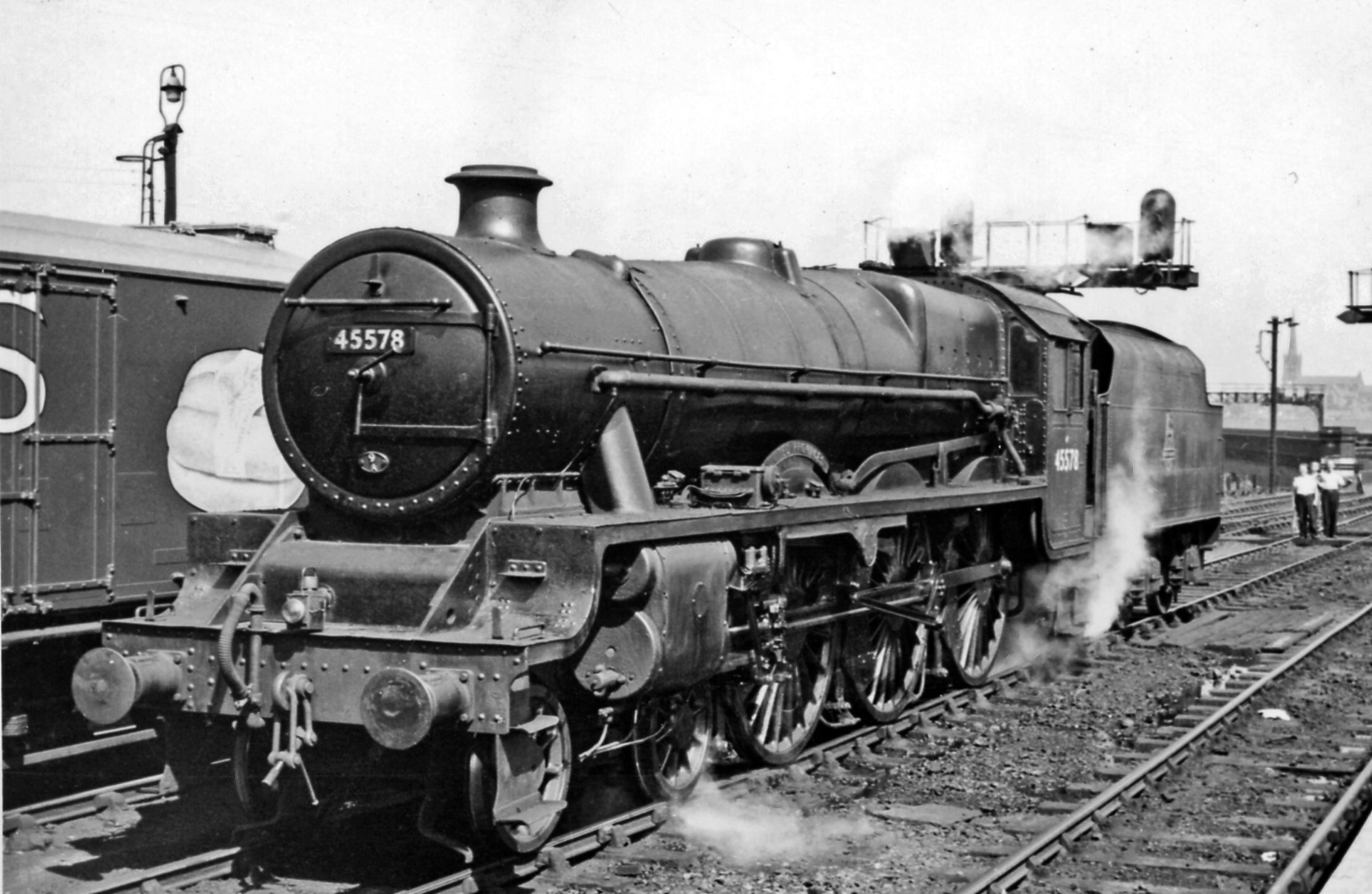
- 45578 United Provinces at Stockport in 1957.
Type and origin
- Power type: Steam
- Designer: William Stanier
- Builder: LMS Crewe Works - (131); LMS Derby Works - (10); North British Loco - (50)
- Order number: LMS Lot nos. 97, 112, 113, 118, 121, 129
- Build date: 1934–1936
- Total produced: 191
Specifications
- Configuration
  - Whyte: 4-6-0
  - UIC: 2′C h3
- Gauge: 4 ft 8 1/2 in (1,435 mm)
- Leading dia.: 3 ft 3 1/2 in (1.003 m)
- Driver dia.: 6 ft 9 in (2.057 m)
- Length: 64 ft 8 3/4 in (19.73 m)
- Loco weight: 79.55 long tons (89.10 short tons; 80.83 t)
- Tender weight: 54.65 long tons (61.21 short tons; 55.53 t)
- Fuel type: Coal
- Fuel capacity: 9 long tons (10 short tons; 9.1 t)
- Water cap.: 3,500 imp gal (16,000 L; 4,200 US gal) Fowler tender - 4,000 imp gal (18,000 L; 4,800 US gal) Stanier tender
- Firebox
  - Grate area: 29 1/2 or 31 sq ft (2.74 or 2.88 m^{2})
- Boiler: LMS type 3A
- Boiler pressure: 225 psi (1.55 MPa)
- Heating surface
  - Firebox: 162 or 181 sq ft (15.1 or 16.8 m^{2})
  - Tubes and flues: 1,372 to 1,470 sq ft (127.5 to 136.6 m^{2})
- Superheater
  - Heating area: 228 to 331 sq ft (21.2 to 30.8 m^{2})
- Cylinders: Three
- Cylinder size: 17 in × 26 in (432 mm × 660 mm)
- Valve gear: Walschaerts
- Valve type: Piston valves
Performance figures
- Tractive effort: 26,610 lbf (118.4 kN)
Career
- Operators: London, Midland and Scottish Railway, British Railways
- Power class: LMS: 5XP; BR (pre-1955): 6P; BR (post-1955) 6P5F (never displayed on cabsides)
- Numbers: LMS: 5552–5742; BR: 45552–45742
- Nicknames: Red Staniers, Jubes
- Axle load class: BR: Route Availability 8
- Withdrawn: 1952 (1), 1960–1967
- Disposition: Four preserved, remainder scrapped
- For the details of the two rebuilt locomotives, see LMS Rebuilt Jubilee Class

The London, Midland and Scottish Railway (LMS) Jubilee Class is a class of steam locomotive designed for main line passenger work. 191 locomotives were built between 1934 and 1936. They were built concurrently with the similar looking LMS Stanier Class 5 4-6-0. They were nicknamed Red Staniers (due to their crimson liveries) and Jubs.

== History ==
The last five locomotives of Henry Fowler's Patriot class on order, 5552 to 5556, were built with William Stanier's taper boiler and so became the first of the Jubilee class. 113 locomotives were ordered straight from the drawing board. They were initially a disappointment; their moderate degree of superheating often left them short of steam. Changes to the blastpipe and chimney dimensions helped to transform them.

On 29 April 1935 no. 5552, the first of the class, permanently swapped identities with no. 5642 which had been named Silver Jubilee on 19 April 1935 in recognition of the Silver Jubilee of King George V on 6 May of that year. This change gave the name to the rest of the class, see LMS Jubilee Class 5552 Silver Jubilee. Earlier on (from summer 1934), they had been known as the "Red Staniers" (because of the crimson livery), to distinguish them from the "Black Staniers" (the LMS Stanier Class 5 4-6-0 class). These engines were named after former Commonwealth states and countries of the British Empire, British naval commanders and admirals, and notable Royal Navy ships. Two (45732 and 45733) were named after participating locomotives in the Rainhill Trials.

Until the late 1950s, Jubilees were the largest express engine normally found on the lines running out of St Pancras. They practically monopolized the role of the main express engine, with the occasional Royal Scot popping up, or radiating from Derby. They could nevertheless be found on main lines throughout the former LMS system. They were also regarded as a powerful upgrade from both of the older Compound 4-4-0 locomotives, both the MR 1000 Class and the LMS Compound 4-4-0 as well. The Jubilees were a rather common sight on the Midland Main Line, the West Coast Main Line, and the Settle-Carlisle line, but were eventually displaced by the much more powerful Royal Scots during the 1940s.

The power classification was 5XP, in common with the earlier Patriot class. In January 1951 the classification was revised to 6P and in November 1955 to 6P5F but this change was not applied to the locomotives' cabsides, which continued to show 6P.

Five members of the class were fitted with a double chimney at different times. 5684 Jutland was the first, fitted with a double Kylchap in 1937. The double chimney did improve the power of the locos and also improved the coal consumption. It only carried this fitment for one year. 5742 Connaught was the next, being fitted with a plain double exhaust in 1940 which it carried until 1955. 5553 Canada was also fitted in 1940 but carried the double chimney for a short time. 5735 Comet and 5736 Phoenix were rebuilt with a 2A taper boiler and double chimney in 1942 to become the Rebuilt Jubilee Class. These two one-offs were have said to be a direct upgrade in performance in both power and steaming abilities from the non-rebuilt Jubilees, and similar in performance to the Rebuilt Patriot Class, however they were 3 tons heavier than the non-rebuilds, thus limiting their route availability. They were to have been the prototypes for the rebuilding of the entire class but were, in the end, the only Jubilees so to be treated. (They were reclassified 6P in July 1943, and 7P in 1951). As part of experiments at the Rugby Locomotive Testing Station, no. 45722 Defence was fitted with a double chimney from 1956 to 1957. In 1961 a double exhaust was fitted to no. 45596 Bahamas which carried it through withdrawal and into preservation.

=== Construction ===
Although built over only a three-year period the class had many variations due to improvements being made as they were built. The major differences were:

- Boilers – 10 variations, mainly affecting the number of tubes. The earlier boilers were domeless but later boilers were domed. There were two sizes of fire grate area depending on whether the firebox throatplate was straight or sloping.
- Bogies – Approximately 50 of the earlier locomotives were built with ex-Claughton bogies which had a 6 ft 3 in wheelbase compared to the later locomotives built with new bogies that had a wheelbase of 6 ft 6 in.
- Smokebox Saddle – The first 113 locomotives were built with a two-piece saddle; the rest had a conventional one-piece saddle.
- Tenders – Four basic patterns were fitted; Fowler 3,500-gallon. Fowler high-sided (10 off), Stanier 4,000-gallon and Stanier 3,500-gallon. These last tenders were difficult to identify, combining the high curved sides of the Stanier tender with the chassis from the earlier type Fowler tender. The easiest way to spot them is by the top row of horizontal rivets, slightly lower than on the 4,000-gallon version. However, taking into account rivets, wheelbase, and welds this can be subdivided into a total of eight patterns.

=== Performance ===
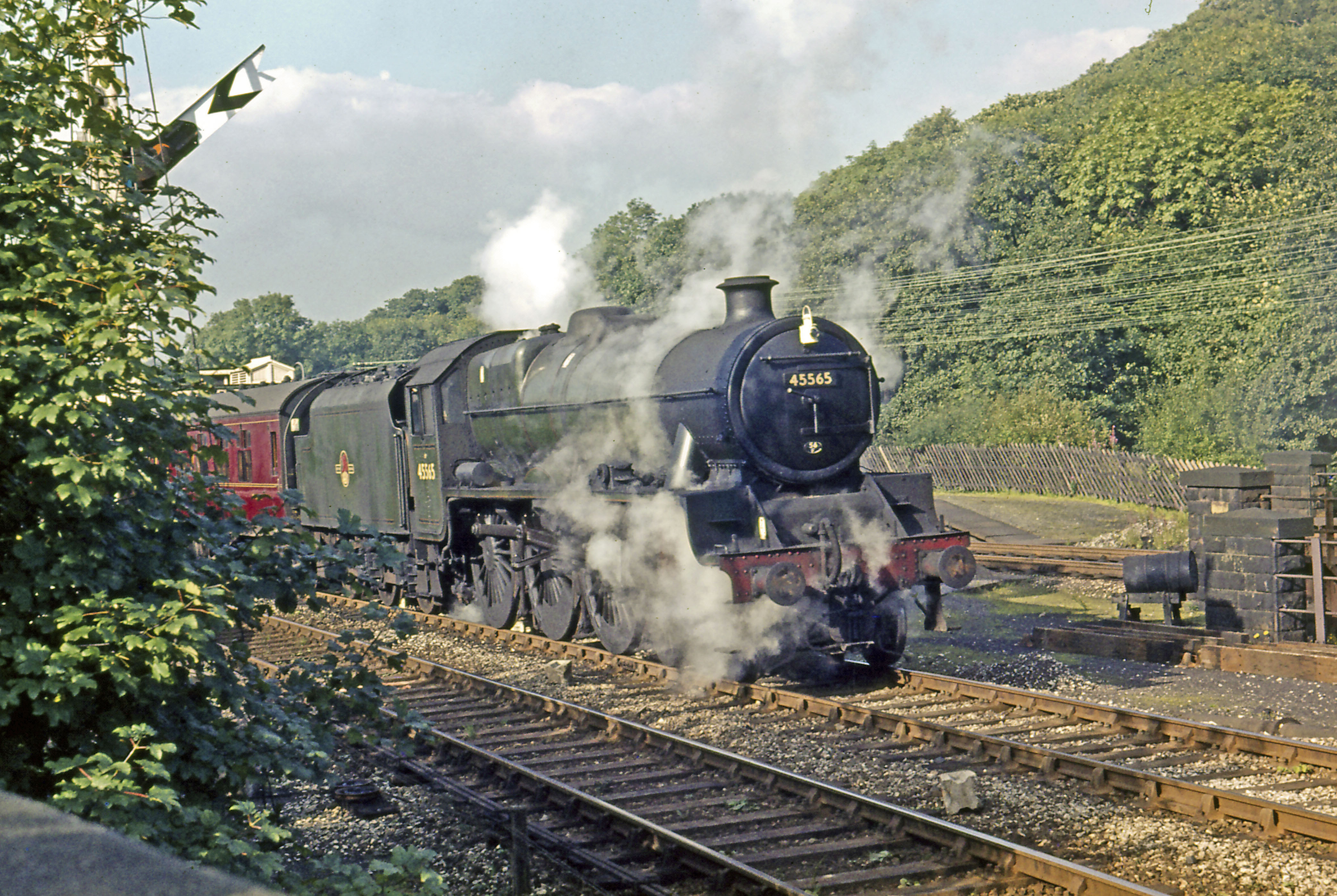
45565 Victoria leaves Dore and Totley station in June 1962

These locomotives had a mixed reception in their early years, but while their reputation did improve they never obtained the same praise as the Black 5s. When the original batch of 113 were built, engine crews found them disappointing, that they were poor steamers and that the older locomotives they were meant to replace often performed better. After several trials it was discovered that their blast pipe orifice was too wide and thus wasting steam. After this was resolved the class performed well the remainder of their careers.

=== Withdrawal ===
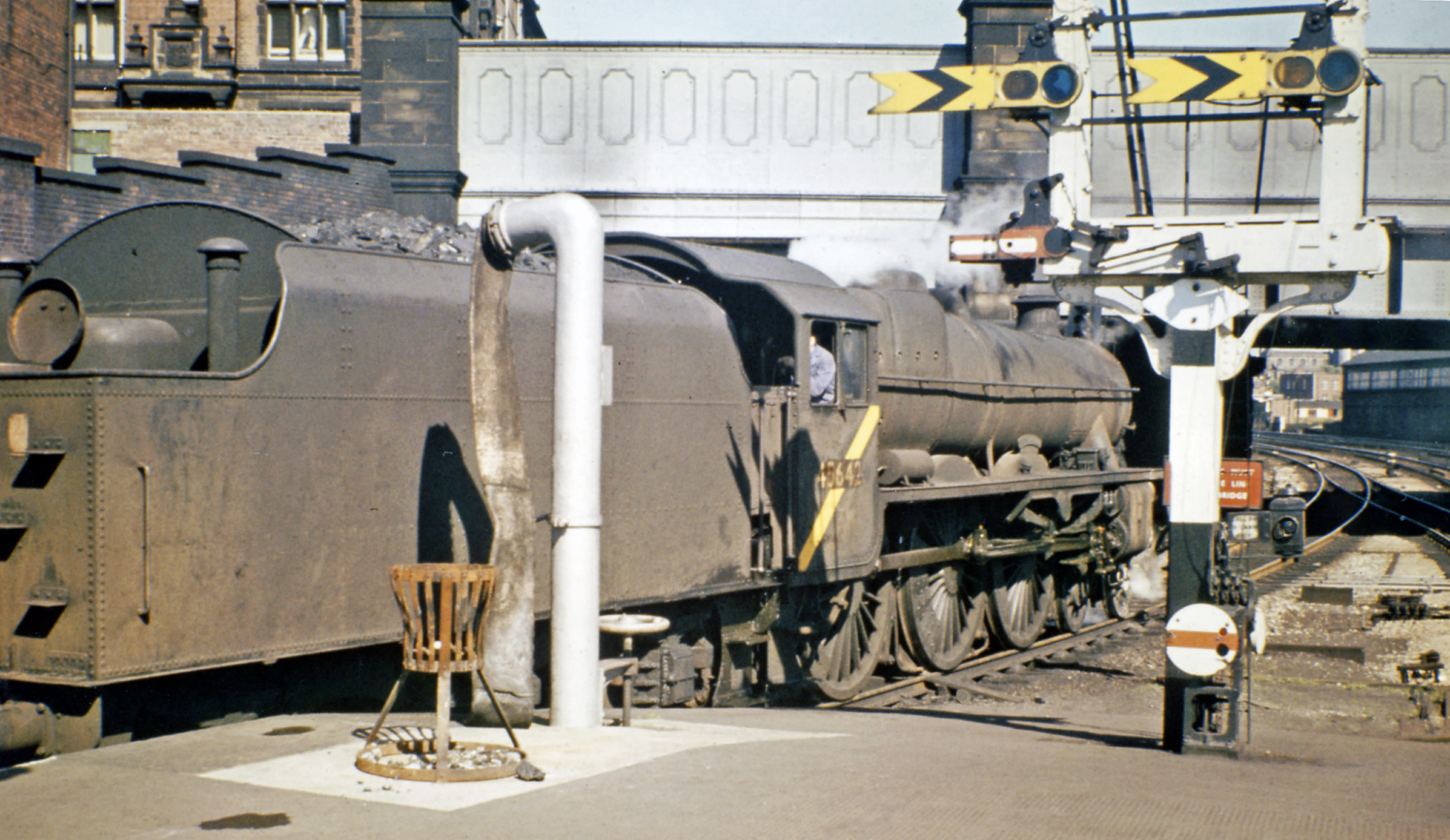
When the West Coast Main Line was partly electrified in 1964, several of the class were painted with a cabside yellow stripe forbidding operation south of Crewe, as shown by no. 45642 Boscawen.

No. 45637 Windward Islands was destroyed in the Harrow and Wealdstone accident in 1952, making it the first Jubilee engine to be scrapped. The remaining 188 locomotives were withdrawn between 1960 and 1967. The first of the standard withdrawals being 45609 Gilbert and Ellice Islands in September 1960 and the last engine to be withdrawn was No. 45562 Alberta from Leeds Holbeck shed (20A) on 4 November 1967. They were the last express engines from the Big Four days still in service.

Table of withdrawals
Year	Quantity in service at start of year	Total withdrawn	Withdrawn that year	Locomotive numbers	Notes
1952	189	1	1	45637	
1960	188	2	1	45609	
1961	187	5	3	45616/19/30	
1962	184	46	41	45559/66/70/76/82/87/94, 45603/07/15/21/28/36/51/56/62/65/73/77–79/83/86–88/91–93, 45707/11/13/15/18/20/22/24–25/27–29/31	
1963	143	77	31	45555/60/75/91, 45624–25/34/39/44–46/48–50/59/68–69/71/80, 45701–02/06/09/12/14/17/19/30/34/38/40	
1964	112	141	64	45552–54/56–58/61/64/68–69/71–72/77–80/83–85/92/98–99, 45601/05–06/10–14/17–18/20/22–23/31/35/38/40–41/57/63/70/72/74/76/81–82/85/89–90/95–96/99, 45700/03/08/10/16/23/32–33/37/41	45690, 45699 Preserved
1965	48	174	33	45563/67/73/86/88–90/95/97, 45600/02/04/08/26/29/32–33/42/52–53/55/58/61/64/66–67/84/98, 45704–05/21/26/42	
1966	15	181	7	45574/81/96, 45627/43/54/60	45596 Preserved
1967	8	189	8	45562/65/93, 45647/75/94/97, 45739	45593 Preserved

== Accidents and incidents ==
- On 21 January 1938, locomotive No. 5568 Western Australia was hauling an express passenger train which was in a head-on collision with an empty stock train at Oakley Junction due to a combination of driver and signalman's errors. Three people were killed and 46 were injured.
- On 11 October 1943, locomotive 5581 Bihar and Orissa hauling the Leeds - Edinburgh express collided with a freight train being shunted into sidings at Steeton, Yorkshire. No one was killed but four people were injured.
- On 18 May 1948, locomotives 5609 Gilbert and Ellice Islands (train loco) and 5605 Cyprus (pilot), hauling the 11:45 am down (St Pancras to Bradford) express were derailed, along with 8 coaches of a 12-coach train on a 30 ft high embankment near Wath Road Junction, Rotherham, Yorkshire. The cause was track distortion in hot weather. Poor track maintenance was a contributing factor. 8 people died and 56 were injured. Both locos were repaired at Derby Works and returned to service.
- On 8 October 1952, a three-train collision occurred at Harrow & Wealdstone station, Middlesex. Locomotive No. 45637 Windward Islands was one of two locomotives hauling an express passenger train which crashed into wreckage. A total of 112 people were killed and 340 were injured. This remains the worst peacetime rail crash in the United Kingdom. The locomotive was consequently scrapped due to damage sustained.
- On 16 August 1953, locomotive No. 45699 Galatea was hauling a passenger train which became divided and was derailed at Kingsbury, Warwickshire due to a combination of defects on the locomotive and the condition of the track.
- On 20 July 1959, locomotive No. 45730 Ocean overran a signal and consequently crashed into Dock Junction Signal Box, London. Trains had to be handsignalled into and out of St Pancras station for several days afterwards.
- On 17 January 1964, No. 45695 Minotaur was involved in a head-on collision with a mail train and a freight train. The locomotive was deemed to be uneconomical to repair and was withdrawn and scrapped off-site.

== Details ==
LMS No	BR No	Built	Works	Name	Date named	Withdrawn	Notes
5552	45552	1 Dec. 1934	Crewe	Silver Jubilee	17 April 1935	26 Sep. 1964	Renumbered from 5642 29 April 1935.
5553	45553	29 May 1934	Crewe	Canada	Mar. 1937	7 Nov. 1964	Fitted with double chimney in 1940 (same time as 5742) but soon removed.
5554	45554	5 Jun. 1934	Crewe	Ontario	Mar. 1936	7 Nov. 1964	
5555	45555	18 Jun. 1934	Crewe	Quebec	Feb. 1937	17 Aug. 1963	
5556	45556	22 Jun. 1934	Crewe	Nova Scotia	Mar. 1937	5 Sep. 1964	
5557	45557	29 Jun. 1934	North British	New Brunswick	Oct. 1936	19 Sep. 1964	
5558	45558	Jul. 1934	North British	Manitoba	Oct. 1936	Aug. 1964	
5559	45559	Jul. 1934	North British	British Columbia	Jan. 1937	Oct. 1962	
5560	45560	Jul. 1934	North British	Prince Edward Island	Sep. 1936	Nov. 1963	
5561	45561	Jul. 1934	North British	Saskatchewan	Jun. 1936	Sep. 1964	
5562	45562	Aug. 1934	North British	Alberta	Feb. 1936	Sep. 1967	Parts exist on preserved engine no 5699 Galatea.
5563	45563	Aug. 1934	North British	Australia	Jan. 1936	Nov. 1965	
5564	45564	Aug. 1934	North British	New South Wales	Jan. 1936	Jul. 1964	
5565	45565	Aug. 1934	North British	Victoria	Feb. 1936	Jan. 1967	
5566	45566	Aug. 1934	North British	Queensland	Apr. 1936	Nov. 1962	
5567	45567	Aug. 1934	North British	South Australia	Mar. 1936	Jan. 1965	
5568	45568	Aug. 1934	North British	Western Australia	Sep. 1936	Apr. 1964	
5569	45569	Aug. 1934	North British	Tasmania	Feb. 1936	Apr. 1964	
5570	45570	Aug. 1934	North British	New Zealand	Jan. 1936	Dec. 1962	
5571	45571	Sep. 1934	North British	South Africa	May 1936	May 1964	
5572	45572	Sep. 1934	North British	Irish Free State	Mar. 1936	Jan. 1964	
5572	45572	Sep. 1934	North British	Eire	Jul. 1938	Jan. 1964	
5573	45573	Sep. 1934	North British	Newfoundland	Feb. 1936	Sep. 1965	
5574	45574	Sep. 1934	North British	India	May 1936	Mar. 1966	
5575	45575	Sep. 1934	North British	Madras	Nov. 1937	Jun. 1963	
5576	45576	Sep. 1934	North British	Bombay	Dec. 1937	Dec. 1962	Stored prior to withdrawal.
5577	45577	Sep. 1934	North British	Bengal	Mar. 1937	Sep. 1964	
5578	45578	Sep. 1934	North British	United Provinces	Mar. 1938	May 1964	
5579	45579	Sep. 1934	North British	Punjab	Oct. 1936	Aug. 1964	
5580	45580	Oct. 1934	North British	Burma	Feb. 1938	Dec. 1964	
5581	45581	Oct. 1934	North British	Bihar and Orissa	Mar. 1938	Aug. 1966	
5582	45582	Nov. 1934	North British	Central Provinces	Oct. 1936	Dec. 1962	
5583	45583	Nov. 1934	North British	Assam	Jan. 1938	Oct. 1964	
5584	45584	Dec. 1934	North British	North West Frontier	Feb. 1938	Oct. 1964	
5585	45585	Dec. 1934	North British	Hyderabad	Jun. 1936	May 1964	
5586	45586	Dec. 1934	North British	Mysore	Apr. 1936	Jan. 1965	
5587	45587	Dec. 1934	North British	Baroda	May 1936	Dec. 1962	
5588	45588	Dec. 1934	North British	Kashmir	Oct. 1936	May 1965	
5589	45589	Dec. 1934	North British	Gwalior	Feb. 1936	Mar. 1965	
5590	45590	Dec. 1934	North British	Travancore	Jun. 1937	Dec. 1965	
5591	45591	Dec. 1934	North British	Udaipur	Apr. 1936	Oct. 1963	
5592	45592	Dec. 1934	North British	Indore	Jan. 1936	Sep. 1964	
5593	45593	Dec. 1934	North British	Kolhapur	May 1936	Oct. 1967	Preserved - last to be withdrawn.
5594	45594	Jan. 1935	North British	Bhopal	Mar. 1936	Dec. 1962	
5595	45595	Jan. 1935	North British	Southern Rhodesia	Feb. 1936	Jan. 1965	
5596	45596	12 Jan. 1935	North British	Bahamas	Jun. 1936	23 Jul. 1966	Preserved, fitted with double chimney in 1961.
5597	45597	Jan. 1935	North British	Barbados	Mar. 1936	Jan. 1965	
5598	45598	Feb. 1935	North British	Basutoland	Apr. 1936	Oct. 1964	
5599	45599	Jan. 1935	North British	Bechuanaland	Jul. 1936	Sep. 1964	
5600	45600	Feb. 1935	North British	Bermuda	Jun. 1936	Dec. 1965	
5601	45601	Apr. 1935	North British	British Guiana	Jul. 1936	Sep. 1964	
5602	45602	Apr. 1935	North British	British Honduras	May 1936	Mar. 1965	
5603	45603	May 1935	North British	Solomon Islands	Feb. 1936	Dec. 1962	
5604	45604	Mar. 1935	North British	Ceylon	May 1936	Jul. 1965	
5605	45605	Apr. 1935	North British	Cyprus	Jul. 1936	Feb. 1964	
5606	45606	Apr. 1935	North British	Falkland Islands	Sep. 1936	Jun. 1964	
5607	45607	Jun. 1934	Crewe	Fiji	Jul. 1936	Dec. 1962	
5608	45608	Jul. 1934	Crewe	Gibraltar	Mar. 1936	Sep. 1965	
5609	45609	Jul. 1934	Crewe	Gilbert and Ellice Islands	Sep. 1936	Sep. 1960	First 'normal' withdrawal.
5610	45610	Jul. 1934	Crewe	Gold Coast	Feb. 1936	Jan. 1964	
5610	45610	Jul. 1934	Crewe	Ghana	Dec. 1958	Jan. 1964	
5611	45611	Jul. 1934	Crewe	Hong Kong	Dec. 1936	Sep. 1964	
5612	45612	Jul. 1934	Crewe	Jamaica	Apr. 1937	Mar. 1964	
5613	45613	Aug. 1934	Crewe	Kenya	Mar. 1936	Sep. 1964	
5614	45614	Aug. 1934	Crewe	Leeward Islands	Jan. 1937	Jan. 1964	
5615	45615	Aug. 1934	Crewe	Malay States	Jun. 1936	Dec. 1962	
5616	45616	Aug. 1934	Crewe	Malta	Aug. 1936	Jan. 1961	
5616	45616	Aug. 1934	Crewe	Malta GC	Oct. 1943	Jan. 1961	
5617	45617	Sep. 1934	Crewe	Mauritius	Sep. 1937	Nov. 1964	
5618	45618	Oct. 1934	Crewe	New Hebrides	Mar. 1936	Feb. 1964	
5619	45619	Oct. 1934	Crewe	Nigeria	Apr. 1936	Aug. 1961	
5620	45620	Oct. 1934	Crewe	North Borneo	Mar. 1937	Sep. 1964	
5621	45621	Oct. 1934	Crewe	Northern Rhodesia	Jul. 1936	Dec. 1962	
5622	45622	Oct. 1934	Crewe	Nyasaland	Mar. 1936	Sep. 1964	
5623	45623	Oct. 1934	Crewe	Palestine	Dec. 1936	Jul. 1964	
5624	45624	Oct. 1934	Crewe	St. Helena	Jan. 1936	Nov. 1963	
5625	45625	Oct. 1934	Crewe	Sarawak	Nov. 1936	Sep. 1963	
5626	45626	Nov. 1934	Crewe	Seychelles	Apr. 1937	Oct. 1965	
5627	45627	Nov. 1934	Crewe	Sierra Leone	Apr. 1936	Sep. 1966	Preserved classmate 45699 Galatea presently running as 45627.
5628	45628	Nov. 1934	Crewe	Somaliland	Mar. 1936	Dec. 1962	
5629	45629	Nov. 1934	Crewe	Straits Settlements	Feb. 1937	May 1965	
5630	45630	Nov. 1934	Crewe	Swaziland	Apr. 1936	Nov. 1961	Withdrawn due to accident damage.
5631	45631	Nov. 1934	Crewe	Tanganyika	Jan. 1936	Aug. 1964	
5632	45632	Nov. 1934	Crewe	Tonga	Feb. 1936	Oct. 1965	
5633	45633	Nov. 1934	Crewe	Trans-Jordan	1936	Oct. 1965	
5633	45633	Nov. 1934	Crewe	Aden	Sep. 1946	Oct. 1965	
5634	45634	Nov. 1934	Crewe	Trinidad	May 1936	May 1963	
5635	45635	Nov. 1934	Crewe	Tobago	Jun. 1936	Sep. 1964	
5636	45636	Dec. 1934	Crewe	Uganda	Apr. 1936	Dec. 1962	
5637	45637	Dec. 1934	Crewe	Windward Islands	Mar. 1936	Dec. 1952	Destroyed in the Harrow and Wealdstone rail crash, 8 October 1952.
5638	45638	Dec. 1934	Crewe	Zanzibar	Apr. 1936	Mar. 1964	
5639	45639	Dec. 1934	Crewe	Raleigh	Jun. 1936	Sep. 1963	
5640	45640	Dec. 1934	Crewe	Frobisher	Mar. 1936	Mar. 1964	
5641	45641	Dec. 1934	Crewe	Sandwich	May 1936	Sep. 1964	
5642	45642	May. 1934	Crewe	Boscawen	Apr. 1936	Jan. 1965	Built as 5552, renumbered to 5642 29 Apr. 1935 with no name.
5643	45643	Dec. 1934	Crewe	Rodney	Oct. 1937	Jan. 1966	
5644	45644	Dec. 1934	Crewe	Howe	Nov. 1937	Nov. 1963	
5645	45645	Dec. 1934	Crewe	Collingwood	Sep. 1937	Oct. 1963	
5646	45646	Dec. 1934	Crewe	Napier	Sep. 1937	Dec. 1963	
5647	45647	Jan. 1935	Crewe	Sturdee	Apr. 1936	May 1967	
5648	45648	Jan. 1935	Crewe	Wemyss	Jun. 1936	Feb. 1963	
5649	45649	Jan. 1935	Crewe	Hawkins	May 1936	Oct. 1963	
5650	45650	Jan. 1935	Crewe	Blake	Feb. 1937	Jan. 1963	
5651	45651	Jan. 1935	Crewe	Shovell	Jan. 1936	Nov. 1962	
5652	45652	Jan. 1935	Crewe	Hawke	Jun. 1937	Jan. 1965	
5653	45653	Jan. 1935	Crewe	Barham	Apr. 1936	Apr. 1965	
5654	45654	Feb. 1935	Crewe	Hood	May 1936	Jun 1966	
5655	45655	Dec. 1934	Derby	Keith	Jun. 1937	Apr. 1965	
5656	45656	Dec. 1934	Derby	Cochrane	Mar. 1936	Dec. 1962	
5657	45657	Dec. 1934	Derby	Tyrwhitt	Feb. 1936	Sep. 1964	
5658	45658	Dec. 1934	Derby	Keyes	Jan. 1936	Sep. 1965	This locomotive spent the whole of its life at Leeds Holbeck, 10 Feb. 1935 to Sept 1965.
5659	45659	Dec. 1934	Derby	Drake	Mar. 1936	May 1963	
5660	45660	Dec. 1934	Derby	Rooke	1936	Jun. 1966	
5661	45661	Dec. 1934	Derby	Vernon	Feb. 1936	May 1965	
5662	45662	Dec. 1934	Derby	Kempenfelt	Sep. 1936	Nov. 1962	
5663	45663	Jan. 1935	Derby	Jervis	Apr. 1937	Oct. 1964	
5664	45664	Jan. 1935	Derby	Nelson	Apr. 1936	May 1965	
5665	45665	Nov. 1935	Crewe	Lord Rutherford of Nelson	Nov. 1935	Dec. 1962	Double row nameplate.
5666	45666	Nov. 1935	Crewe	Cornwallis	1937	Apr. 1965	
5667	45667	Nov. 1935	Crewe	Jellicoe	Feb. 1937	Jan. 1965	
5668	45668	Dec. 1935	Crewe	Madden	Feb. 1937	Dec. 1963	
5669	45669	Dec. 1935	Crewe	Fisher	Jan. 1937	Jun. 1963	
5670	45670	Dec. 1935	Crewe	Howard of Effingham	Mar. 1937	Oct. 1964	
5671	45671	Dec. 1935	Crewe	Prince Rupert	Mar. 1937	Nov. 1963	Became something of a celebrity engine and 'pet' of Newton Heath in its latter days, owing to it being fitted with the only high superheat 28 element boiler made for the class.
5672	45672	Dec. 1935	Crewe	Anson	Mar. 1937	Nov. 1964	
5673	45673	Dec. 1935	Crewe	Keppel	Mar. 1937	Dec. 1962	
5674	45674	Dec. 1935	Crewe	Duncan	Apr. 1937	Oct. 1964	
5675	45675	Dec. 1935	Crewe	Hardy	Mar. 1937	June 1967	
5676	45676	Dec. 1935	Crewe	Codrington	May 1937	Sep. 1964	
5677	45677	Dec. 1935	Crewe	Beatty	Mar. 1937	Dec. 1962	
5678	45678	Dec. 1935	Crewe	De Robeck	Mar. 1937	Dec. 1962	
5679	45679	Dec. 1935	Crewe	Armada	Jun. 1937	Dec. 1962	
5680	45680	Dec. 1935	Crewe	Camperdown	Dec. 1935	Jan. 1963	Loaned to the LNER in 1946.
5681	45681	Dec. 1935	Crewe	Aboukir	Dec. 1935	Sep. 1964	
5682	45682	Jan. 1936	Crewe	Trafalgar	Jan. 1936	Jun. 1964	
5683	45683	Jan. 1936	Crewe	Hogue	Jan. 1936	Dec. 1962	
5684	45684	Feb. 1936	Crewe	Jutland	Feb. 1936	Dec. 1965	Fitted with Kylchap double exhaust in 1937, removed 1938.
5685	45685	Jan. 1936	Crewe	Barfleur	Jan. 1936	Mar. 1964	
5686	45686	Feb. 1936	Crewe	St. Vincent	Feb. 1936	Nov. 1962	
5687	45687	Feb. 1936	Crewe	Neptune	Feb. 1936	Dec. 1962	
5688	45688	Feb. 1936	Crewe	Polyphemus	Feb. 1936	Dec. 1962	
5689	45689	Feb. 1936	Crewe	Ajax	Mar. 1936	Dec. 1964	
5690	45690	Mar. 1936	Crewe	Leander	Mar. 1936	Mar. 1964	Preserved.
5691	45691	Mar. 1936	Crewe	Orion	Mar. 1936	Dec. 1962	
5692	45692	Mar. 1936	Crewe	Cyclops	Mar. 1936	Dec. 1962	
5693	45693	Mar. 1936	Crewe	Agamemnon	Mar. 1936	Dec. 1962	
5694	45694	Mar. 1936	Crewe	Bellerophon	Mar. 1936	Jan. 1967	
5695	45695	Mar. 1936	Crewe	Minotaur	Mar. 1936	scrapped Feb.1964 beyond repair after collision with mail train and freight train on Jan 17th 1964	
5696	45696	Apr. 1936	Crewe	Arethusa	Apr. 1936	Jul. 1964	
5697	45697	Apr. 1936	Crewe	Achilles	Apr. 1936	Sep. 1967	
5698	45698	Apr. 1936	Crewe	Mars	Apr. 1936	Oct. 1965	
5699	45699	Apr. 1936	Crewe	Galatea	Apr. 1936	Nov. 1964	Preserved.
5700	45700	Apr. 1936	Crewe	Britannia	Apr. 1936	Jul. 1964	Ran nameless from Feb. to Sep. 1951.
5700	45700	Apr. 1936	Crewe	Amethyst	Sep. 1951	Jul. 1964	Ran nameless from Feb. to Sep. 1951.
5701	45701	Apr. 1936	Crewe	Conqueror	Apr. 1936	Feb. 1963	Shedded at Newton Heath all its life.
5702	45702	May 1936	Crewe	Colossus	May 1936	Apr. 1963	
5703	45703	May 1936	Crewe	Thunderer	May 1936	Nov. 1964	
5704	45704	May 1936	Crewe	Leviathan	May 1936	Jan. 1965	
5705	45705	May 1936	Crewe	Seahorse	May 1936	Nov. 1965	
5706	45706	May 1936	Crewe	Express	May 1936	Sep. 1963	
5707	45707	May 1936	Crewe	Valiant	May 1936	Dec. 1962	
5708	45708	Jun. 1936	Crewe	Resolution	Jun. 1936	Feb. 1964	
5709	45709	Jun. 1936	Crewe	Implacable	Jun. 1936	Nov. 1963	Damaged by enemy action 10 Oct. 1940.
5710	45710	Jun. 1936	Crewe	Irresistible	Jun. 1936	Jun. 1964	
5711	45711	Jun. 1936	Crewe	Courageous	Jun. 1936	Dec. 1962	
5712	45712	Jun. 1936	Crewe	Victory	Jun. 1936	Nov. 1963	
5713	45713	Jun. 1936	Crewe	Renown	Jun. 1936	Oct. 1962	
5714	45714	Jun. 1936	Crewe	Revenge	Jun. 1936	Jul. 1963	
5715	45715	Jul. 1936	Crewe	Invincible	Jul. 1936	Dec. 1962	
5716	45716	Jul. 1936	Crewe	Swiftsure	Jul. 1936	Sep. 1964	
5717	45717	Jul. 1936	Crewe	Dauntless	Jul. 1936	Oct. 1963	
5718	45718	Jul. 1936	Crewe	Dreadnought	Jul. 1936	Oct. 1962	
5719	45719	Aug. 1936	Crewe	Glorious	Aug. 1936	Mar. 1963	
5720	45720	Aug. 1936	Crewe	Indomitable	Aug. 1936	Dec. 1962	
5721	45721	Aug. 1936	Crewe	Impregnable	Aug. 1936	Oct. 1965	
5722	45722	Aug. 1936	Crewe	Defence	Aug. 1936	Dec. 1962	Rugby Test Plant locomotive, 1956.
5723	45723	Aug. 1936	Crewe	Fearless	Aug. 1936	Aug. 1964	
5724	45724	Sep. 1936	Crewe	Warspite	Sep. 1936	Nov. 1962	
5725	45725	Sep. 1936	Crewe	Repulse	Sep. 1936	Dec. 1962	
5726	45726	Oct. 1936	Crewe	Vindictive	Oct. 1936	Mar. 1965	
5727	45727	Oct. 1936	Crewe	Inflexible	Oct. 1936	Dec. 1962	
5728	45728	Oct. 1936	Crewe	Defiance	Oct. 1936	Oct. 1962	
5729	45729	Oct. 1936	Crewe	Furious	Oct. 1936	Oct. 1962	
5730	45730	Oct. 1936	Crewe	Ocean	Oct. 1936	Oct. 1963	
5731	45731	Oct. 1936	Crewe	Perseverance	Oct. 1936	Oct. 1962	
5732	45732	Oct. 1936	Crewe	Sanspareil	Oct. 1936	Feb. 1964	
5733	45733	Nov. 1936	Crewe	Novelty	Nov. 1936	Sep. 1964	
5734	45734	Nov. 1936	Crewe	Meteor	Nov. 1936	Dec. 1963	
5735	45735	Nov. 1936	Crewe	Comet	Nov. 1936	Oct. 1964	Rebuilt with type 2A boiler and double chimney in May 1942.
5736	45736	Nov. 1936	Crewe	Phoenix	Nov. 1936	Sep. 1964	Rebuilt with type 2A boiler and double chimney in April 1942.
5737	45737	Nov. 1936	Crewe	Atlas	Nov. 1936	May 1964	
5738	45738	Nov. 1936	Crewe	Samson	Nov. 1936	Dec. 1963	
5739	45739	Dec. 1936	Crewe	Ulster	Dec. 1936	Jan. 1967	This loco carried a small red hand above the nameplates for a short time.
5740	45740	Dec. 1936	Crewe	Munster	Dec. 1936	Oct. 1963	
5741	45741	Dec. 1936	Crewe	Leinster	Dec. 1936	Feb. 1964	
5742	45742	Dec. 1936	Crewe	Connaught	Dec. 1936	May 1965	Fitted with double chimney between 1940 and 1955.

== Preservation ==
Four Jubilees have been preserved, two each built by Crewe Works and by North British. 45593 and 45596 were purchased directly from BR for preservation. The other two were rescued from Woodham Brothers. All four have operated in preservation and all have run on the main line.

As of 2026 one member of the class is operational and mainline certified: 45699 Galatea. In May 2024 David Smith of West Coast Railways confirmed that he had purchased 45593 Kolhapur and that the locomotive was moving to Carnforth for overhaul at a future date, while 45690 Leander was about to undertake an overhaul. 45596 Bahamas was withdrawn for overhaul in October 2025.

A large number of parts were taken from sister engine 45562 Alberta, which was the subject matter of a few preservation attempts, one of them even tried to persuade Sir Billy Butlin to buy it, that failed before she was scrapped in 1968 and most parts exist on preserved sister engine Galatea.

Note: Marked names indicate that the loco is not presently wearing them. Loco numbers in bold mean their current number.

Number		Name	Builder	Built	Withdrawn	Service Life	Location	Owners	Livery	Condition	Mainline Certified	Dual Braked	Photograph	Notes
LMS	BR	Name	Builder	Built	Withdrawn	Service Life	Location	Owners	Livery	Condition	Mainline Certified	Dual Braked	Photograph	Notes
**5593**	45593	Kolhapur	North British Locomotive Company	Dec. 1934	Oct. 1967	32 Years, 10 months	Carnforth MPD	David Smith	LMS Crimson Lake	Awaiting Overhaul.	No	No		Formerly owned by Tyseley. Bought by David Smith in May 2024.
5596	**45596**	Bahamas	North British Locomotive Company	Jan. 1935	Jul. 1966	31 Years, 6 months	Keighley and Worth Valley Railway	Bahamas Locomotive Society	BR Green, Late Crest	Under Overhaul. Boiler ticket expires: 2027.	No (2019 – 2025)	Yes		Only preserved Jubilee fitted with a double chimney. Withdrawn from traffic for overhaul in October 2025 & due to be fitted with air brakes during overhaul.
5690	**45690**	Leander	Crewe Works	Mar. 1936	Mar. 1964	28 Years	Carnforth MPD	Chris Beet	BR Black, Early Emblem	Awaiting Overhaul. Boiler ticket expired: 12 May 2024.	No (2014 – 2023)	No		Black nameplate on fireman's side and red nameplate on driver's side.
5699	45699 (**45627**)	Galatea (Sierra Leone)	Crewe Works	Apr. 1936	Nov. 1964	28 Years, 7 months	Carnforth MPD	David Smith	BR Green, Late Crest	Operational. Boiler ticket expires: Jan 2033.	Yes (2023 – Ongoing)	No		Presently disguised as scrapped classmate 45627 Sierra Leone. Returned to service in Jan 2023 working first test run in Feb 2023.

== Model railways ==
Mainline Railways' catalogue included OO gauge LMS Jubilees with Fowler tenders in 1983; in LMS crimson, BR green and BR lined black liveries. Mainline also had a limited availability of other OO gauge Jubilee 5XPs the same year; an LMS crimson model of Leander and a BR green model of Orion. In early 2008, Bachmann introduced a OO gauge model of 45611 Hong Kong in BR green livery. Graham Farish have produced various British N gauge Jubilee models, including (in 2013) 5664 Nelson in LMS crimson and 45572 Eire in British Railways lined green with late crest.
