= Silver Jubilee National Service of Thanksgiving =

Silver Jubilee National Service of Thanksgiving may refer to:

- The service of thanksgiving held at St Paul's Cathedral to mark the Silver Jubilee of George V in 1935
- The service of thanksgiving held at St Paul's Cathedral to mark the Silver Jubilee of Elizabeth II in 1977
