= Clock Tower, Sukkur =

Clock tower in Sukkur, Pakistan

- گھنٽا گھر، سکر
- Interactive map of the Clock Tower, Sukkur area
- Alternative names: Ghanta Ghar

General information
- Type: Clock tower
- Location: Sukkur, Sindh, Pakistan
- Coordinates: 27°41′40″N 68°51′51″E
- Opened: 1937

Height
- Height: 90 ft.

Clock Tower, Sukkur, also known as Ghanta Ghar, Sukkur,(Sindhi: گھنٽا گھر، سکر) (Urdu: گھنٹہ گھر، سکھر) is a clock tower located in Sukkur, Sindh. The tower is 90-feet high.

== History ==
Clock Tower, Sukkur was constructed by a Hindu businessman, Seth Wadho Mal Nebhau Mal Manjhari, at the Silver Jubilee of George V. The clock tower was inaugurated in 1937 by UM Mirchandani, the then Collector of Sukkur.

In 1994, its four clocks were stolen by an unknown person.
