= LMS Jubilee Class 5596 Bahamas =

Preserved British steam locomotive

LMS 5596 Bahamas
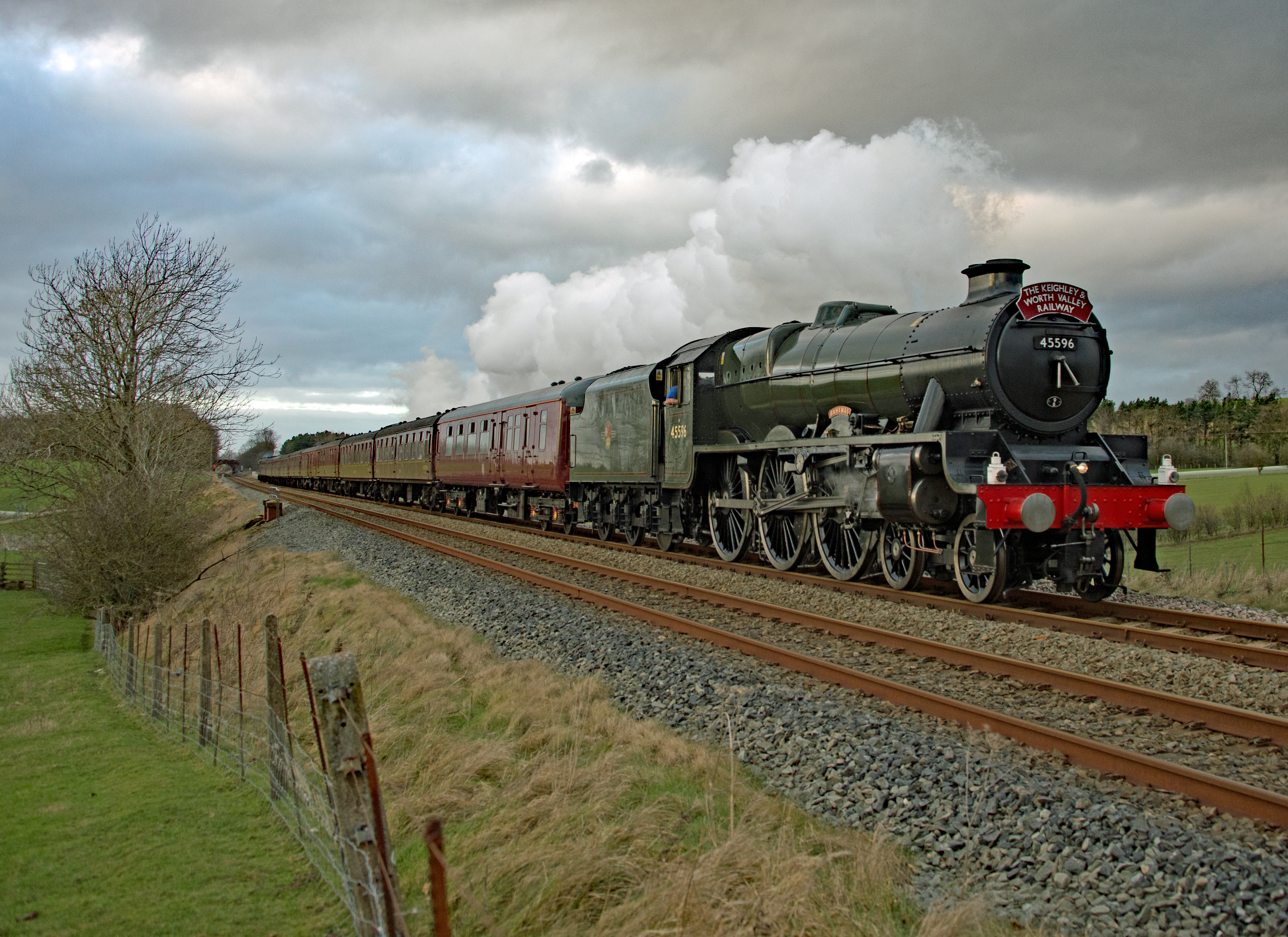
- 45596 Bahamas on the Settle-Carlisle Line in 2019
Type and origin
- Power type: Steam
- Designer: William Stanier
- Builder: North British Locomotive Company, Glasgow
- Order number: L885
- Build date: December 1934
Specifications
- Configuration
  - Whyte: 4-6-0
  - UIC: 2′C h3
- Gauge: 4 ft 8 1/2 in (1,435 mm)
- Leading dia.: 3 ft 3 1/2 in (1.003 m)
- Driver dia.: 6 ft 9 in (2.057 m)
- Length: 64 ft 8 3/4 in (19.73 m)
- Loco weight: 79.55 long tons (89.10 short tons; 80.83 t)
- Tender weight: 54.65 long tons (61.21 short tons; 55.53 t)
- Fuel type: Coal
- Fuel capacity: 9.0 long tons (10.1 short tons; 9.1 t)
- Water cap.: 4,000 imp gal (18,000 L; 4,800 US gal)
- Firebox
  - Grate area: 29 1/2 or 31 sq ft (2.74 or 2.88 m^{2})
- Boiler: LMS type 3A
- Boiler pressure: 225 psi (1.55 MPa)
- Heating surface
  - Firebox: 162 or 181 sq ft (15.1 or 16.8 m^{2})
  - Tubes and flues: 1,372 to 1,470 sq ft (127.5 to 136.6 m^{2})
- Superheater
  - Heating area: 228 to 331 sq ft (21.2 to 30.8 m^{2})
- Cylinders: Three
- Cylinder size: 17 in × 26 in (432 mm × 660 mm)
- Valve gear: Walschaerts
- Valve type: Piston valves
Performance figures
- Maximum speed: 75 mph (121 km/h) certified
- Tractive effort: 26,610 lbf (118.4 kN)
Career
- Power class: LMS: 5XP; BR: 6P
- Numbers: LMS: 5596; BR: 45596
- Axle load class: BR: Route Availability 8
- Withdrawn: Jul 1966
- Disposition: Under Overhaul

London, Midland and Scottish Railway (LMS) Jubilee Class 5596 (BR number 45596) Bahamas is a preserved British steam locomotive. It is named after The Bahamas.

The locomotive was built as a standard LMS Jubilee Class by the North British Locomotive Company in 1934. In May 1961, under the ownership of British Railways, Bahamas was the recipient of several experimental modifications aimed at improving the steam engine. In July 1966, Bahamas was withdrawn from traffic. A preservation society was founded and raised the money to purchase it from British Rail to prevent it from being scrapped. After repairs by the Hunslet Engine Company in Leeds Bahamas was transported to Dinting Railway Museum, near Glossop, Derbyshire.

After British Rail's ban on steam locomotives ended, Bahamas was permitted to run on the national rail network. In October 1972, Bahamas hauled its first excursion special, proving there was public demand. A year later, it was removed from service when its boiler certificate expired. In 1988, it returned to steam after overhaul. It was withdrawn from mainline use after its ticket expired. Between 1997 and 2013, Bahamas alternated between public displays and storage. Another overhaul began during 2013 and the locomotive returned to mainline operations in early 2019.

== History ==
5596 was constructed in 1934 by the North British Locomotive Company in Glasgow for the London Midland & Scottish Railway (LMS). It was delivered by NBL on 26 December 1934, and entered traffic on 12 January 1935. It was a standard Jubilee Class locomotive, designed by William Stanier, the chief mechanical engineer of the LMS. In June 1936, 5596 received the name Bahamas after the islands in the Atlantic Ocean which were part of the British Empire.

Following the nationalisation of Britain's railway companies in January 1948 Bahamas, which had become the property of British Railways, was renumbered to 45596, and transferred to Edge Hill, Liverpool.

In May 1961, Bahamas was modified during a scheduled overhaul to participate in a trial being conducted with the aim of improving the performance and extending the service life of steam locomotives. Changes made included installing a double blastpipe and exhaust system which brought a 30 percent increase in the boiler's steaming capacity and allowed the locomotive the ability to steam more efficiently poorer quality coal. Before this, another Jubilee, 45722 Defence, had received similar design changes for testing in the late 1950s; the role of Bahamas was to provide an assessment on the day-to-day impact of such alterations.

On its return to traffic, Bahamas was based at Carlisle for a brief period, before being transferred to Stockport in July 1962. By 1962, enthusiasm had waned for the development of improved steam locomotives and trials were terminated by the end of the year. In July 1966, Bahamas was withdrawn from traffic; in its final months, it had been used to haul farewell excursions for enthusiasts. Following its withdrawal, the locomotive was stored while officials deliberated on the best means to dispose of it. For some time, it lingered on the scrap line while the manner of its disposal was considered.

Keen to save Bahamas, several members of the public came together to attempt to purchase it with the hope of using the locomotive to operate special excursion trains. British Rail showed a lack of enthusiasm when it was approached by the preservation society as the group encountered great difficulty in raising the funds. In early 1967, British Rail had agreed the sale of Bahamas to a scrap merchant in Hull. The society acquired enough money, largely due to the offer of a sympathetic businessman of a £3,000 loan to cover the purchase and high-level intervention within British Rail resulted in the sale to the Bahamas Locomotive Society.

== Allocations ==
The shed locations of 45596 on particular dates.

January 1935 (First shed)	Crewe, 5A
?	Preston, 10B
April 1947	Bristol Barrow Road, 22A
September 1947	Crewe, 5A
August 1948	Edge Hill, 8A
September 1950	Huddersfield, 25B
January 1957	Edge Hill, 8A
? 1961	Carlisle (Upperby), 12A
July 1962 (Last Shed)	Stockport, 9B
July 1966	Withdrawn
July 1966 – January 1967	Stored at Stockport
January 1967	Purchased for preservation

== Bahamas Locomotive Society ==
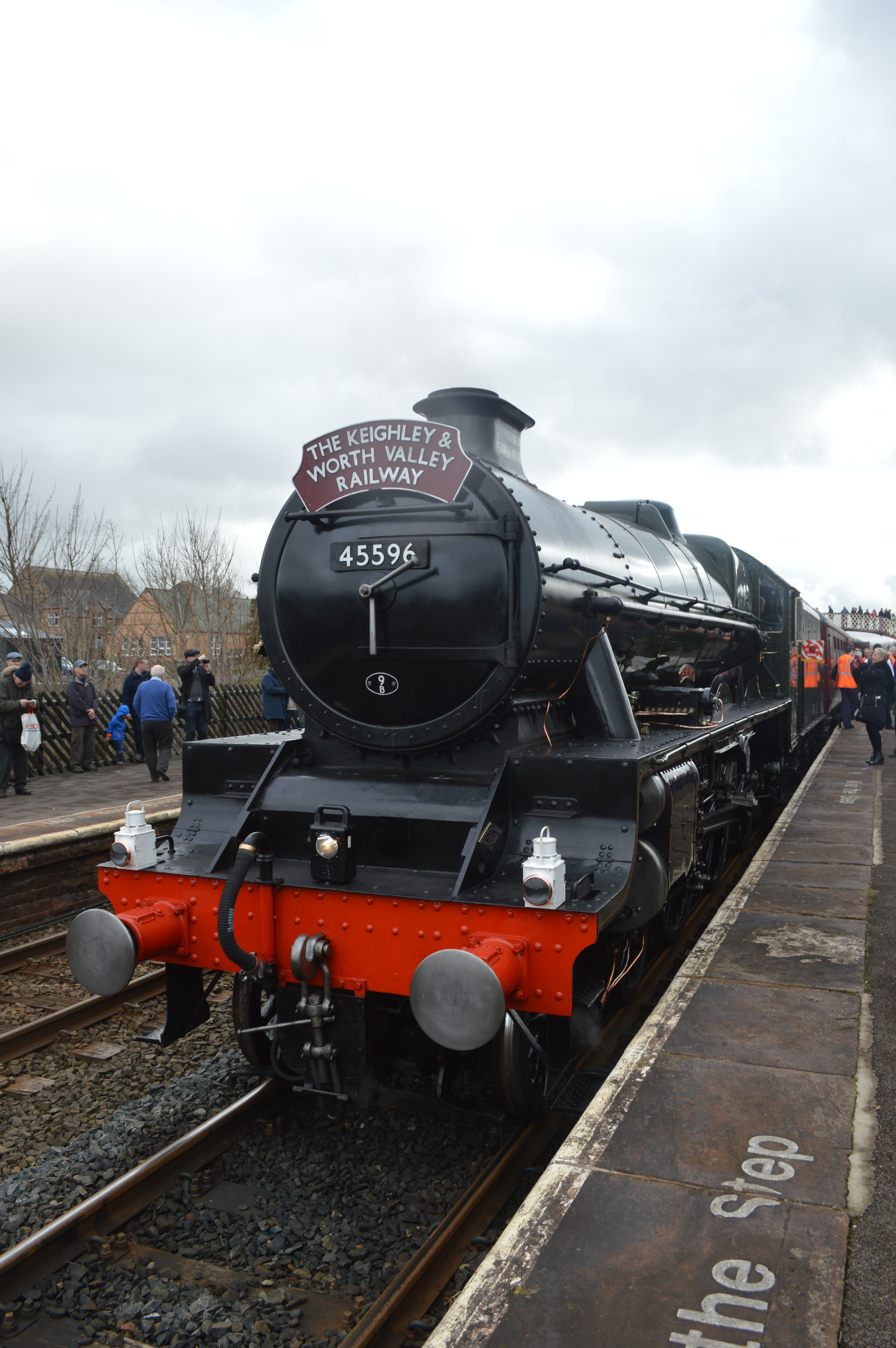
Bahamas at Appleby while working "The Bahamas Renaissance II"

In 1967, Bahamas was purchased from British Railways for preservation by the Bahamas Locomotive Society. After purchase the engine was sent to the Hunslet Engine Company in Leeds for repairs and was repainted in LMS Crimson lake livery. The society secured the lease of a section of track to Dinting railway station near Glossop in Derbyshire where it established the Dinting Railway Museum around a former Great Central steam shed. This was the engine's first operational base in its preservation years.

In the early years of preservation, British Rail did not allow access to the rail network because of a ban on steam locomotives. The ban was lifted in 1971 and Bahamas was one of several locomotives selected to run on the national railway network. The locomotive hauled an enthusiasts' special in October 1972. Public demand for such excursions was proved and more excursions were run by preservation groups. Bahamas was taken out of service in 1973 due to the expiry of its boiler certificate.

The society began overhauling the locomotive and its boiler to return it to mainline-running condition. During this overhaul the livery was returned to the British Rail green scheme it had worn in regular service (this was authentic for its double chimney). Once the overhaul was completed in 1988, it returned to mainline excursion trips and occasional visits to other heritage railways.

In 1990, the Bahamas Locomotive Society relocated to Ingrow West railway station near Keighley in West Yorkshire. In 1994 the engine's mainline certification expired, with the engine spending the next 3 years running on heritage railways until its 10-year boiler ticket expired at the end of 1997. For the better part of the following fifteen years, Bahamas spent much of its time being moved between storage and static display at locations such as the Keighley and Worth Valley Railway's museums at Ingrow and Oxenhope as well as the National Railway Museum in York.

Since 2018, the Bahamas Locomotive Society has been chaired by Alderman Keith Whitmore.

In Sept 2022 to mark the 40th anniversary of the Falklands War in 1982, 45596 had a temporary change in identity to become scrapped classmate 45606 Falkland Islands.

Following the expiry of its mainline certificate in September 2025, Bahamas was withdrawn from traffic in October 2025 for an overhaul. To permit 45596 to operate with both air and vacuum stock, the locomotive is being fitted with air brakes during the overhaul.

=== Return to steam in the 21st century ===
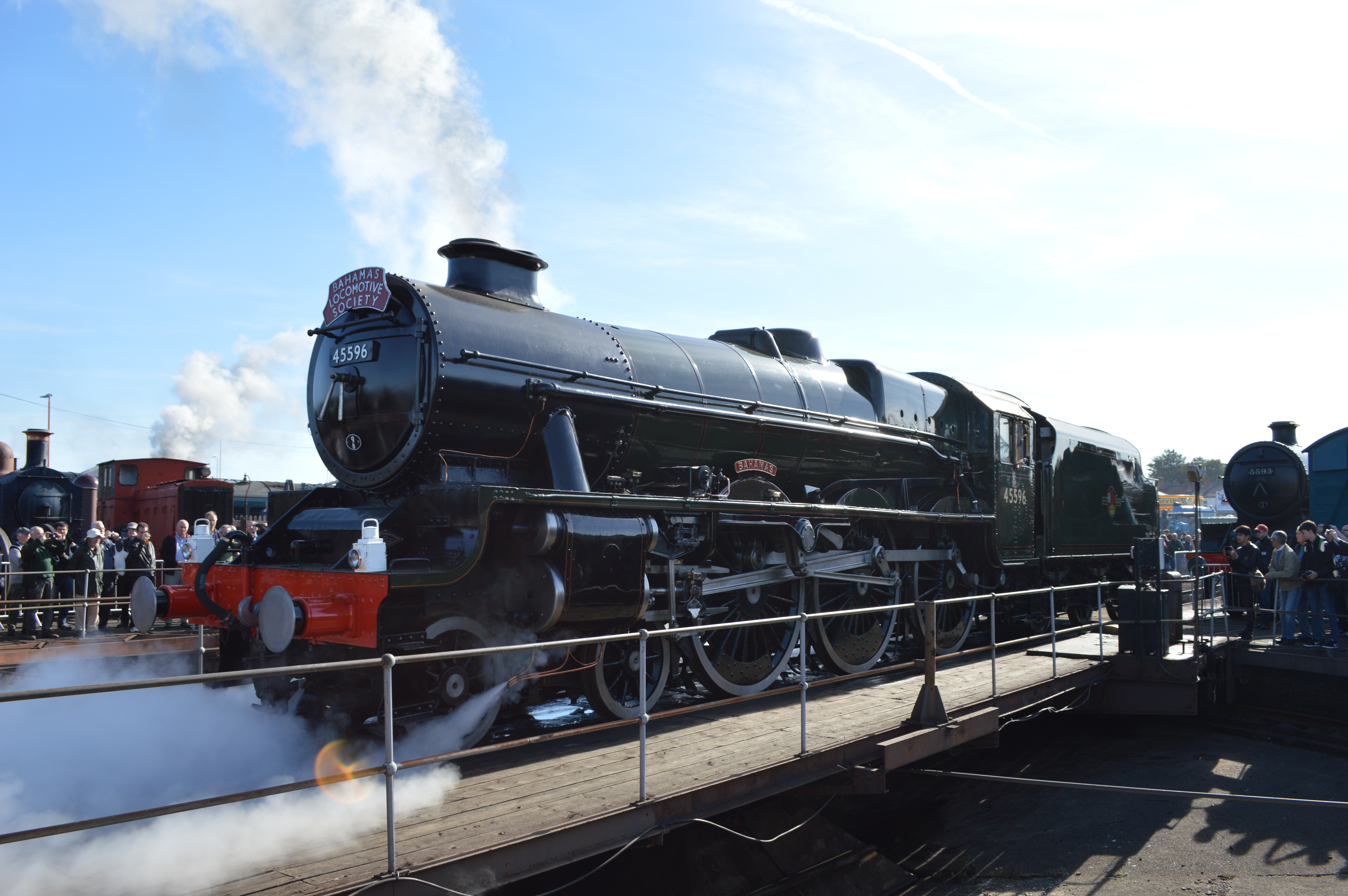
The newly overhauled and returned to service Jubilee No. 45596 Bahamas reversing off the turntable at Tyseley Locomotive Works

In January 2011, an appeal, "Steam's Last Blast", was launched to raise funds for another overhaul to modern main line standards. Sufficient funds were raised from supporters and with the aid of a Heritage Lottery Fund (HLF) grant of £775,800.

In July 2013, work commenced on a major boiler overhaul to mainline standard at Tyseley Locomotive Works in Birmingham with the aim of returning it to traffic during 2017/2018. The engine made its first moves and appearance at the Tyseley at 50 open weekend in Sept 2018 and once work completed in January 2019 alongside its light and loaded test runs the locomotive returned to the Keighley and Worth Valley Railway in February prior to mainline operations starting the same month. 45596 worked "The Bahamas Renaissance" its first railtour for 25 years on 9 February 2019, the tour originated at Oxenhope on the Keighley and Worth Valley Railway and ran both ways over the Settle and Carlisle line via Ribblehead and Appleby to Carlisle. Owing to popularity with the first tour being a complete sell-out. A second trip was run the weekend after, this being over the same route and the same itinerary. This tour also became a complete sell-out.

=== The Greatest Gathering ===
In February 2025, it was announced that 45596 was to appear at The Greatest Gathering which was taking place from Friday 1 to Sunday 3 August 2025 at Derby Litchurch Lane Works as part of the rail 200 celebrations to celebrate 200 years of railways and the opening of the Stockton and Darlington Railway in 1825.

45596 Bahamas was one of two jubilee's to attend the event as classmate No. 45699 'Galatea' was also chosen to attend the event. The BLS's second operational locomotive LNWR Webb Coal Tank, No. 1054 also appeared at event being placed on display in steam on the works own turntable.
