= Tyseley Locomotive Works =

Railway museum in Birmingham, England

Coordinates: 52.4544°N 1.8455°W

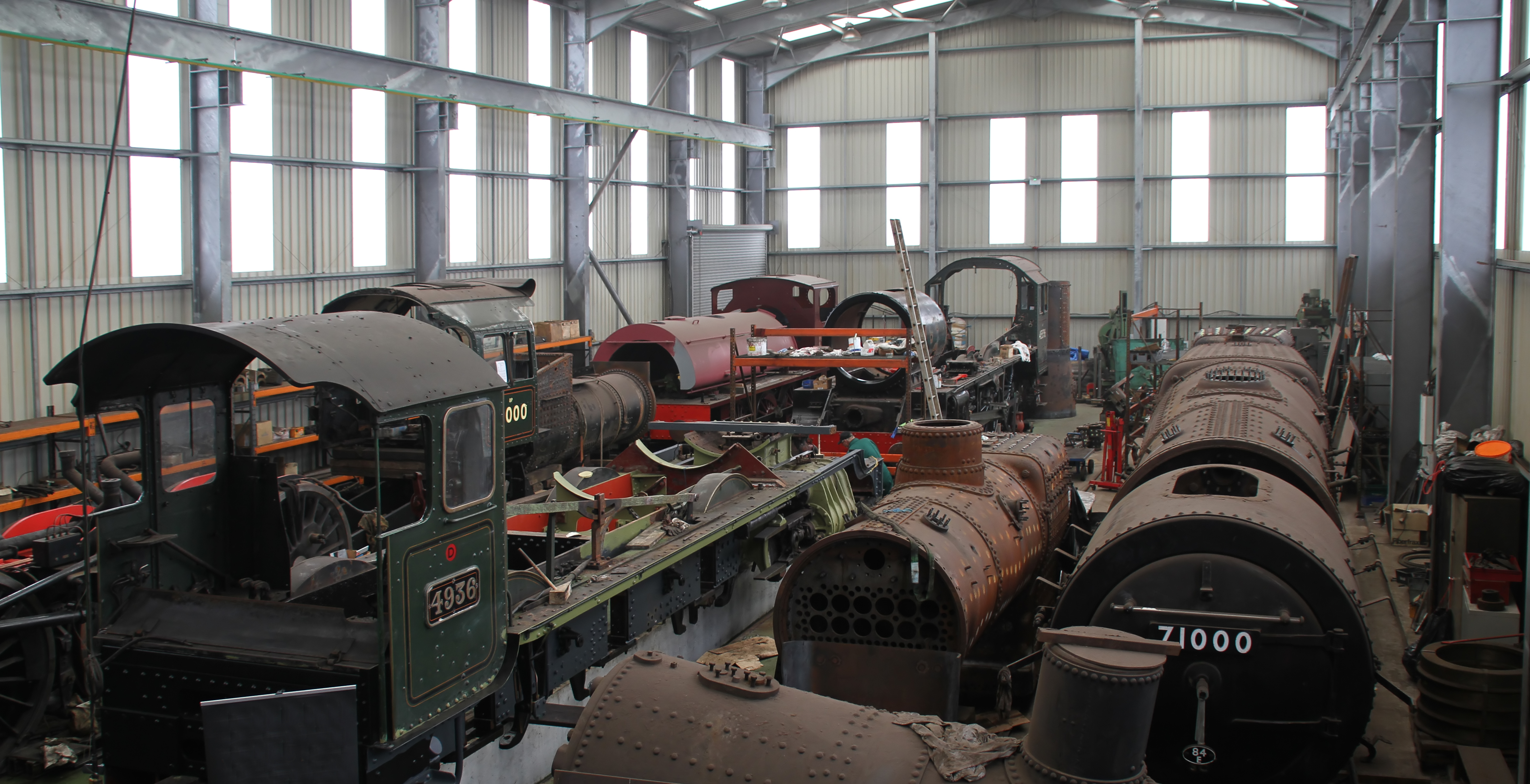
4936 Kinlet Hall, 71000 Duke of Gloucester and various other locomotives pictured at varying stages of overhaul in the main shed at Tyseley Locomotive Works

Tyseley Locomotive Works, formerly the Birmingham Railway Museum, is the engineering arm of mainline railtour operator Vintage Trains, based in Birmingham, England. It occupies part of the former Great Western Railway's Tyseley depot. It is home to an extensive collection of steam engines, from small industrial builds to Great Western Railway 'Castles' and 'Halls', and large ex-mainline diesel engines.

== Background ==
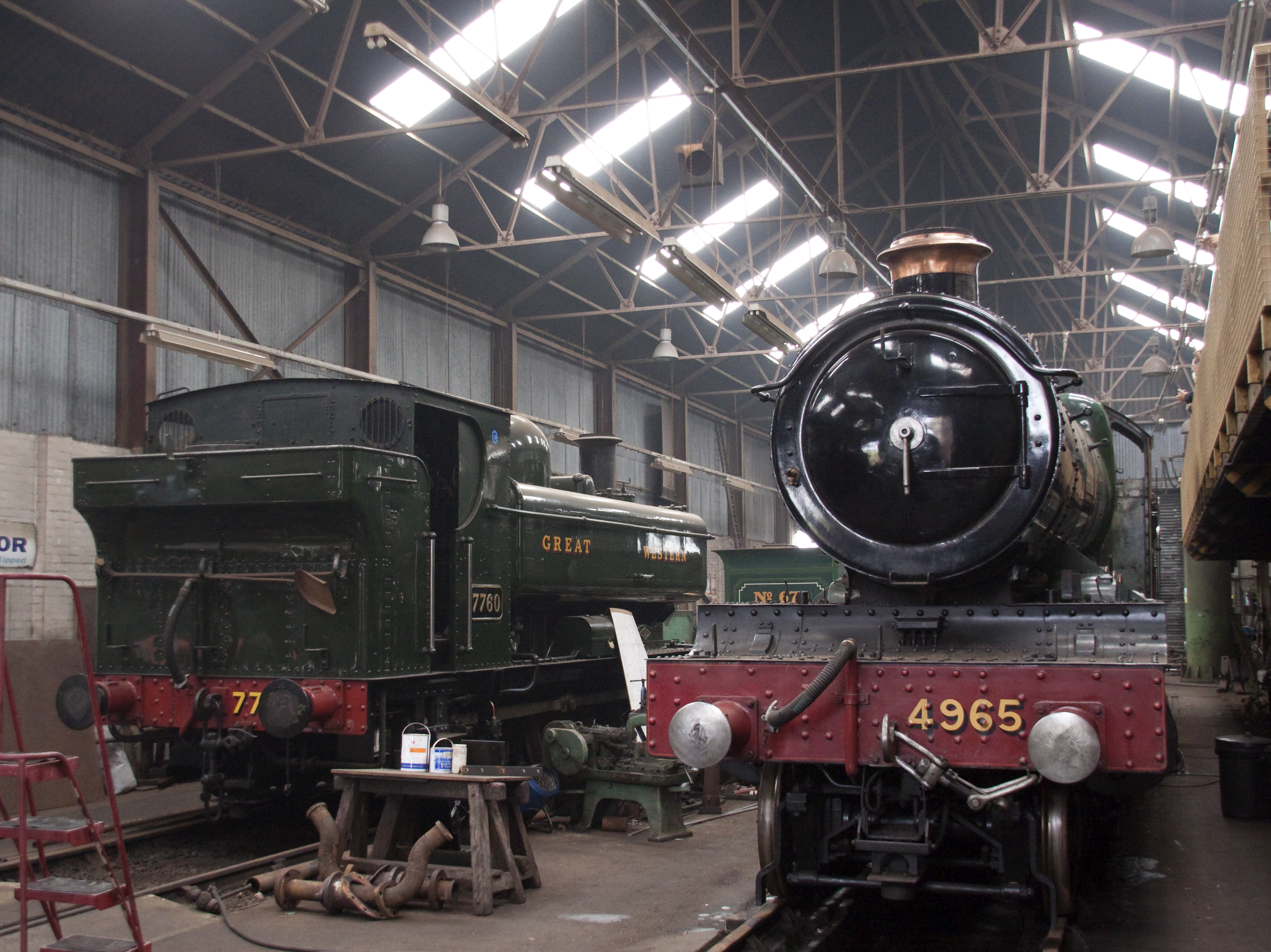
4965 and 7760 inside the main shed at Tyseley

Following the purchase of GWR Castle Class No.7029 Clun Castle in January 1966 by Patrick Whitehouse, the locomotive needed a base close to its central West Midlands supporters' base. Whitehouse found space available at Tyseley, on the site of the former GWR depot, and formed 7029 Clun Castle Ltd to own both the locomotive and the rights to stable it at the depot.

In October 1968, 7029 Clun Castle Ltd purchased LMS Jubilee Class No.5593 "Kolhapur". With further locomotives and railway artefacts available as a result of the Beeching Axe, the supporters established the Standard Gauge Steam Trust as a registered educational charity, to preserve and demonstrate the steam locomotives. Following negotiations the trust acquired a long-term lease on a large part of the Tyseley site, and established the Tyseley Collection which still owns the locomotives and artefacts via the limited company; the depot site became the "Birmingham Railway Museum".

The trust cleared buildings, repaired the dilapidated tracks and restored two water columns to allow steam locomotives to take water at the site. In 1968, the old coaling stage was converted into a two-road shed with an inspection pit to hold both acquired locomotives. In November 1966, Clun Castle was overhauled at the site.

In 1999 the trust achieved its long-held objective of running a regular steam train service on the national main line railway network: the Shakespeare Express between Birmingham Snow Hill and Stratford-upon-Avon. At this point the trust felt that the term museum was inappropriate for its new status, and hence separated its assets and operations into two new organisations, Tyseley Locomotive Works and the operating arm Vintage Trains, with the third arm remaining the Tyseley Collection. Since then, the restoration and maintenance of steam locomotives has been an ongoing process and long term goal.

== Operation ==
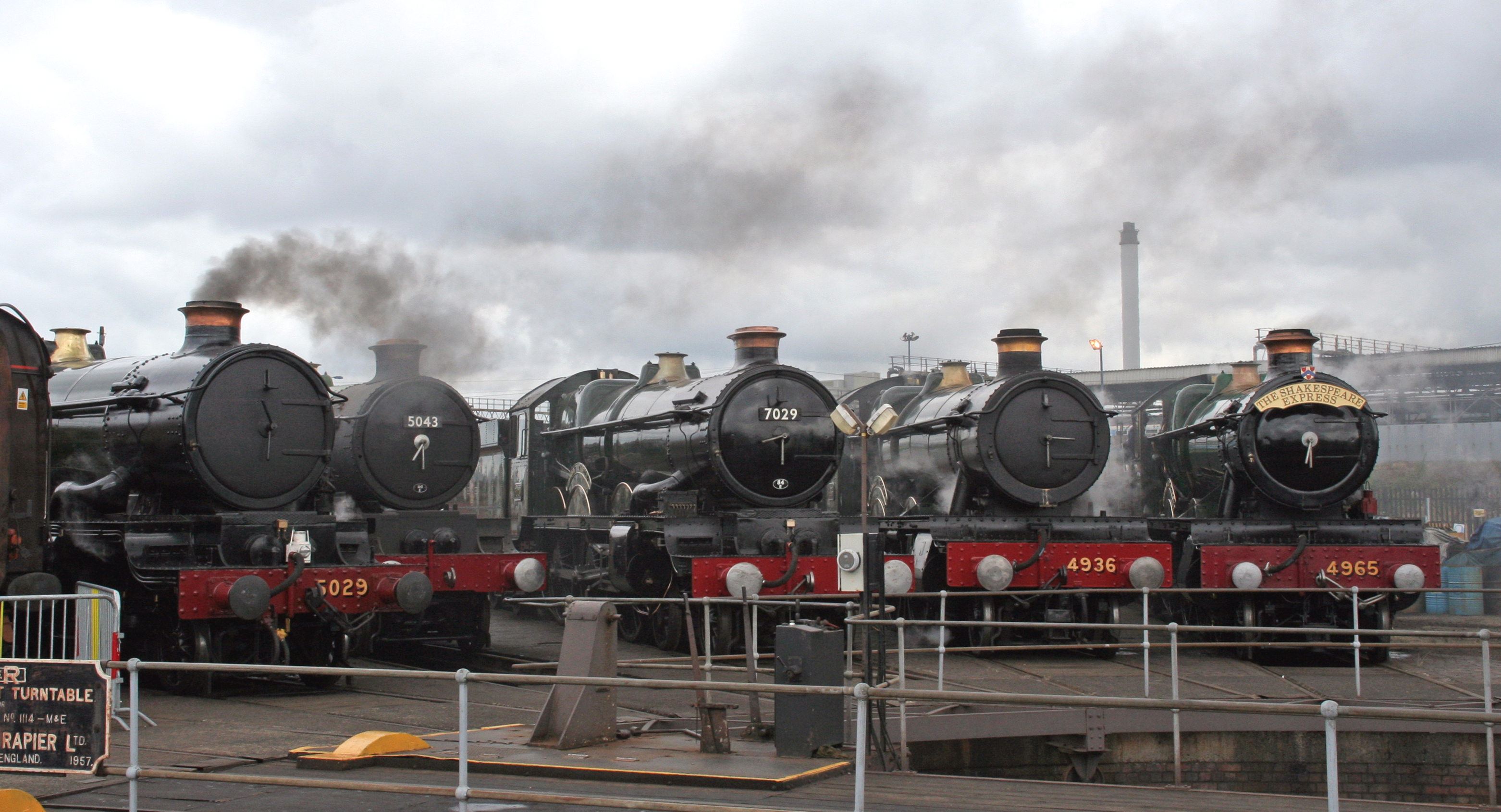
A fleet of ex-GWR locomotives positioned near the turntable at Tyseley.

Tyseley Locomotive Works stores, restores, overhauls and maintains Vintage Trains' fleet of steam and diesel locomotives for use hauling mainline railtours. It also undertakes contract work for third party companies, where their locomotives may be overhauled, restored or constructed using the locomotive works' facilities, this helps generate revenue to assist the works in upkeep costs and continued operation. One notable project to emerge from the works is that of 6880 Betton Grange, which was primarily constructed at TLW. Tours are also occasionally available, so that members of the public may tour the depot with a member of staff.

Vintage Trains also operates railtours using hired steam and diesel locomotives such as 45596 Bahamas and D1015 Western Champion. These 'guest' locomotives may use Tyseley Locomotive Works as a temporary operating base, but are not included in the listings below.

== Locomotives ==
=== Steam locomotives ===
Locomotives listed here form part of the Tyseley collection except where noted.

Image	Number	Name	Class	Wheel Configuration	Year built	Builder	Status	Notes
	2885	-	GWR 2884 Class	2-8-0	1938	Swindon Works	Undergoing Restoration	Privately owned
	4121	-	GWR 5101 Class	2-6-2T	1937	Swindon Works	Undergoing overhaul	Privately owned
	4965	Rood Ashton Hall	GWR 4900 Class	4-6-0	1930	Swindon Works	Awaiting Overhaul	
	5043	Earl of Mount Edgcumbe	GWR 4073 Class	4-6-0	1936	Swindon Works	Operational, Mainline Certified (2023-Ongoing)	Boiler ticket expires in 2031.
	5080	Defiant	GWR 4073 Class	4-6-0	1939	Swindon Works	Awaiting overhaul	Overhaul being done to mainline standard.
	7029	Clun Castle	GWR 4073 Class	4-6-0	1950	Swindon Works	Operational, Mainline Certified (2019-Ongoing)	Boiler ticket expires in 2027.
	7752	-	GWR 5700 Class	0-6-0PT	1930	North British Locomotive Co.	Awaiting Overhaul	
	9600	-	GWR 5700 Class	0-6-0PT	1945	Swindon Works	Awaiting Overhaul	
	1	Cadbury N01	-	0-4-0	1925	Avonside	Cosmetic Overhaul	
	1	-	Peckett W7	0-4-0	1941	Peckett & Sons	Awaiting Overhaul	
	670	-	LNWR Bloomer	2-2-2	20xx	Tyseley	Under Construction	Replica
	1	Sutton Belle	Moddified bassett-lowke Class 30	4-4-2	1933	Cannon Ironfoundries	Undergoing overhaul	15Inch Gauge
	2	Sutton Flyer	Moddified bassett-lowke Class 30	4-4-2	1952	Oldbury Foundry	Awaiting Overhaul	15Inch Gauge

=== Diesel locomotives ===
Loco numbers in bold mean their current number.

Pre-TOPS Number	TOPS Number	Class	Name	Livery	Owner	Status	Mainline Certified	Location	Photograph	Notes
D3029	**13029**	08	-	BR Black	Tyseley Locomotive Works	Operational	No	Tyseley		Site shunter.
D6940	**37240**	37	-	Transrail Grey	Tyseley Locomotive Works	Operational	Yes	Tyseley	37240 passes Barton-under-Needwood	Acquired in 2022.
**D1755**	**47773**	47	-	BR Two-Tone Green	Tyseley Locomotive Works	Operational	Yes	Tyseley		Repainted in May 2021.
D433	**50033**	50	Glorious	BR Blue Large Logo	Tyseley Locomotive Works	Operational	No	Kidderminster		On three year loan to the Fifty Fund.
4	-	-	-	Sutton Red	Tyseley Miniature Railway Project	Operational	No	Tyseley		15Inch Gauge

=== Former locomotives ===
- LMS Jubilee Class 5593 Kolhapur: sold to West Coast Railways and left in 2024.
- GWR 5700 Class 0-6-0PT No 7760: sold to a private buyer and left in 2024.
