= Barfleur (disambiguation) =

Barfleur may refer to:

- Barfleur, commune in Manche, Normandy
- Barfleur-class ship of the line, Royal Navy ship class
- Battles of Barfleur and La Hougue
  - Action at Barfleur, part of the above battles
- HMS Barfleur, name of five ships of the Royal Navy
- MS Barfleur (1992), French ferry
