= LMS Jubilee Class 5593 Kolhapur =

Kolhapur
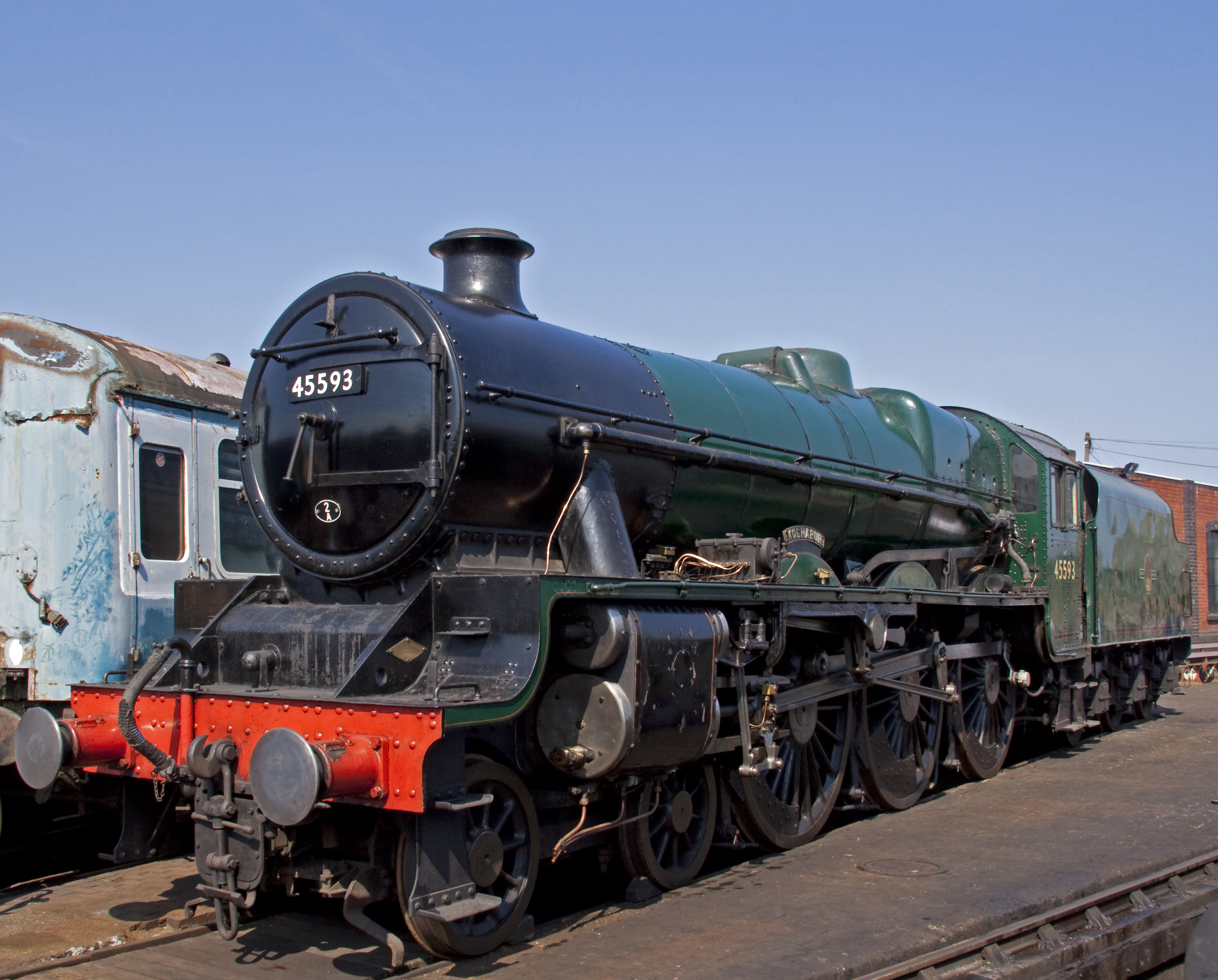
- 45593 Kolhapur at Tyseley in 2010.
Type and origin
- Power type: Steam
- Designer: William Stanier
- Builder: North British Locomotive Company
- Order number: LMS Lot 118
- Serial number: 24151
- Build date: 1934
Specifications
- Configuration
  - Whyte: 4-6-0
  - UIC: 2′C h3
- Gauge: 4 ft 8 1/2 in (1,435 mm) standard gauge
- Leading dia.: 3 ft 3 1/2 in (1.003 m)
- Driver dia.: 6 ft 9 in (2.057 m)
- Length: 64 ft 8 3/4 in (19.73 m)
- Loco weight: 79.55 long tons (80.83 t; 89.10 short tons)
- Tender weight: 54.65 long tons (55.53 t; 61.21 short tons)
- Fuel type: Coal
- Fuel capacity: 9.0 long tons (9.1 t; 10.1 short tons)
- Water cap.: 4,000 imp gal (18,000 L; 4,800 US gal)
- Boiler: LMS type 3A
- Boiler pressure: 225 lbf/in^{2} (1.55 MPa) superheated
- Cylinders: Three
- Cylinder size: 17 in × 26 in (432 mm × 660 mm)
- Valve gear: Walschaerts
- Valve type: Piston valves
Performance figures
- Tractive effort: 26,610 lbf (118.4 kN)
Career
- Operators: London, Midland and Scottish Railway; British Railways
- Power class: 5XP (LMS); 6P (BR)
- Numbers: 5593 (LMS); 45593 (BR)
- Axle load class: Route Availability 8
- Current owner: West Coast Railways

London, Midland and Scottish Railway Jubilee Class 5593 (BR number 45593) named Kolhapur is a preserved British steam locomotive.

== Revenue service ==
5593 was built in 1934 by the North British Locomotive Company of Glasgow, Works number 24151, and part of Lot 118, to a design by William Stanier. In May 1936 it was named Kolhapur after Kolhapur, a princely state in western India.

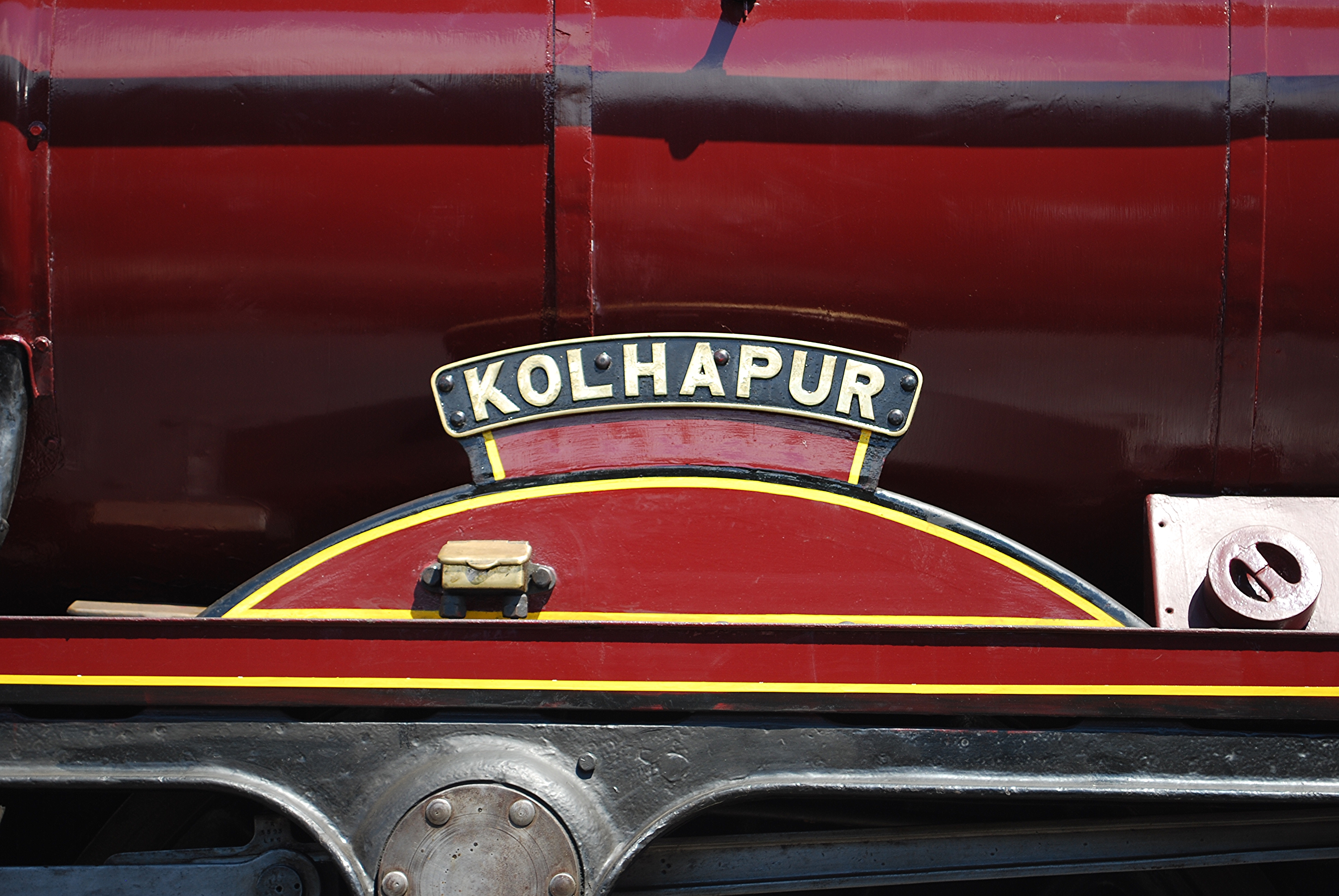
Kolhapur's right hand side nameplate, as preserved.

Initially built with a low degree superheat domeless boiler, 5593 received a domed boiler in April 1937.

5593 hauled the train carrying Winston Churchill from Liverpool on his return from talks with President Roosevelt in 1942.

After nationalisation in 1948, it was renumbered 45593 by British Railways in December of that year. It was allocated to various sheds during the 1950s and 1960s, including Longsight, Carlisle Upperby, Willesden, Aston, Burton, Patricroft and Newton Heath.

On 23 March 1965, 5593 was transferred to Leeds Holbeck and was kept there in good condition to work railtours over the Settle-Carlisle line. The locomotive was also given a yellow cabside warning stripe to indicate that it was barred from the electrified West Coast Main Line south of Crewe where it was out-of-gauge. Kolhapur was withdrawn in October 1967.

== Preservation ==
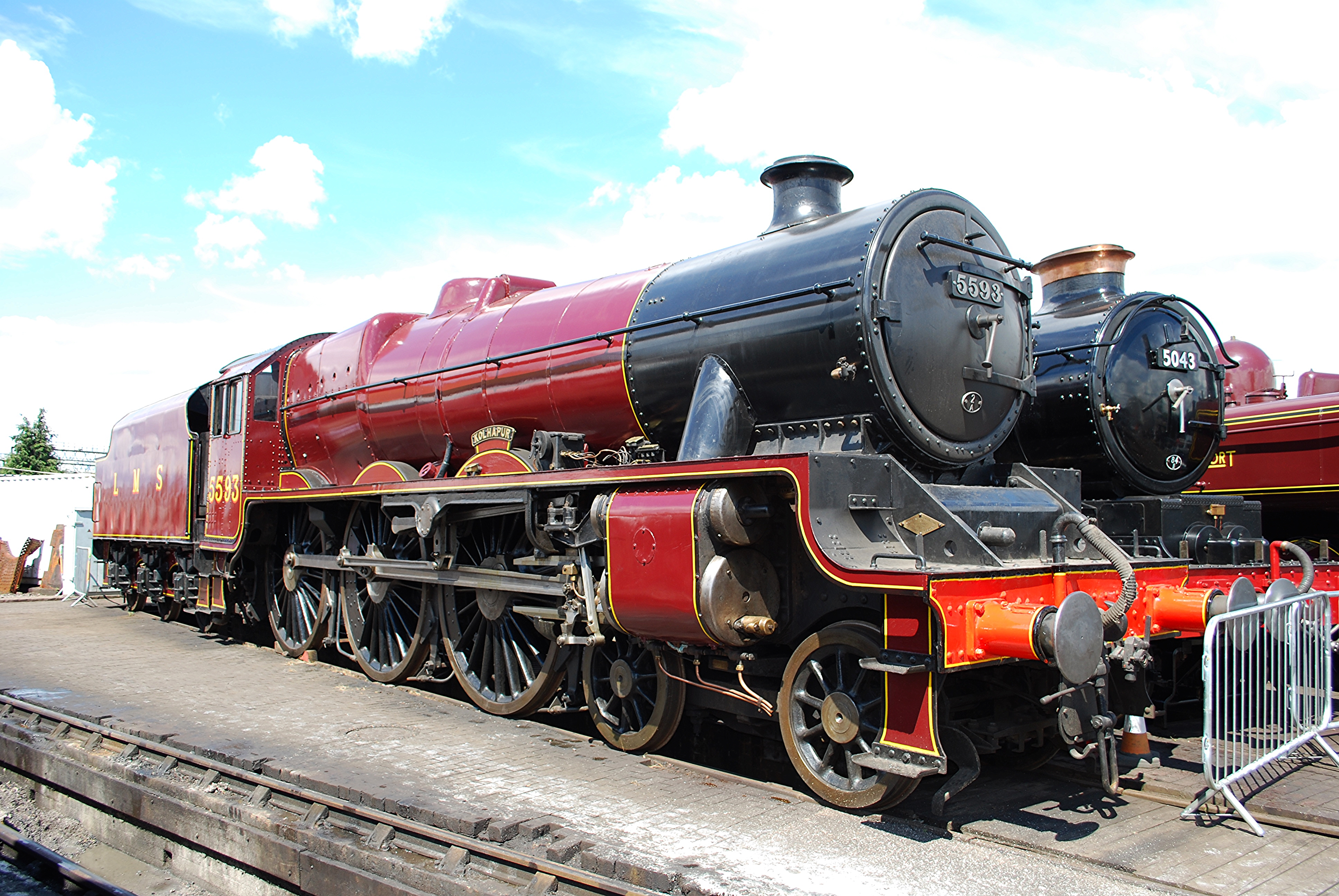
5593 Kolhapur in LMS red at Tyseley in July 2014.

45593 was bought in good condition January 1968 by the then Standard Gauge Steam Trust. It was restored during the 1980s to LMS crimson lake livery becoming a regular performer hauling railtours around the UK. In 1994, it temporarily assumed the identity and special livery of scrapped sister and class pioneer 5552 Silver Jubilee for the silver jubilee of the Great Central Railway, 45593 was repainted into BR green in 1995. 45593 was withdrawn from service in 1997 following the expiry of its boiler certificate.

In 2008, Kolhapur appeared at the York Railfest along with Castle 7029 Clun Castle. It returned to Tyseley for the Tyseley 100 celebrations. For this, it was going to be repainted into LMS crimson lake livery but this was never applied.

By January 2024, 45593 was stored out of service at Tyseley Locomotive Works, awaiting an overhaul which was expected to cost around £750,000. In the same month it was announced that with the engine not expected to be sent into the works for an overhaul, discussions were underway for Kolhapur to be sold onwards to a new owner as part of Tyseley's growth plans. In May 2024 David Smith of West Coast Railways confirmed that he had purchased 45593 and that the locomotive would move to Carnforth for a future overhaul.
