= LMS Jubilee Class 5552 Silver Jubilee =

5552 Silver Jubilee
Type and origin
- Power type: Steam
- Designer: William Stanier
- Builder: Crewe Works
- Build date: June 1934
Specifications
- Configuration
  - Whyte: 4-6-0
  - UIC: 2′C h3
- Gauge: 4 ft 8 1/2 in (1,435 mm) standard gauge
- Leading dia.: 3 ft 3 1/2 in (1.003 m)
- Driver dia.: 6 ft 9 in (2.057 m)
- Fuel type: Coal
- Cylinders: Three
- Cylinder size: 17 in × 26 in (432 mm × 660 mm)
- Valve gear: Walschaerts
- Valve type: Piston valves
Career
- Operators: London, Midland and Scottish Railway; British Railways
- Power class: 5XP (LMS); 6P (BR)
- Numbers: 5552 (LMS); 45552 (BR)
- Disposition: Scrapped

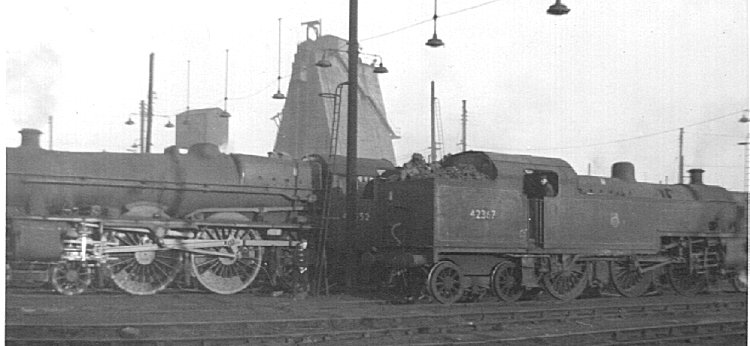
45552 Silver Jubilee (left) in the company of Fowler 2-6-4T No. 42367 at Willesden sheds in the 1960s

London Midland and Scottish Railway's number 5552 (British Railways' number 45552), named Silver Jubilee was a Jubilee Class 4-6-0 express steam locomotive. It was specially named for the Silver Jubilee of George V.

== Overview ==
The original 5552 was the first of the class that emerged in June 1934 from Crewe Works (Maker's Number: 63, Lot Number: 97). The original 5552 however swapped identities with classmate 5642 in April 1935 (built December 1934 Crewe, Maker's Number: 203, Lot Number: 112, later named Boscawen). 5552 was given a special livery of all over black (it originally had been, like the rest of the class, painted crimson lake) with silver lining and specially cast chrome numbers and named Silver Jubilee to mark the silver jubilee of George V. This scheme was retained until the 1948 nationalization by British Railways. The rest of its class were thereafter officially known as the Jubilee Class.

It originally had a low degree superheat domeless boiler, but received a high degree superheat domed boiler in 1940. The loco was allocated to several LMS depots during its service, including Longsight, Manchester, in 1947/48, from where it ran on express trains to London Euston and other destinations. It was renumbered 45552 in 1951, receiving new cast numbers. It was also given a livery of Brunswick green during the 1950s. 45552 was withdrawn from service in September 1964, and scrapped at Cashmore’s, Great Bridge.

== Preservation ==
Although 5552 was not preserved, it has been represented in preservation. In 1994, classmate 5593 Kolhapur was disguised as 5552 in original livery to mark the silver jubilee of the preserved Great Central Railway. In 2003, another preserved Jubilee, 5690 Leander was temporarily renamed Golden Jubilee for the Golden Jubilee of George V's granddaughter HM Queen Elizabeth II, though retaining the crimson lake livery.

== See also ==
- Silver Jubilee (train)
