= HMS Implacable =

Three ships of the Royal Navy have been named HMS Implacable:

- The first HMS Implacable (1805), launched in 1795 as the French ship Duguay-Trouin, was a 74-gun third-rate ship of the line. Captured by the British on 3 November 1805, she was renamed Implacable. She was scuttled in 1949, by then the second oldest ship of the Navy (after HMS Victory).
- The second HMS Implacable (1899), launched in 1899, was a Formidable-class battleship. She served in World War I and fought at the Dardanelles. She was sold for scrapping in 1921.
- The third HMS Implacable (R86), launched in 1942, was the lead ship of her class of aircraft carriers. She served in World War II and was broken up in 1954.

== Battle honours ==
- Sevolod, 1808
- Syria, 1840
- Dardanelles, 1915
- Norway, 1944
- Japan, 1945
