= HMS Express =

Eight vessels of the Royal Navy have been named HMS Express, or Express:

- Express (1695 ship) was a 6-gun advice boat of 77 tons (bm) launched at Portsmouth Dockyard in 1695, and sold in 1712.
- HMS Express (1800) was a small, 6-gun schooner-rigged advice boat launched in 1800 and sold in 1813.
- HMS Express (1815) was a schooner of 4 guns that served in the Mediterranean as a ship's tender from 1815 until she was sold at Malta in 1827. She had been Achilles, launched in 1809, and renamed Anna Maria in 1813. In 1814 she served the Royal Navy as an advice boat under the name Anna Maria.
- HMS Express (1835) was a packet brig of six guns and 362 tons (bm) launched at Deptford in 1835 and sold at Plymouth at 1862.
- HMS Express (1874) was a composite screw gunboat of four guns and 455 tons launched at Doxford in 1874, and sold in 1889.
- HMS Express (1896), a B-class torpedo boat destroyer launched in 1896.
- HMS Express (H61), an E-class destroyer launched in 1934.
- HMS Express (P163), a P2000 Archer-class patrol vessel, commissioned in the 1980s, with the pennant number P163 (renamed and redesignated from XSV Express (A163) after transfer from the disbanded Royal Naval Auxiliary Service)
