= HMS Jutland =

Two ships of the Royal Navy have been named HMS Jutland, after the Battle of Jutland:

- HMS Jutland was a to have been a Battle-class destroyer. She was launched on 2 November 1945 at Hawthorn Leslie, but was never completed. The hull was used for trials in 1947 and arrived at Rosyth for breaking up in 1957.
- HMS Jutland (D62) was another Battle-class destroyer. She was originally named HMS Malplaquet, but was renamed in 1945 before being launched in 1946. She was broken up in 1965
