= HMS Barfleur =

List of ships with the same or similar names

Five ships of the Royal Navy have been named HMS Barfleur after the Battle of Barfleur:

- HMS Barfleur (1697) was a 90-gun second-rate ship of the line launched in 1697, rebuilt in 1716 with 80 guns, and hulked in 1764. She was broken up in 1783.
- HMS Barfleur (1768) was a 90-gun second-rate ship of the line launched in 1768, and later increased to 98 guns. She was broken up in 1819.
- HMS Barfleur was a 100-gun first-rate ship of the line launched in 1762 as HMS Britannia (1762). She was renamed HMS Barfleur in 1819 and was broken up in 1825.
- HMS Barfleur (1892) was a Centurion-class battleship launched in 1892 and broken up in 1910.
- HMS Barfleur (D80) was a Battle-class destroyer launched in 1943 and broken up in 1966.

== Battle honours ==
Ships named Barfleur have earned the following battle honours:

- Vigo, 1702
- Velez Malaga, 1704
- Passero, 1718
- St Kitts, 1782
- The Saints, 1782
- First of June, 1794
- Groix Island, 1795
- St Vincent, 1797
- China, 1900

== See also ==
- Barfleur (disambiguation)
