= HMS Galatea =

HMS Galatea, after the Galatea of mythology, has been the name of eight ships in the British Royal Navy.

- HMS Galatea (1776) was a 20-gun sixth-rate post-ship launched in 1776 and broken up in 1783.
- HMS Galatea (1794) was a 32-gun fifth rate launched in 1794 and broken up 1809.
- HMS Galatea (1810) was a 36-gun fifth rate launched in 1810, a coal hulk after 1836, and broken up 1849.
- HMS Galatea (1859) was a wooden screw frigate launched in 1859 and broken up 1883. In 1866 she went on a world cruise, under the command of the Prince Alfred, Duke of Edinburgh.
- HMS Galatea (1887) was an Orlando-class first-class cruiser built in Glasgow, and launched on 10 March 1887 and sold for scrapping on 5 April 1905.
- HMS Galatea (1914) was an Arethusa-class light cruiser launched on 14 May 1914 at William Beardmore and Company shipyard and sold 1921.
- HMS Galatea (71) was a light cruiser of (another) Arethusa class, launched on 9 August 1934 at Scotts shipyard in Greenock, Scotland, torpedoed and sunk in the Mediterranean on 14 December 1941 with the loss of most of her crew.
- HMS Galatea (1946) was a RNVR stone frigate in Kingston upon Hull decommissioned in 1958.
- HMS Galatea (F18) was a Leander-class frigate built in 1963 and expended as a target in 1988.
