= Silver Jubilee of George V =

25th anniversary of the monarch's accession

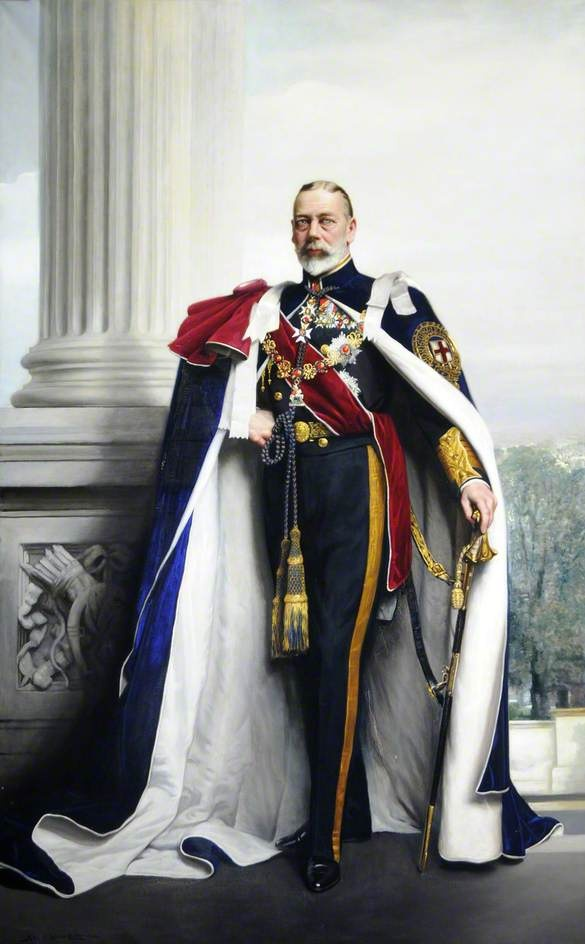
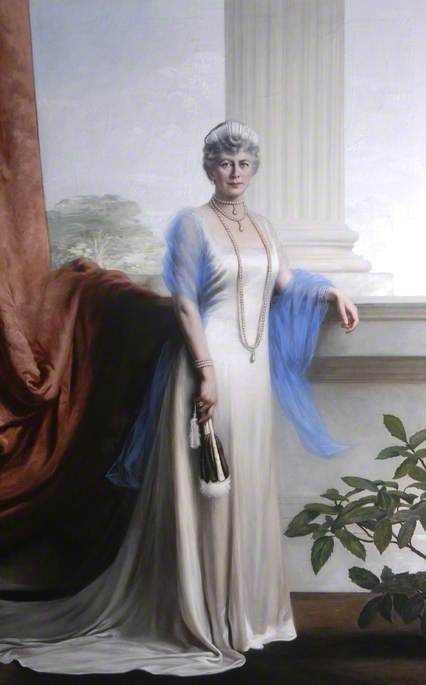
- From left to right: King George V, wearing Garter robes, poses for his Silver Jubilee portrait by John St Helier Lander; Queen Mary poses for a portrait by Lander
- Genre: Jubilee of the monarch of the United Kingdom and the British Dominions
- Date: 6 May 1935; 91 years ago
- Country: United Kingdom; British Dominions; British India; British Empire
- Previous event: Diamond Jubilee of Queen Victoria
- Next event: Silver Jubilee of Elizabeth II

The Silver Jubilee of George V on 6 May 1935 marked 25 years of George V as the King of the United Kingdom and the British Dominions, and Emperor of India. The Jubilee was marked with large-scale and popular events throughout London and the rest of the United Kingdom in May 1935. It was the first ever Silver Jubilee celebration of a British monarch in history. The King died only eight months later at Sandringham House.

== Celebrations ==
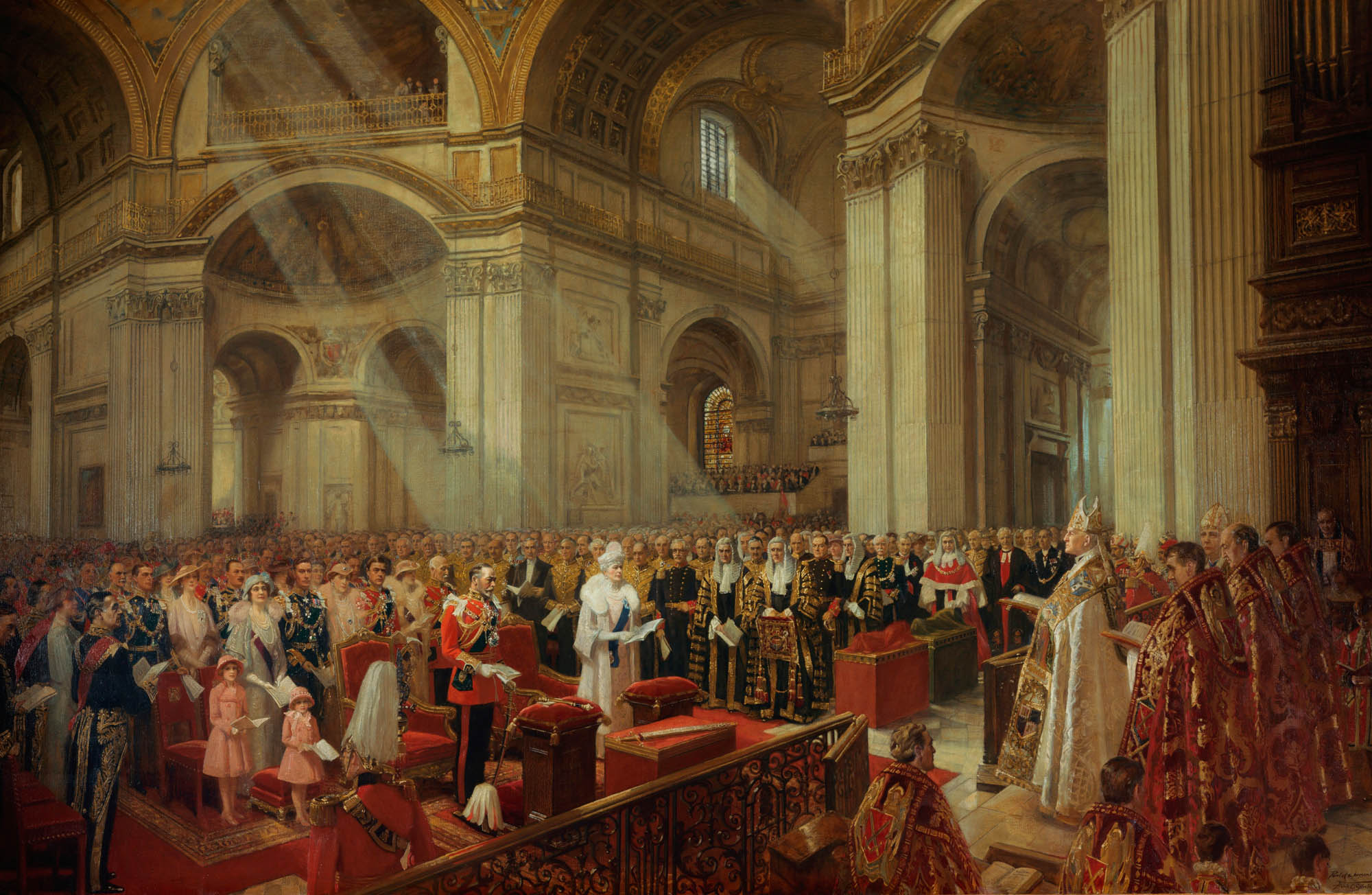
The Heart of The Empire, a painting by Frank O. Salisbury, which depicts the Silver Jubilee Thanksgiving Service inside St Paul's Cathedral on 6 May 1935

The Silver Jubilee Celebrations in London began with a carriage procession through the City to St Paul's Cathedral for a national service of thanksgiving on 6 May 1935. It was followed by another procession back to Buckingham Palace, where the royal family appeared on the balcony. The King and Queen were joined by members of the Royal Family, including Queen Maud of Norway, the Prince of Wales, the Duke and Duchess of York, the Princess Royal and the Earl of Harewood, the Duke of Gloucester, and the Duke and Duchess of Kent. Due to popular demand, the King waved from the same balcony for a few consecutive days later in the same week.

The Jubilee day was declared a bank holiday and celebrations were held across the United Kingdom with garden parties, pageants and sports events. At 8 pm, the King's Jubilee speech was broadcast. He gave thanks "from the depths of his heart to his dear people" on behalf of himself and Queen Mary, for the Jubilee commemorations.

Throughout the month of May, the King continued taking carriage rides through London. He also took one through north London for the Queen's birthday on 26 May, during which they were accompanied by their two granddaughters: Princesses Elizabeth and Margaret of York.

The Jubilee was also marked with a ball for two thousand guests at Buckingham Palace on 14 May, an Empire Exhibition and the State Opening of Parliament. A reception was hosted by the Lord Mayor of London in honour of the King and Queen, which was also attended by the Prince of Wales and the Duke and Duchess of York.

During the Jubilee celebrations, the King received a large number of telegrams from across the empire and around the world, with warm wishes, both from world leaders and his subjects. The public's reaction to George V's appearances over the jubilant celebrations only confirmed the popularity of a Jubilee celebration as well as the esteem in which the King was held.

== Other commemorations ==
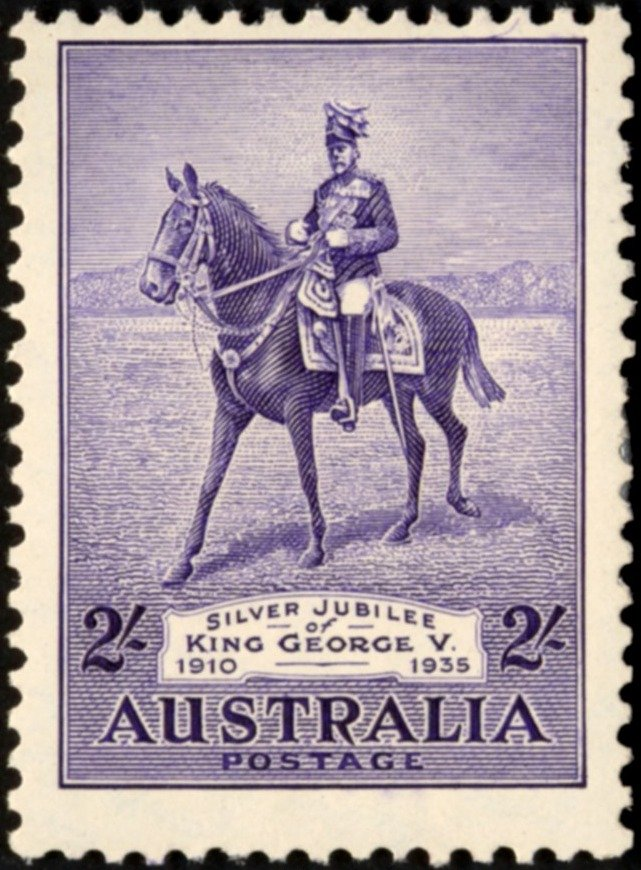
An Australian stamp marking the Silver Jubilee of King George V

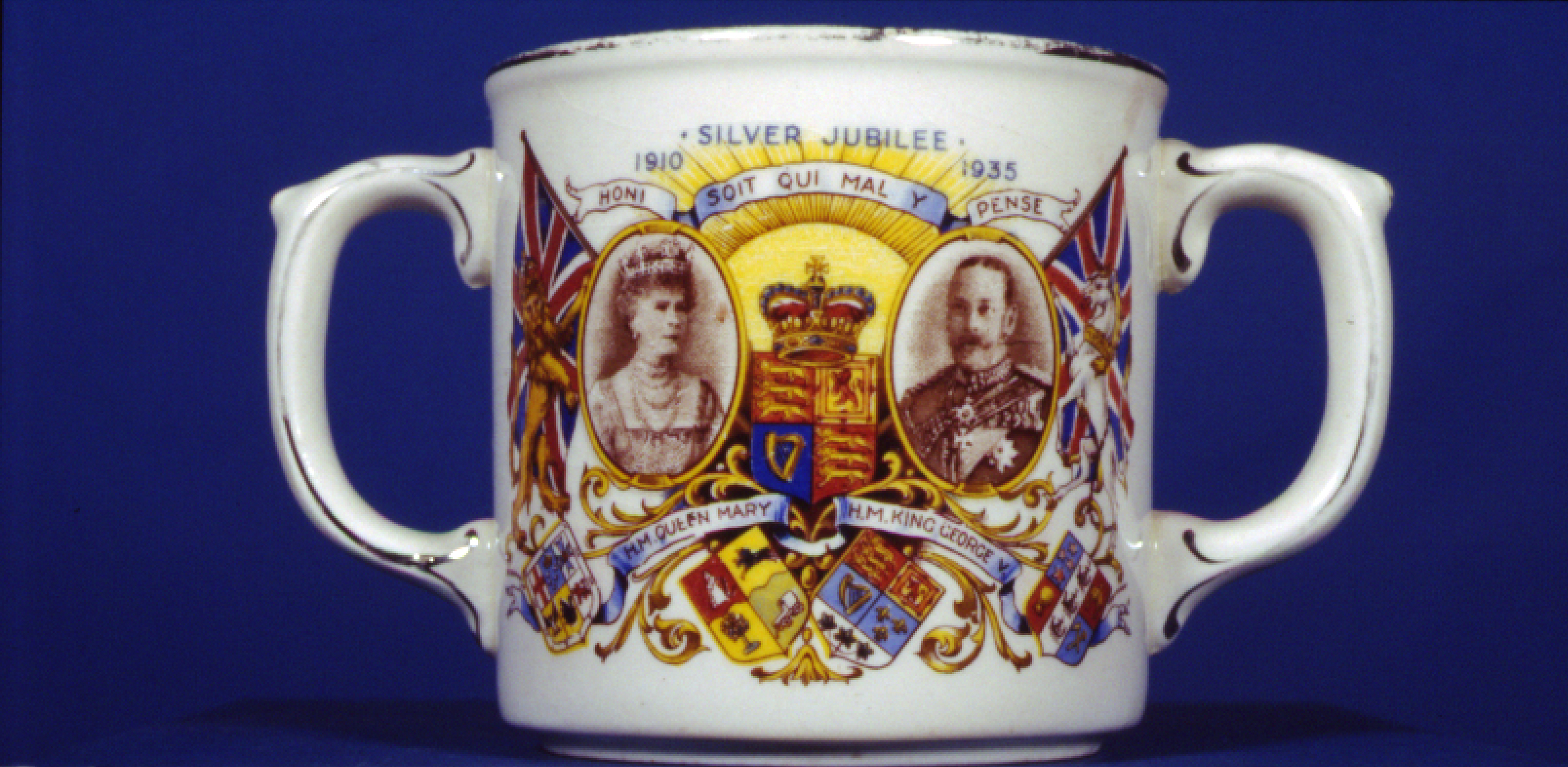
A mug with two handles, displaying portraits of King George V and Queen Mary surrounded by flags and regalia, commemorating the King's Silver Jubilee

A Silver Jubilee Medal was created to a commemorate the Jubilee. It was awarded to the members of the royal family and selected officers of state, officials and servants of the Royal Household, ministers, government officials, mayors, public servants, local government officials, members of the navy, army, air force and police in Britain, her colonies and dominions.

The Jubilee was marked by loads of different Jubilee souvenirs. Every child born on the Jubilee Day (6 May 1935) was given a special silver commemorative cup. A Silver crown coin was also released by the Royal Mint to mark the Jubilee. Specific sets of stamps were issued for the Jubilee in the United Kingdom and the dominions, including issues in Australia, Canada, India, New Zealand and South Africa.

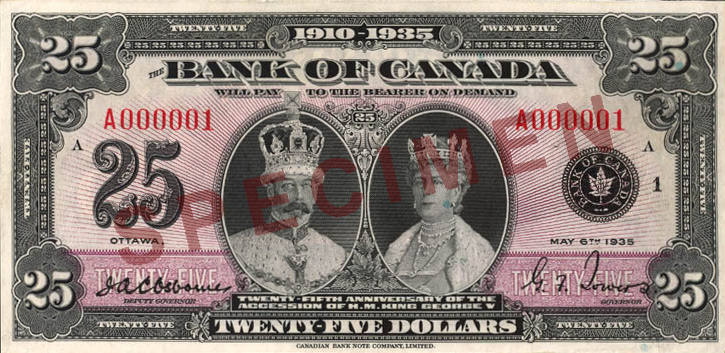
The obverse of the English-language version of the $25 banknote. The portraits are of King George V on the left and Queen Mary on the right.

The Bank of Canada issued its first commemorative banknote to commemorate the King's Silver Jubilee. It was a $25 banknote in the 1935 Series. The royal purple banknote was issued on 6 May 1935, and is the only $25 banknote ever issued by the Bank of Canada.

A mountain in Strathcona Provincial Park on Vancouver Island in British Columbia, Canada, was named Mount George V after George V, to commemorate his Silver Jubilee in 1935.

In Sungai Petani, Malaysia, a 12.1 m clock tower was built on the main street, Jalan Ibrahim, in 1936. The tower, topped by a dome-shaped structure, was a present from Lim Lean Teng to King George V and Queen Mary to commemorate the Silver Jubilee.

The Jubilee Pool, an open-air seaside lido, was opened in Penzance, Cornwall, to commemorate the Jubilee.

For the 1935 Silver Jubilee, the first version of Jubilee chicken was created, and was based on chicken dressed with mayonnaise and curry powder.

== Gallery ==
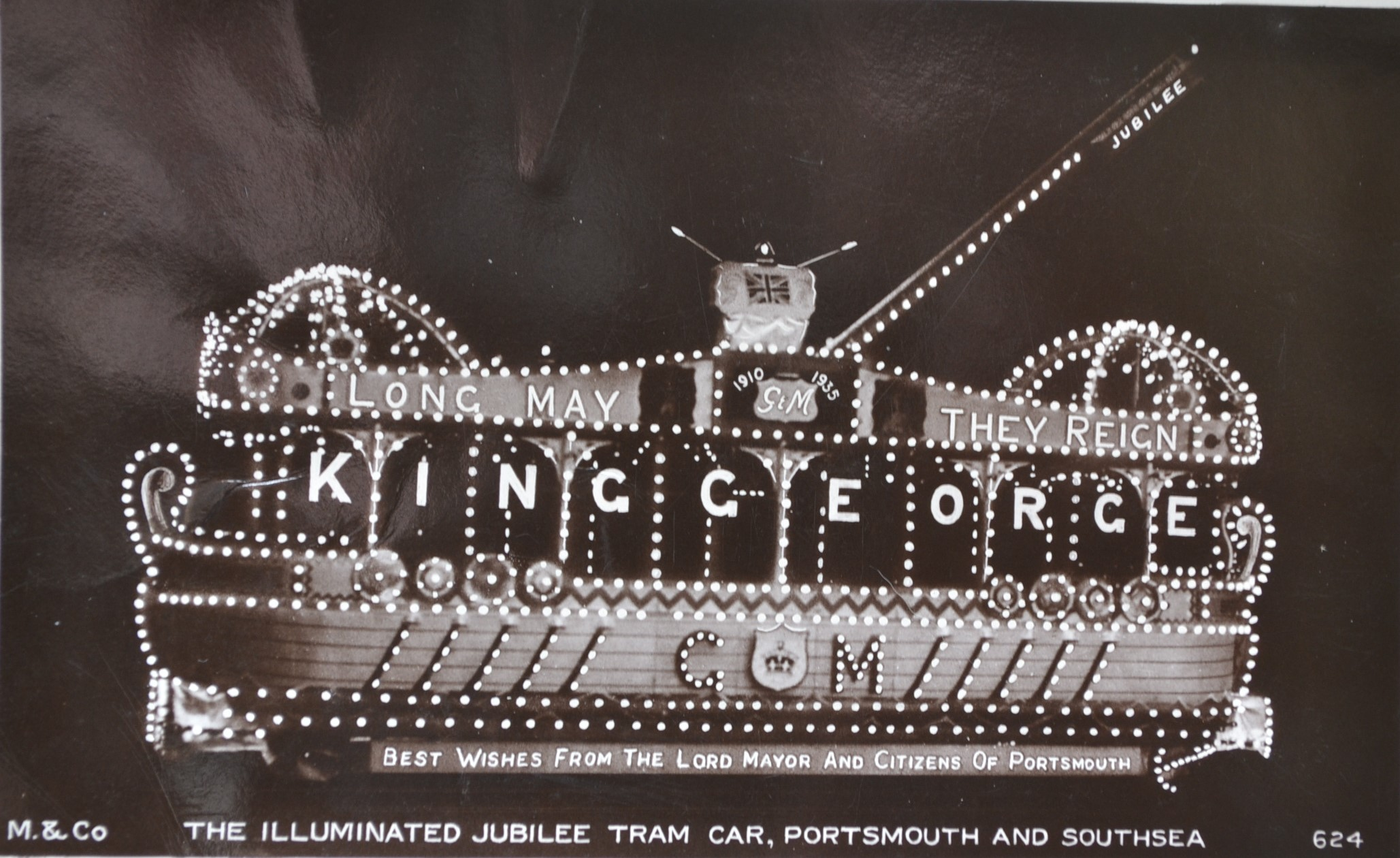
A postcard showing an illuminated tramcar of the Portsmouth Corporation Tramways celebrating the King's Silver Jubilee

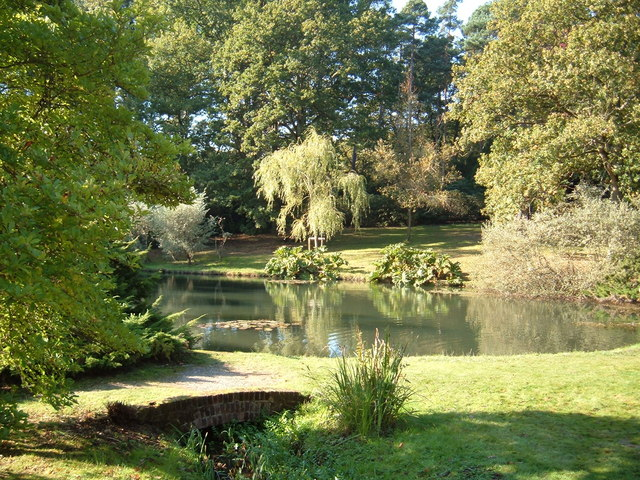
Jubilee Pond at Exbury Gardens created to commemorate the Silver Jubilee of King George V

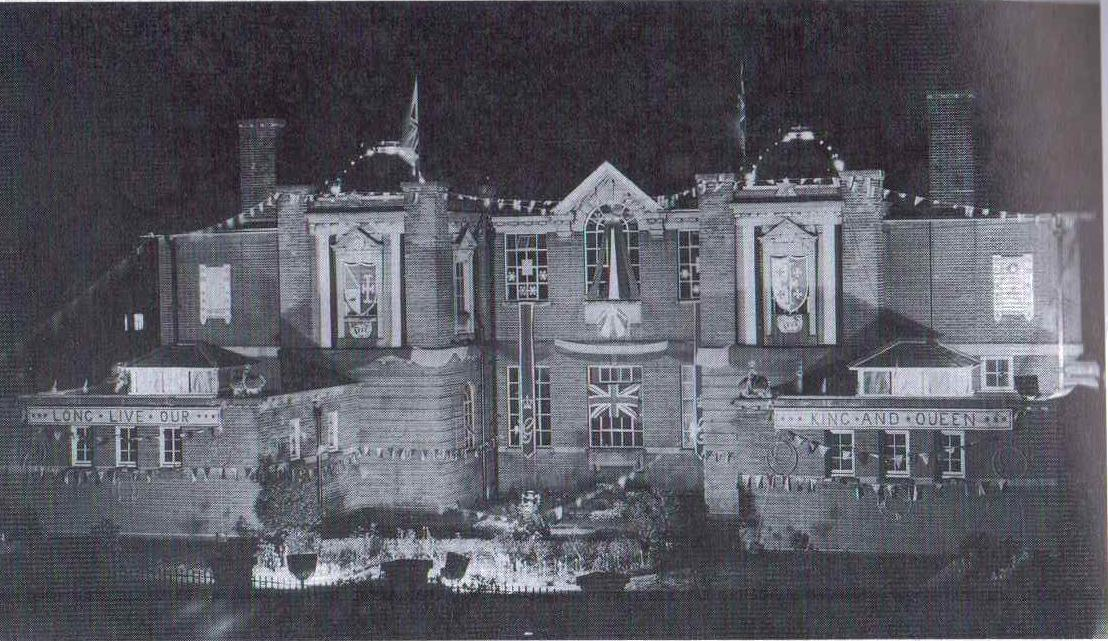
A school dressed overall and floodlit to mark the King's Silver Jubilee in 1935

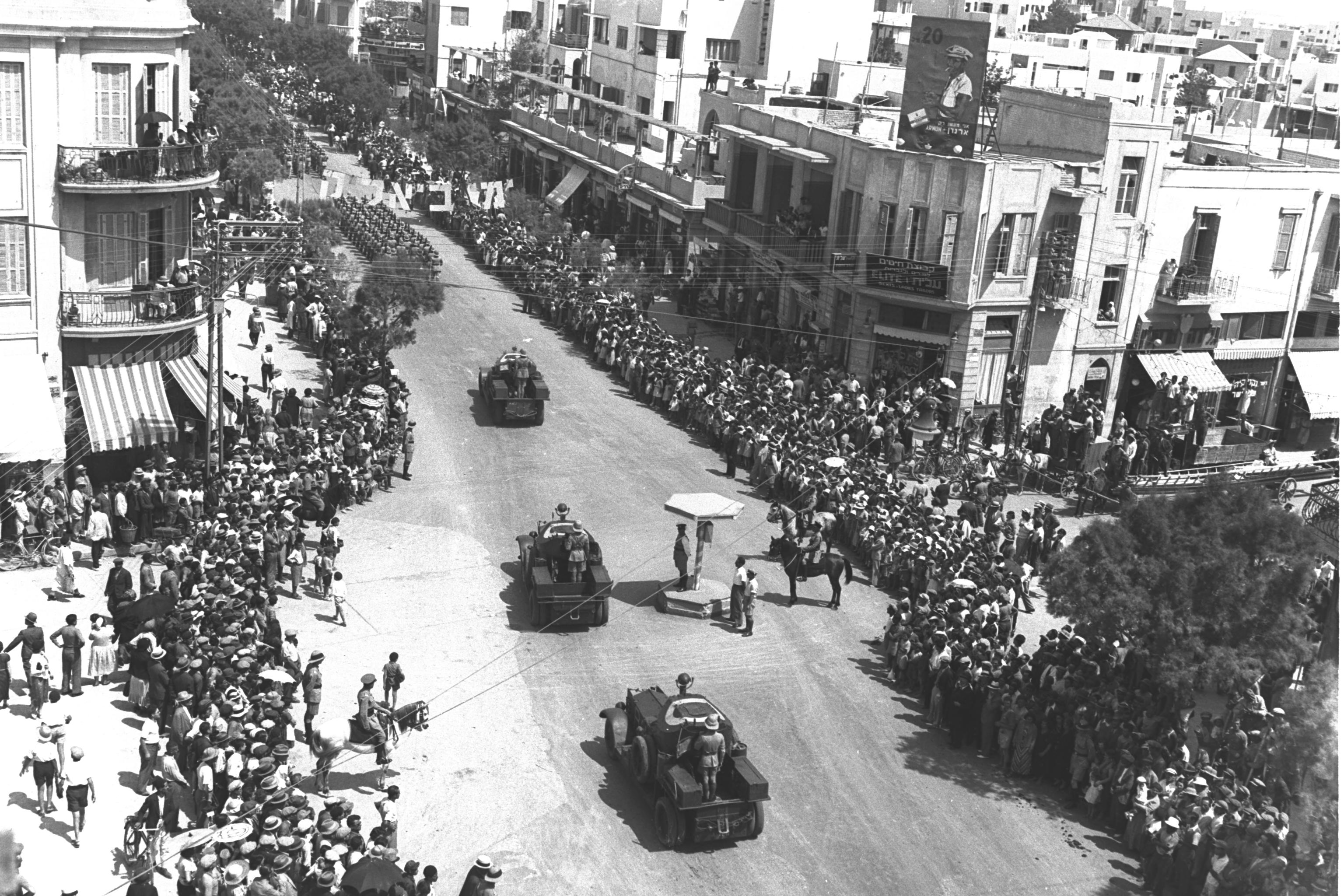
British armoured vehicles parading through Allenby Street in Tel Aviv, in honour of the Silver Jubilee of King George V

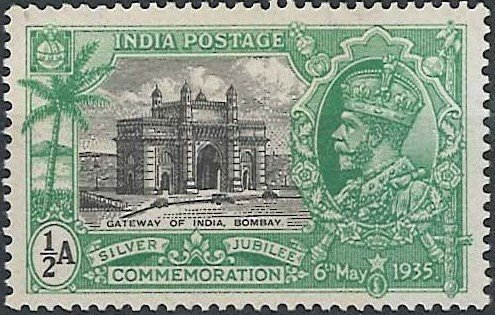
An Indian stamp commemorating the Silver Jubilee of George V, Emperor of India

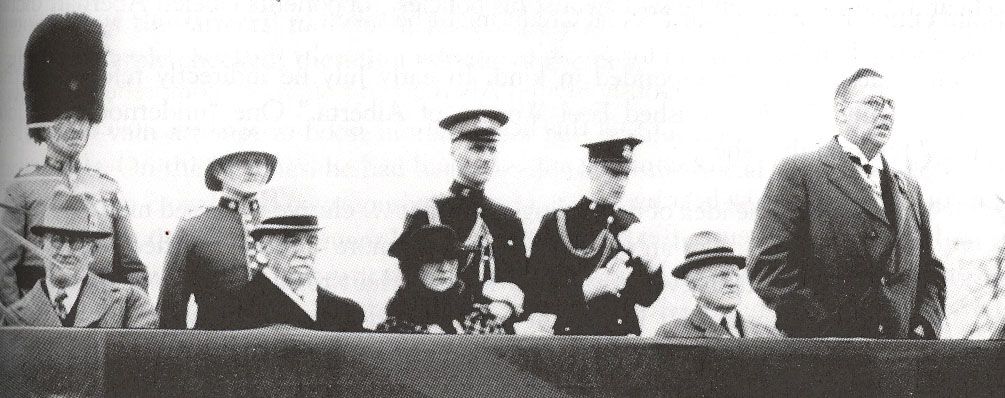
Alberta Premier Richard Gavin Reid speaking on the occasion of King George V's Silver Jubilee

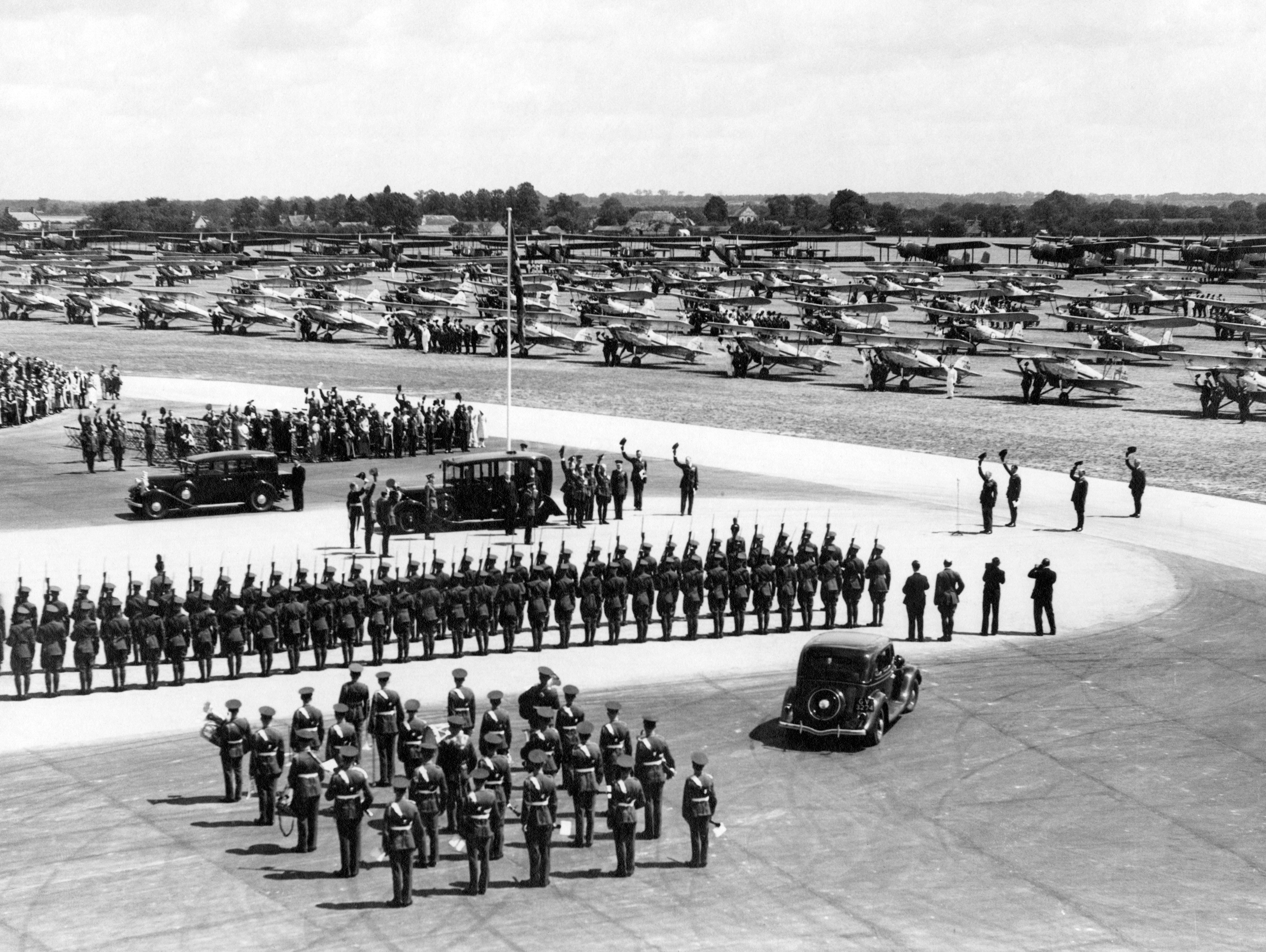
The Guard of Honour saluting King George V on his arrival at Mildenhall on 6 July 1935 for the Silver Jubilee Review of the Royal Air Force

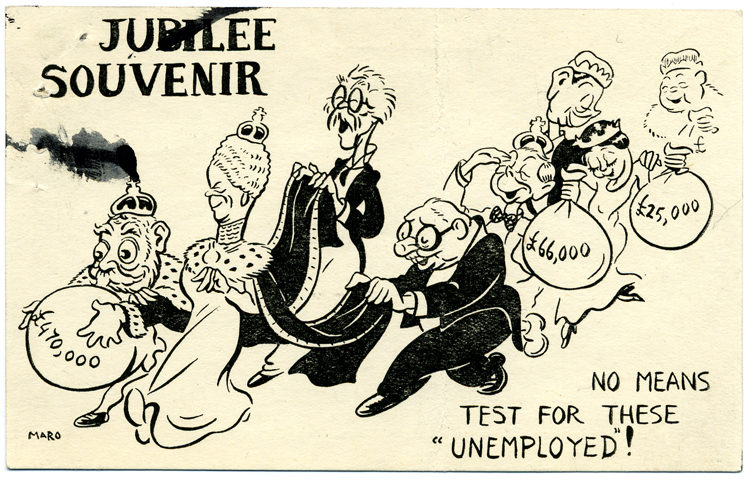
No means test for these 'unemployed'! by Maro. The public expense for the Silver Jubilee in the midst of a financial depression caused some controversy.

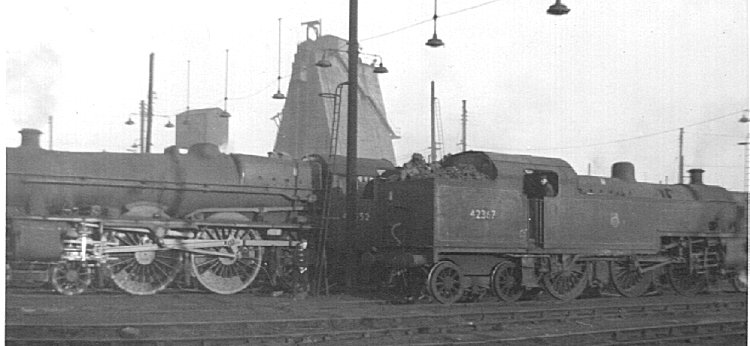
45552 Silver Jubilee (left) was specially christened in honour of the Silver Jubilee of George V.

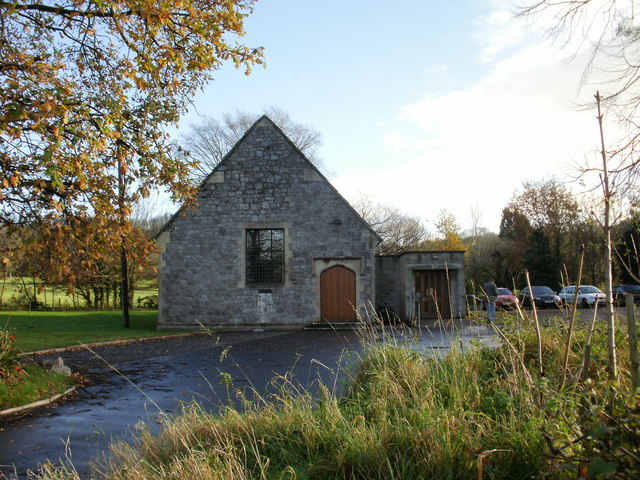
Cleeve Village Hall, erected in 1936, to commemorate the Silver Jubilee of George V

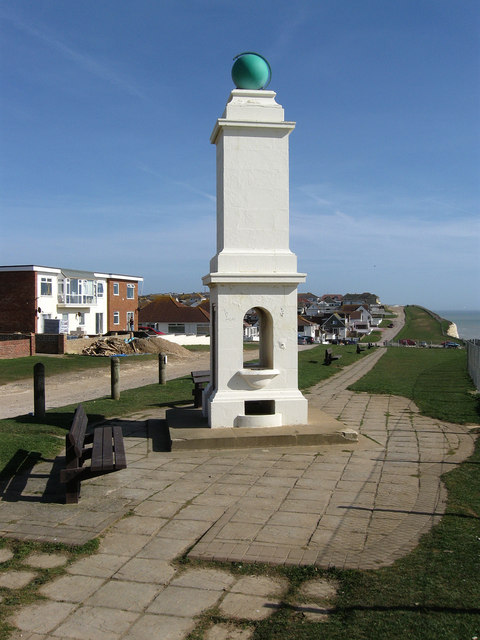
Meridian Monument in Peacehaven, England, built in 1936, to commemorate the Silver Jubilee of George V

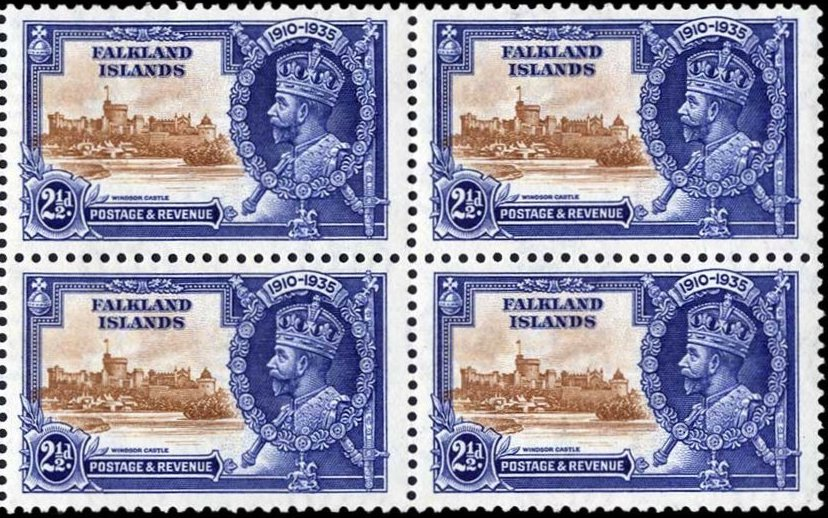
Falklands Islands stamps marking the Silver Jubilee of King George V

== See also ==
- 1935 Birthday Honours
- 1935 Birthday Honours (New Zealand)
- Special address by the British monarch
- List of monarchs in Britain by length of reign
- List of jubilees of British monarchs
