= BackTrack (magazine) =

Railway history magazine

Back Track
- Cover of Back Track Vol.38 №6, June 2024
- Editor: Michael Blakemore
- Former editors: Nigel Trevena; David Jenkinson
- Categories: Railway nostalgia
- Frequency: Monthly
- Format: A4
- Publisher: Michael Blakemore
- Founder: Nigel Trevena
- Founded: 1986
- First issue: 1986
- Company: Pendragon Publishing
- Country: United Kingdom
- Based in: Easingwold
- Language: English
- Website: www.pendragonpublishing.co.uk
- ISSN: 0955-5382
- OCLC: 813174226

BackTrack is a monthly magazine, published by Pendragon Publishing, concentrating on researched articles and photographic features about British and Irish railway history. It is available through newsagents in the UK and by subscription from the publisher, but does not rely on advertising income and therefore does not publish an ABC circulation figure.

== History ==
The magazine was founded in 1986 by Nigel Trevena, of Atlantic Transport Publishers (based in Truro, Cornwall), for the purpose of "recording Britain's railway history" (strapline until mid-1993). The editorial in the 'introductory issue' promised that each issue would contain "at least one article on each or the 'Big Four' companies ... (or their respective BR region)", would have "a branch line article in every issue" and would ignore current developments and the preservation scene. The magazine generally adheres to these principles even today, and it claims to be the leading (general purpose) railway historical magazine in Britain (current strapline).

Trevena was forced to retire from active participation in 1989 for health reasons and handed the editorship to David Jenkinson, who had then recently retired from his job at the National Railway Museum to concentrate on writing. In turn, Jenkinson's health lead him, at the end of 1994, to hand on the post of editor to Michael Blakemore, the present incumbent. David Jenkinson and Michael Blakemore's company Pendragon Publishing (office located in Easingwold, N. Yorks) bought the rights to the magazine from Atlantic in 2003.

== Content ==
Back Track presents a nostalgic history of Britain’s railways for its readership, which is largely made up of railway enthusiasts and trainspotters. The contents include picture features of two to five pages, usually in colour, and articles which may be described as amateur-scholarly, with sources footnoted, accompanied by colour or black-and-white illustrations and maps or diagrams as appropriate. A small section at the back contains "Reader's forum" (letters) and book reviews. Advertising is kept to a minimum (usually inside-front-cover and inside-back-cover only). No subjects more recent than ten years before publication are entertained, although contemporary developments affecting historic subjects are mentioned when necessary and current approaches to railway history are occasionally analyzed.

In particular, the magazine hosts a long-running series of pieces by Michael Rutherford, which started in Vol. 9, no. 1 under the title 'Provocations' and became 'Railway reflections' from vol. 11, no. 1 onwards, appearing monthly but with occasional gaps, in which he looks at "old themes from new perspectives, bring(s) apparently disparate themes together or put(s) some specialized railway subject in a more general historical context". Often he considers aspects of 'received' railway history and tries to examine new aspects of them or to dispel common myths.

== Summary information ==
=== Publishing ===
publisher	issues	frequency
Atlantic Transport Publishers, Truro, (later Penryn), Cornwall	Introductory, 1986; vol.1, 1987 – vol.17, 2003	v.1-3: 4/year; v.4-8: 6/year; v.9-17 monthly
Pendragon Publishing, Easingwold, York	vol. 18, 2004 onwards to date (as at August 2012)	monthly

=== Editors ===
editor	issues	dates
Nigel Trevena	"0", 1.1–3.1	1986–1989
David Jenkinson	3.2–8.6	1989–1994
Michael Blakemore	9.1–23.8 and continuing	1995—

== Modellers' Backtrack ==
A companion magazine from the same publisher (Atlantic), Modellers' BackTrack, ran from April/May 1991 to February/March 1995, alternating months with the, then bi-monthly, main title. Initially edited by David Jenkinson, then by him with Barry C. Lane and latterly by Lane alone, it aimed to provide prototype information relative to railway modellers, including scale drawings, and features on high-quality models and layouts. After vol.4, no.6 it was subsumed into the main title, which went monthly at that point.

== Bibliography ==
BackTrack cumulative index to volumes 1-25, compiled by Terry Penfold, 24pp., Pendragon, 2012 (online at Pendragon Publishing)

== See also ==
- List of rail transport-related periodicals
