= Bob Essery =

British railway modeller and historian (1930–2021)

- Born: Robert John Essery; 22 November 1930; Hall Green, Birmingham, England
- Died: 23 November 2021 (aged 91)
- Occupations: Railway modeller; Historian; Writer; Fireman
- Spouse: Wynne (m. 1962)
- Children: 2

Robert John "Bob" Essery (22 November 1930 – 23 November 2021) was a British railway modeller and historian with a particular interest in the London Midland and Scottish Railway (LMS) and one of its principal constituents, the Midland Railway (MR).

Essery was one of the founding members of the LMS Society in 1963, and particularly with David Jenkinson has authored many books. He worked in his early working years as a fireman on the LMS. Essery also established the historical journals Midland Record and LMS Journal. From 1999 in collaboration with the National Railway Museum, Essery with others have produced monographs on individual locomotive classes.

== Bibliography ==
- Locomotive Liveries of the LMS D Jenkinson & R J Essery 1967 B 0-711003-05-X Ian Allan
- The LMS Coach D Jenkinson & R J Essery 1969 B 0-7110-0074-3 Ian Allan
- British Goods Wagons R J Essery, D Rowland & W O Steel 1970 B 0-7153-4739-X David & Charles
- Portrait of the LMS V R Anderson, R J Essery & D Jenkinson 1971 B 0-900586-32-X Peco
- LMS Coaches 1923 - 57 D Jenkinson & R J Essery 1977 B 0-902888-83-8 Oxford Publishing Company
- An Illustrated History of Midland Wagons Vol 1 R J Essery 1980 B 0-86093-040-8 Oxford Publishing Company
- An Illustrated History of Midland Wagons Vol 2 R J Essery 1980 B 0-86093-041-6 Oxford Publishing Company
- An Illustrated History of LMS Wagons Vol 1 R J Essery 1981 B 0-86093-127-7 Oxford Publishing Company
- LMS Locomotives Vol 1 General Review D Jenkinson & R J Essery 1981 B 0-86093-087-4 Oxford Publishing Company
- Midland Carriages (1877 0nwards) D Jenkinson & R J Essery 1984 B 0-86093-291-5 Oxford Publishing Company
- Midland Locomotives from 1883 Vol 1 General Survey' D Jenkinson & R J Essery 1984 B 0-906867-27-4 Wild Swan Publications
- LMS Locomotives Vol 2 Pre group Western & Central Div D Jenkinson & R J Essery 1985 B 0-86093-264-8 Oxford Publishing Company
- LMS Locomotives Vol 4 Pre group Midland D Jenkinson & R J Essery 1987 B 0-947971-16-5 Silver Link
- Midland Locomotives from 1883 Vol 2 Passenger Tender D Jenkinson & R J Essery 1988 B 0-906867-59-2 Wild Swan Publications
- Midland Locomotives from 1883 Vol 3 Tank Engines D Jenkinson & R J Essery 1988 B 0-906867-66-5 Wild Swan Publications
- LMS Locomotives Vol 5 Post group standards D Jenkinson & R J Essery 1989 B 0-947971-39-4 Silver Link
- Midland Locomotives from 1883 Vol 4 Goods Tender D Jenkinson & R J Essery 1989 B 0-906867-74-6 Wild Swan Publications
- LMS Standard Coaching Stock Vol 1 General Intro & NPCS D Jenkinson & R J Essery 1991 B 0-869034-50-0 Oxford Publishing Company
- LMS Jubilees R J Essery & G Toms 1994 B 1-874103-17-8 Wild Swan Publications
- LMS Locomotives Vol 3 Pre group Northern Div D Jenkinson & R J Essery 1994 B 1-857940-24-5 Silver Link
- LMS Standard Coaching Stock Vol 2 Gen Service Gangwayed vehicles D Jenkinson & R J Essery 1994 B 0-869034-51-9 Oxford Publishing Company
- LMS Reflections R J Essery & N Harris 1995 B 0-947971-09-2 Silver Link
- Official Drawings of LMS Wagons Vol 1 R J Essery 1997 B 1-874103-30-5 Wild Swan Publications
- Official Drawings of LMS Wagons Vol 2 R J Essery 1998 B 1-874103-33-X Wild Swan Publications
- LMS & LNER Garratts R J Essery & G Toms 1998 B 0-906867-93-2 Wild Swan Publications
- LMS Locomotive Profiles: No. 1 The Rebuilt Royal Scots F James, B D Hunt & R J Essery 1999 B 1-874103-49-6 Wild Swan Publications
- Midland Engines: No. 1 The '1883' & '2228' Class Bogie Passenger Tanks F James, B D Hunt & R J Essery 1999 B 1-874103-50-X Wild Swan Publications
- British Railway Modelling - A Century of Progress R J Essery 1 2000 B B.R.Modelling
- Midland Engines: No. 3 The Class 2 Superheated 4-4-0's (483 Class Rebuilds) B D Hunt, R J Essery & F James 2000 B 1-874103-60-7 Wild Swan Publications
- LMS Locomotive Profiles: No. 2 The Horwich Moguls F James, B D Hunt & R J Essery 2000 B 1-874103-56-9 Wild Swan Publications
- Midland Engines: No. 2 The Class 3 Belpaire Goods Engines F James, B D Hunt & R J Essery 2000 B 1-874103-55-X Wild Swan Publications
- LMS Standard Coaching Stock Vol 3 Non Corridor & Special purpose D Jenkinson & R J Essery 2000 B 0-869034-52-7 Oxford Publishing Company
- Midland Engines: No. 4 The '700 Class' Double-framed Goods Engines F James, B D Hunt & R J Essery 2002 B 1-874103-73-9 Wild Swan Publications
- London Tilbury & Southend Railway & its Locomotives R J Essery 1 2001 B 0-86093-561-2 Oxford Publishing Company
- Raymond Williams 'LMS Steam in the Thirties' P Boswell & R J Essery 2002 B 1-874103-64-X Wild Swan Publications
- LMS Locomotive Profiles: No. 3 The Parallel Boiler 2-6-4 Tank engines B D Hunt, R J Essery & F James 2002 B 1-874103-72-0 Wild Swan Publications
- Ashchurch to Barnt Green R J Essery 2002 B 0-86093-562-0 Oxford Publishing Company
- LMS Locomotive Profile No. 4 - Princess Royal Pacifics B D Hunt, R J Essery & F James 2003 B 1-874103-86-0 Wild Swan Publications
- LMS Locomotive Profile No. 5 - The Mixed Traffic Class 5s Nos. 5000 - 5224 B D Hunt, F James & R J Essery with J Jennison & D Clarke 2003 B 1-874103-87-9 Wild Swan Publications
  - Pictorial Supplement to LMS Locomotive Profile No. 5 J Jennison & D Clarke with B D Hunt, F James & R J Essery 2003 B 1-874103-83-6 Wild Swan Publications
- The LMS Wagon K Morgan & R J Essery B 0-7153-7357-9 David & Charles
