= Van Riemsdijk =

van Riemsdijk (also spelled van Riemsdyk) is a surname, literally "of belt dike". Notable people with the surname include:

== van Riemsdijk ==
- Herman Claudius van Riemsdijk (born 1948), Brazilian chess player
- Jeremias van Riemsdijk (1712–1777), Dutch noble and Governor-General of the Dutch East Indies
- John Van Riemsdijk (1924–2008), an Anglo-Dutch curator of the Science Museum, London and model engineer.
- Henk van Riemsdijk (1911–2005), Dutch CEO of Philips.

== van Riemsdyk ==
- James van Riemsdyk (born 1989), American professional ice hockey forward for the Columbus Blue Jackets.
- Trevor van Riemsdyk (born 1991), American professional ice hockey defenseman for the Washington Capitals.
