= John Coiley =

English museum curator

John Arthur Coiley (1932–1998) was an English museum curator, principally associated with the National Railway Museum in York from its formation in the 1973-5 period, through to his retirement as keeper of the museum in 1992.

== Biography ==
Coiley was born in West Norwood, London, and educated at Beckenham and Penge County Grammar School and later at Selwyn College, Cambridge, graduating in 1954. He was awarded a PhD in 1959 in the field of electron microscopy.

He married Patricia Anne Dixon in 1956, and the couple had a daughter and two sons.

Coiley's early career was outside the museum sector, working first for the UK Atomic Energy Authority, and later for two private research institutions. He joined the Science Museum in 1973 and – probably in part as a result of a lifelong interest in railway history, which included photographic contributions to Images of Steam, a 1968 publication – was appointed the first keeper of the National Railway Museum in 1974. The establishment of the museum outside London was controversial, but under Coiley's leadership proved immediately successful. Over the period of his leadership, the museum "achieved a stature and authority without precedent in the fields of railway history and preservation". Perhaps appropriately, the year before his retirement the NRM received the Museum of the Year Award.

Coiley was also responsible for the return to steam of Great Western Railway 3440 City of Truro in 1984 for the Great Western 150 celebrations in 1985. The locomotive was restored at the Severn Valley Railway; during its time there, Steam Railway magazine secretly had the driver's side of the locomotive painted in BR lined black as BR 3717. When Coiley visited in 1984, workshops manager Alun Rees had the locomotive parked with the driver's side against the workshop wall, so Coiley could not see that the locomotive had been repainted into BR black. It was said that Coiley would not have understood, but was kept unaware until 1985 when the magazine released the images.

He was president of the International Association of Transport Museums from 1983 to 1986. The Heritage Railway Association awards a John Coiley Award, for locomotive preservation.

Coiley died at Chur railway station, Switzerland on 22 May 1998 whilst leading a tour of rail enthusiasts.

== Publications ==
- Train, Dorling Kindersley Publishers Ltd, 1998
- Rocket to Eurostar: National Railway Museum in Camera - Atlantic Transport Publishers, 1996
- Images of Steam, 1968 - ISBN 0-7110-0056-5 - contributed photographs
