= LMS Princess Coronation Class 6229 Duchess of Hamilton =

Preserved British steam locomotive

Duchess of Hamilton
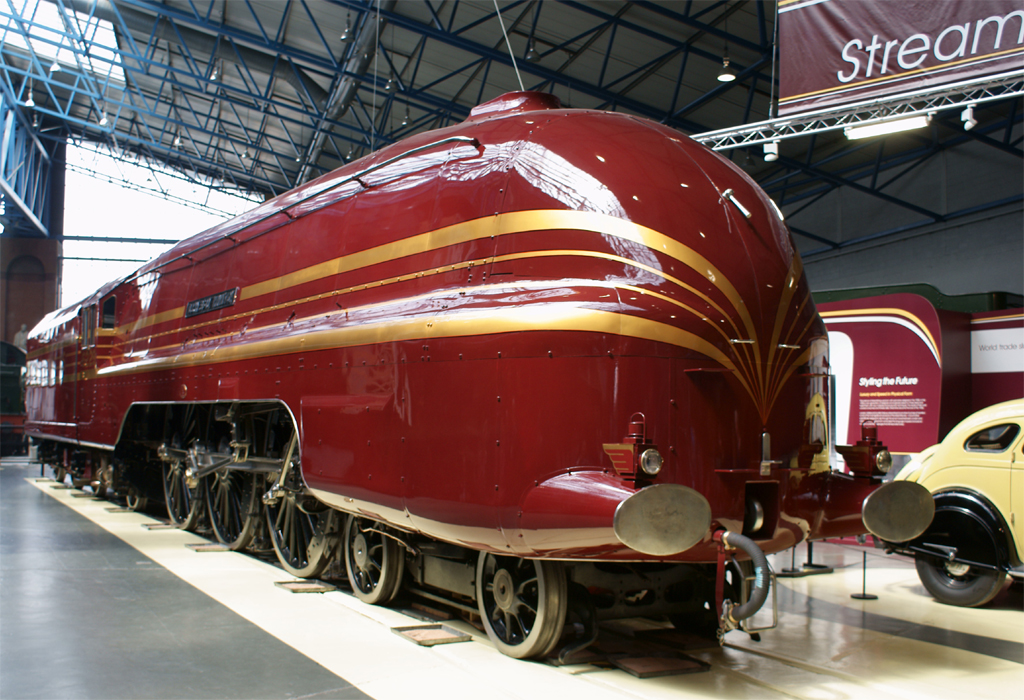
- 6229 Duchess of Hamilton on display at the National Railway Museum.
Type and origin
- Power type: Steam
- Designer: William Stanier
- Builder: LMS Crewe Works
- Build date: September 1938
Specifications
- Configuration
  - Whyte: 4-6-2
  - UIC: 2′C1′ h4
- Gauge: 4 ft 8 1/2 in (1,435 mm)
- Leading dia.: 3 ft 0 in (0.914 m)
- Driver dia.: 6 ft 9 in (2.057 m)
- Trailing dia.: 3 ft 9 in (1.143 m)
- Minimum curve: 6 chains (120 m) normal; 4 1/2 chains (91 m) dead slow
- Wheelbase: 62 ft 11 in (19.177 m)
  - Engine: 37 ft 0 in (11.278 m)
  - Drivers: 14 ft 6 in (4.420 m)
  - Tender: 15 ft 0 in (4.57 m)
- Length: Streamlined: 73 ft 9 3/4 in (22.498 m); Conventional: 73 ft 10 1/4 in (22.511 m)
- Height: 13 ft 3 in (4.039 m)
- Loco weight: Streamlined: 108.1 long tons (121 short tons; 110 t); Conventional: 105.25 long tons (117.88 short tons; 106.94 t)
- Tender weight: 56.35 long tons (63.11 short tons; 57.25 t)
- Fuel type: Coal
- Fuel capacity: 10 long tons (11.2 short tons; 10.2 t)
- Water cap.: 5,000 imp gal (23,000 L; 6,000 US gal), formerly 4,000 imp gal (18,000 L; 4,800 US gal)
- Firebox
  - Type
  - Grate area: 50 sq ft (4.6 m^{2})
- Boiler
  - Model: LMS type 1X
  - Tube plates: 19 ft 3 in (5.867 m)
  - Small tubes: 2 3/8 in (60 mm), 129 off
  - Large tubes: 5 1/8 in (130 mm), 40 off
- Boiler pressure: 250 psi (1.72 MPa)
- Heating surface
  - Firebox: 230 sq ft (21 m^{2})
  - Tubes and flues: 2,577 sq ft (239.4 m^{2})
  - Total surface: 2,807 sq ft (260.8 m^{2})
- Superheater
  - Heating area: 822 sq ft (76.4 m^{2})
- Cylinders: 4
- Cylinder size: 16 1/2 in × 28 in (419 mm × 711 mm)
- Valve gear: Walschaerts for outside cylinders with rocking shafts for inside cylinders
- Valve type: Piston valves
Performance figures
- Tractive effort: 40,000 lbf (180 kN)
Career
- Operators: London, Midland and Scottish Railway; British Railways
- Power class: LMS: 7P; BR: 8P
- Numbers: LMS: 6229; BR: 46229
- Official name: Duchess of Hamilton
- Withdrawn: February 1964
- Restored: 1980
- Disposition: Static display at the National Railway Museum

London Midland and Scottish Railway (LMS) Coronation Class 6229 (British Railways number 46229) Duchess of Hamilton is a preserved steam locomotive built in September 1938 by the LMS Crewe Works and operated until February 1964.

== Service ==
No. 6229 Duchess of Hamilton was built in 1938 at Crewe Works in Crewe as the tenth member of its class and the last in the second batch of five red streamliners (Nos. 6225-9), complete with gold speed cheat stripes, compare to the first five members (Nos. 6220-4), which have been given a unique Caledonian blue livery with silver stripes. In 1939, No. 6229 swapped identities with the first of the class 6220 Coronation and was sent to North America with a specially-constructed Coronation Scot train to appear at the 1939 New York World's Fair. There was therefore for a while a blue 6229 Duchess of Hamilton in the UK and a red No. 6220 Coronation in the USA. R.A. Riddles drove for most of the tour, owing to the illness of the assigned driver. The locomotive (though not its carriages) was shipped back from the US in 1942 after the outbreak of the Second World War, and the identities of the locomotives were swapped back in 1943. The carriages returned in 1946.

No. 6229 was painted wartime black livery in November 1944. Its streamlined casing was removed for maintenance-efficiency reasons in December 1947, and it was then given the LMS 1946 black livery. In 1948, No. 6229 passed into BR ownership and was renumbered to 46229 on 15 April that year. It was painted in the short-lived BR blue livery in April 1950, but it was soon repainted on 26 April 1952 into Brunswick green. The semi-streamlined smokebox was replaced with a round-topped smokebox in February 1957, and in September 1958 the locomotive was repainted maroon. The lining was BR style to begin with; then in October 1959, it received the current LMS style lining which it has carried since in preservation.

== Preservation ==
46229 was saved from the scrap yard along with non streamlined classmate 6233 Duchess of Sutherland, as a result of Sir Billy Butlin's efforts to place these locomotives as children's playground exhibits at his holiday camps. The third preserved member of the class 6235 City of Birmingham was donated by British Railways to Birmingham City Council for preservation within the Birmingham Industrial Museum.

Having started construction work in the winter of 1961, the new £2 million Butlins Minehead camp opened to the public on 26 May 1962. Duchess of Hamilton and LB&SCR A1 class Knowle were added in 1964, after being transported there by Pickfords.

Under a camp refurbishment and modernisation programme, the locomotives left the holiday camp in March 1975 via railhead access at Minehead railway station. In 1976, the Friends of the National Railway Museum accepted the locomotive from Butlin's on a 20-year loan deal, and immediately began to restore and preserve it. It first ran as the museum's flagship locomotive in 1980 and was operational until 1985. After purchasing the locomotive from Butlin's in 1987, after an extensive overhaul it resumed running in 1989, withdrawn from main line duty in 1996 when its 7-year boiler ticket expired.

From 1998 to 2005, No. 46229 was a static exhibit in the National Railway Museum, standing right next to Mallard. In September 2005, the National Railway Museum announced that the streamlining would be re-instated, returning the locomotive to its original appearance. This work was undertaken at Tyseley Locomotive Works and on 18 May 2009, it was returned to the National Railway Museum, going on display in a new exhibition called "Duchess of Hamilton Streamlined: Styling An Era".

== Gallery ==
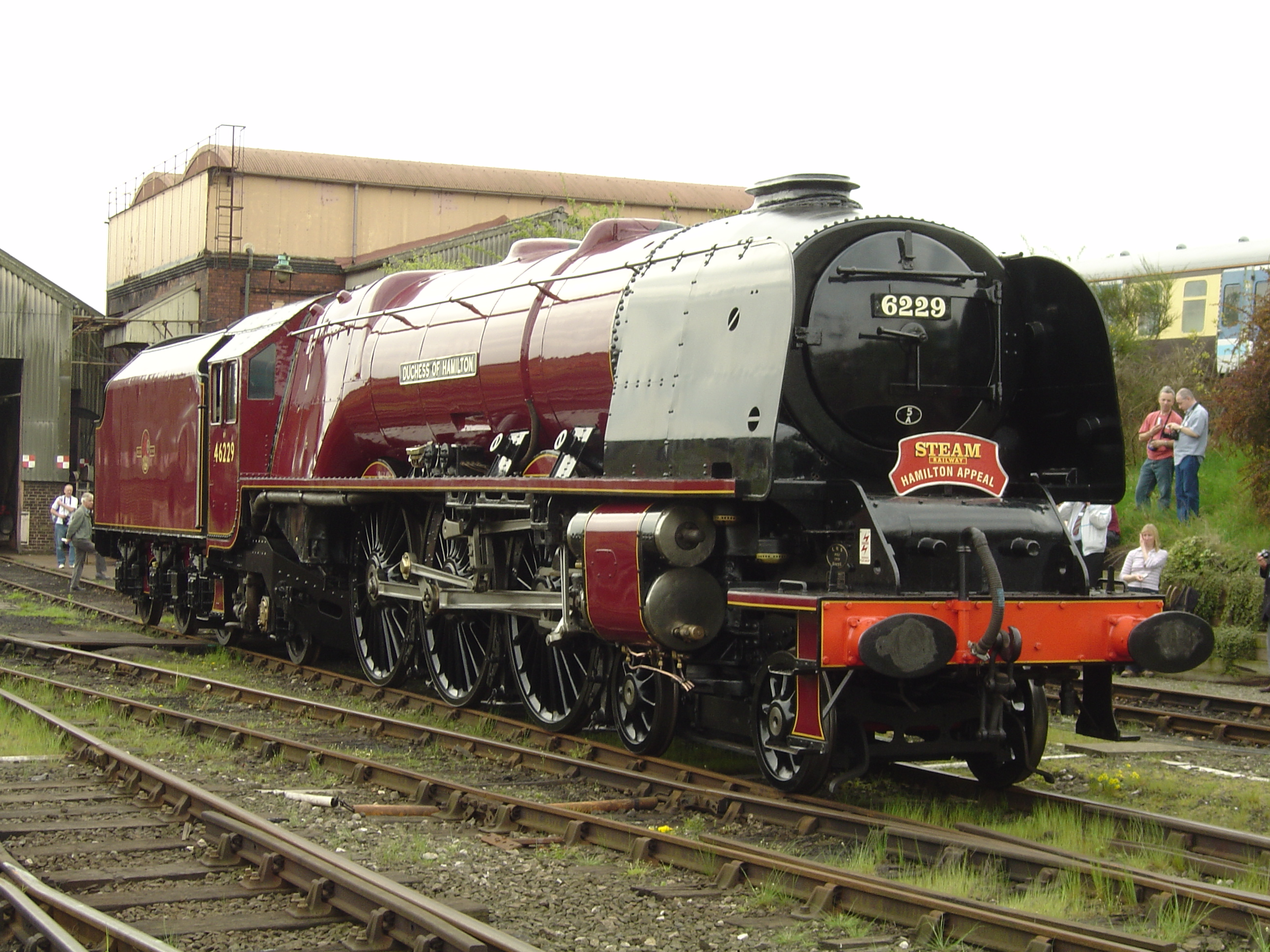
As No. 46229, Duchess of Hamilton in semi-streamlined condition at Tyseley Locomotive Works, 6 May 2006.

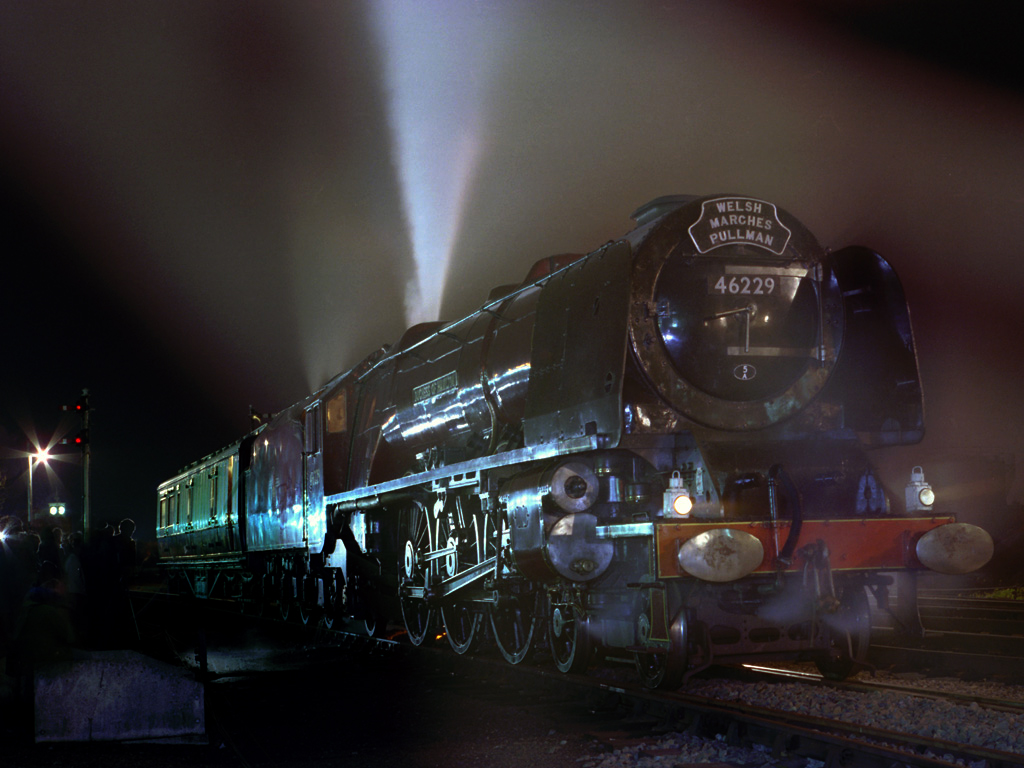
As No. 46229, Duchess of Hamilton lifts her boiler safety valves at Crewe Bank, Shrewsbury after hauling the Welsh Marches Pullman charter on 31 October 1982

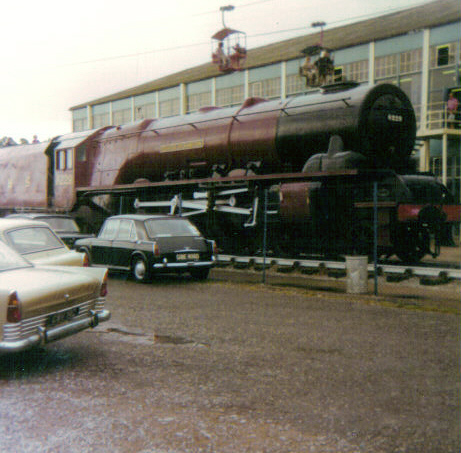
No. 6229 Duchess of Hamilton at Butlins holiday camp in Minehead, Somerset, minus smoke deflectors, 14 August 1974

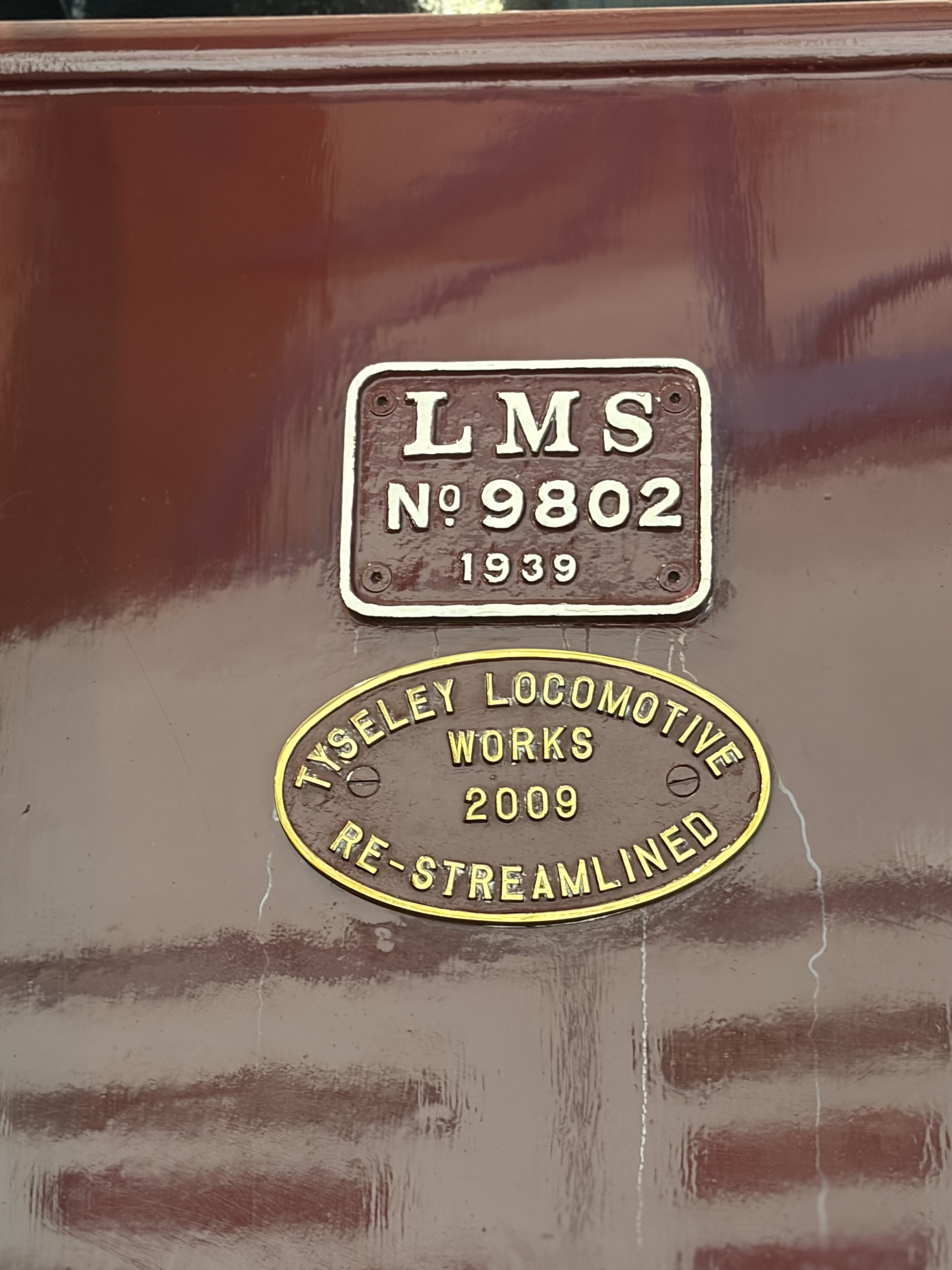
No. 6229's builders and re-streamlining plate

== Bibliography ==
- Mannion, Roger J. (1996). The Duchess: Stanier's Masterpiece (1st ed.). Alan Sutton Publishing Ltd. ISBN 0-7509-0903-X.
