= Heritage Railway Association =

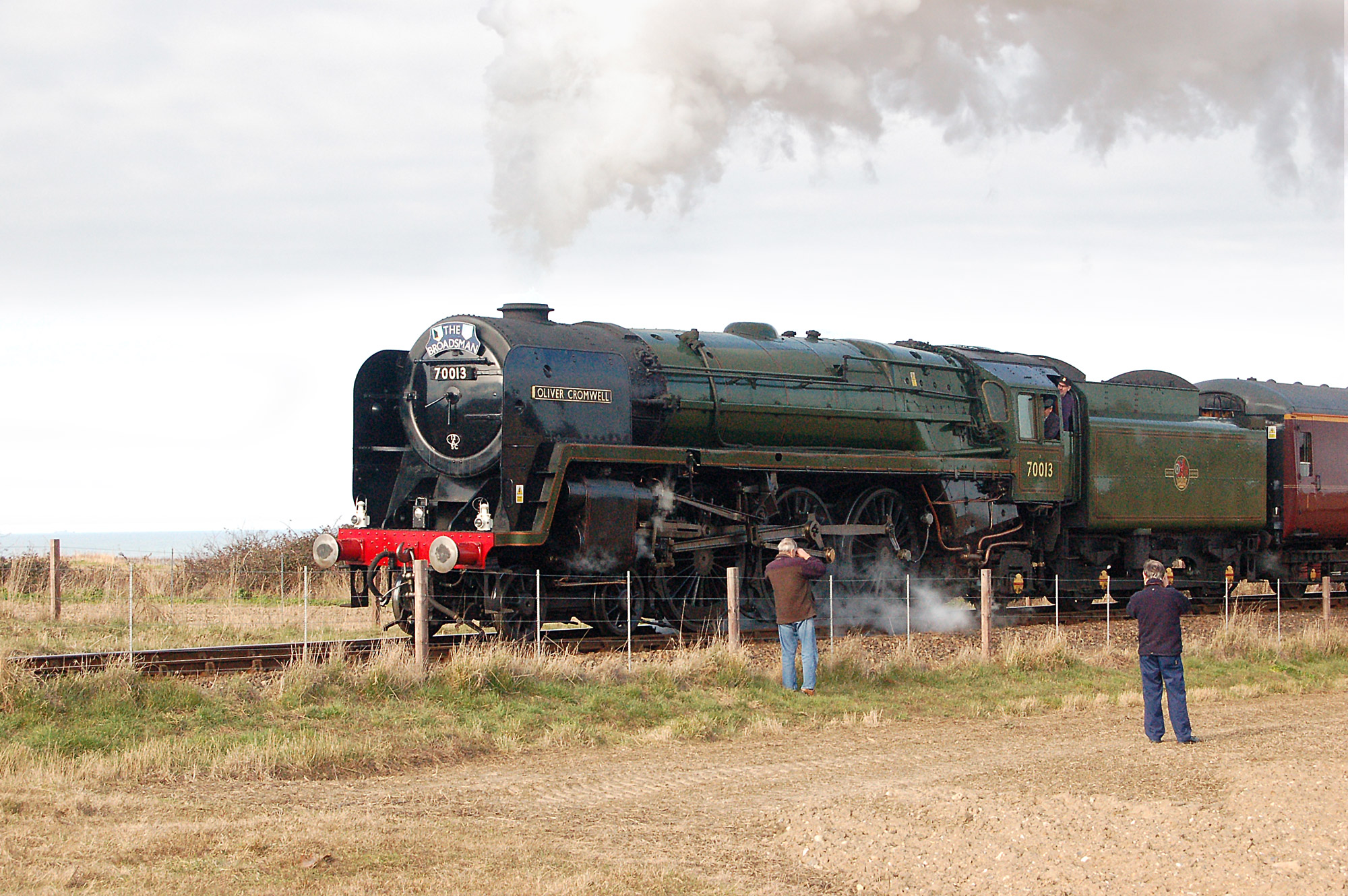
Preserved 7MT 70013 Oliver Cromwell approaching Weybourne on the North Norfolk Railway on 11 March 2010

Heritage Railway Association (HRA) is an umbrella organisation representing the majority of the heritage and tourist railways, railway museums, steam centres and railway preservation groups in the UK and Ireland.

Groups and individuals involved with the preservation of stations and other railway buildings, and private individuals are also welcomed to join as Friends of the Association.

The HRA organises several annual awards and competitions to further railway preservation in the UK, and also maintains various databases, such as that of preserved locomotives — currently numbering over 2500 items — and others holding the details of every known heritage carriage and wagon.

The trophies awarded for three awards are lent to the HRA by the National Railway Museum (NRM), based at York. The trophy for the Annual Award is a coat of arms from the locomotive of a royal train on the London, Brighton & South Coast Railway. The Small Groups Award is a carved panel from a coach provided for Queen Victoria by the Great Western. The John Coiley Award, for locomotive preservation, is a Hackworth-designed locomotive spring safety-valve, as used on the original Stockton and Darlington Railway in the 1830s.

Although the HRA is not a registered charity, many of its 250 member organisations are.

== Mission statement ==
The aims and objectives of the HRA are set out in eight items:

# To represent its members' interests to Government and other bodies.

1. To maintain high standards by requiring members to conform to the HRA Code of Practice.
2. To provide professional advice, a full information service and other such help and assistance as may be appropriate.
3. To provide a forum for sharing information and experience by organising open meetings and seminars.
4. To help members to develop their business.
5. To encourage and assist members to develop education policies and practices.
6. To encourage excellence by organising awards and competitions.
7. To encourage and advise members on the heritage aspects of their activities, including establishing and maintaining rational collecting, interpretation and archiving policies.

== Member services ==
The HRA provides a number of services to its members, including FEDECRAIL (European Federation of Museum & Tourist Railways) Representation, Overseas and Tourist Board Liaison, information on suppliers, and a regular newsletter.

The HRA also offers advice and guidance on a wide range of topics, such as Catering, Education, Engineering, Funding, Legal matters, Operating Railways and Safety.

== See also ==
- List of British heritage and private railways
- List of closed railway stations in Britain
- British narrow gauge railways
- Great Little Trains of Wales
- Railway enthusiasts societies in the United Kingdom
