= David Jenkinson =

British model railway enthusiast (1934–2004)

- Born: 6 August 1934; Leeds, England
- Died: 27 April 2004 (aged 69)
- Education: Prince Henry's Grammar School
- Alma mater: University of London
- Occupations: Railway modeller; Writer
- Employer: National Railway Museum
- Spouse: Sheila Jenkinson
- Children: 4
- Military career
- Allegiance: United Kingdom
- Service: Royal Air Force
- Service years: 1956–1972
- Rank: Squadron Leader

David Jenkinson (6 August 1934 – 27 April 2004) was a railway modeller and historian, who had a particular interest in the London, Midland and Scottish Railway (LMS) and was president of the LMS Society.

== Biography ==
Jenkinson was born in Leeds and educated at Prince Henry's Grammar School, Otley. In 1951, the school took him on a field trip to the Settle–Carlisle line (S&C), which would start a lengthy relationship with that line. He went to London University, where he met his future wife Sheila, with whom he had four children (Christopher, Hilary, Timothy and Nicola).

After graduating Jenkinson joined the Royal Air Force (RAF) in 1956, from which he retired in 1972 having achieved the rank of Squadron Leader. During this time he built his 4 mm scale EM gauge models Marthwaite and Garsdale Road (see Garsdale) representing a station on the S&C set during the 1930s period when it was run by the LMS.

In 1963, with Bob Essery and others he founded the LMS Society. Alone and with Essery he authored many books, the most important was their book on LMS Coaches, which was groundbreaking in its treatment of a non-locomotive subject.

Soon after the Science Museum was asked to take on the historic railway collections, David, having retired from the RAF, applied for and was appointed as an education officer with the Science Museum at South Kensington, where he worked with John Van Riemsdijk on the layout of the new building in York. He subsequently became Head of Education and Research at the resulting National Railway Museum (NRM), where he was responsible for refurbishment to running condition of major locomotives and vehicles, so that national tours would promote the museum. He left the NRM in 1988, after management changes.

He put some of the time thus freed into his writing career and was editor of BackTrack from 1989 to 1994, in succession to the magazine's founder, Nigel Trevena, of Atlantic Transport Publishers. Jenkinson set up Pendragon Publishing in 1991 as a separate entity within Atlantic and retained it when he split with them in 1995. In partnership with Michael Blakemore, Pendragon bought BackTrack from Atlantic in 2003.

In the year he left the RAF he started his layout Little Long Drag, which incorporated Garsdale Road and a lengthy run in a custom-built shed. Later he switched to 7 mm scale modelling, building Kendal, Kendal II and Kendal Branch the latter based on an imaginary ex-Midland Railway line in the early Grouping era (c.1928-30).

Much of his railway modelling stock was sold at auction by Christie's in 2005.

== Publications ==
- Extract from LMS Society bibliography
- York University Library catalogue entries
- D Jenkinson & R J Essery (1967) Locomotive Liveries of the LMS Ian Allan ISBN 0-7110-0305-X
- D Jenkinson & N Campling (ed) (1969) Historic Carriage Drawings B Ian Allan ISBN 0-7110-0053-0
- D Jenkinson & R J Essery (1969) The LMS Coach Ian Allan ISBN 0-7110-0074-3
- V R Anderson, R J Essery & D Jenkinson (1971) Portrait of the LMS Peco ISBN 0-900586-32-X
- D Jenkinson (1973) Rails in the Fells Peco ISBN 0-900586-42-7 . Second revised edition, 1980, ISBN 0-900586-53-2.
- D Jenkinson & J Bellwood (1976) Gresley & Stanier D Jenkinson & J Bellwood ISBN 0-11-290438-6
- D Jenkinson & R J Essery (1977) LMS Coaches 1923 - 57 Oxford Publishing Company ISBN 0-902888-83-8
- D Jenkinson (1980) The Power of the Duchesses Oxford Publishing Company ISBN 0-86093-063-7
- D Jenkinson & R J Essery (1981) LMS Locomotives Vol 1 General Review Oxford Publishing Company ISBN 0-86093-087-4
- D Jenkinson & G Townend (1981) Palaces on wheels HMSO ISBN 0-11-290366-5
- D Jenkinson (1982) Profile of the Duchesses Oxford Publishing Company ISBN 0-86093-176-5
- D Jenkinson (1982) The Power of The Royal Scots Oxford Publishing Company ISBN 0-86093-175-7
- D Jenkinson & R J Essery (1984) Midland Carriages (1877 0nwards) ISBN 0-86093-291-5 Oxford Publishing Company
- D Jenkinson & R J Essery (1984) Midland Locomotives from 1883 Vol 1 General Survey Wild Swan Publications ISBN 0-906867-27-4
- D Jenkinson & R J Essery (1985) LMS Locomotives Vol 2 Pre group Western & Central Div Oxford Publishing Company ISBN 0-86093-264-8
- D Jenkinson (1985) Modelling Historic Railways Patrick Stevens Ltd ISBN 0-85059-731-5
- R J Essery & D Jenkinson (1986) LMS Locomotives Vol 3 Absorbed Pre-Group Classes, Northern Division ISBN 1-85794-024-5
- D Jenkinson & R J Essery (1987) LMS Locomotives Vol 4 Pre group Midland Silver Link ISBN 0-947971-16-5
- D Jenkinson (1988) Eric Treacy's LMS Oxford Publishing Company ISBN 0-86093-381-4
- D Jenkinson & R J Essery (1988) Midland Locomotives from 1883 Vol 2 Passenger Tender Wild Swan Publications ISBN 0-906867-59-2
- D Jenkinson & R J Essery (1988) Midland Locomotives from 1883 Vol 3 Tank Engines Wild Swan Publications ISBN 0-906867-66-5
- D Jenkinson (1988) The London & Birmingham Capital ISBN 1-85414-102-3
- D Jenkinson & R J Essery (1989) LMS Locomotives Vol 5 Post group standards Silver Link ISBN 0-947971-39-4
- D Jenkinson & R J Essery (1989) Midland Locomotives from 1883 Vol 4 Goods Tender Wild Swan Publications ISBN 0-906867-74-6
- D Jenkinson & R J Essery (1991) LMS Standard Coaching Stock Vol 1 General Intro & NPCS Oxford Publishing Company ISBN 0-86093-450-0
- D Jenkinson (1993) Bedtime Backtrack Atlantic Transport Publishers ISBN 0-906899-58-3
- D Jenkinson & R J Essery (1994) LMS Locomotives Vol 3 Pre group Northern Div Silver Link ISBN 1-85794-024-5
- D Jenkinson & R J Essery (1994) LMS Standard Coaching Stock Vol 2 Gen Service Gangwayed vehicles Oxford Publishing Company ISBN 0-86093-451-9
- J Edgington, J Smart & D Jenkinson (1994) The Big Four in Colour 1935 -50 Atlantic Transport Publishers ISBN 0-906899-62-1
- D Jenkinson (1995) LNWR Carriages Pendragon ISBN 1-899816-01-1
- D Jenkinson (1996) Carriage Modelling Made easy Wild Swan Publications ISBN 1-874103-32-1
- D Jenkinson & B C Lane (1996) British Railcars 1900-1950 Atlantic Transport Publishers ISBN 0-906899-64-8
- D Jenkinson The History of British Railway Carriages, 1900-53. Pendragon Publishers. 1996. ISBN 1899816038.
- D Jenkinson & A Earnshaw (1997) Last Years of the Big Four Atlantic Transport Publishers ISBN 0-906899-79-6
- D Jenkinson (1998) Historic Carriage Drawings Vol 2 Pendragon ISBN 1-899816-06-2
- D Jenkinson (1999) The Big Four in Colour Pendragon ISBN 1-899816-08-9
- D Jenkinson (2000) Historical Railway Modelling Pendragon ISBN 1-899816-10-0
- D Jenkinson & R J Essery (2000) LMS Standard Coaching Stock Vol 3 Non Corridor & Special purpose Oxford Publishing Company ISBN 0-86093-452-7
