= The Forsythe Collection =

The Forsythe Collection refers to a collection of railway and transport ephemera owned and curated by transport enthusiast Robert Forsythe and his wife, Fiona. The collection is extensive and includes materials in three public repositories. Of the material now in public ownership or curation, the largest collection is in the National Railway Museum at York's Search Engine Archive. The central theme of the collection is the ephemera of travel and transport, especially driven by the recognized concept of Grey Literature.

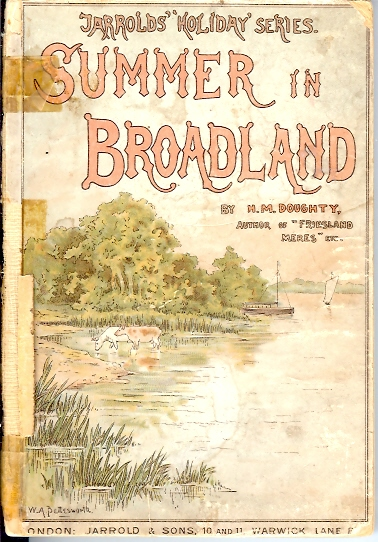
Summer in Broadland by H M Doughty. Jarrold edition of 1890.

== Origins ==
The Forsythe Collection likely traces its origins to the early 20th century. James Forsythe (1916-2004), father of Robert Forsythe (1959-), grew up traveling within the British Empire, developing an interest in stamp collecting. Robert Forsythe started to collect railway timetables in 1971, and the earliest letters establishing this collection survive at the Norfolk Record Office. Both of those historic collections remain part of the Forsythe Collection.

As Robert Forsythe pursued a career as a museum curator, he married Fiona Forsythe, a librarian. Together, they established a network of contributors and developed what the railway community recognized as a significant and remarkable collection. During house moves, certain items from the family's collections found their way to public repositories. Notably, the Papers of Major James A. Forsythe, MBE (1916-2004), are housed at the Norfolk Record Office and the Cambridge University Centre of South Asian Studies.

== Transfer to National Railway Museum ==
The transfer of materials from the Forsythe Collection to the National Railway Museum at York occurred in two instances, first in January 2009 and then again in January 2012. Approximately 100 meters of shelved material were moved during these transfers. The focus of the transfer was on the grey literature components of the Forsythe Collection, specifically related to Transport and Travel ephemera, as designated at the museum. This included items such as timetables, leaflets, handbills, and brochures, but generally excluded items covered by ISBN (International Standard Book Number), such as books and guidebooks. Additionally, posters, tickets, postcards, and extensive model railway interests were not included in the transfer and remained under the possession of the Forsythe family. Subsequently, materials were used in the first APP generated at the museum. Another selective mention is of the material used in The Track Stars Exhibition in 2012.
