= John Van Riemsdijk =

British curator

- Born: 13 November 1924; Muswell Hill, Hornsey, Middlesex, England
- Died: 31 August 2008 (aged 83)
- Education: UCS
- Alma mater: Birkbeck College
- Occupation: Museum Curator
- Known for: Model Engineering
- Military career
- Allegiance: United Kingdom
- Branch: Royal Navy
- Unit: SOE
- Conflict: World War II

John Van Riemsdijk (13 November 1924 – 31 August 2008) was a curator of the Science Museum in London. He was instrumental in establishing the National Railway Museum (NRM) in the years before 1975. He was a model engineer and author. When he died in 2008, The Guardian published an obituary about him.

== Biography ==
Van Riemsdijk was born in 1924 to a Dutch father and an English mother. He attended University College School, Hampstead, and Birkbeck College, London, where he read English and French. Soon after graduating he was recruited into the Royal Navy.

Combining his knowledge of continental Europe and his practical inventive skills saw him recruited in World War II into the Special Operations Executive.

Prior to joining the Science Museum in 1954, he made a name for himself in the model railway world with a geared clockwork mechanism. This was marketed as the Walker Riemsdijk mechanism. The Walker element referring to the London shop of Walkers & Holtzapffel in whose catalogue it was featured.

During the design of the NRM he worked closely with David Jenkinson.

He became an acknowledged expert in the history and practice of the Compound locomotive.

== Memberships ==
He held memberships of the Newcomen Society, Stephenson Locomotive Society, the Bevil's Club, and the office of a vice-president of the Gauge One Model Railway Association.
