= National Railway Museum =

Railway museum in York, England

- The Great Hall of the National Railway Museum

- Location within North Yorkshire
- Established: 1975; 51 years ago
- Location: Leeman Road, York, England
- Coordinates: 53°57′35″N 1°05′52″W
- Type: Railway museum
- Visitors: 656,205 in 2025
- Director: Judith McNicol
- Website: www.railwaymuseum.org.uk

Science Museum Group
- National Railway Museum; Locomotion Museum; Science & Media; Science & Industry; Science Museum; Dana Research Centre and Library; National Collections Centre

The National Railway Museum (NRM) is a museum in York, England, forming part of the Science Museum Group. The museum tells the story of rail transport in Britain and its impact on society. It is the home of the national collection of historically significant railway vehicles such as Mallard, a Stirling 'Single', Duchess of Hamilton and a Japanese bullet train. In addition, the National Railway Museum holds a diverse collection of other objects, from a household recipe book used in George Stephenson's house to film showing a "never-stop railway" developed for the British Empire Exhibition. It has won many awards, including the European Museum of the Year Award in 2001.

The museum closed for large-scale renovations in 2009. A new entrance building was added to connect the two wings of the museum and the area around the museum underwent landscaping.

In 2020, the architecture firm Feilden Fowles won an international competition to create the museum's new £16.5 million Central Hall building—a key element of the museum's Vision 2025 masterplan. In January 2023, the museum's Station Hall (a Grade II listed "former goods station built between 1875–77") was closed until September 2025 for "urgent structural repair" which was to include the installation of a new roof over that area.

The Station Hall reopened in 2025 following an £11 million refurbishment, with a redesigned layout intended to better integrate historical narratives and enhance the visitor experience.

== Overview ==
The National Railway Museum has over 6,000 objects on display of which around 100 are locomotives or rolling stock which tell the stories for Britain's railway innovation. The collection also includes fine jewellery worn by the Railway Queens, models of planes, boats and hovercraft, and experimental technologies such as Louis Brennan's Gyroscopic Mono-rail car.

It is the largest museum of its type in Britain, attracting 656,205 visitors in 2025. The largest in the world in terms of floor area of exhibition buildings is the French Cité du Train in Mulhouse, although this attracts far fewer visitors than the National Railway Museum.

The National Railway Museum was established on its present site, the former York North locomotive depot, in 1975, when it took over the former British Railways collection located in Clapham and the York Railway Museum located off Queen Street, immediately to the southeast of the railway station; since then, the collection has continued to grow.

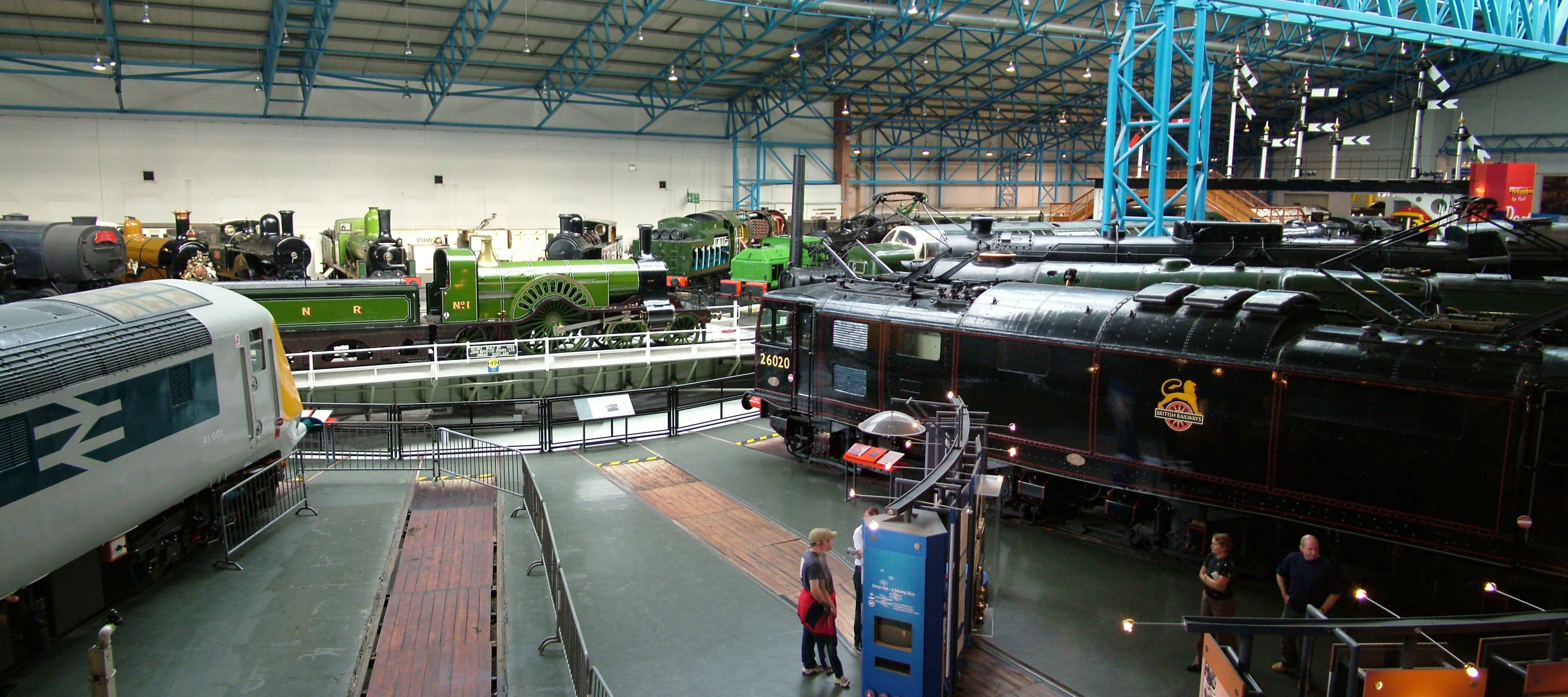
A panorama of locomotives arranged around the turntable in the Great Hall

The museum is within walking distance of York railway station. A "roadtrain" runs from the city centre (near York Minster) to the museum on Leeman Road during summer months and school holidays. The York park and ride also serves the museum. Admission has been free since 2001. It is open daily from 10 am to 5 pm during February half-term holiday, then Wednesday to Sunday only from 10 am to 5 pm.

Locomotion – the National Railway Museum in Shildon, County Durham was opened in October 2004 and is operated by the NRM in conjunction with Durham County Council. It houses more of the National Collection in a new building and a historic site around the former workshop of Timothy Hackworth and in the most recent full year for which figures have been published (2011–2012), it attracted more than 210,000 visitors.

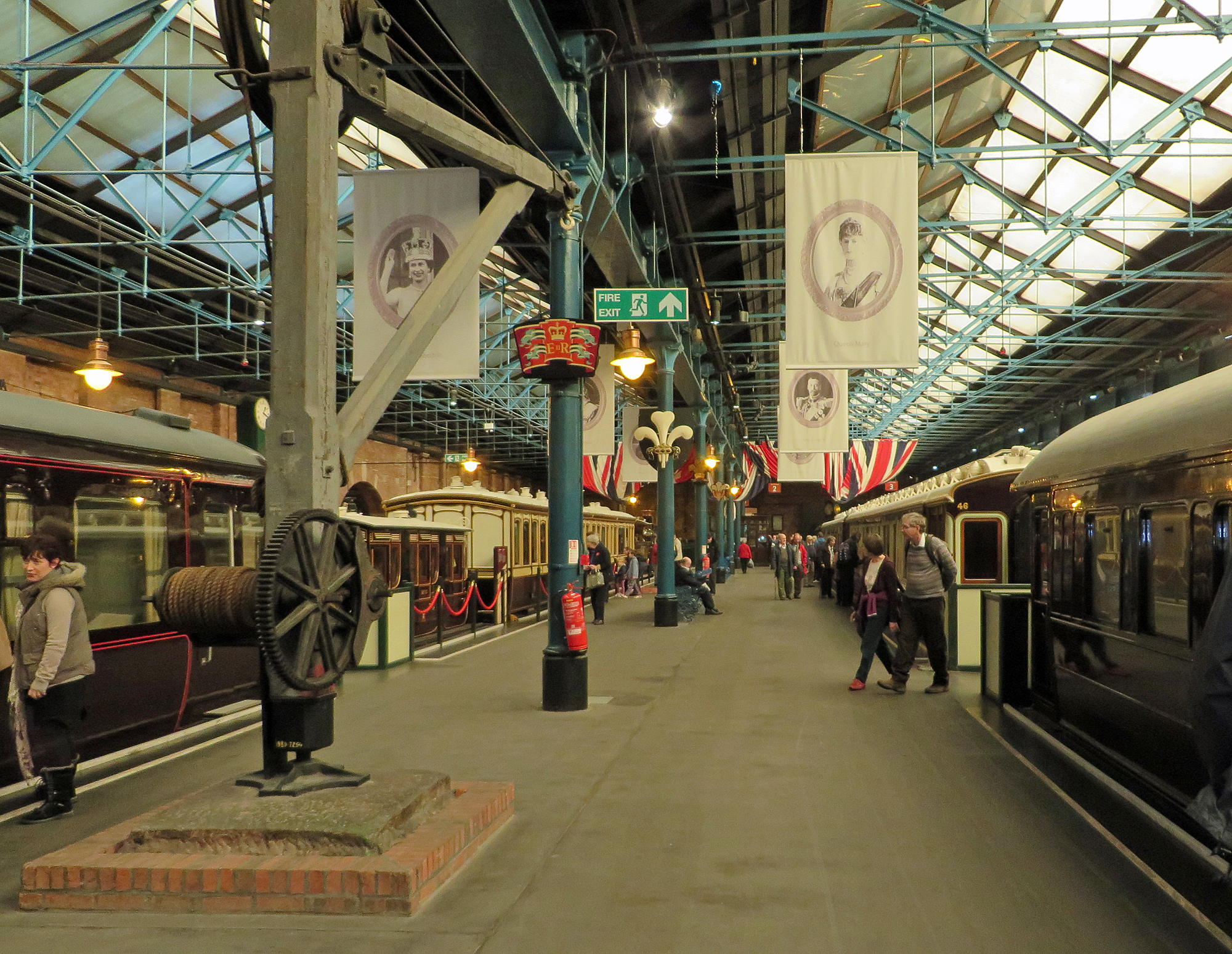
A section of Station Hall, 2013

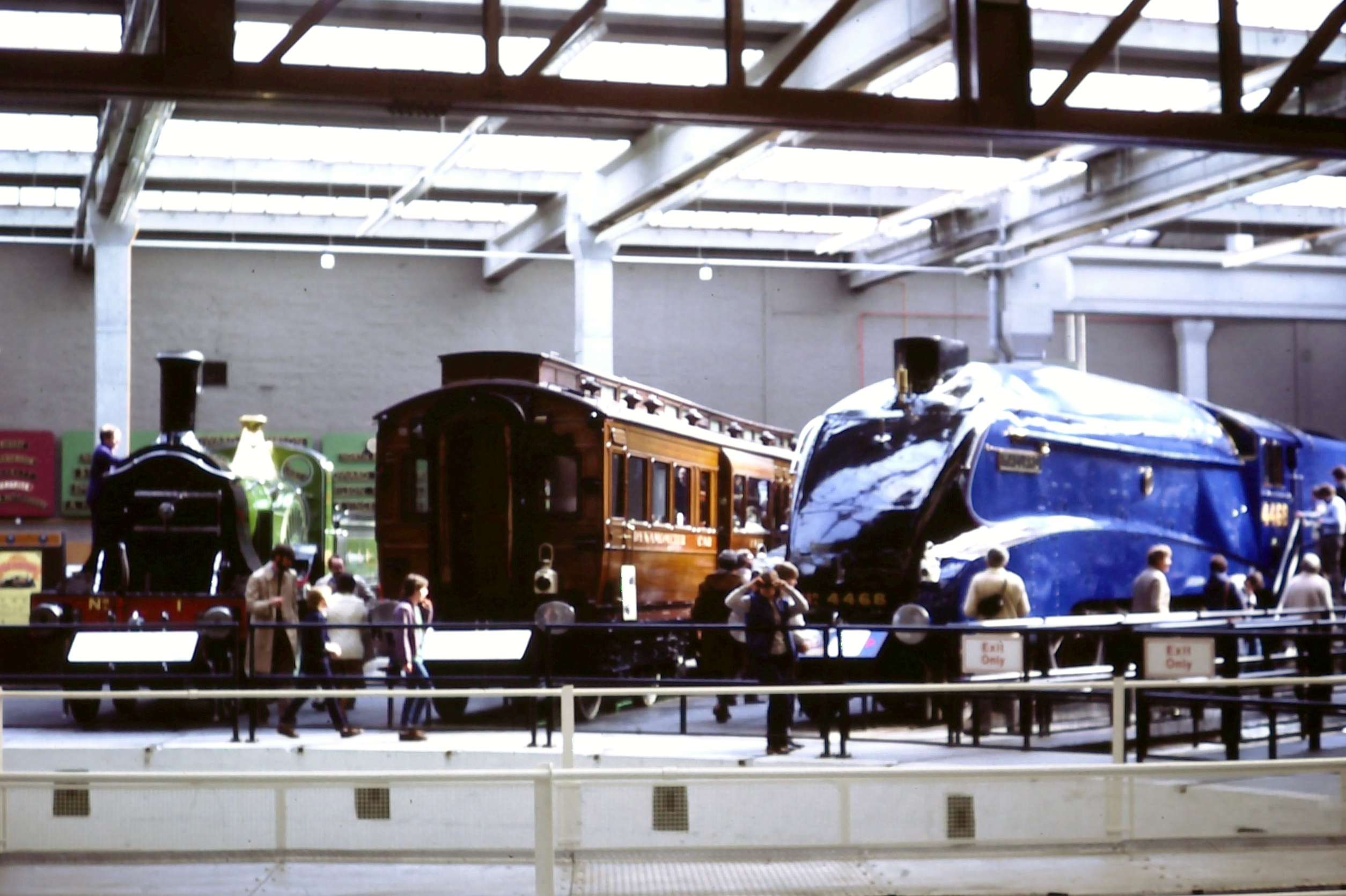
The Great Hall (1981)

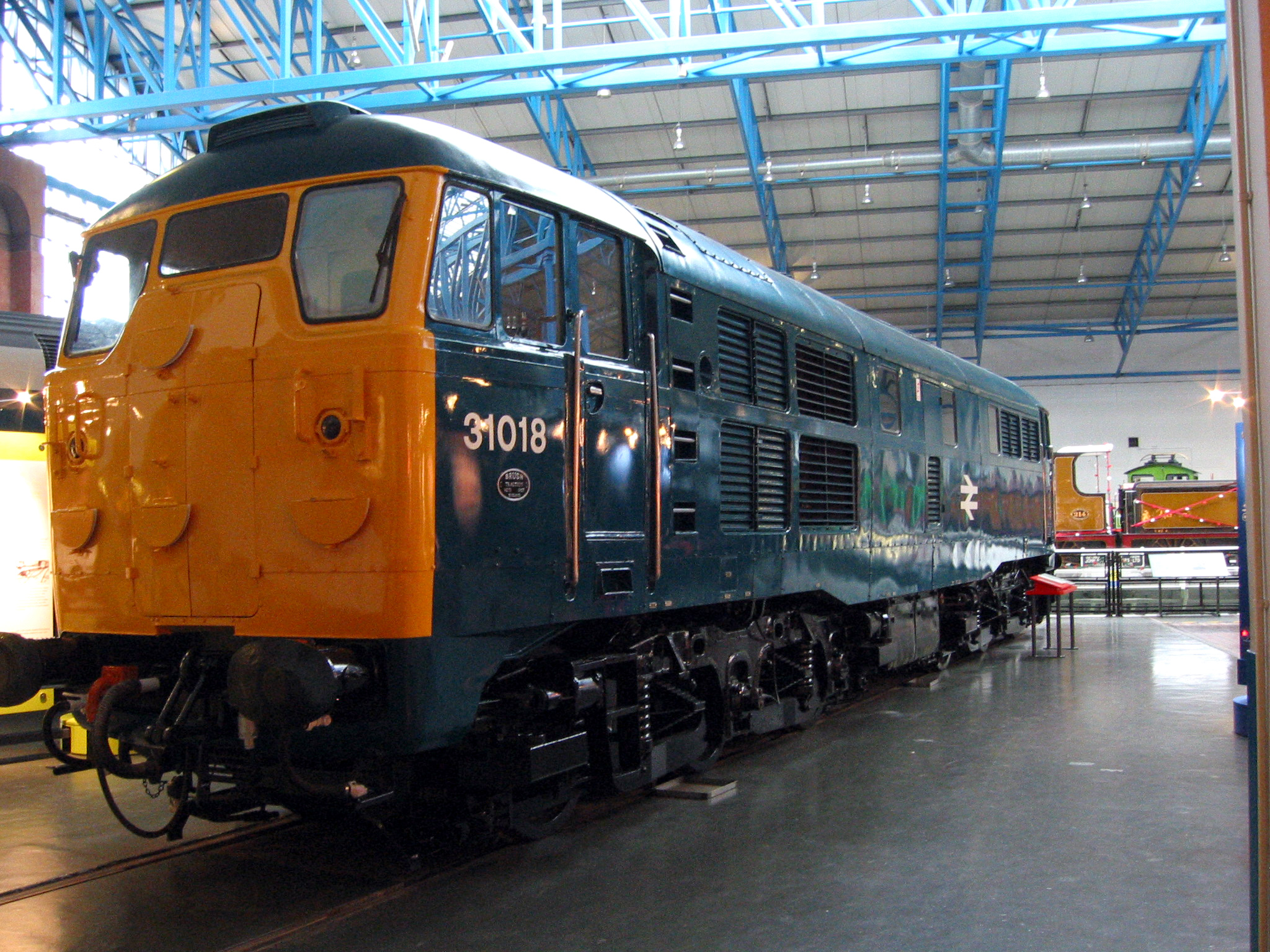
Class 31 No. 31018 on display in the Great Hall (2006)

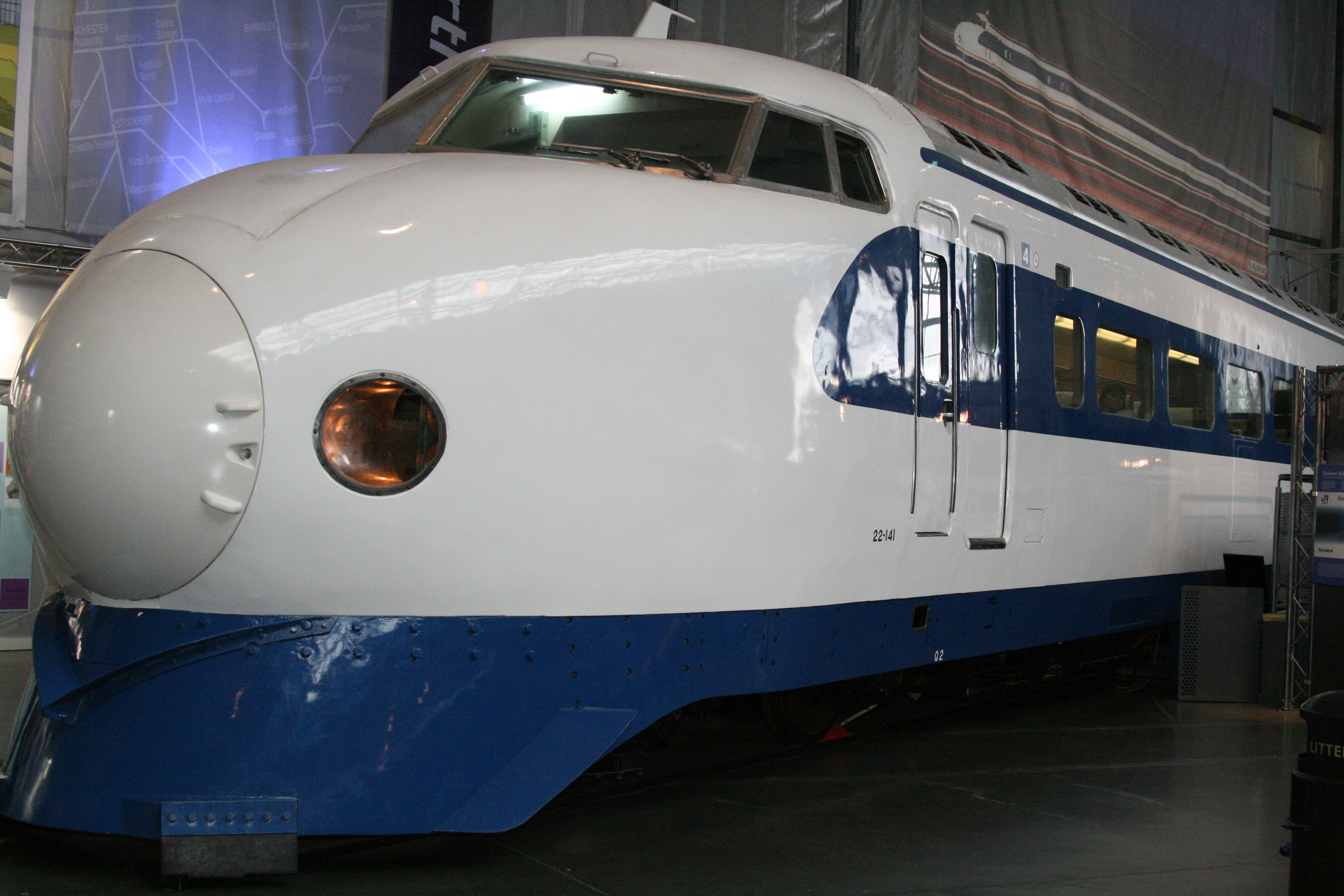
A Japanese 0 Series Shinkansen (No.22-141) at the NRM (2007)

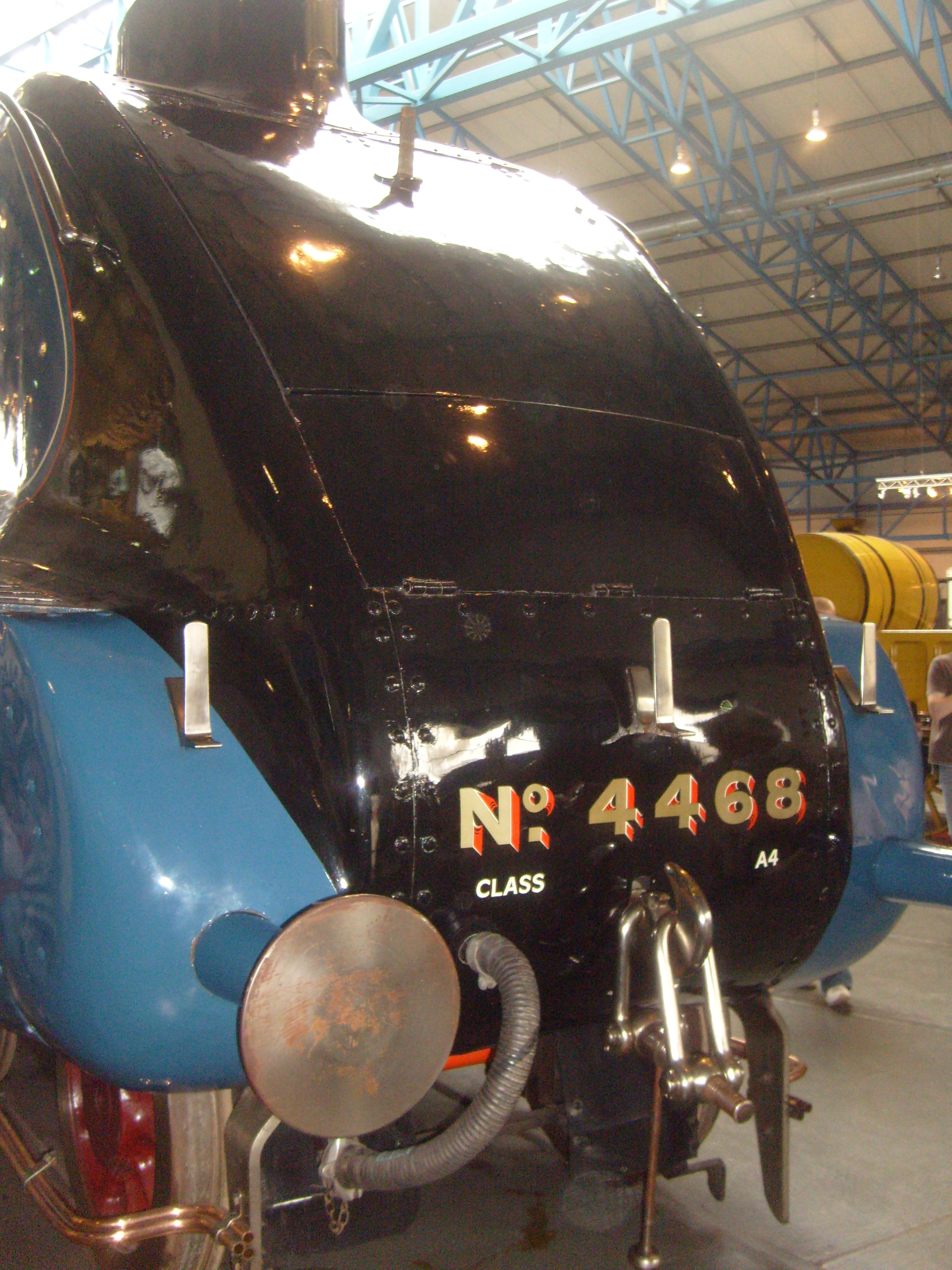
4468 Mallard at the National Railway Museum York (2009)

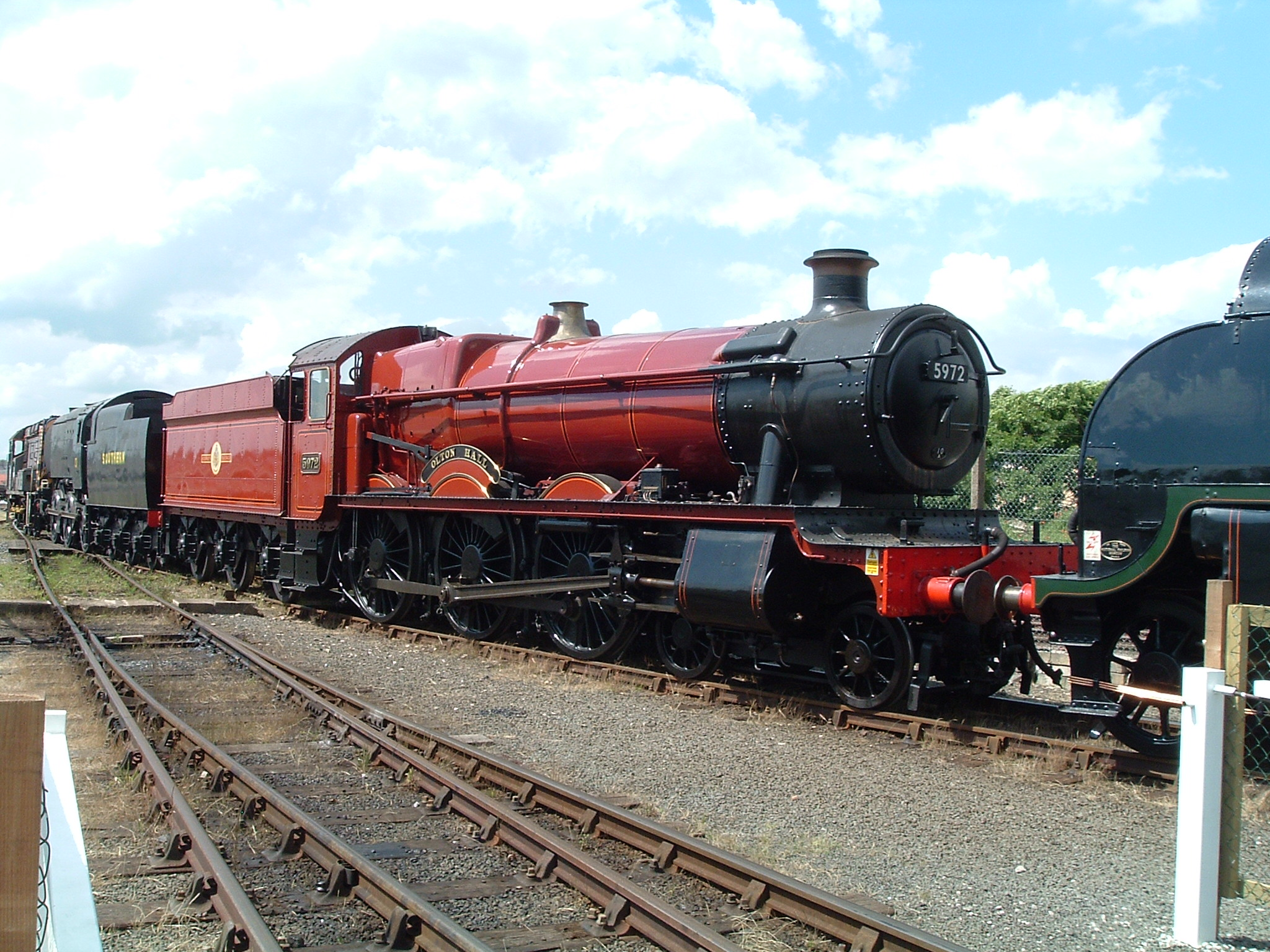
Visiting Hogwarts Express engine 5972 Olton Hall (2004)

Statue of George Stephenson in the Great Hall

== National Collection ==
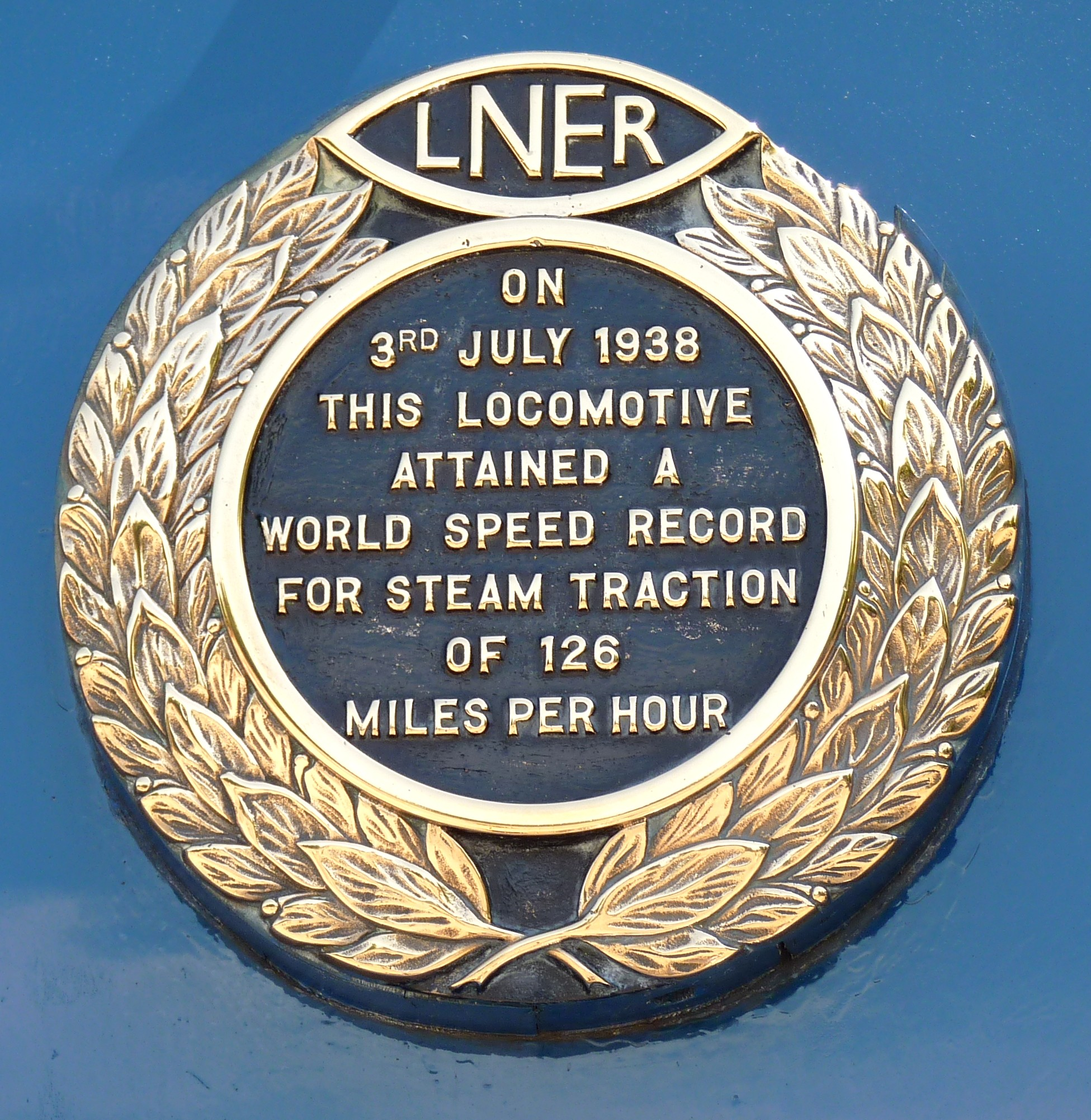
Mallard record plate

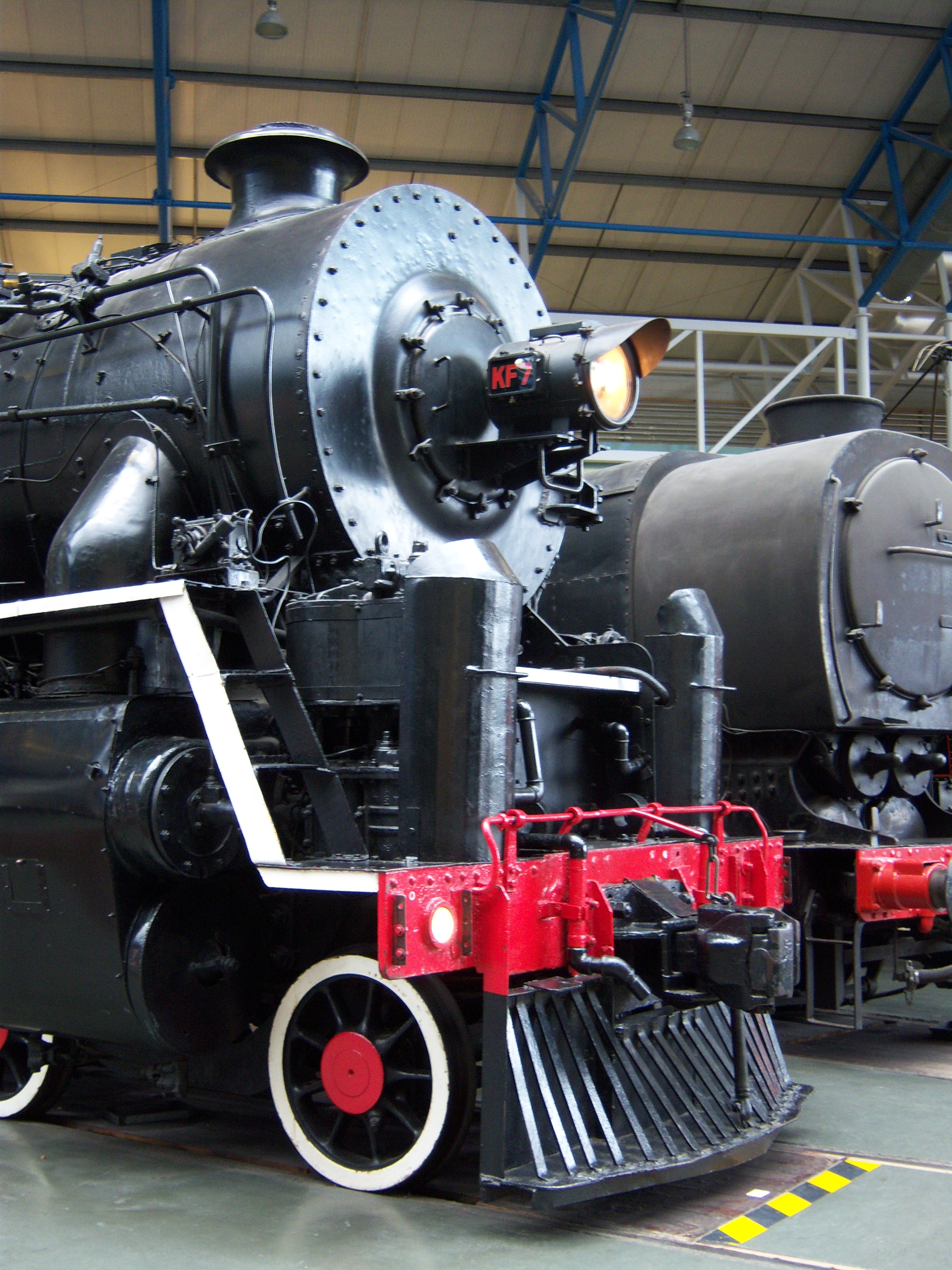
China Railways KF No. 607

There are approximately 280 rail vehicles in the National Collection, with around 100 being at York at any one time and the remainder divided between Locomotion at Shildon and other museums and heritage railways. The earliest are wagonway vehicles of about 1815. The permanent display includes "Palaces on Wheels", a collection of Royal Train saloons from Queen Victoria's early trains through to those used by Queen Elizabeth II up to the 1970s, among them some of the first rail vehicles to be set aside for preservation. Other key exhibits normally to be seen at York include the 1846 Furness Railway No. 3 "Coppernob" locomotive, and the more modern express passenger steam locomotives London and North Eastern Railway Class A3 No. 4472 Flying Scotsman (added to the collection in 2004), its streamlined sister Class A4 No. 4468 Mallard and London, Midland and Scottish Railway Princess Coronation Class No. 6229 Duchess of Hamilton. Flying Scotsman is among the exhibits intended for operation on the National Rail network from time to time.

The museum has imported several major vehicles for display: the Chinese Class KF7 4-8-4 locomotive donated in 1981 was built in Britain and the Wagons-Lits sleeping car donated in 1980 had been used on the Paris-London Night Ferry service. The single exception to the rule of exhibits associated with Britain is the Japanese 0 Series Shinkansen leading vehicle which was donated to the museum by the West Japan Railway Company in 2001 and which now forms part of an award-winning display, and is one of only two Shinkansen vehicles on exhibit outside Japan.

Rail vehicles on display are exchanged from time to time with other organisations, and examples of new-build stock from the current industry sometimes visit the museum for short periods.

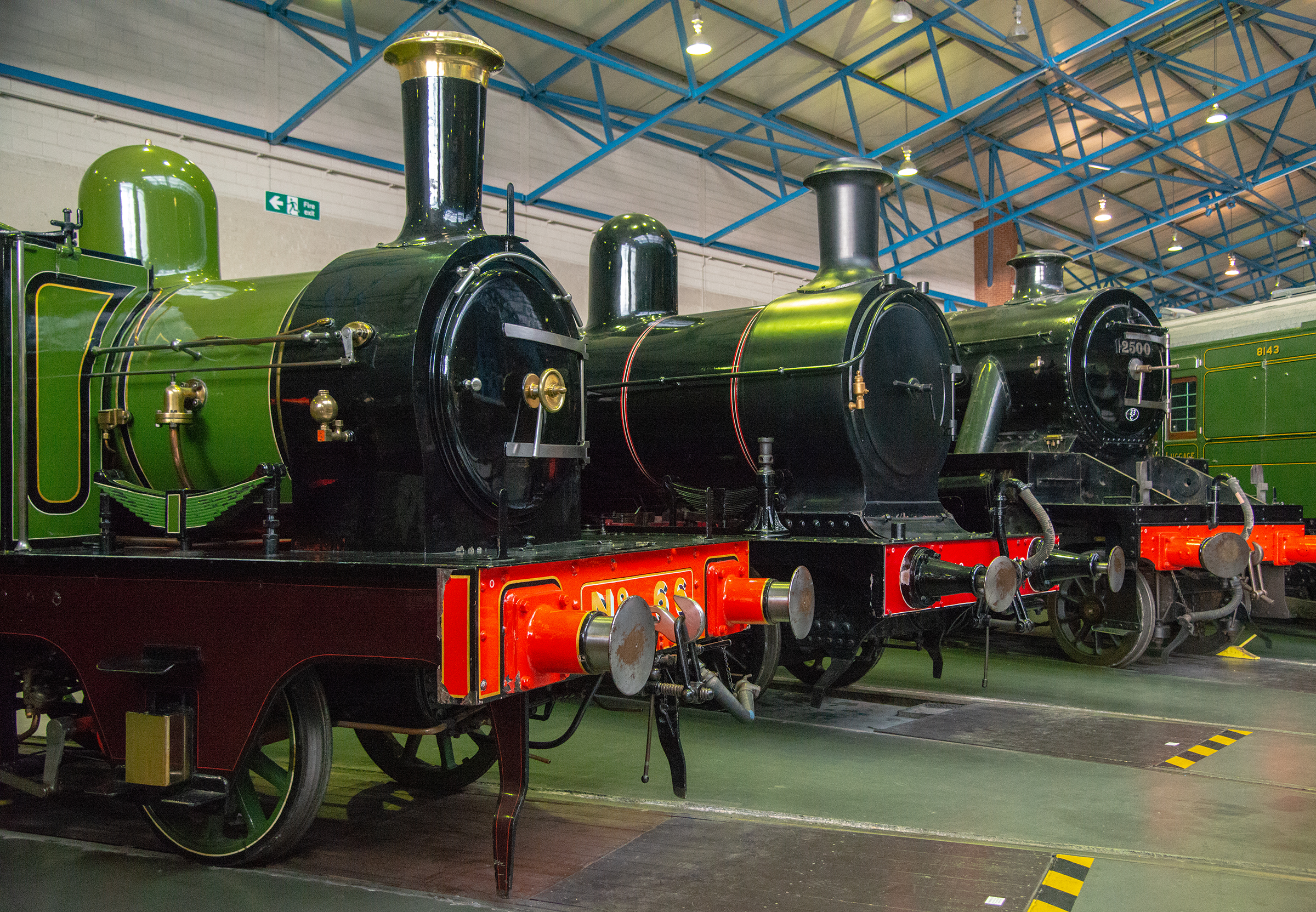
Some of the locomotives on display at the National Railway Museum, York

Other physically large exhibits are the Stockton and Darlington Railway Gaunless Bridge and several stationary winding engines used on railway inclines.

The many other two and three-dimensional elements of the collection include signalling equipment, road vehicles, ship models, posters, drawings and other artwork, tickets, nameplates, staff uniforms, clocks, watches, furniture and equipment from railway companies' hotels, refreshment rooms and offices (including company seals) and a wide range of models, some of which are operated on the museum's O scale model railway (originated in 1982).

=== Search Engine ===
The National Railway Museum holds a large open library and archive of railway related material. This includes an internationally significant collection of locomotive and rolling stock engineering drawings from railway works and independent manufacturing companies. Copies of many of these engineering drawings are sold to the heritage railway movement to assist with their new build locomotive and restoration projects. They are also sold to modellers who can use the drawing to produce accurate scale models. The library holds more than 20,000 books and 800 journals of which around 300 are active. The archive also holds a large collection of technical and test records, as well as timetables including a large number of Bradshaw timetables. The archives also hold some 1.75 million photographs covering the earliest era of photography to the modern day. These include official collections from railway companies and collections from enthusiasts like Eric Treacy and H. Gordon Tidey.

In 1999/2000 the Museum began to collect recordings of former railway staff for a National Archive of Railway Oral History. It also holds the archive of steam train recordings by Peter Handford. In 2009 The Forsythe Collection of travel and transport ephemera was acquired for the collection. Many of the museum's artworks and posters can also be viewed through Search Engine although these are now displayed in a series of temporary exhibitions in the museum's new art gallery which opened in 2011.

The Search Engine facility opened in late 2007 and is open from 10:00 to 17:30 Wednesday to Saturday. The archive and library collections can be viewed by anyone without an appointment although the website recommends pre-booking archive materials at least 24 hours in advance. The majority of its collections have been listed on its website for people to view what materials are available prior to their visit. For those people that cannot visit the museum itself there is a research service offered by the museum called Inreach.

== Origins ==
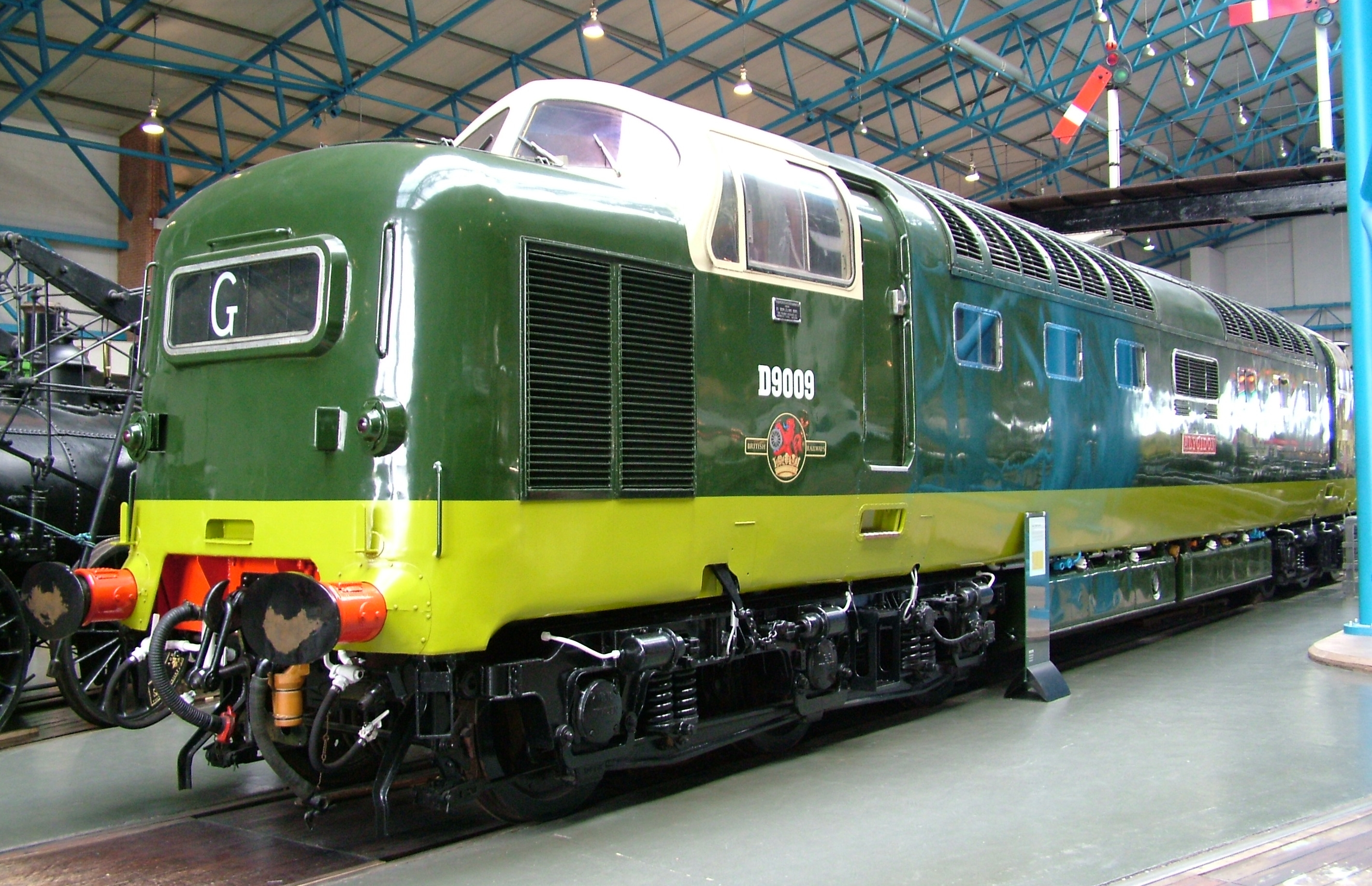
Napier Deltic powered British Rail Class 55 D9009 Alycidon, at the National Railway Museum

Although there had been amateur attempts to establish a national railway museum from the late 19th century, the National Collection today results from the fusion of two long-running official initiatives. One was led by the state museums sector, evidencing pioneering technology, and the other by the railway industry, in which the key contribution came from the North Eastern Railway as successors to the historic Stockton and Darlington Railway.

What became the Science Museum collection was begun in the 1860s by the Patent Office, whose museum included such early relics as Puffing Billy, Stephenson's Rocket and Agenoria (sister locomotive to Stourbridge Lion), which was outhoused to York at an early date.

Preservation of redundant equipment by the railway companies themselves was a matter of chance. Sometimes relics were stored in company workshops and offices and some were destroyed as circumstances changed. Some were put on public display, usually at railway stations, displayed in a glass case or mounted on a plinth. Coppernob at Barrow-in-Furness, Derwent and Locomotion at Darlington and Tiny at Newton Abbot were long-lived examples of this form of display.

The first railway museums were opened at Hamar in Norway (1896) and Nuremberg in Germany (1899). These inspired talk of doing the same in Britain, both in the 1890s and again in 1908, but this came to nothing at that time. Indeed, two of the Great Western Railway's earliest broad-gauge locomotives, North Star and Lord of the Isles, which had been set aside at Swindon Works, were cut up in 1906 for lack of space and several other relics were similarly lost in subsequent years.

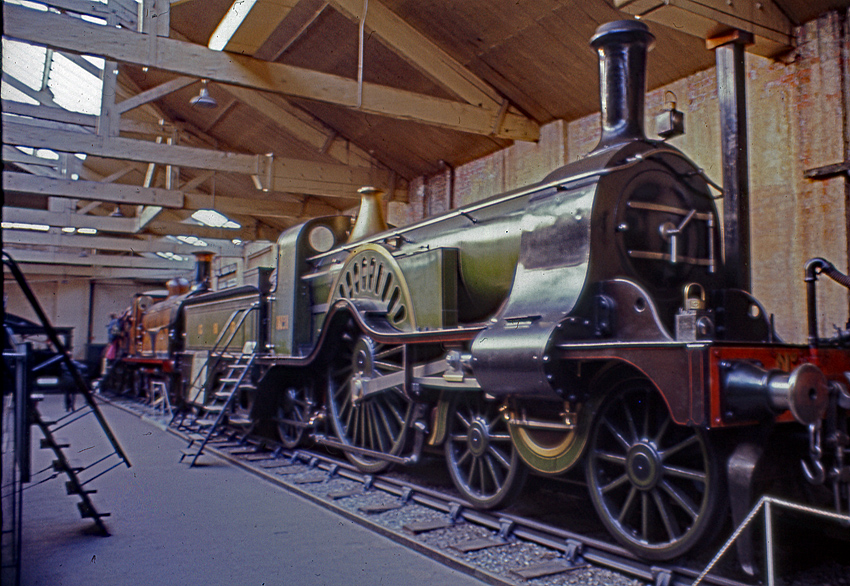
Stirling Single in the old LNER Museum

From 1880, J. B. Harper of the North Eastern had been collecting material much of which was exhibited on the occasion of the S.& D.R. centenary in 1925; and which then formed the basis of a museum opened at York by the London and North Eastern Railway in 1928 under the curatorship of E. M. Bywell.

The smaller exhibits were housed in the old station buildings and the rolling stock and other large exhibits in the former locomotive erecting and repair shops of the old York and North Midland Railway (demolished after the museum closed). Despite this however, the locomotives were displayed on short lengths of track acting as plinths, very much in traditional museum style. It was only when the NRM was formed that Britain acquired a rail-served railway museum where large exhibits could come and go with ease.

The collection was dominated by items from the North Eastern Railway, together with Great Northern Railway items. The other three 'Big Four' railway companies showed little interest in contributing to the LNER's initiative, though eventually one locomotive representative of each did find its way there: the Great Western's City of Truro, London and North Western Railway Columbine and London, Brighton and South Coast Railway B1 Class Gladstone.

The GWR assembled a valuable collection of small objects, mounted privately in a long corridor at Paddington station, and in 1925 it built a replica of North Star. It preserved City of Truro and Tiny in 1931 and purchased Shannon for preservation in 1946.

The LMS had its own collection of small objects at Euston. It also began to build up a collection of historic locomotives, which included Caledonian 123, Columbine, Cornwall, Hardwicke, Highland 103, Midland 118 and Pet. Three others, set aside for preservation at Crewe Works, were scrapped in a change of policy in 1932. The LMS set aside one further locomotive (Midland 158A) before it was overtaken by nationalisation. It also succeeded in preserving a collection of historic royal saloons at Wolverton and built a replica Rocket, with six replica carriages, for the Liverpool & Manchester Railway centenary in 1930, and a replica Grand Junction Railway Travelling Post Office.

The Southern Railway inherited three preserved carriages of the Bodmin and Wadebridge Railway, long displayed at York and at Waterloo station, but otherwise had no policy of preserving redundant equipment. Ryde was preserved from 1934 until cut up in 1940; the only other locomotive preserved by the Southern was Boxhill in 1947. (Gladstone was preserved by the Stephenson Locomotive Society as a private initiative and much later (in 1959) donated to the British Transport Commission.)

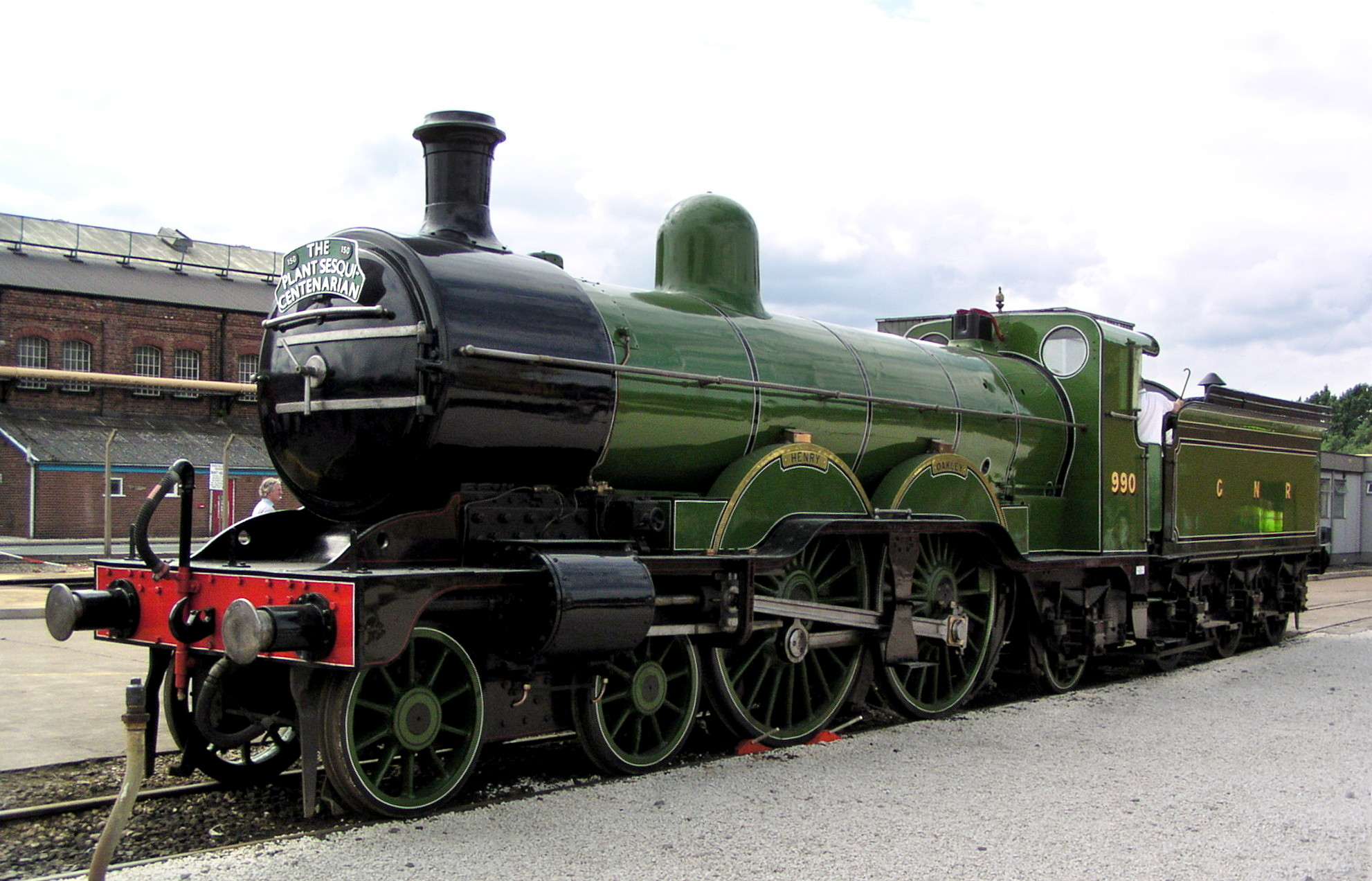
Great Northern Railway Class C1 990 Henry Oakley, first Atlantic in Britain, at its birthplace, Doncaster Works

The nationalisation of British Railways in 1948 gave the opportunity for a more consolidated approach and a report was produced by the British Transport Commission in 1951. Amongst other things this recommended a curator be appointed for the commission's holdings (John M. Scholes), retention of the York museum, creation of other regional museums (not carried out in the way proposed), a small relics display in the old Great Hall at Euston railway station (done on a temporary basis) and a large museum of collections elsewhere in London. For the latter, the former station at Nine Elms was originally favoured as a site, but what was eventually opened in 1961 was the Museum of British Transport in a former bus garage in Clapham.

An official list of locomotives for preservation was compiled, and many were stored in sheds and works throughout the country, others being placed on loan to local authority museums. The 'Steam' Museum at Swindon still displays a large number of items from the National Collection, while the Glasgow Museum of Transport was also indebted to it, although many of the Scottish relics (including NBR K 'Glen' Class 4-4-0 No. 256 Glen Douglas currently at the successor to the Glasgow Museum of Transport, the Riverside Museum, along with the previously mentioned locomotives) no longer form part of the National Collection.

The Beeching Report recommended that British Rail should stop running museums, and a campaign was led by transport historian L. T. C. Rolt and others such as the historian Jack Simmons to create a new museum. Agreement was reached under terms in the Transport Act 1968 for B.R. to provide premises to be occupied by a national museum of railways which would be a branch of the National Museum of Science and Industry then under Dame Margaret Weston and the first English national museum outside London. At the time, the move was criticised in The Guardian on the grounds that there was already a transport museum in York and the new arrangement would leave London without its own. It was also pointed out that the cost-saving argument behind the plans appeared disingenuous whilst the government funded comparable opera institutions by £2 million pounds a year.

The building provided was the former locomotive roundhouse at York North (rebuilt in the 1950s), alongside the East Coast Main Line. The old museum and that at Clapham were closed in 1973. A Sainsbury's supermarket now stands on the Clapham site. Some items were retained in the capital and formed the basis of the London Transport Museum in Covent Garden. Some from York were re-located to the Head of Steam museum in Darlington. Exhibits from the previous museums at York and Clapham moved to the new site were supplemented by vehicles taken from storage at Preston Park in Brighton and elsewhere and restored. Creation of the York museum was largely in the hands of its first keeper, John Coiley, his deputy Peter Semmens, John Van Riemsdijk of the Science Museum and David Jenkinson.

== Growth 1975–2000 ==
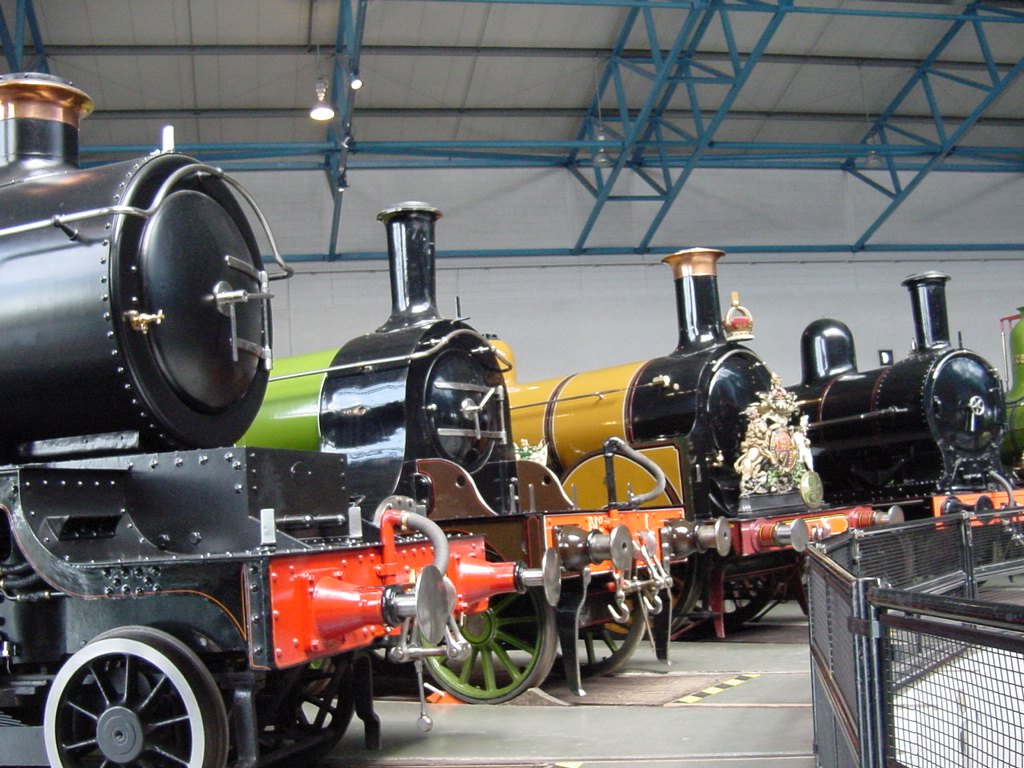
Locomotives arranged around the turntable in the Great Hall

The museum was opened by Prince Philip, Duke of Edinburgh, in 1975. The opening coincided with the 150th anniversary celebrations of the opening of the Stockton & Darlington Railway, for which several working exhibits were provided. By comparison with the museum's predecessors coverage of ordinary passenger coaches and non-steam motive power was enhanced, but a popular new exhibit was ex-Southern Railway Merchant Navy Class No. 35029 Ellerman Lines sectioned to show the workings of a steam locomotive. The new museum received over a million visitors in its first year and was favourably received by critics.

Significant events of 1979 were the restoration of a train of appropriate vehicles to mark the centenary of on-train catering and an exhibition to mark the centenary of railway electric traction which drew attention to the museum's important collections in this area.

Also in 1979 the museum commissioned a working replica of Stephenson's Rocket for the following year's Liverpool and Manchester Railway 150th anniversary. This has since represented the museum at events around the world.

Another working replica was added to the collection for the 150th anniversary of establishment of the Great Western Railway in 1985: that of the 7 ft (2,134 mm) broad gauge locomotive Iron Duke.

In 1990, The Rev. W. Awdry's Railway Series Thomas the Tank Engine books were assured a permanent place in the NRM's collection of historical railway books, due to their role in maintaining children's interests in railways. In 1991, Christopher Awdry chose to fictionalise this event in Thomas and the Great Railway Show, where Thomas (the most iconic of Awdry's characters) was made an honorary member of the NRM collection by Sir Topham Hatt and the Director of the NRM.

Concerns about the condition of the concrete roof structure on the main building brought forward major changes to the museum in 1990. To maintain a presence at York, the former York goods depot across Leeman Road, already in use as a museum store (the Peter Allen Building), was configured to display trains as if in a passenger station, and this together with the adjacent South Yard was marketed as The Great Railway Show. A further selection of exhibits formed the National Railway Museum on Tour on display for a season in the former Swindon Works.

Meanwhile, the main building was completely re-roofed and reconstructed retaining only one of the two original 1954 turntables.

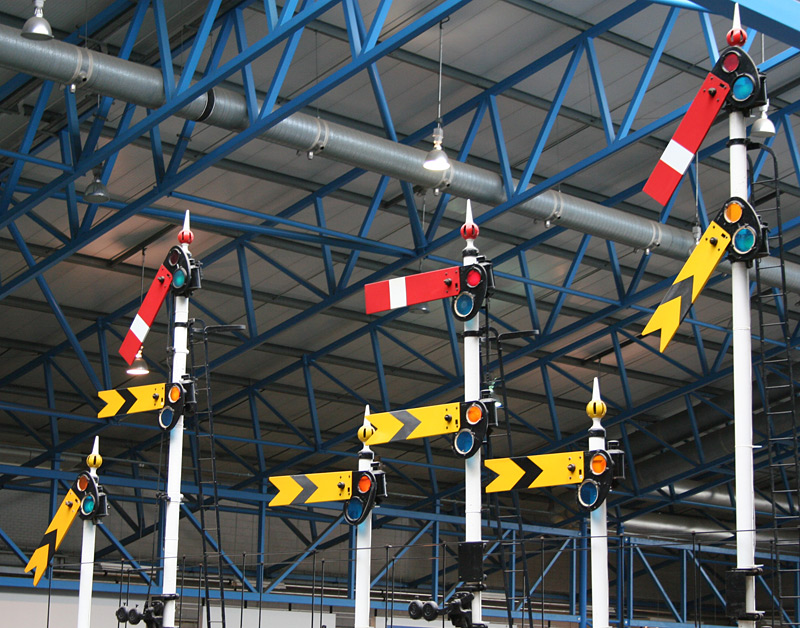
Railway semaphore signals in the Museum's Great Hall

It was reopened on 16 April 1992 by Prince Edward, Duke of Kent as the Great Hall giving enhanced opportunities to display large artifacts such as railway signals, a footbridge from Percy Main station and a segment from the Channel Tunnel. The former goods shed display was retained as the Station Hall.

In 1995 the museum joined forces with the University of York to create an academic research base, the Institute of Railway Studies (and Transport History). It has also since partnered with York College to create the Yorkshire Rail Academy to teach vocational skills. The museum has also provided engineering apprenticeships and participates in partnerships aimed at delivering heritage skills training.

In 1996 the Museum Garden was created incorporating a 7 1/4 in (184 mm) gauge ridable miniature railway. A playground was also added.

Continued concern over the condition of the remaining 1950s buildings on the site led to their replacement by The Works in 1999. This gave several functional areas: the Workshop, for maintenance of rolling stock; the Workshop Gallery, from which the public can look down on this work; a Working Railway Gallery, giving an insight into current and recent operation including a balcony overlooking York railway station hosting a set of monitors showing live feeds from the monitors at York IECC; and the Warehouse which provides an innovative open storage area, which has proved popular with both public and museum professionals.

== Developments in the 21st century ==
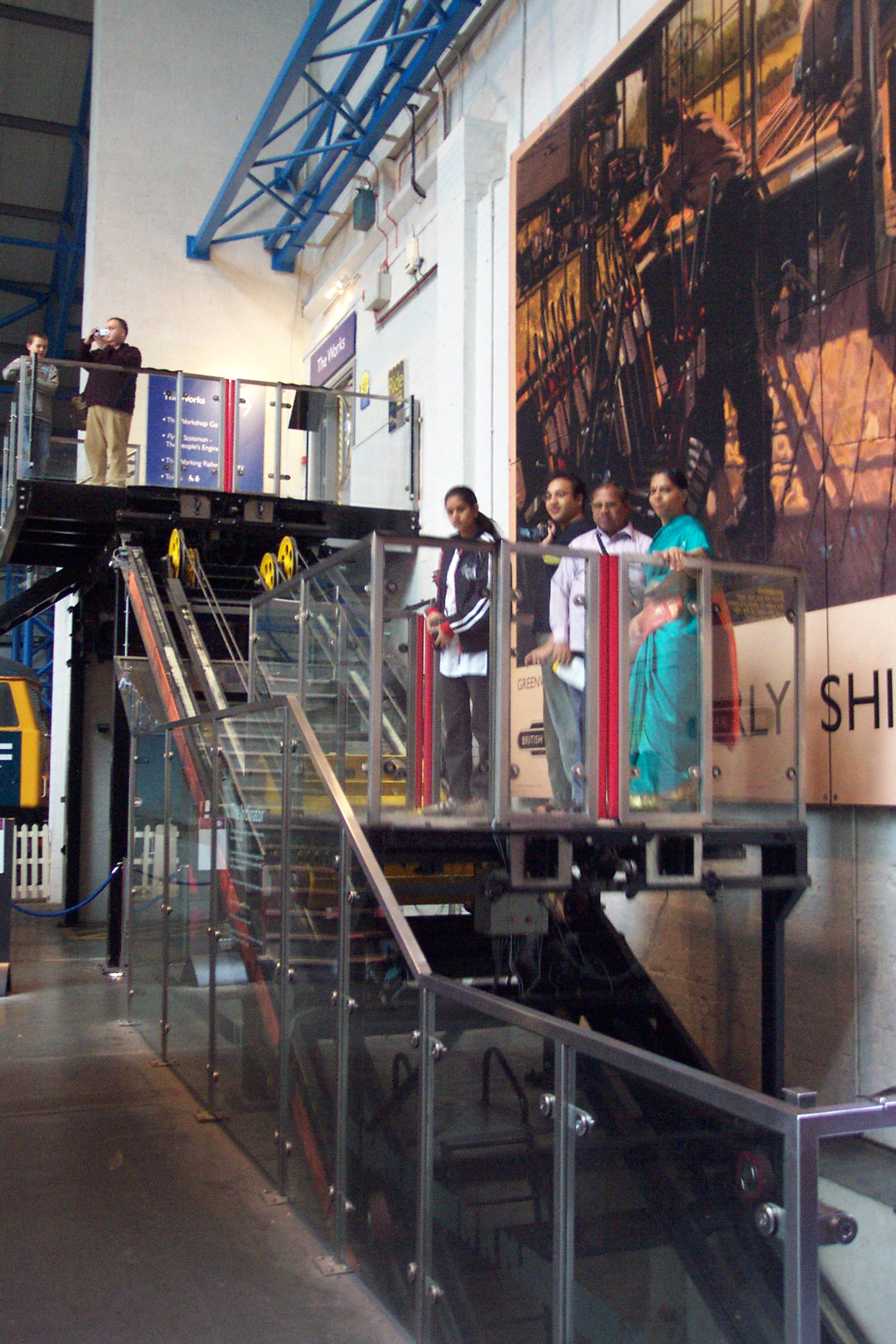
Former inclinator between floors

In order to provide step-free access from the main hall to the Workshop Gallery, the Museum Inclinator was constructed. Besides its primary function, this also served to demonstrate the workings of a funicular railway. To that end its workings were exposed in the style of a larger open air funicular railway, rather than being concealed in the fabric of the building as is more normal for intramural lifts. It ceased working due to lack of spare parts, and with no plans for repair it was removed by August 2013.

2004 saw several major developments at the museum. Several railway anniversaries were celebrated by a major "Railfest".

Another took place from 25 to 30 May 2008 with a Sixties theme. The Locomotion museum was opened at Shildon, County Durham providing undercover collection care facilities for more rail vehicles (particularly freight wagons) from the museum's collection. In addition, the museum had a high-profile campaign, supported by the National Heritage Memorial Fund, to purchase Flying Scotsman which arrived at the Museum as the climax of Railfest.

The first stage of a new centre providing easy access to the museum's Library and Archives, called "Search Engine", opened at the end of 2007.

From 18 July to 23 August 2008, a popular new venture was the staging by York Theatre Royal at the Museum of the play of E. Nesbit's The Railway Children, awarded five stars in The Guardian. Following this success, it was repeated in 2009, from 23 July to 3 September, and the museum provided locomotives for subsequent performances at Waterloo International station and in Toronto.

Major plans under the name "NRM+" were made for refurbishing the Great Hall display, for which a preliminary Heritage Lottery Fund contribution was announced in 2009, and seeking potential partners for a further outhousing project.

There are other partnerships for development of the museum estate and the land around it (much owned by Network Rail) as "York Central" but the economic situation during 2009 put these particular plans in abeyance although a similar York Central project was launched by the city council at the beginning of 2016. The NRM+ project was cancelled in April 2011 due to lack of success in assembling the funding package. However, major changes to the displays in the Station Hall began later in 2011.

In 2012, the NRM decided to repatriate temporarily the two LNER A4 class steam locomotives, numbers 60008 Dwight D Eisenhower and 60010 Dominion of Canada from their respective North American homes at the National Railroad Museum in Green Bay, Wisconsin and Exporail in Montreal, as part of the 'Mallard 75' event in 2013. The two locomotives would be on loan for up to two years, during which time the locomotives would be cosmetically restored, 60008 in BR Brunswick Green (as it appeared in 1963 on withdrawal) and 60010 as LNER 4489 in Garter Blue with its original Canadian Pacific Railway bell (as it appeared in 1939).

Since 2019, the NRM has been hosting George Stephenson's original Rocket (1829)

The same year, the NRM created an iPhone App in association with East Coast that allowed people travelling between London and Edinburgh on the East Coast Main Line through York to view objects from the collection in connection with locations on the route. It has since been removed from the App Store, and the page removed from the official NRM website.

On 8 December 2012 it was announced that an annex to the National Railway Museum would be built close to Leicester North station on the Great Central Railway. The project ultimately did not proceed due to funding issues.

=== Funding crisis point ===
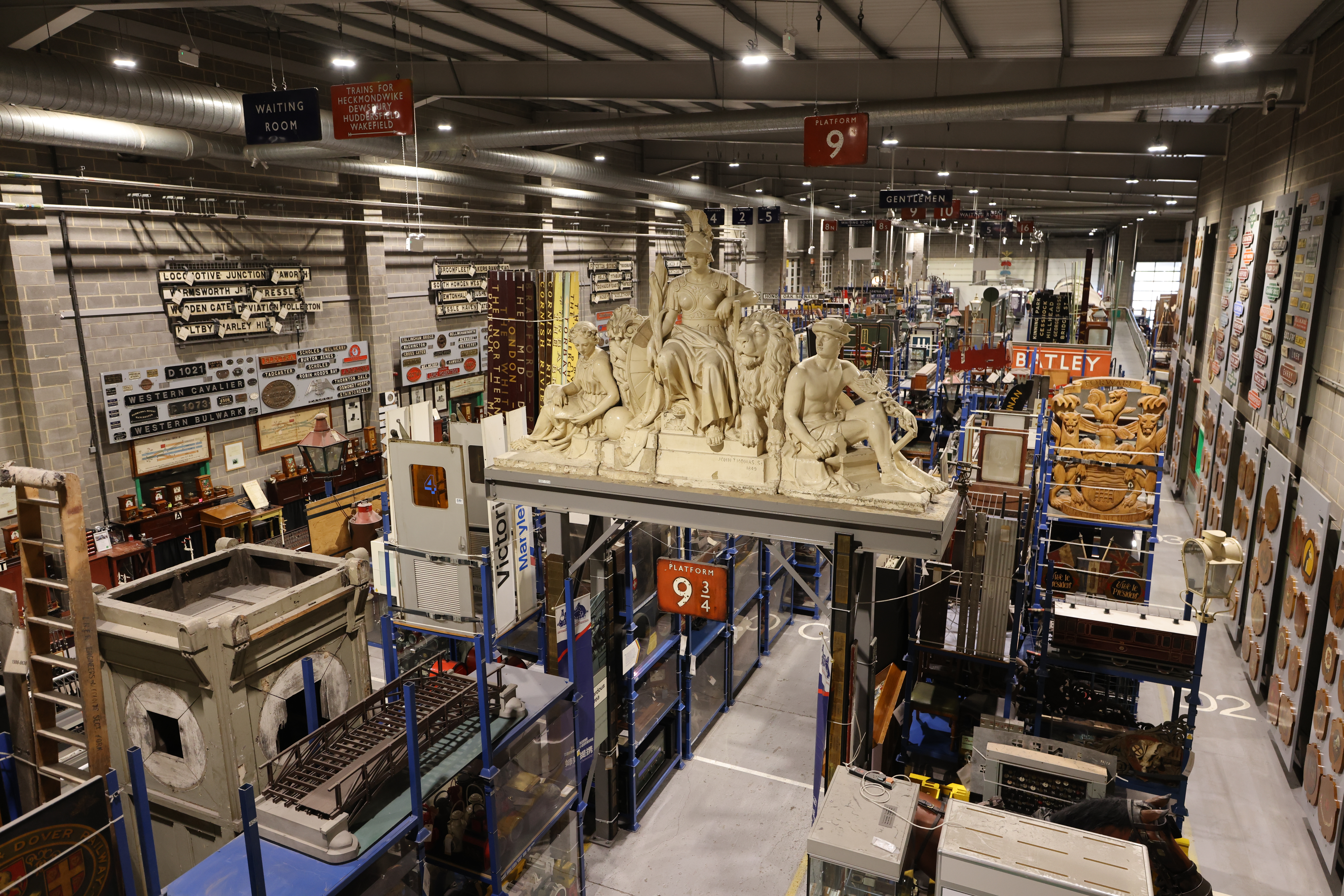
The Warehouse Gallery

In June 2013, the York Press reported that NRM was facing a funding crisis due to a potential 10% annual cut to the Science Museum Group's funding, an estimated real-terms 25% cut following lay-offs and disbandment of projects. The museum was considering scaling down its functions, re-introducing admissions charges or facing complete closure. However, following a campaign by local residents the Chancellor George Osborne announced a 5% cut in the museum's budget. This prompted Science Museum Group director Ian Blatchford to announce two weeks later that the museum had been doubly saved — he added that had the 10% cut taken place the Group would have chosen to close the National Media Museum in Bradford.

== Policies ==
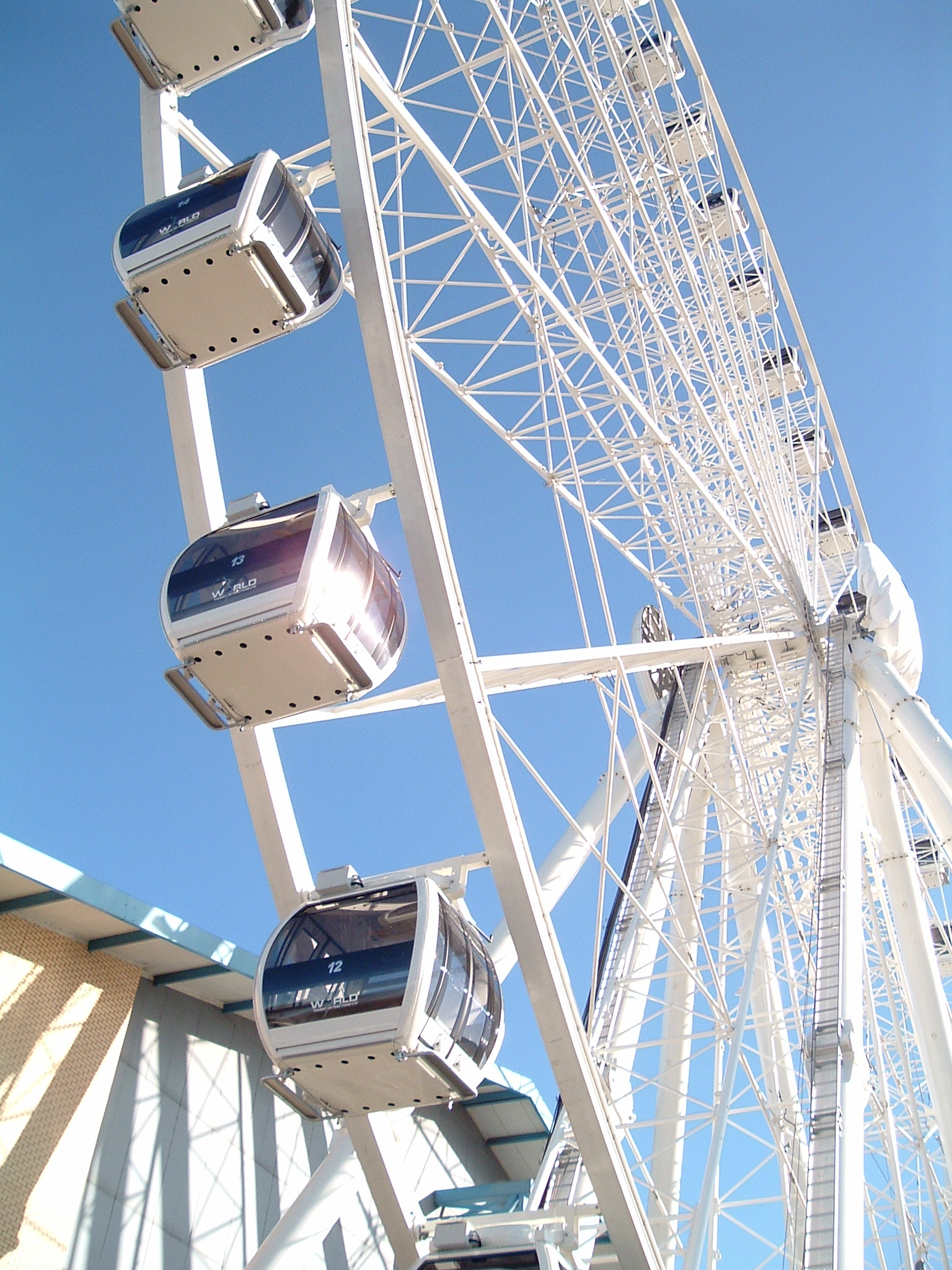
The Yorkshire Wheel, sited from 2006 to 2008 at the NRM, was one of the museum's fund raising initiatives

Criticisms of the museum which have been raised include claims that it has devoted insufficient attention to modern traction; that it was neglecting scholarship in favour of commercialism; or that its photographic collections constitute a "black hole". The museum's response is that these criticisms do not always take into account the financial constraints under which the museum operates: its Grant in Aid from the Department for Culture, Media and Sport amounts to £6.50 per visitor which delivers less overall income than for comparable London museums. For some of its funding the museum depends on money-making events such as the Yorkshire Wheel, which operated at the museum from 2006 to 2008 and visits from Thomas the Tank Engine as chronicled in Thomas and the Great Railway Show. The museum has also suffered a few thefts of objects.

The museum can be allocated material from the railway industry by the Railway Heritage Committee. Because of the diversity of material falling potentially within the museum's collection policy and the problems of caring for it, decisions on acquisition of new items for the collection can be difficult. Previously the museum has treated rolling stock as if it were effectively still in railway service and capable of undergoing repeated heavy repairs and restoration. Since being preserved many of the museum's locomotives have operated on the main line, heritage railways or at the museum. More recently, there have been moves to less interventionist forms of conservation in some cases leading to some exhibits becoming non-operational.

The Museum's management of the protracted overhaul of LNER Class A3 4472 Flying Scotsman was heavily criticised in an internally commissioned report in 2012.

Since 1977, the Friends of the National Railway Museum have been in existence as a group to give financial and other support to the museum, such as financing the original restoration to steam of Duchess of Hamilton.

The 1990 "Great Railway Show" won the Museum of the Year award and in 2001 the museum gained the European Museum of the Year Award. It has also won White Rose awards from the Yorkshire Tourist Board, and in recognition of the several major developments in 2004 was given the Heritage Railway Association's Peter Manisty Award.

== Online presence ==
The National Railway Museum website offers a facility for visitors to plan their visit to the museum in advance. The museum also has a policy of improving access to its collections via its website. It has uploaded some of the recordings from the National Archive of Railway History to its website. The museum's archives and library service Search Engine is increasingly making its collection accessible online by providing catalogues and lists for researchers to search before visiting and adding low resolution copies of its drawing online. The library collection can be searched through the University of York library catalogue. All of the museum's rolling stock and a large amount of other material has also been added to the website.

The National Railway Museum also has a presence on a number of other websites. Copies of many of its posters, photographs and artworks can be ordered through the Science and Society Picture Library. The National Railway Museum has a presence on the National Preservation forums. Members and Readers are able to talk and comment directly to members of the staff. Providing both feedback and constructive criticism, a valuable source of information for the museum. Members of staff can usually answer questions when they are not busy and are part of the National Railway Museum group. National Railway Museum staff also publish a blog via WordPress.com where staff write stories about events behind the scenes in the museum such as conservation work or preparation for major events.

== Locomotives ==
These are a few of the Museum's locomotives (listed by operational state, and then by date the design was introduced).

Operational steam locomotives

- LNER Class A3 4-6-2 60103 Flying Scotsman. Overhaul started in 2006 by the NRM. After an external review the restoration was taken over by Riley and Son and completed in 2016. Withdrawn from traffic in early 2022, it was overhauled and brought back into steam in time for its 100th birthday in 2023.

Steam locomotives under overhaul/stored

- SR Lord Nelson Class 4-6-0 No. 850 Lord Nelson. As of 2026 it is stored at the Watercress Line. Boiler certification expired in 2016.
- SR N15 Class 4-6-0 No. 30777 Sir Lamiel. Currently undergoing overhaul at the Great Central Railway. Withdrawn from service in 2017 after boiler ticket expired and undergoing mainline standard overhaul.
- Great Central Railway O4 Class 2-8-0 No. 63601. Currently on the Great Central Railway. Withdrawn in 2012 for overhaul.
- British Railways Standard Class 7 "Britannia" 4-6-2 70013 Oliver Cromwell. Overhauled at the Great Central Railway (Loughborough) between 2004 and 2008. Boiler certificate expired in December 2018. Currently based at Loughborough undergoing mainline standard overhaul.

Steam locomotives on static display

- Stephenson's 0-2-2 Rocket. Two replicas are also in the York collection, one built for operation (rebuilt 2019) and one sectioned. The original was with the parent body, the Science Museum in London, until 2018.
- NER No. 66 Aerolite. On static display in York since 1934. Moved to Locomotion in 2023 and on display in New Hall since 2024.
- GWR 4000 Class 4-6-0 4003 Lode Star. Returned to the NRM in November 2015 from the Museum of the Great Western Railway, Swindon as part of an exchange of locomotives in preparation for Swindon 175 in 2016.
- LMS Stanier Class 5 4-6-0 5000. Currently at Locomotion on static display.
- LNWR Class G2 ("Super D") 0-8-0 No. 49395. Currently at Locomotion on static display.
- LNER Class A4 4-6-2 4468 Mallard. Restored to steam for a time from 1986; now on static display. Unlikely to run again due to exhibit popularity, the internals of the locomotive being in considerable disrepair, and the fact that two other A4s in the UK are in working order or awaiting overhaul.
- SR Class Q1 0-6-0 No. C1. On static display.
- BR Standard Class 9F 2-10-0 92220 Evening Star, the last steam locomotive built for British Railways. On static display and not expected to return to working order due to class being barred from running on the national network. Returned to York in 2010 after a two-year loan to the Museum of the Great Western Railway, Swindon.
- LMS Princess Coronation Class 4-6-2 6229 Duchess of Hamilton. Returned to the NRM in 2009 after being re-streamlined, it was at first displayed in an exhibit, Streamlined: Styling an era.
- SR Schools class 4-4-0 No. 925 Cheltenham. Worked on the Mid Hants Railway until boiler certification expired in 2022. Returned to York in 2023.

Steam locomotives located away from York

- GWR 3700 Class 4-4-0 3440 City of Truro. Loaned to the Museum of the Great Western Railway in November 2015 as part of an exchange of locomotives in preparation for Swindon 175 in 2016.
- GWR 6000 Class 4-6-0 6000 King George V. Loaned to the Museum of the Great Western Railway in November 2015 as part of an exchange of locomotives in preparation for Swindon 175 in 2016.
- LNER Class V2 2-6-2 4771 Green Arrow. After many years of being a popular operation engine, her boiler certificate was due to expire Spring 2008, but failed beforehand on the North Yorkshire Moors Railway. In need of extensive repairs to her one-piece three cylinder block, consideration being made to potential future overhaul. Currently at Doncaster Museum and Art Gallery.

== Heads of museum ==
Head	Served
John A. Coiley	1974–1992
Andrew Dow	1992–1994
Andrew J. Scott	1994–2010
Steve Davies	2010–2012
Paul Kirkman, civil servant with the Department for Culture, Media and Sport	2012–2017
Judith McNicol	2017–

== See also ==
- List of British railway museums
- List of railway museums worldwide
- Kyoto Railway Museum
