= Light Steam Power =

British magazine

Cover of July–September 1975 issue

Light Steam Power was a magazine dedicated to amateur and small-scale interest in steam power. Its masthead for some years described itself as, "Authentic World News on Steam Power for Cars, Launches and Small Stationary Units".

== Publishing history ==
The magazine was self-published by its editor John Ness Walton of Kirk Michael, Isle of Man. It began when he took over an earlier magazine, Steam Car Developments and Steam Marine Motors in 1945, renaming this in 1949. For most of its existence it was published bi-monthly, although the first and last volumes were published at three- and four-month intervals. In its last years, from 1977 it changed its name to Steam Power and re-located to Loughborough. The magazine continued under this name until 1981.

In more recent years, there was a website maintaining the magazine's archives, but this has now gone. In 2009 an agreement was made with the National Steam Car Association for them to hold the rights to Light Steam Power and other Walton publications. Mr. Walton died March 19, 2013, aged 91.

== Coverage ==
The two main applications of steam power covered were steam cars and small steam launches. Much of the magazine's content was influenced, if not indeed written, by skilled and enthusiastic amateurs describing their own projects and so their choice of these projects influenced the magazine's own direction. Steam turbines and large steamships were less frequent, being beyond the constructional capacity of most readers, but they were described as news items when particularly interesting events took place. One aspect that oddly was only lightly covered was the use of steam on railways, unusually so as the magazine's heyday coincided with the demise of mainline steam but with increasing interest in the railway and steam preservation movements.

The magazine covered a broad range of topics within 'steam power', often at a far more advanced level than contemporary railway and steam locomotive practice. Low-water-content water-tube boilers were commonplace and even monotube steam generators and uniflow engines were regular features. Although the terms were not yet in use, these technical features coincided with increased recognition of the Advanced Steam Technology and Modern Steam movement.

Coverage was always worldwide and international, even though this was unusual for any magazine at this time, let alone a small independent. Many articles were provided by Australian and Canadian builders.

== Other content ==
As well as the magazine content, it also included advertisements for other services from J.N. Walton such as engineering drawings for a range of related machinery, also castings for its construction. Walton also supplied the 'KleenHeet' waste oil burner.

== Similar publications ==
From 1965 a US publication, Steam Calliope: A Voice for the Steam Automobile was published in Panorama City, California by mechanical engineer Thomas P. Hall. It originated news and published clippings for western members of the Steam Automobile Club of America.

The Steam Automobile was the quarterly publication of the Steam Automobile Club of America and was published from 1959 to 1986. Steam Power was the quarterly of the Steam Power Club, a spinoff of the SACA in California. Its last issues were named Ssssteam.

The Steam Automobile Bulletin began in 1986 following a shift of editorial material to a commercial magazine. It continues as a bimonthly with anything technical and historic on steam between toys and locomotives, including steam cars.

== See also ==
- Edward Pritchard, Australian engineer of light steam power
