= President Perón =

President Perón or Presidente Perón may refer to:

- Juan Perón, president of Argentina from 1946 to 1955 and 1973 to 1974

- Argentina (locomotive), a steam locomotive originally named Presidente Perón

- Isabel Perón, president of Argentina from 1974 to 1976
- Presidente Perón Partido, a partido located in Argentina
- Presidente Perón International Airport, an airport in Argentina
