= Steam Automobile Club of America =

The Steam Automobile Club of America (SACA) is a non-profit organization dedicated to the development, accumulation and dissemination of knowledge about small steam power systems.

Logo of the club

== History ==
The club was founded in 1957 to promote the restoration and safe use of steam-powered automobiles. Since that time its mandate has grown to become a source of information on modern light steam power, including historic automobiles, new steam autos and small steam plants for alternative energy applications.

== Dissemination of steam information ==
=== Online tutorial ===
An introduction to steam power technology, with emphasis on small systems, is online.

=== Periodicals ===
- The Steam Automobile, quarterly from 1959 to 1986.
- The Steam Automobile Bulletin, bi-monthly from 1986 to present.

==== Similar publications ====
- Light Steam Power was published by John Walton of the Isle of Man from 1945 to 1977 covering steam power for automobiles and boats.
- The Steam Car Magazine is published by the Steam Car Club of Great Britain with a focus on historic automobiles.

=== Annual meeting ===
In addition to regional meetings in the United States, an annual meeting is held each September at the Kimmel Collection in Michigan. The meeting has a technical conference format mixed with demonstrations of steam systems and performance trials of steam cars.

=== Technical reports and plans ===
The club publishes technical reports and steam system designs and plans created by club members over the years. In addition, reprints of engineering reports of small steam power projects and relevant thermodynamic analysis are also available.

=== Online forum ===
A forum for technical discussions on steam power is searchable back to the year 2000.
