= 5AT Advanced Technology Steam Locomotive =

New-technology steam locomotive project, 2001-2012

5AT
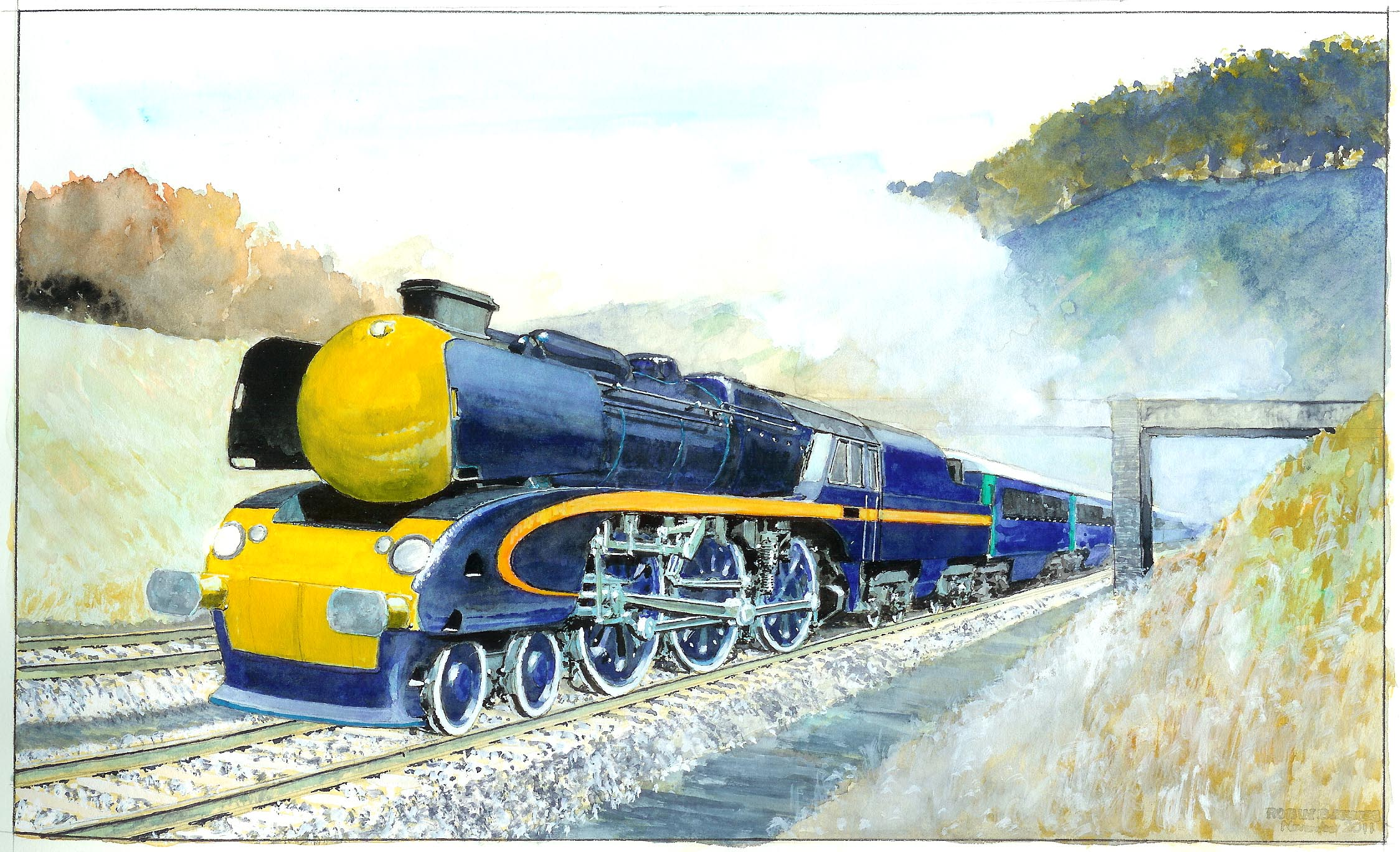
- The 5AT locomotive illustrated in its final form.
Type and origin
- Power type: Steam
- Designer: David Wardale
Specifications
- Configuration
  - Whyte: 4-6-0
- Gauge: 4 ft 8 1/2 in (1,435 mm)
- Leading dia.: 3 ft 0 in (0.914 m)
- Driver dia.: 6 ft 2 in (1.880 m)
- Axle load: 20 tonne
- Adhesive weight: 60 tonne
- Loco weight: 80 long tons 0 cwt (179,200 lb or 81.3 t)
- Total weight: 160 long tons 0 cwt (358,400 lb or 162.6 t)
- Fuel type: Light Oil or Coal
- Fuel capacity: 7 long tons 0 cwt (15,700 lb or 7.1 t)
- Water cap.: 10,000 imperial gallons (45,000 L; 12,000 US gal)
- Boiler pressure: 305 psi (2.10 MPa)
- Cylinders: Two
- Cylinder size: 17.72 in × 31.5 in (450 mm × 800 mm)
- Loco brake: Air
- Train brakes: Air
Performance figures
- Maximum speed: 113 mph (Max Design Speed 125 mph)
- Tractive effort: 32,688 lbf (145.40 kN)
- Factor of adh.: 4 approx

The 5AT Advanced Technology steam locomotive was a conceptual design conceived by the British engineer David Wardale, and first described in his 1998 definitive work on modern steam, The Red Devil and Other Tales from the Age of Steam.

Wardale's purpose in putting forward the "Super Class 5 4-6-0" design concept (as he then called it) was to offer a future for steam hauled trains on the main lines in the UK on which the use of heritage traction is likely to be gradually phased out as the speed and density of commercial rail traffic increase.

Work on the project was suspended in March 2012 following completion of a project Feasibility Study and subsequent failure to raise the finance needed to complete the detail design and construction of the locomotive.

== Proposal ==
Wardale's proposal was for a locomotive that would:

- be acceptable to the British railway authorities by conforming with the size and weight of the BR 5MT Class 4-6-0 locomotives that have operated on British main lines since 1951;
- offer a level of performance needed to integrate steam-hauled charter trains into the modern high-speed rail-system without causing bottle-necks;
- offer much greater reliability and much lower operating costs than heritage steam locomotives.

The April 1998 edition of Steam Railway contained an article by Wardale titled "Whither Steam Now?" which included reference to a "locomotive of Class 5 4-6-0 format - calling it a 5GT - that would outperform any British Pacific."

Still described as the 5GT in the February 2001 edition of The Railway Magazine, the name 5AT first emerged in a letter from Alan Fozard to the editor of Steam Railway in June 2001, which coincided with the formation of the 5AT Project.

The 5AT in its final conceptual form remained almost identical in size and weight to the BR 5MT, sharing the axle spacings and being just 4 tonnes heavier, with axle loads of 20 tonnes on each driving axle and 10 tonnes on each bogie axle. Where it differed in size from the 5MT was in its tender which was massively enlarged to carry large quantities of fuel and water to extend its operating range. Such a large tender would also have provided space for the locomotive-carried parts of advanced signalling systems such as European Rail Traffic Management System. The 5AT's four-axle tender would have had a gross weight of 80 tonnes with a fuel (light-oil) capacity of 7 tonnes and water capacity of 46 tonnes (10,000 imperial gallons).

== Outline drawing ==
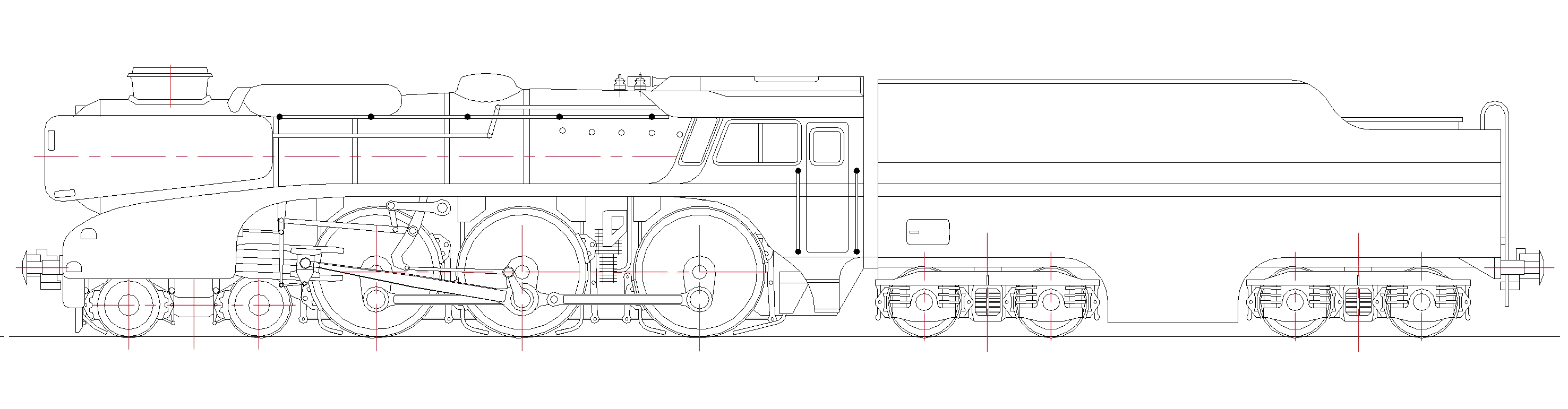
5AT Locomotive Outline

== The 5AT Project ==
The 5AT Project was established in 2001 with the aim of commercializing Wardale's 5AT locomotive concept and bringing it to reality. The project was spearheaded by a small team of professional engineers, scientists and businessmen whose common purpose was to see steam traction continue in main-line operation into the foreseeable future.

=== Design calculations ===
The first task undertaken by the project team was to commission David Wardale to undertake the Fundamental Design Calculations for the locomotive. The purpose of these calculations was to verify through detailed calculations that the conceptual design was viable in engineering terms and that it would meet the performance predictions that Wardale had made for it (see below). At the same time, a project website was established.

Wardale completed the Fundamental Design Calculations for the locomotive in late 2004 after 2½ years of almost continuous labour. The work comprises 6100 lines of calculation divided into 26 sections as follows:

- Section 1.1 - General Calculations - Determination of the Target Power & Tractive Effort-Speed Characteristics
- Section 1.2 - General Calculations - Determination of the Target Load-Speed-Gradient Curves
- Section 1.3 - General Calculations - Preliminary Basic Calculations
- Section 1.4 - General Calculations - Tractive Effort Diagrams
- Section 2.1 - Pistons, Rings Rods and Tail Rods;
- Section 2.2 - Crosshead and Slidebars;
- Section 2.3 - Connecting Rods;
- Section 3 - Crankpins, coupling rods, driving & coupled axles, and crankpin & axle roller bearings;
- Section 4 - Piston valves, valve rings, valve spindles and packings;
- Section 5 - Valve gear;
- Section 6 - Cylinders and cylinder liners;
- Section 7 - Valve liner cooling steam calculations;
- Section 8 - Wheel balancing;
- Section 9 - Feed water heating;
- Section 10 - Combustion air heating;
- Section 11.1 - Boiler Strength;
- Section 11.2 - Boiler Combustion System;
- Section 11.3 - Combustion Gas + Steam Flow and Heat Transfer;
- Section 12 - Exhaust system;
- Section 13 - Spring rigging;
- Section 14 - Main Frame;
- Section 15 - Brakes;
- Section 16 - Leading bogie + engine stability;
- Section 17 - Specification of proprietary equipment;
- Section 18 - Performance predictions (verification of Section 1 incorporating the outputs of other calculations).
- Section 1.3F - General Calculations - Preliminary Basic Calculations (final version)

=== Business plan ===
Since the completion of the Fundamental Design Calculations, the 5AT Project team focussed on the development of a business plan to attract investment in the project. This proved to be a difficult task because of the high development costs that were anticipated for designing and gaining railway approvals for a prototype locomotive, and the limited returns that might be expected from the locomotive's use on tourist and "cruise" trains. It was concluded that the cost of building the locomotive could only be justified if its initial development costs were "written off".

=== Research ===
The project team also undertook extensive research into the possibilities of developing alternative designs based around the high efficiency and low maintenance concepts of the 5AT. Particular focus was placed on the possibilities for (coal-fired) steam traction for coal transportation in developing countries such as Indonesia, for which the operating costs were estimated to have been substantially lower than for diesel and electric traction.

== 5AT Locomotive Performance ==
=== Predictions ===
The performance predicted for the 5AT locomotive are summarized as follows:

- Max continuous operating speed 180 km/h/113 mph (with a maximum design speed 200 km/h/125 mph);
- Max draw-bar power of 1,890 kW/2,535 hp at 113 km/h/70 mph;
- Power-to-weight ratio of 12 kW per tonne (at the draw bar);
- Max draw-bar thermal efficiency 11.8% (14% indicated efficiency);
- Operating range between fuel fills 925 km (575 mi) and between water fills 610 km (380 mi) under "average conditions";
- Operating range between fuel fills 552 km (343 mi) and between water fills 367 km (228 mi) at a maximum operating speed and power.

=== Technical advances ===
The above performance predictions were predicated on several technical advances, mostly developed by Ing. L.D. Porta, all of which have been proven in practice, in most cases on Wardale's SAR Class 26 "The Red Devil" and described in Wardale's book on the subject. These advances are summarized as follows:

- High boiler pressure: 2,100 kPa (305 psi);
- High superheat temperature: 450 °C;
- Lempor exhaust system to minimize cylinder back-pressure;
- Feedwater pre-heating;
- Combustion air pre-heating;
- Large streamlined steam pipes, passages and steam chests;
- Large valves and valve ports to facilitate free steam-flow in and out of cylinders;
- Long piston stroke to minimize piston mass and steam leakage;
- Pistons and valves fitted with diesel-quality rings to reduce steam leakage;
- Tight tolerances throughout (equivalent to modern diesel standards);
- Super-high quality insulation, permanently secured in place, to minimize heat losses;
- Air sanding system and enhanced-adhesion wheel-rim profiles to control wheel slip;
- Clasp brakes on all wheels to improve braking performance to reduce stopping distances;
- Ultra light-weight motion (rods, pistons and piston valves) to minimize inertia forces and thus balancing requirements (and thus hammer blow on the track).

=== Design features ===
In addition, the locomotive would have incorporated the following features that would have minimized its maintenance requirements and increased its reliability:

- Improved component design using CAD/CAM to ensure tight tolerances and exact fit-up;
- Finite Element stress analysis of all critical components to accurately determine stress levels in critical components;
- Better materials – including bearings, lubricants, wear components, insulation etc.;
- Replacement of bolts and rivets wherever possible with welded connections, eliminating the possibility of components becoming loose.
- Simple two-cylinder design to minimize number of moving components.
- No inaccessible components.
- The use of AAR rules where appropriate, American Association of Railroads rules being generally the most robust design rules where empirical methods have to be used.
- Roller bearings on all axles, crankpins, motion and valve gear, giving near-zero wear and minimal vibration;
- Self-adjusting wedges on all driving and coupled axleboxes to eliminate axlebox-frame gaps, to prevent pounding and vibration associated with axlebox wear;
- Robust horn stays to minimize risks of frame cracking at top-corners of horns;
- Improved valve and cylinder tribology to minimize wear of rings and liners;
- Tail rods on pistons to reduce piston ring and cylinder wear;
- All-welded boiler – eliminates problems caused by riveted seams and screwed stays. No possibility of leakage or caustic embrittlement;
- Effective boiler water treatment that practically eliminates boiler maintenance.
- Superior firebox stay design to minimize incidence of fractured stays;
- Rigid engine-tender drawgear to eliminate ‘stamping’ and vibrations;
- ‘Drop-type’ firebox fusible plugs - safer than the usual lead-filled plugs;
- Corrosion-resistant steel for tender and smokebox;
- Improved boiler/frame connections to increase rigidity and reduce frame flexing;
- Clasp brakes to minimize axle and axle bearing loads due to braking forces;
- Centralized lubricant dispensing system for automatic lubrication of all sliding surfaces etc.;
- Valve liners cooled with saturated steam to protect lubricants from extreme temperatures associated with high-superheated steam.

== Project suspension ==
In March 2012, after eleven years of development, the decision was made to suspend the project due to lack of financial support. In the project Feasibility Study, it was estimated that the funding required to complete the detail design, manufacture, assembly, testing and main-line approvals for a prototype locomotive was slightly over £10 million at 2010 prices. However subsequent "production" locomotives were estimated to cost in the order of £2.5 million, a cost that could have been justified by the anticipated returns from the haulage of luxury high-speed cruise and tour trains for which the concept was targeted. Following suspension of the project the design group re-formed as the Advanced Steam Traction Trust to provide engineering resources for alternative projects either in the form of new designs or in improvements to existing designs.

== See also ==
- Advanced steam technology
- Andre Chapelon
- Livio Dante Porta
- Steam locomotives of the 21st century
- ACE 3000
