= Livio Dante Porta =

Argentine steam locomotive designer

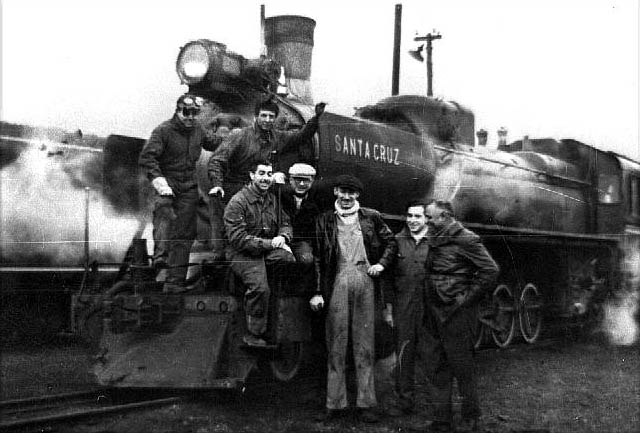
Porta (centre, with dark cap and scarf) and engine crew in 1959

Livio Dante Porta (21 March 1922 – 10 June 2003) was an Argentine steam locomotive engineer. He is particularly remembered for his innovative modifications to existing locomotive systems in order to obtain better performance and energy efficiency, and reduced pollution. He developed the Kylpor and Lempor exhaust systems. The Lemprex ejector was under development at the time of his death.

== Early years ==
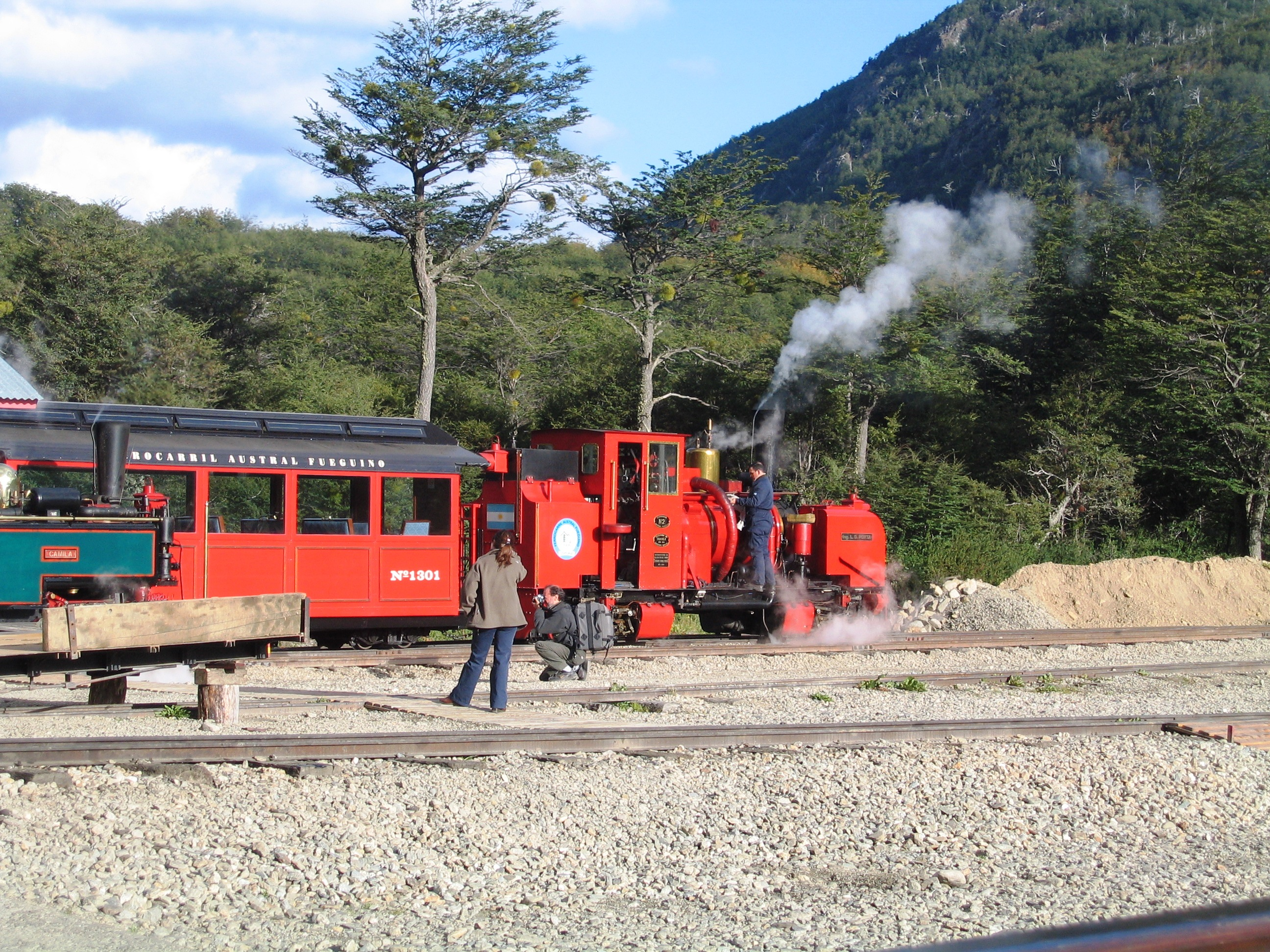
Ing.L.D.Porta, the FCAF 500 mm (19 3/4 in) gauge Garratt named in his honour

Porta was born in Paraná, Entre Ríos, and studied civil engineering, concluding his studies in 1946, at a time when steam was already giving way to diesel and electric locomotives in Europe and North America.

== Career ==
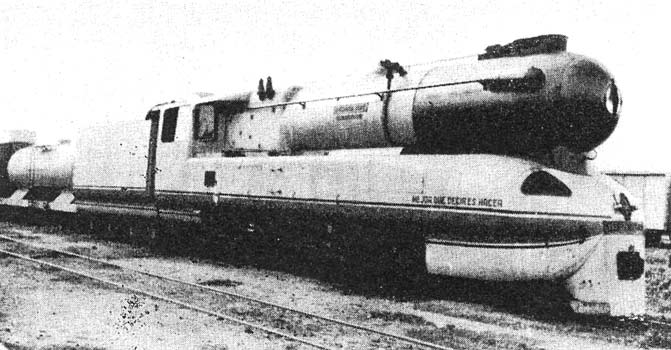
Argentina, Porta's first locomotive

Naturally, Porta's first projects were in Argentina. Taking the work of Andre Chapelon in France as his starting point, he set out to demonstrate that the steam locomotive was far from reaching its maximum potential.

His first locomotive project in 1948 was a conversion of a 1,000 mm (3 ft 3 3/8 in) metre gauge 4-6-2 built in 1906. The final design was a 4-cylinder compound 4-8-0 named Argentina.

Porta moved to Patagonia in 1957 as general manager of the Red de Ferrocarril Industrial de Rio Turbio coal railway (Ramal Ferro Industrial Río Turbio) in Santa Cruz - see also Rio Turbio Railway; his work allowed the steam locomotive fleet to remain in service for another 40 years. In 1960, he returned to Buenos Aires to become head of thermodynamics at the National Institute of Industrial Technology (INTI). His writings on steam technology are voluminous, and whilst most of his papers remain unpublished, some 26 of them have been transcribed and published by the Advanced Steam Traction Trust.

In early 1983, Porta and his family moved to the United States of America to work on steam locomotive development for the American Coal Enterprises project. This was the only time in his life he lived outside of Argentina for any great length of time. Porta was among the co-inventors listed for the project's patent which was filed in 1980 and issued in 1984. After the collapse of this project he returned to Argentina in 1986, with further work being undertaken in that country as well as in Brazil and Paraguay. In 1992, Porta was contracted by the Cuban government to implement an extensive project on rational use of energy, which included modern steam railway traction as well as general industrial steam modernisation of power stations and sugar mill plants. His final steam project was the development of a steam bus in the capital of Buenos Aires along with Gustavo Durán; Porta had already designed a modern steam car whilst at INTI during 1970.

== Porta's influence ==
Porta continued advancing steam technology right up to the time of his death: from the mid-1990s he worked for the Cuban Sugar Ministry (Minaz) on locomotives using new fuels such as bagasse; he also considerably influenced many later steam projects worldwide, notably those of David Wardale and the 5AT Project, Phil Girdlestone, Roger Waller, Shaun McMahon, and Nigel Day.

In 2001, he supported Shaun McMahon's heavy rebuilding and modification of a 500 mm (19 3/4 in) gauge Garratt locomotive for the Southern Fuegian Railway that had been produced in Argentina in 1994. McMahon included larger cross section for tubing, insulation of the boiler and improved front end as well as combustion system in line with Porta's teachings over the years; the economy of this modern steam engine was improved vastly, more than doubling train length. As a tribute to Porta's lifetime work and in celebration of his upcoming 80th birthday, McMahon named the locomotive "Ing. L.D. PORTA" when it was presented to the public on 11 December 2001. A second Garratt with similar technical specifications was built by Phil Girdlestone in South Africa and delivered to the FCAF in 2006. A third is now under construction again with similar technical features, in Ushuaia.

== Family ==
He was a devoted family man and he and his wife, Ana Marie, had four children. One of his three sons died of cancer at an early age. On 7 July 1976, during Argentina's Dirty War, his daughter was taken at gunpoint from her home and never seen again.

== See also ==
- Advanced steam technology
- South African Class 26 4-8-4
