= South African Class 26 4-8-4 =

1981 design of steam locomotive

South African Class 26 4-8-4 No. 3450 Red Devil
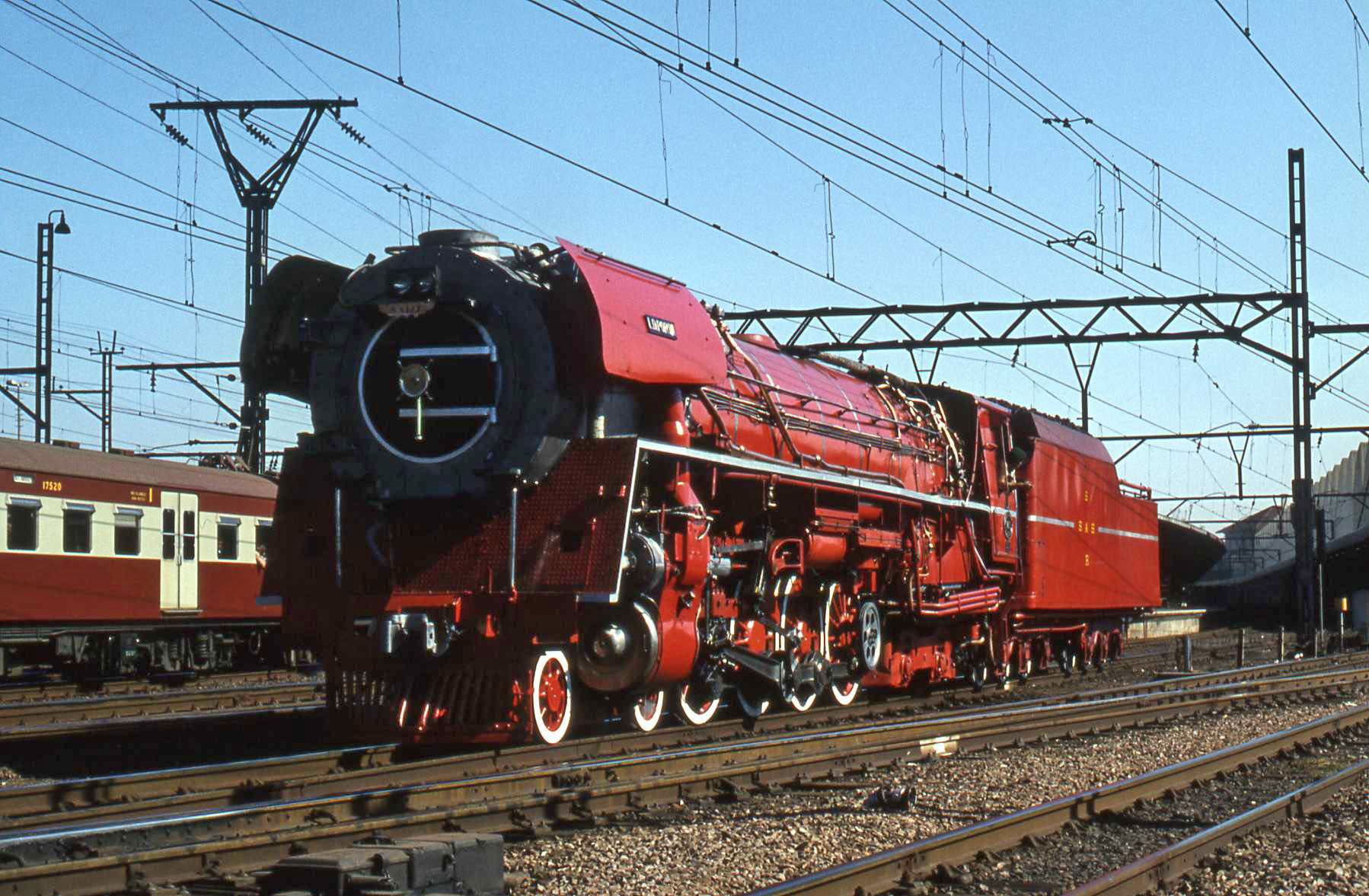
- The Red Devil at Pretoria, 25 April 1981
Type and origin
- Power type: Steam
- Designer: South African Railways (David Wardale)
- Builder: South African Railways
- Serial number: Henschel 28769
- Model: Class 26
- Build date: 1981
- Total produced: 1
Specifications
- Configuration
  - Whyte: 4-8-4 (Northern)
  - UIC: 2′D2′h2
- Driver: 2nd coupled axle
- Gauge: 3 ft 6 in (1,067 mm) Cape gauge
- Leading dia.: 30 in (762 mm)
- Coupled dia.: 60 in (1,524 mm)
- Trailing dia.: 30 in (762 mm)
- Tender wheels: 34 in (864 mm)
- Minimum curve: 275 ft (84 m)
- Wheelbase: 81 ft 4 11/16 in (24,808 mm)
  - Engine: 38 ft (11,582 mm)
  - Leading: 6 ft 10 in (2,083 mm)
  - Coupled: 15 ft 9 in (4,801 mm)
  - Trailing: 5 ft 6 in (1,676 mm)
  - Tender: 32 ft (9,754 mm)
  - Tender bogie: 10 ft (3,048 mm)
- Length
  - Over couplers: 91 ft 6 9/16 in (27,903 mm)
- Height: 13 ft (3,962 mm)
- Frame type: Cast
- Axle load: 18 LT 14 cwt (19,000 kg)
  - Leading: 21 LT 2 cwt (21,440 kg)
  - 1st coupled: 18 LT 10 cwt (18,800 kg)
  - 2nd coupled: 18 LT 14 cwt (19,000 kg)
  - 3rd coupled: 18 LT 12 cwt (18,900 kg)
  - 4th coupled: 18 LT 9 cwt (18,750 kg)
  - Trailing: 22 LT 12 cwt (22,960 kg)
  - Tender bogie: Bogie 1: 51 LT 6 cwt (52,120 kg); Bogie 2: 54 LT 5 cwt (55,120 kg)
  - Tender axle: 18 LT 1 cwt 2 qtr (18,370 kg)
- Adhesive weight: 74 LT 5 cwt (75,440 kg)
- Loco weight: 117 LT 9 cwt (119,300 kg)
- Tender weight: 105 LT 11 cwt (107,200 kg)
- Total weight: 232 LT (235,700 kg)
- Tender type: EW1 (3-axle bogies)
- Fuel type: Coal
- Fuel capacity: 20 LT (20.3 t)
- Water cap.: 10,500 imp gal (47,700 L)
- Fuel consumption: 700 km (430 mi) range
- Water consumption: 230 km (140 mi) range
- Firebox
  - Type: Round-top
  - Grate area: 70 sq ft (6.5 m^{2})
- Boiler
  - Type: Domeless
  - Pitch: 9 ft 1 5/8 in (2,784 mm)
  - Diameter: 6 ft 4 1/8 in (1,934 mm)
  - Tube plates: 19 ft (5,791 mm)
  - Small tubes: 158: 2 1/2 in (64 mm)
  - Large tubes: 40: 5 1/2 in (140 mm)
- Boiler pressure: 225 psi (1,551 kPa)
- Safety valve: Ross-pop
- Heating surface
  - Firebox: 294 sq ft (27.3 m^{2})
  - Tubes: 3,059 sq ft (284.2 m^{2})
  - Arch tubes: 37 sq ft (3.4 m^{2})
  - Total surface: 3,390 sq ft (315 m^{2})
- Superheater
  - Heating area: 1,014.3 sq ft (94.23 m^{2})
- Cylinders: Two
- Cylinder size: 24 in × 28 in (610 mm × 711 mm) bore x stroke
- Valve gear: Walschaerts
- Valve type: 310 mm (12.2 in) Piston
- Valve travel: 156 mm (6.1 in)
- Valve lap: 55 mm (2.2 in) steam lap 4 mm (0.16 in) exhaust lap
- Loco brake: Vacuum
- Couplers: AAR knuckle
Performance figures
- Maximum speed: 100 km/h (62 mph)
- Power output
  - Starting: Maximum recorded 3,350 kW (4,490 hp) @ 75.5 km/h (46.9 mph)
  - Continuous: Probable absolute 3,750 kW (5,030 hp) @ 100 km/h (62 mph)
- Tractive effort
  - Starting: 231 kN (52,000 lbf)
  - Continuous: 166 kN (37,000 lbf) @ 25% adh.
Career
- Operators: South African Railways; Spoornet
- Class: Class 26
- Number in class: 1
- Numbers: 3450
- Official name: L.D. Porta
- Nicknames: Red Devil
- Delivered: 1981
- First run: 6 February 1981

The South African Railways Class 26 4-8-4 of 1981, popularly known as the Red Devil, is a 4-8-4 steam locomotive which was rebuilt from a Class 25NC locomotive by mechanical engineer David Wardale from England while in the employ of the South African Railways. The rebuilding took place at the Salt River Works in Cape Town and was based on the principles developed by Argentinian mechanical engineer L.D. Porta.

== Origin ==
The original locomotive from which the Class 26 was rebuilt entered service in 1953 as the last of the Class 25NC 4-8-4 Northern type locomotives to be built. The Class 25 condensing and Class 25NC non-condensing locomotives were designed by the South African Railways (SAR) under the direction of L.C. Grubb, Chief Mechanical Engineer of the SAR from 1949 to 1954, and in conjunction with Henschel and Son. The first Class 25, no. 3451, most of the Class 25 condensing tenders and Class 25NC locomotives in the number range from 3412 to 3450 were built by Henschel, while Class 25NC locomotives in the number range from 3401 to 3411 and the other 89 Class 25 condensing locomotives were all built by the North British Locomotive Company in Glasgow, Scotland.

== Class 19D trial rebuilding ==
The rebuilding project suffered from the outset from, at best, half-hearted support on the side of the SAR management who had by then already decided to replace all steam traction with electric and diesel-electric power.

David Wardale, however, was determined to demonstrate that the efficiency of steam locomotives could be drastically increased by making use of a Gas Producer Combustion System (GPCS) to produce more steam for less fuel consumed, and the Lempor exhaust system developed by Argentinian chief mechanical engineer L.D. Porta to use steam with maximum efficiency.

As a trial run, Wardale was allowed to carry out extensive modifications on a Krupp-built Class 19D 4-8-2 Mountain type branchline locomotive, no. 2644. A GPCS and tandem dual Lempor exhausts were installed along with some other small improvements which included high mounted smoke deflectors.

The modifications enabled the locomotive to achieve significantly higher power and lower fuel consumption than other unmodified Class 19Ds, which resulted in Wardale being allowed to continue with the building of a Class 26 prototype.

== Red Devil rebuilding ==
Work on Class 25NC no. 3450 began at the end of 1979. The manufacturing of all new items and modifications to existing parts were carried out at the SAR workshops at Salt River in Cape Town, Bloemfontein, Beaconsfield in Kimberley, Koedoespoort in Pretoria and Pietermaritzburg, the work being allocated to the workshop best suited to the particular task at hand.

=== Combustion ===
The primary objectives of the modifications were threefold.

- To improve the combustion and steaming rate.
- To reduce the emission of wasteful black smoke.
- To overcome the problem of clinkering.

This was achieved by the use of a single-stage gas producer, the GPCS, which relies on the gasification of coal on a low temperature firebed so that the gases are then fully burnt above the firebed. It minimises the amount of air being drawn up through the firebed, the main source of air required for combustion being through ancillary air intakes located above the firebed.

The most serious waste of fuel in a conventional steam locomotive is the loss of unburned coal particles from the fuel bed because of the rapid flow of air through the grate. With the GPCS, the coal is therefore heated to drive off the volatile components which are then burned in the secondary air admitted above the grate. The result is improved combustion, thereby minimising black smoke, which is evidence of incomplete combustion with the result that unburnt coal particles are ejected through the exhaust.

=== Engine modifications ===
Amongst many minor detail improvements, other major modifications to the engine included the following:

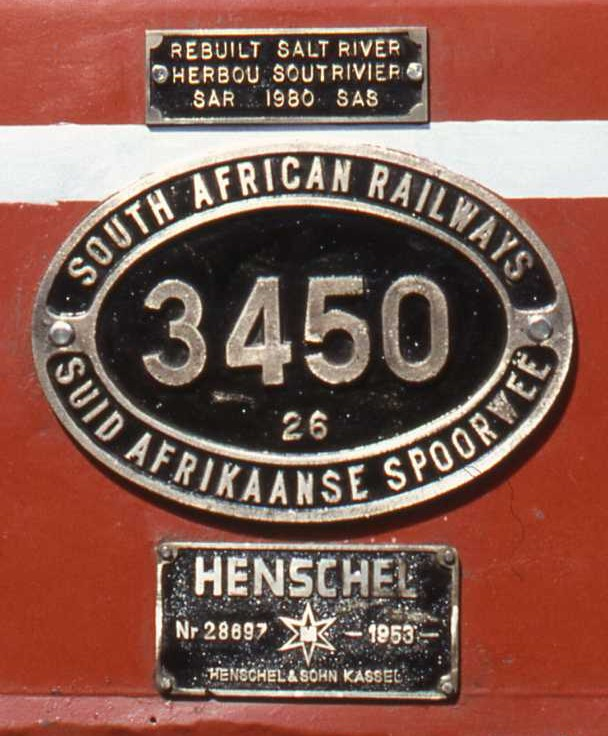

- A lengthened smokebox to accommodate the tandem double Lempor exhausts.
- Offset double chimneys.
- A feedwater-heater between the chimneys.
- Improved lubrication on cylinder and valve liner rubbing surfaces.
- A booster for increased superheating.
- New piston valves.
- Articulated valve spindles.
- New cooled valve liners.
- Redesigned chromium cast iron rings and valve liners with streamlined cylinder ports.
- New cylinder liners.
- Altered valve gear.
- Herdner starting valves.
- Air sanding.
- An altered self-cleaning smokebox.
- Enlarged steam chests.
- Direct steam pipes.
- Improved pistons.
- Improved valve and piston rod packings.
- An improved variable stroke lubricator drive.
- Improved insulation.
- Improved Walschaerts valve gear with computer calculated dimensions.
- Continental European style high mounted exhaust deflectors, curved round but not parallel to the smokebox.

=== Tender modifications ===
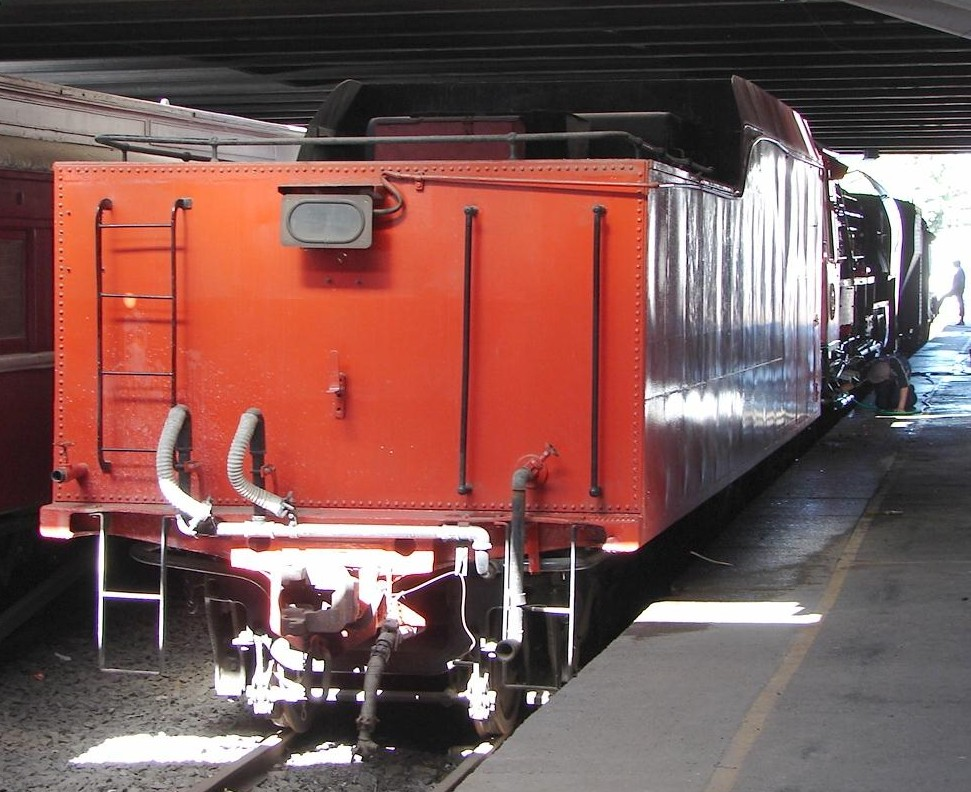
The Red Devil's Type EW1 tender with raised coal bunker sides

The coal capacity of the Class 25NC's Type EW1 tender was increased from 18 long tons (18.3 tonnes) to about 20 long tons (20.3 tonnes) by raising the coal bunker sides.

With all the modifications done, the total weight of the locomotive in full working order had been increased from 231 tonnes (227 long tons) to about 236 tonnes (232 long tons).

=== Reclassification ===
These extensive modifications justified reclassification and the locomotive became the first and only Class 26, although its original Class 25NC number 3450 was retained. The Class 26 number plates, builder's plate and the Salt River rebuild plate which were attached to the cab sides at the time, have since been replaced with plates inscribed "Transnet National Collection".

The Henschel works plates which were mounted on the cab sides of 3450 were not the originals, but were taken off Class GMAM 4-8-2+2-8-4 Garratt no. 4068, Henschel works number 28697, which was withdrawn from service and stored at De Aar at about the time no. 3450 was being rebuilt to Class 26. The Red Devil's actual builder's works number, 28769, had the same digits, albeit in a different order.

== Trials ==
=== Test runs ===
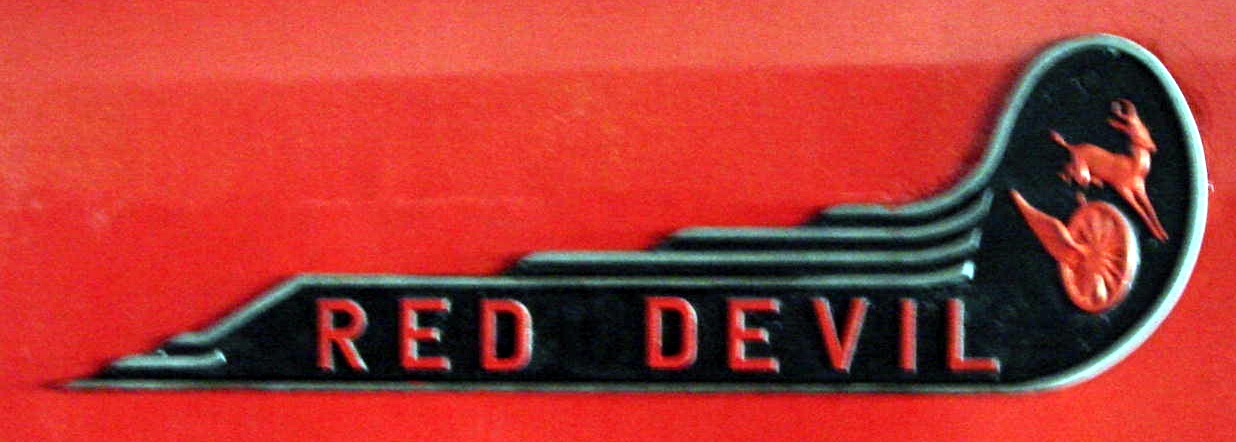

The locomotive was painted in a red livery and was officially named L.D. Porta after the Argentinian engineer responsible for some of the ideas and developments incorporated in its modification. Initial steaming and yard running took place on Thursday 5 February 1981 and the first test trip, running light from Salt River to Bellville and back, took place the following day. On Monday 9 February the rebuilt no. 3450 hauled its first three-coach train filled with various railway officials, staff and media representatives to Dal Josafat, about 66 kilometres (41 miles) from Cape Town. In subsequent Cape Town press reports the locomotive was dubbed the Red Devil. The nickname eventually became official and the locomotive now bears it on the Class 25NC type exhaust deflectors which later replaced the Continental European style exhaust deflectors.

=== Performance ===
Compared to an unmodified Class 25NC, the Red Devil achieved a 28% measured saving on coal and a 30% measured saving on water, measured during freight service, and a 43% increase in drawbar power based on the maximum recorded drawbar power. Its approximate maximum range in full-load freight service on 1% to 1¼% grades is 700 kilometres (430 miles) based on its coal capacity, and 230 kilometres (140 miles) based on its water capacity.

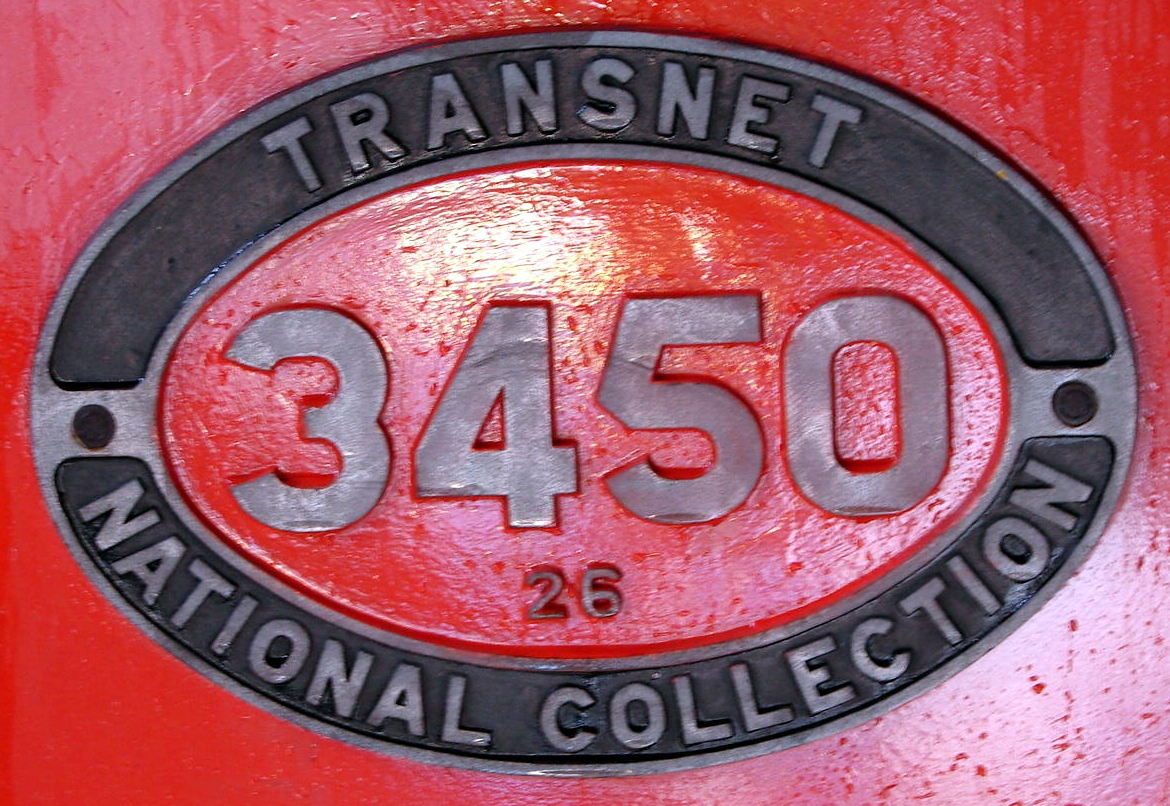

The drawbar figures were extremely conservatively calculated. Using both mechanical and electronic indicating equipment, the Class 26 recorded 4,492 indicated horsepower (3,350 kilowatts) on tests between Pretoria and Witbank, a world record for a narrow gauge locomotive. According to the dynamometer car, this was then developing 3,787 equivalent drawbar horsepower. However, the drawbar outputs were measured with less accuracy owing to the malfunctioning of the dynamometer car, which gave generally inconsistent results throughout the various tests made. The equivalent drawbar outputs were unacceptably low relative to the indicated ones and gave an unrealistically high locomotive rolling resistance. The highest recorded equivalent drawbar power of 3,787 horsepower (2,824 kilowatts) at 74 kilometres per hour (46 miles per hour) is therefore most probably lower than that which was actually achieved, but even this low figure is 43% higher than that which was possible with the Class 25NC, exceeding the original claim of a 35% increase. Extrapolating the conservative maximum equivalent drawbar power-speed curve predicts 3,000 kilowatts (4,000 horsepower) at 100 kilometres per hour (62 miles per hour), 52% higher than the 25NC maximum.

The Red Devil's rated freight loads are 700 tonnes (690 long tons) on 2% grades, 1,080 tonnes (1,060 long tons) on 1¼% grades and 1,320 tonnes (1,300 long tons) on 1% grades. The maximum recorded freight load hauled relative to gradient was 900 tonnes (890 long tons) on 2% grades, and it can haul a 650 tonnes (640 long tons) passenger train at a constant speed of 100 kilometres per hour (62 miles per hour) on 1% grades.

=== Drawback ===
The Red Devil's great power, however, also turned out to be its one fault. The Class 25NC already had problems with wheelslip and the much more powerful Class 26, with essentially identical dimensions as them, was much worse. It was a poor performer at starting or at low speeds on steep gradients. On its first working run from Pretoria to Witbank in Transvaal, a signal stop on a 1 in 50 (2%) gradient resulted in great struggles to restart, eventually causing about 20 minutes of delay. Neither the Herdner valves nor the air sanding seemed able to overcome these problems.

== Similar projects ==
The success achieved with the South African Class 26 can be considered as the final development of a dying breed. Although it ended up as the most efficient and powerful steam locomotive on South African rails, electric and diesel-electric locomotives had already nearly completely replaced steam by the early 1980s and the project was halted with only the one prototype ever built.

=== Class 25NC no. 3454 B.I. Ebing ===
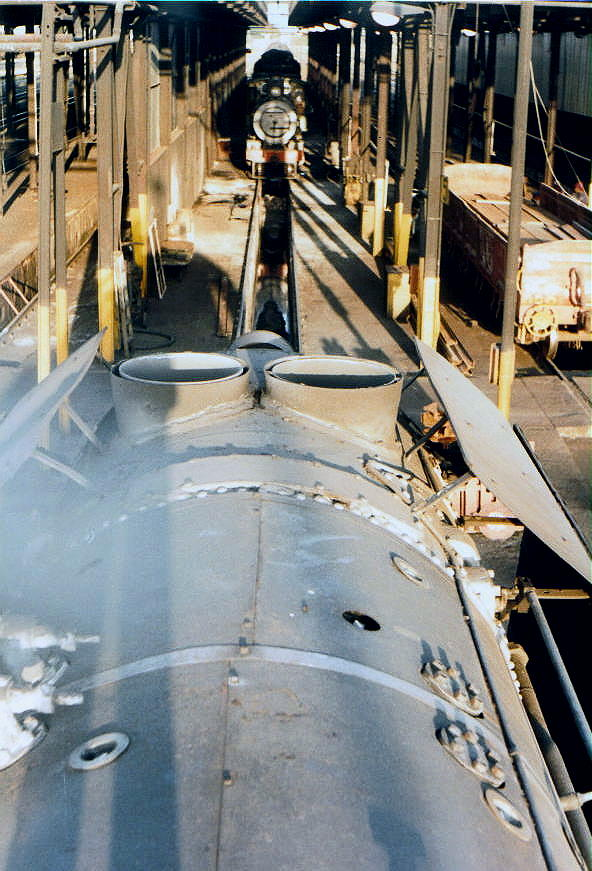
Class 25NC no. 3454's Dual Lempor chimneys and extended smoke deflectors

Following Wardale's departure from the SAR, the Beaconsfield workshops carried out a minimal modification on an NBL-built ex Class 25 condenser, no. 3454 which had been converted to a free-exhausting non-condensing Class 25NC named B.I. Ebing.

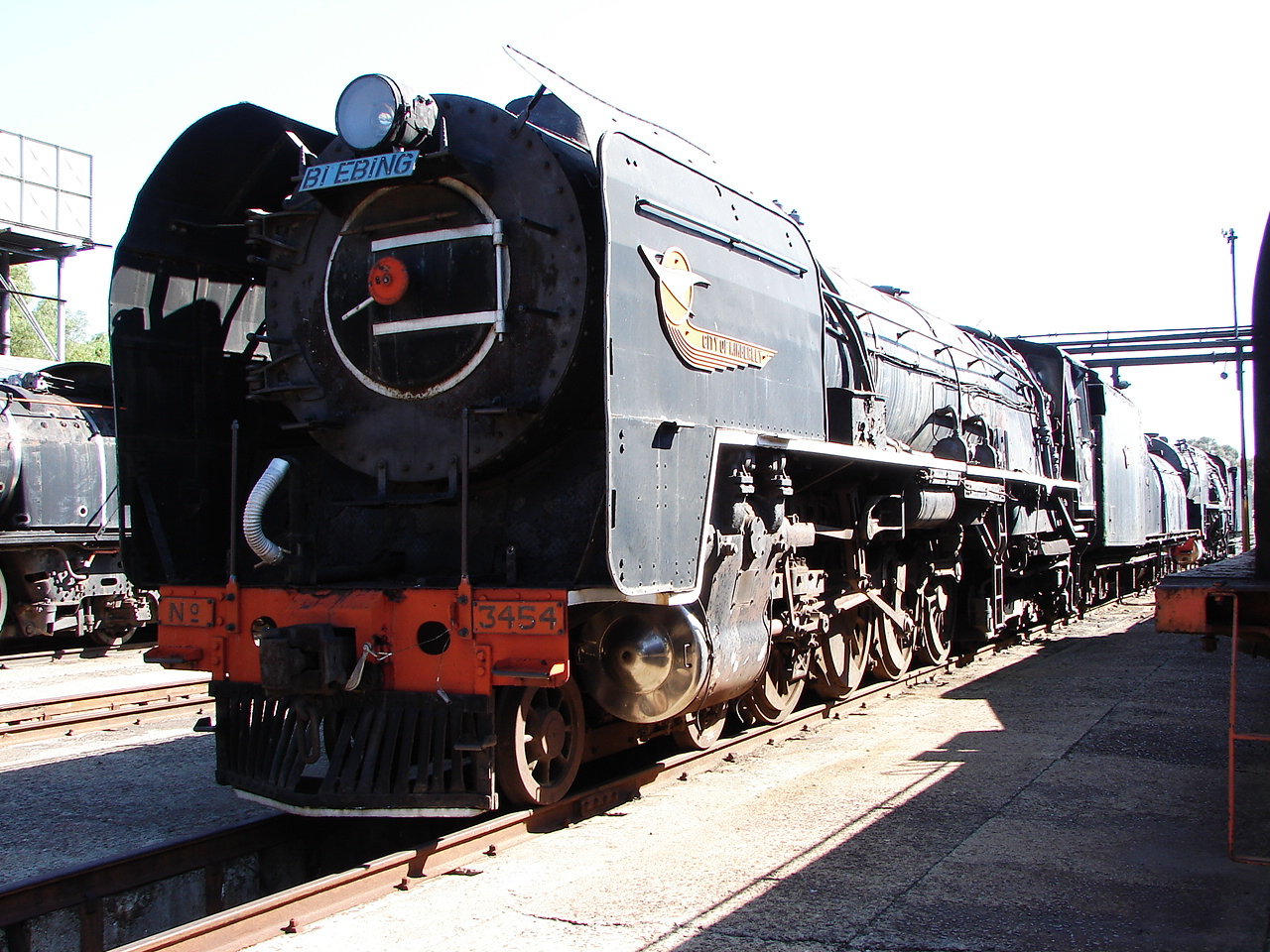
Dual Lempor no. 3454, B.I. Ebing

Modifications on this locomotive consisted mainly of equipping it with a dual Lempor style exhaust system and extending its smoke deflectors upwards and curved around the smokebox. In order to save the cost of extending the smokebox, the chimneys were installed side by side instead of in tandem just like on the earlier Wardale locomotives. Apart from the blastpipe and the chimneys, no other modifications were incorporated.

The modified No. 3454 was put to work in February 1985. Results, as reported by locomotive crews and shed staff, were noticeable savings in coal and water consumption whenever compared to a standard Class 25NC, although the amounts were no longer quantified. The locomotive was also noticeably much more sure-footed than the Class 26, which tended to slip every time it started.

=== American Coal Enterprises 3000 ===
Even though the Red Devil project proved that steam locomotives built according to modern principles would improve upon older steam technology by a large margin, it came too late to prevent dieselisation in South Africa. Similar projects such as Ross Rowland's ACE 3000 in the United States in 1985 and later in China also failed to revive official interest in steam traction.

=== ACR Class NG G16A ===
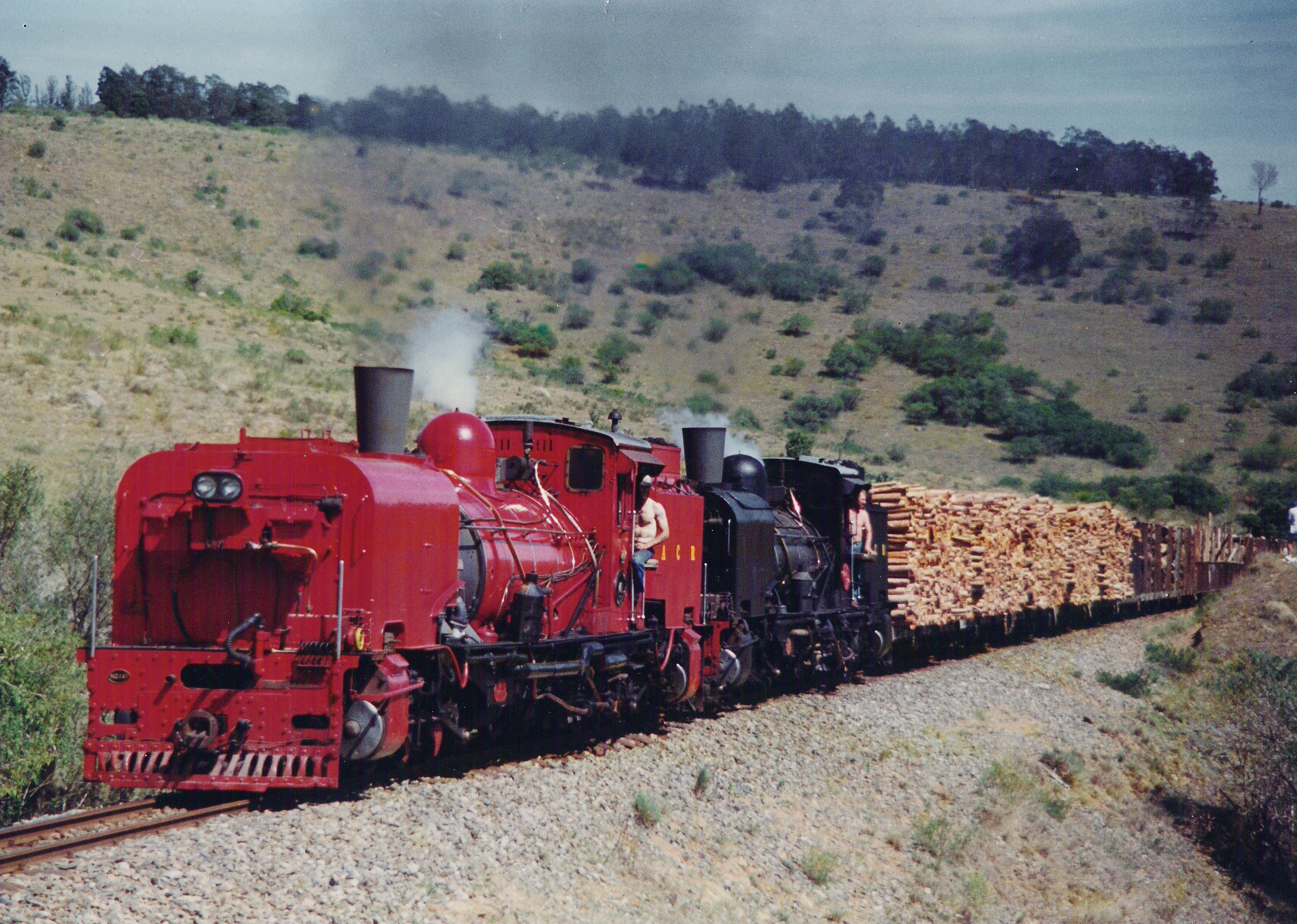
ACR Class NG G16A no's 141 & 155 climbing from Bongwana to Nqabeni, c. 1992

In South Africa, two Class NG G16 narrow gauge Garratt locomotives of the Alfred County Railway were rebuilt in 1989 and 1990, using technology similar to that used by Wardale in the creation of the Red Devil. The rebuilding incorporated a gas producing combustion system (GPCS), Lempor exhausts, an improved spark arrester, lightweight multi-ring articulated piston valves, improved valve events and improved mechanical lubrication.

The rebuilding was done by mechanical engineer Phil Girdlestone, who was employed as Chief Mechanical Engineer of the ACR primarily for this purpose. The work was carried out at Port Shepstone, and the first locomotive to undergo the treatment was the Beyer, Peacock-built no. 141 in 1989. The modified no. 141 was also painted red and was consequently soon nicknamed the Red Dragon. The second locomotive, the Hunslet-Taylor-built no. 155, was rebuilt in 1990, but it retained its traditional ex-SAR black livery. Both modified locomotives were reclassified to Class NG G16A.

=== 5AT Advanced Technology Steam Locomotive ===
The most recent such project was Wardale's proposed 5AT Advanced Technology Steam Locomotive in the United Kingdom in 2001, but the same factors which prevented further development of modern steam locomotives in South Africa, the United States and China were likely to also prevent the 5AT proposal from becoming reality.

== Modifications ==
The main picture shows the Red Devil in Pretoria just over two months after the rebuilding was completed. Several modifications were done to it later, most of which Wardale considered to be actually detrimental to the performance of the locomotive. In the process the Red Devil was significantly changed to be more conventional by caretakers who did not fully agree with the basis of the recent conversion. Some of these modifications are externally visible when comparing the main picture with the later pictures below.

== Preservation ==
The Red Devil last ran on a steam excursion on 23 September 2003 and was later mothballed, being cared for by private enthusiasts on behalf of the Transnet Heritage Foundation (THF) at Monument Station in Cape Town. As of November 2015, the locomotive had become the subject of contractual negotiations between the THF and the newly formed Ceres Railway Company Limited, who wanted to put the locomotive back into service to haul weekend excursions between Cape Town and Robertson, Western Cape as part of its now reopened Ceres branch line project. On 13 July 2018, she undertook her first voyage in 15 years later. The agreement with the THF allows the locomotive to only operate during the South African winter months. The Red Devil is currently being stored in a Ceres Railway Maintenance Depot in Foreshore, Cape Town.

== Illustration ==
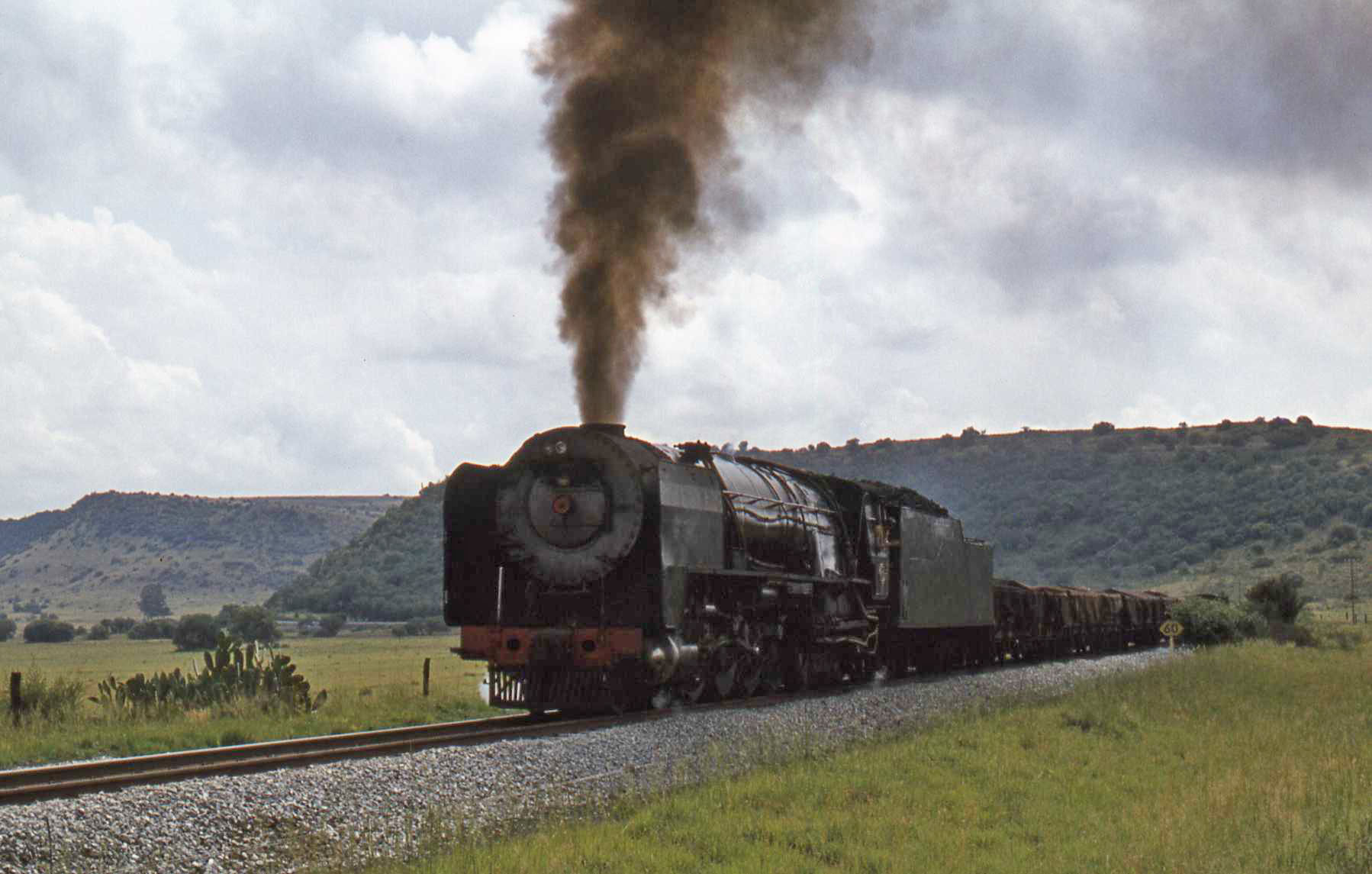
Class 25NC no. 3450 near Kloofeind, 28 March 1978

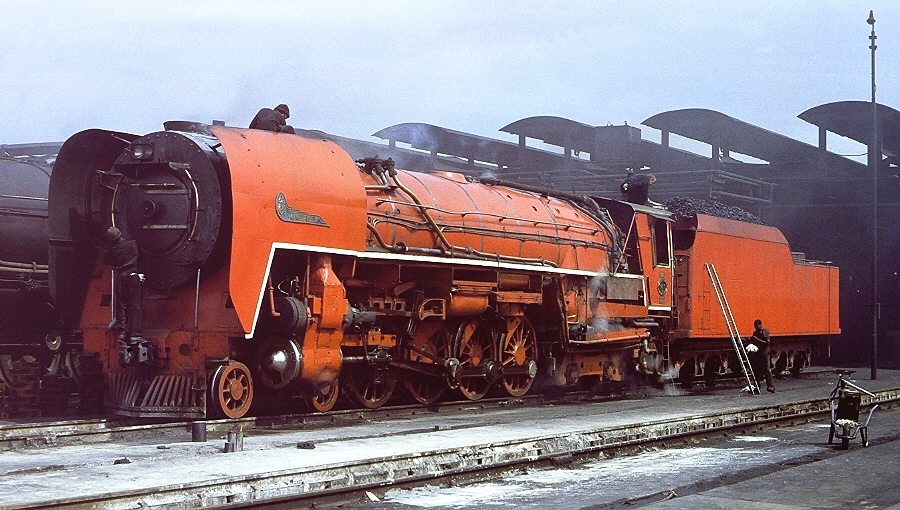
At Beaconsfield Depot, Kimberley, Northern Cape, c. April 1985

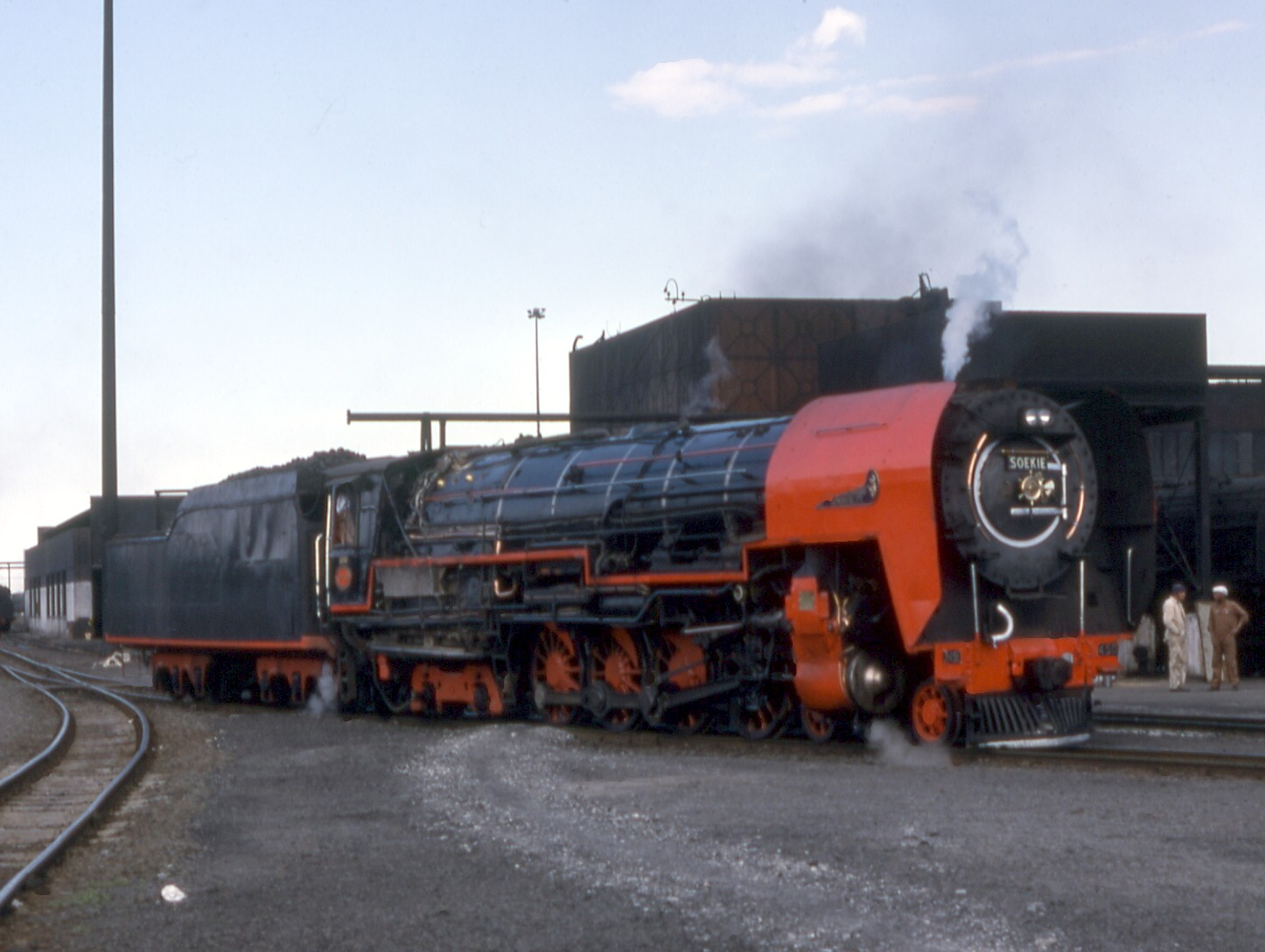
Named Soekie and in black livery at De Aar shed, c. April 1988

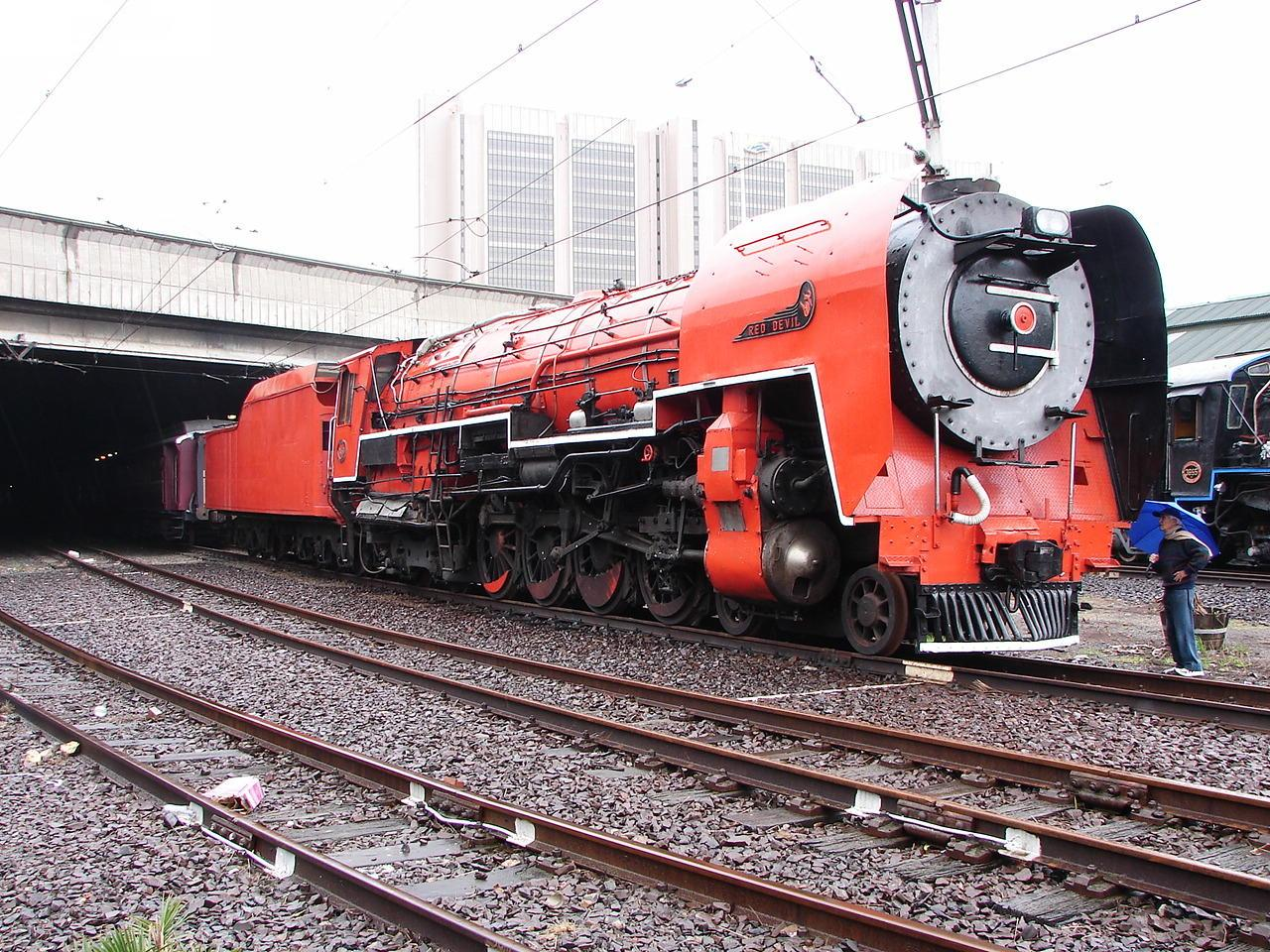
At Monument Station, Cape Town, on 8 August 2010

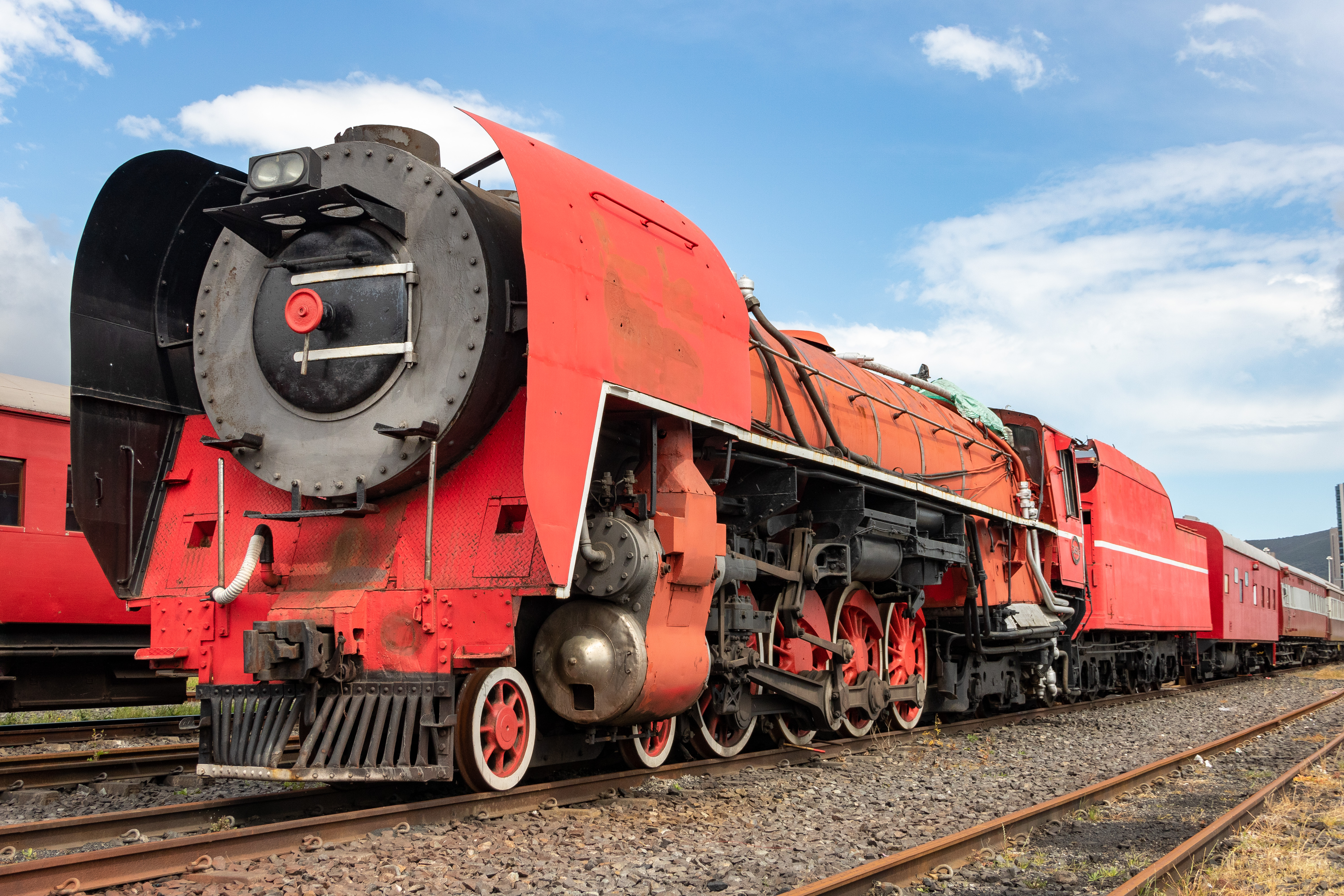
Locomotive as of September 2023
