= ACE 3000 =

Proposed and never-built modern steam locomotive

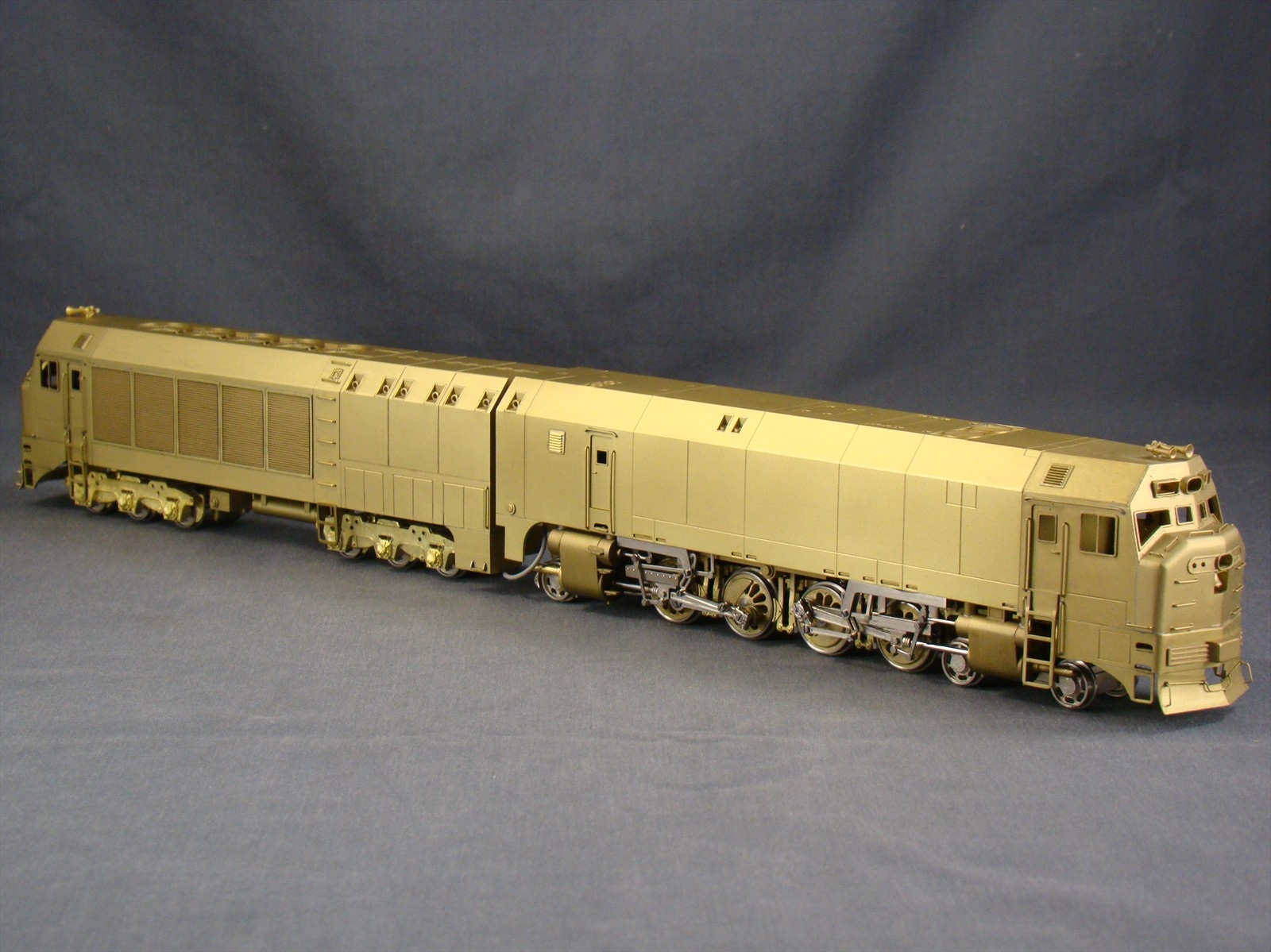
- Concept model of ACE 3000
Type and origin
- Power type: Steam
- Designer: Ross Rowland; American Coal Enterprises
- Build date: Never built
- Total produced: 0
Specifications
- Configuration
  - Whyte: 4-8-2 (Second and third axles connected internally)
  - UIC: 2'D1'
- Gauge: 1,435 mm (4 ft 8 1/2 in)
- Driver dia.: 54 in (1.372 m)
- Boiler pressure: 300 psi (2.07 MPa)
- Superheater: Type "E"
- Cylinders: Four (Compound)
- Valve gear: Walschaerts
Performance figures
- Maximum speed: 70 mph (113 km/h)
- Power output: 3,000 hp (2,240 kW)
- Tractive effort
  - Starting: 70,000 lbf (311.38 kN)
  - Continuous: 100,000 lbf (444.82 kN)
Career
- Class: ACE 3000
- Disposition: Never built

The ACE 3000 was a proposed modern 4-8-2 coal-burning steam locomotive design for Ross Rowland's ACE 3000 Project and for the American Coal Enterprises, the locomotive was designed by Ross Rowland and was developed by American Coal Enterprises in the late 1970s.

== Testing ==
In 1985, Chesapeake and Ohio 614 was modified to enhance performance under the guidance of David Wardale. For several weeks between January and February 1985, No. 614 (renumbered to 614-T, with the "T" denoting testing) had hauled several coal trains between Huntington, West Virginia and Hinton, West Virginia.

When the 1970s came, the 1970s oil crisis had hit and it was causing problems for the railroads that had dieselized in order to cut costs and operating diesels was getting more expensive.

== Design ==
Development of the modern 4-8-2 coal-burning steam locomotive that was classified as the ACE 3000 was done by American Coal Enterprises, which was founded to raise funds to build this steam locomotive using modern technologies that could make steam just as efficient as diesels, such as multiple-unit operation, and computer-operated boiler vigilance.

The locomotive was originally designed to be a steam turbine locomotive, but was instead redesigned to utilize a traditional reciprocating drive as the development of the locomotive had continued.

Although it looks like a duplex-drive locomotive, it was a 4-8-2 with internal rods connecting the second and third driving axle.

At the end, there were even plans drawn up for a Garratt version, however, this drastic change from the original concept would make the C&O (now CSX Transportation), their number one customer before this, withdraw from the project and the company went bankrupt shortly after with no examples of the ACE 3000 built.

== See also ==
- Advanced steam technology
- Livio Dante Porta
- DR 52 8055
- 5AT Advanced Technology Steam Locomotive
- South African Class 26 4-8-4
