= Caustic embrittlement =

Caustic embrittlement is the phenomenon in which the material of a boiler becomes brittle due to the accumulation of caustic substances.

== Cause ==
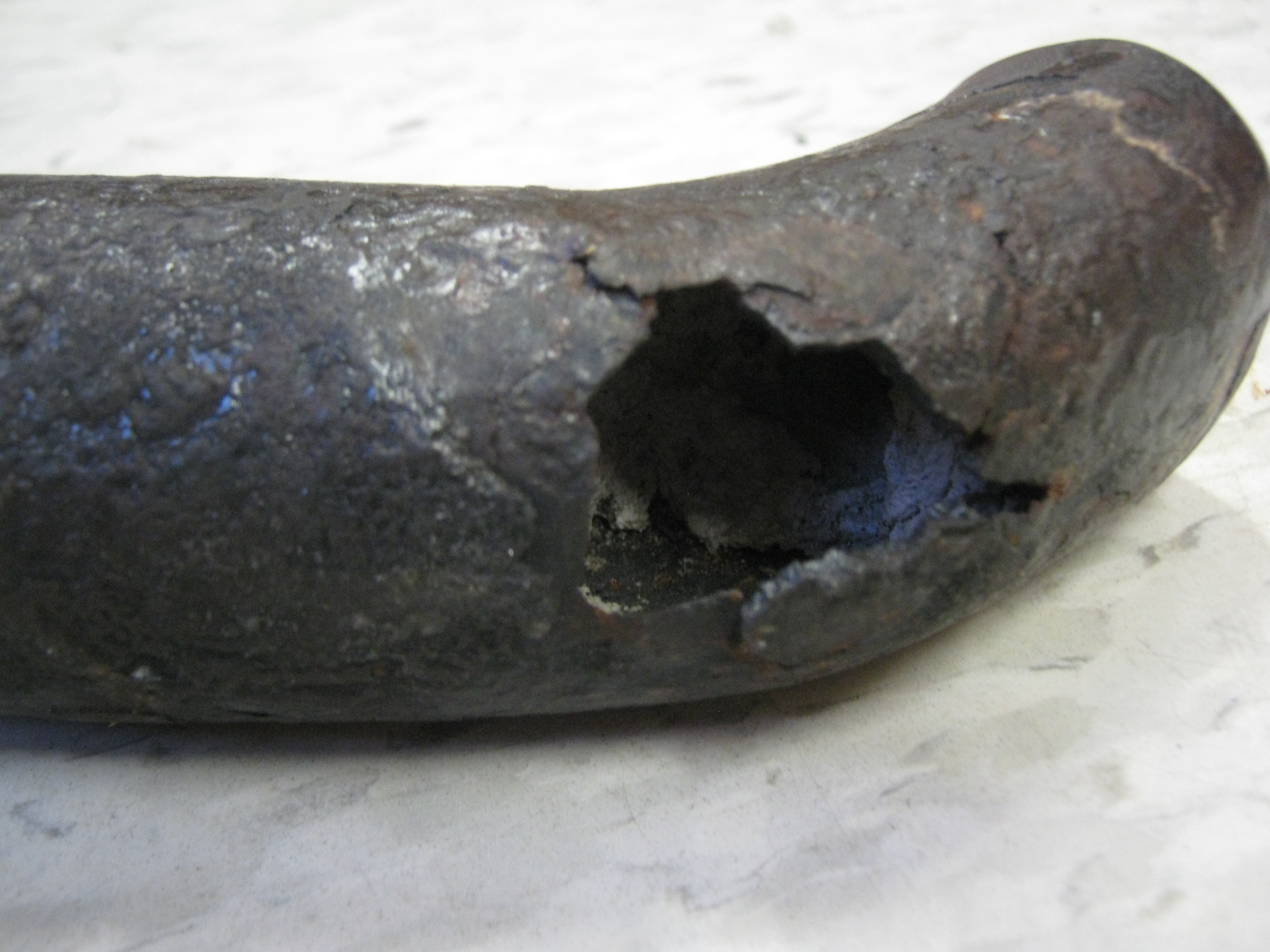
A tube damaged by caustic embrittlement. White caustic deposits can be seen inside.

As water evaporates in the boiler, the concentration of sodium carbonate increases in the boiler. In high pressure boilers, sodium carbonate is used in softening of water by lime soda process, due to this some sodium carbonate maybe left behind in the water. As the concentration of sodium carbonate increases, it undergoes hydrolysis to form sodium hydroxide.

Na_{2}CO_{3} + H_{2}O → 2NaOH + CO_{2}

The presence of sodium hydroxide makes the water alkaline in nature. This alkaline water enters minute cracks present in the inner walls of the boiler by capillary action. Inside the cracks, the water evaporates and the amount of hydroxide keeps increasing progressively. The concentrated area with high stress works as anode and diluted area works as cathode. At anode, sodium hydroxide attacks the surrounding material and then dissolves the iron of the boiler as sodium ferrate forming rust. This causes embrittlement of boiler parts like rivets, bends and joints, which are under stress.

== Prevention ==
This can be prevented by using sodium phosphate (Na_{3}PO_{4}) instead of sodium carbonate as softening reagents. What happens is that its molecules will get inside the hair-line crack and block it, as a result of which sodium hydroxide, even if it is there, will not be able to come in contact with iron, and no reaction will be there. Adding tannin or lignin to boiler water blocks the hair-line cracks and prevents infiltration of NaOH into these areas. Adding Na_{2}SO_{4} to boiler water also blocks the hair-line cracks.
