= Argentina (locomotive) =

Argentine compound steam locomotive

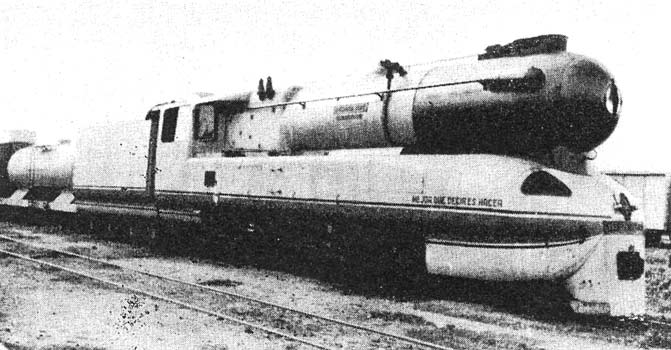
- Argentina in 1969
Type and origin
- References: Odom & Bane 2014, pp. 4–9.
- Power type: Steam
- Designer: Livio Dante Porta
- Builder: Ing. Livio Dante Porta & Co. Ltd.
- Rebuild date: 1947–1950
- Number rebuilt: 1
Specifications
- Configuration
  - Whyte: 4-8-0
  - UIC: 2'D
- Gauge: 1,000 mm (3 ft 3 3/8 in) meter gauge
- Driver dia.: 50 in (1,270.0 mm)
- Axle load: 30,258 lb (13.725 t)
- Adhesive weight: 121,034 lb (54.900 t)
- Loco weight: 152,339 lb (69.100 t)
- Fuel type: Coal
- Firebox
  - Grate area: 42 sq ft (3.9 m^{2})
- Boiler: 1,420 mm (55.9 in)
- Boiler pressure: 285 lbf/in^{2} (1,965.0 kPa)
- Heating surface
  - Firebox: 200 sq ft (19 m^{2})
- Cylinders: Four: 2 high-pressure (inside), 2 low-pressure (outside)
- High-pressure cylinder: 14.2 in × 26 in (360.7 mm × 660.4 mm)
- Low-pressure cylinder: 23 in × 22 in (584.2 mm × 558.8 mm)
Performance figures
- Maximum speed: 75 mph (121 km/h)
- Power output: 2,120 hp (1,580 kW)
- Tractive effort: 35,274 lbf (156.9 kN)
- Factor of adh.: 3.43
Career
- Operators: General Manuel Belgrano Railway
- Official name: Presidente Perón (1951–1955); Argentina (since 1955)
- Nicknames: La Justicalista; La Pochita
- Locale: Argentina
- Retired: 1961
- Disposition: Scrapped

Argentina, (Note: Sometimes erroneously named La Argentina (lit. 'The Argentina')) originally named Presidente Perón and known informally as La Justicalista and La Pochita, is a 4-8-0 compound steam locomotive. It was the first designed by Livio Dante Porta. The locomotive had an unprecedented power-to-weight ratio and thermal efficiency, and is considered one of the most efficient locomotives of all time.

The locomotive was rebuilt from a 1906 4-6-2 steam locomotive known as Córdoba Central Railway No. 2011. The locomotive was built from 1947 to 1950, and unveiled in 1951 at an exhibition in Diagonal Norte. It ran freight service from 1951 to 1961, after which it was stored in several locomotive depots. It was ultimately stored in Tucumán, and was later put on display at a railroad museum from 1996 to 2001. After several attempts to save the locomotive, Argentina was abandoned and partially scrapped.

== Construction and design ==
Argentine engineer Livio Dante Porta originally conceived his first locomotive as a 2-8-2, which would have been built from scratch. For simplicity and cost, Porta instead decided to rebuild another meter-gauge locomotive: Córdoba Central Railway No. 2011, a B22 class 4-6-2 steam locomotive built in 1906. Funding for the locomotive was provided by the National Development Bank, where Porta met Argentina's president, Juan Domingo Perón.

Argentina was the first steam locomotive built entirely within Argentina. The locomotive was built at the Port of Rosario by Ing. Livio Dante Porta & Co. Ltd from 1947 to 1950. The B22 was converted from a 4-6-2 to a 4-8-0 to increase its adhesive weight. The two-cylinder locomotive was converted into a compound locomotive: the final design makes use of two internal high-pressure cylinders and two external low-pressure cylinders. When operating, steam would be superheated between the two pairs of cylinders. Other components include a Belpaire firebox, feedwater heater, and a Kylchap exhaust system.

The locomotive was the first to feature a gas-producer combustion system (GPCS), which Porta had created. The GPCS consisted of air being drawn in from over the firebed, and steam being injected from underneath it. The system was used to reduce the clinker that would usually form in a locomotive's firebox.

In a 1969 journal, Porta had stated that his rebuild was based on those done by French engineer André Chapelon. Argentina was streamlined in the style of steam locomotives in the United States, making it the first locomotive to be streamlined in Argentina. It was painted in white and light blue to represent the Flag of Argentina. Most of the locomotive's construction—including the firebox—was welded with mild steel.

== History ==
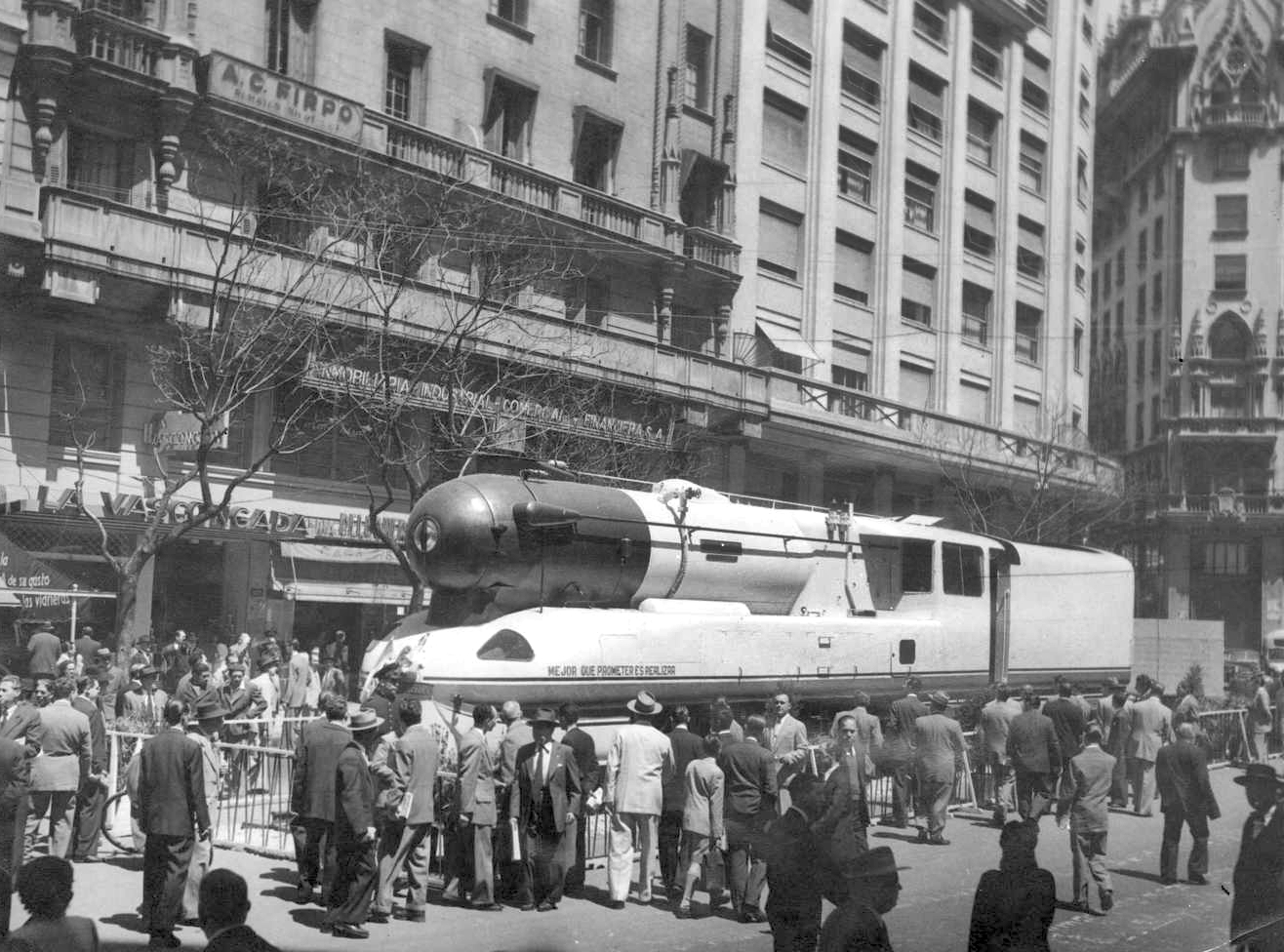
The locomotive, named Presidente Perón, at Diagonal Norte in 1951. The text near its front reads "better to carry out than to promise" (Spanish: Mejor que prometer es realizar).

In 1949, (Note: The year is disputed. The Coalition for Sustainable Rail states either 1949 or 1950, and The Guardian and Billiken state 1949.) the locomotive was taken by a horse-drawn trailer to the center of Buenos Aires, and unveiled in October 1951 at Diagonal Norte. The locomotive was part of the Exposición de la Nueva Argentina (lit. 'Exhibition of the New Argentina'), a technology exhibition. To prevent any parts from being stolen, Porta and his wife, Ana, had slept in the locomotive's cabin overnight. It was then named Presidente Perón and painted with Perón's slogans, including "better to do than to say" (Spanish: Mejor que decir es hacer) and "better to carry out than to promise" (Spanish: Mejor que prometer es realizar). The locomotive was informally known as La Justicialista (lit. 'The Justicialist') and La Pochita.

After the exhibition, Presidente Perón began freight service on the General Manuel Belgrano Railway. The locomotive was often coupled to an auxiliary water tender for additional water. While designed to run at 75 miles per hour (121 km/h), Presidente Perón did not exceed 65 miles per hour (105 km/h) due to the railroad's condition. At this speed, the locomotive could haul trains weighing up to 1,200 long tons (1,200 t). During its service, Presidente Perón had an unprecedented power-to-weight ratio and thermal efficiency, and is considered one of the most efficient locomotives of all time. The Guardian writer Johnathan Glancey compared the power-to-weight ratio to "a bantamweight boxer packing the punch of Mike Tyson". Following Perón's overthrow in 1955, the locomotive was renamed Argentina. Sections of the streamlining near the valve gear were removed for accessibility.

During its service, dieselization had begun. In 1961, (Note: The Coalition for Sustainable Rail and The Guardian state 1961, while La Capital and Diario UNO state 1960.) Argentina was retired from service after accumulating 70,000 kilometers (43,000 mi). Argentina was initially stored at a locomotive depot in La Plata, where it stayed from 1961 to the 1970s. It was then moved to a disused depot in Tafí Viejo, Tucumán, where it continued to be stored until the depot opened as a railroad museum in 1996. It was repainted black, and its streamlining that was removed during its freight service was later refitted onto Argentina. In 2000, Porta had planned to return Argentina into an operable state, but had abandoned the plan following the December 2001 riots in Argentina. The museum subsequently closed.

Over time, the locomotive's parts were stolen and sold for scrap. In 2004, a group of engineers from the United Kingdom had found the locomotive in Tucumán, which—although rusted and vandalized—was virtually intact. It was believed by many railroad enthusiasts that the locomotive had been completely scrapped. The group, led by IT expert Martyn Bane, began a fundraiser for £10,000 (equivalent to £15,400 in 2025) to move and restore Argentina, which was unsuccessful. Since 2014, the only remnants of the locomotive are its frames, cylinders, and boiler. Since January 2026, the remnants of the locomotive are inaccessible to the public.

== See also ==
- SNCF 240P—class of rebuilt 4-8-0 locomotives designed by Andre Chapelon
