= Advanced steam technology =

Evolution of steam power beyond mainstream mid-20th-century implementations

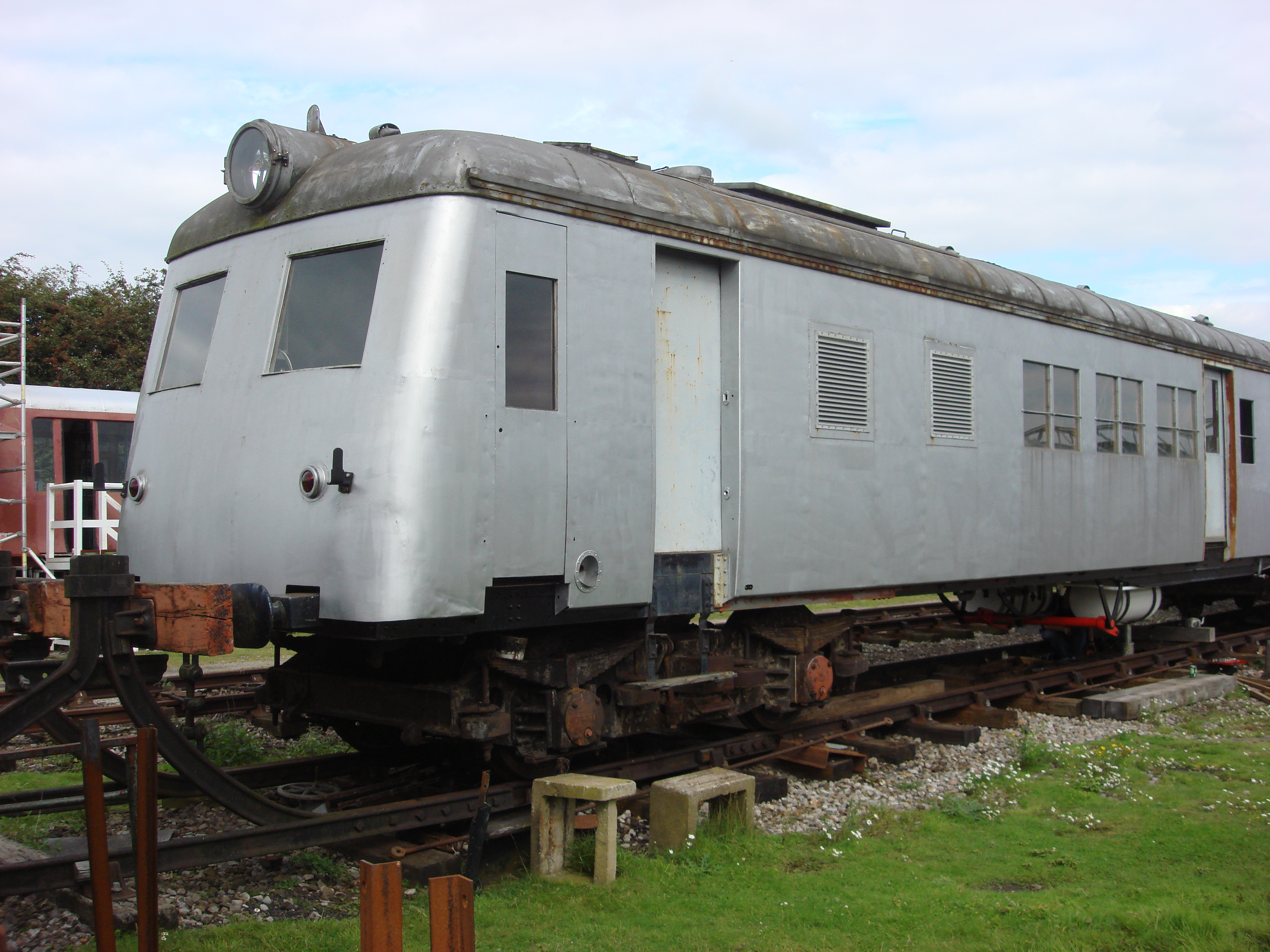
Sentinel-Cammell steam railcar

Advanced steam technology (sometimes known as modern steam) reflects an approach to the technical development of the steam engine intended for a wider variety of applications than has recently been the case. Particular attention has been given to endemic problems that led to the demise of steam power in small to medium-scale commercial applications: excessive pollution, maintenance costs, labour-intensive operation, low power/weight ratio, and low overall thermal efficiency.

Steam power has generally been superseded by the internal combustion engine or by electrical power drawn from an electrical grid. The only steam installations that are in widespread use are the highly efficient thermal power plants used for generating electricity on a large scale. In contrast, the proposed steam engines may be for stationary, road, rail, or marine use.

== Improving steam traction ==
Although most references to "Modern Steam" apply to developments since the 1970s, certain aspects of advanced steam technology can be discerned throughout the 20th century, notably automatic boiler control along with rapid startup.

=== Abner Doble ===
In 1922, Abner Doble developed an electro-mechanical system that reacted simultaneously to steam temperature and pressure, starting and stopping the feed pumps whilst igniting and cutting out the burner according to boiler pressure. The contraflow monotube boiler had a working pressure of 750–1,200 psi (5.17–8.27 MPa) but contained so little water in circulation as to present no risk of explosion. This type of boiler was continuously developed in the US, Britain and Germany throughout the 1930s and into the 1950s for use in cars, buses, trucks, railcars, shunting locomotives (US; switchers), a speedboat and, in 1933, a converted Travel Air 2000 biplane.

=== Sentinel ===
In the UK, Sentinel Waggon Works developed a vertical water-tube boiler running at 275 psi (1.90 MPa) which was used in road vehicles, shunting locomotives and railcars. Steam could be raised much more quickly than with a conventional locomotive boiler.

=== Anderson and Holcroft ===
Trials of the Anderson condensing system took place on Britain's Southern Railway between 1930 and 1935. Condensing apparatuses have not been widely used on steam locomotives due to the additional complexity and weight, but they offer four potential advantages:

- Improved thermal efficiency
- Reduced water consumption
- Reduced boiler maintenance for limescale removal
- Reduced noise

The Anderson condensing system uses a process known as mechanical vapor recompression. It was devised by a Glasgow marine engineer, Harry Percival Harvey Anderson. The theory was that, by removing around 600 of the 970 British thermal units present in each pound of steam (1400 of the 2260 kilojoules in each kilogram), it would be possible to return the exhaust steam to the boiler by a pump which would consume only 1–2% of the engine's power output. Between 1925 and 1927 Anderson, and another Glasgow engineer John McCullum (some sources give McCallum), conducted experiments on a stationary steam plant with encouraging results. A company, Steam Heat Conservation (SHC), was formed and a demonstration of Anderson's system was arranged at Surbiton Electricity Generating Station.

SHC was interested in applying the system to a railway locomotive and contacted Richard Maunsell of the Southern Railway. Maunsell requested that a controlled test be carried out at Surbiton and this was done about 1929. Maunsell's technical assistant, Harold Holcroft, was present and a fuel saving of 29% was recorded, compared to conventional atmospheric working. The Southern Railway converted SECR N class locomotive number A816 (later 1816 and 31816) to the Anderson system in 1930. The locomotive underwent trials and initial results were encouraging. After an uphill trial from Eastleigh to Litchfield Summit, Holcroft is reported as saying:

"In the ordinary way this would have created much noise and clouds of steam, but with the condensing set in action it was all absorbed with the ease with which snow would melt in a furnace! The engine was as silent as an electric locomotive and the only faint noises were due to slight pounding of the rods and a small blow at a piston gland. This had to be experienced to be believed; but for the regulator being wide open and the reverser well over, one would have imagined that the second engine (an LSWR T14 class that had been provided as a back-up) was propelling the first."

The trials continued until 1934 but various problems arose, mostly with the fan for forced draught, and the project went no further. The locomotive was converted back to standard form in 1935.

=== André Chapelon ===
The work of French mechanical engineer André Chapelon in applying scientific analysis and a strive for thermal efficiency was an early example of advanced steam technology. Chapelon's protégé Livio Dante Porta continued Chapelon's work.

=== Livio Dante Porta ===
Postwar in the late 1940s and 1950s some designers worked on modernising steam locomotives. The Argentinian engineer Livio Dante Porta in the development of Stephensonian railway locomotives incorporating advanced steam technology was a precursor of the 'Modern Steam' movement from 1948. Where possible, Porta much preferred to design new locomotives, but more often in practice he was forced to radically update old ones to incorporate the new technology.

=== Bulleid and Riddles ===
In Britain the SR Leader class of c. 1949 by Oliver Bulleid and the British Rail ‘Standard’ class steam locomotives of the 1950s by Robert Riddles, particularly the BR Standard Class 9F, were used to trial new steam locomotive design features, including the Franco-Crosti boiler. On moving to Ireland, Bulleid also designed CIÉ No. CC1 which had many novel features.

== Achieving the ends ==
The Sir Biscoe Tritton Lecture, given by Roger Waller, of the DLM company to the Institute of Mechanical Engineers in 2003 gives an idea of how problems in steam power are being addressed. Waller refers mainly to some rack and pinion mountain railway locomotives that were newly built from 1992 to 1998. They were developed for three companies in Switzerland and Austria and continued to work on two of these lines as of 2008. The new steam locomotives burn the same grade of light oil as their diesel counterparts, and all demonstrate the same advantages of ready availability and reduced labour cost; at the same time, they have been shown to greatly reduce air and ground pollution. Their economic superiority has meant that they have largely replaced the diesel locomotives and railcars previously operating the line; additionally, steam locomotives are a tourist attraction.

A parallel line of development was the return to steam power of the old Lake Geneva paddle steamer Montreux that had been refitted with a diesel-electric engine in the 1960s. Economic aims similar to those achieved with the rack locomotives were pursued through automatic control of the light-oil-fired boiler and remote control of the engine from the bridge, enabling the steamship to be operated by a crew of the same size as a motor ship.

=== Carbon neutrality ===
A power unit based on advanced steam technology burning fossil fuel will inevitably emit carbon dioxide, a long-lasting greenhouse gas. However, significant reductions of other pollutants such as CO and NO_{x} are achievable by steam compared to other combustion technologies, since it does not involve explosive combustion, thus removing the need for add-ons (such as filters) or special preparation of fuel.

If renewable fuel such as wood or other biofuel is used then the system could be carbon neutral. The use of biofuel remains controversial; however, liquid biofuels are easier to manufacture for steam plant than for diesels as they do not demand the stringent fuel standards required to protect diesel injectors.

=== Advantages of advanced steam technology ===
In principle, combustion and power delivery of steam plant can be considered separate stages. High overall thermal efficiency may be difficult to achieve, largely due to the extra stage of generating a working fluid between combustion and power delivery attributable mainly to leakages and heat losses.

The separation of the processes allows specific problems to be addressed at each stage without revising the whole system every time. For instance, the boiler or steam generator can be adapted to use any heat source, whether obtained from solid, liquid or gaseous fuel, and can use waste heat. Whatever the choice, it will have no direct effect on the design of the engine unit, as that only ever has to deal with steam.

== Early twenty-first century ==
=== Small-scale stationary plant ===
This project mainly includes combined electrical generation and heating systems for private homes and small villages burning wood or bamboo chips. This is intended to replace 2-stroke donkey engines and small diesel power plants. Drastic reduction in noise level is one immediate benefit of a steam-powered small plant. Ted Pritchard, of Melbourne, Australia, was intensively developing this type of unit from 2002 until his death in 2007. The company Pritchard Power (now Uniflow Power) stated in 2010 that they continue to develop the stationary S5000, and that a prototype had been built and was being tested, and designs were being refined for market ready products.

Until 2006 a German company called Enginion was actively developing a Steamcell, a micro CHP unit about the size of a PC tower for domestic use. It seems that by 2008 it had merged with Berlin company AMOVIS.

Since 2012, a French company, EXOES, is selling to industrial firms a Rankine Cycle, patented, engine, which is designed to work with many fuels such as concentrated solar power, biomass, or fossil. The system, called "SHAPE" for Sustainable Heat And Power Engine, converts the heat into electricity. The SHAPE engine is suitable for embedded, and stationary, applications. A SHAPE engine has been integrated into a biomass boiler, and into a Concentrated solar power system. The company is planning to work with automobile manufactures, long-haul truck manufactures, and railway corporations.

A similar unit is marketed by Powertherm, a subsidiary of Spilling (see below).

A company in India manufactures steam-powered generators in a range of sizes from 4 hp to 50 hp. They also offer a number of different mills that can be powered by their engines.

In matter of technology, notice that the Quasiturbine is a uniflow rotary steam engine where steam intakes in hot areas, while exhausting in cold areas.

=== Small fixed stationary plant ===
The Spilling company produces a variety of small fixed stationary plant adapted to biomass combustion or power derived from waste heat or pressure recovery.

The Finnish company Steammotor Finland has developed a small rotary steam engine that runs with 800 kW (1,100 hp) steam generator. The engines are planned to produce electricity in wood chip fired power plants. According to the company, the steam engine named Quadrum generates 27% efficiency and runs with 180 °C (356 °F) steam at 8 bar (800 kPa; 120 psi) pressure, while a corresponding steam turbine produces just 15% efficiency, requires steam temperature of 240 °C (464 °F) and pressure of 40 bar (4,000 kPa; 580 psi). The high efficiency comes from a patented crank mechanism, that gives a smooth, pulseless torque. The company believes that by further developing the construction there is potential to reach as high efficiency as 30–35%.

=== Automotive uses ===
During the first 1970s oil crisis, a number of investigations into steam technology were initiated by large automobile corporations although as the crisis died down, impetus was soon lost.

Australian engineer Ted Pritchard's main field of research from the late 1950s until the 1970s was the building of several efficient steam power units working on the uniflow system adapted to a small truck and two cars. One of the cars was achieving the lowest emissions figures of that time.

IAV, a Berlin-based R&D company that later developed the Steamcell, during the 1990s was working on the single-cylinder ZEE (Zero Emissions Engine), followed by the compact 3-cylinder EZEE (Equal-to-Zero-Emissions-Engine) designed to fit in the engine compartment of a Škoda Fabia small family saloon. All these engines made heavy use of flameless ceramic heat cells both for the steam generator and at strategic boost points where steam was injected into the cylinder(s).

=== Rail use ===
- No. 52 8055, a rebuild of an existing locomotive (1943: built as 52 1649 (DRB); 1962: reconstruction as 52 8055 (DR), 1992: 52 8055 (EFZ - Eisenbahnfreunde Zollernbahn e.V.), 2003: rebuilt and modernized as 52 8055 NG (DLM - Dampflokomotiv- und Maschinenfabrik).
- The 5AT project, a proposal for an entirely new locomotive (Britain, 2000s).
- The ACE 3000 project, proposed by locomotive enthusiast Ross Rowland during the 1970s oil crisis. The locomotive would look like a diesel, and was designed to compete with current diesel locomotives by using coal, much cheaper than oil at the time. The ACE 3000 would feature many new technologies, such as automatic firing and water-level control. The locomotive would be able to be connected to a diesel unit and run in unison with it, so that it would not be necessary to hook up two identical locomotives. The ACE 3000 was one of the most publicised attempts at modern steam, but the project ultimately failed due to lack of funds.
- The CSR Project 130, intended to develop a modern steam locomotive (based on an existing ATSF 3460 class locomotive) capable of higher-speed passenger transport at more than 100 mph, and tested up to 130 mph (hence the name Project 130). It was proposed to be carbon-neutral, as it would have run on torrefied biomass as solid fuel (unlike all other contemporary designs, which mandate liquid fuel). The development was a joint effort between University of Minnesota's Institute on the Environment (IonE) and Sustainable Rail International, a non-profit employing railway experts and steam engineers established for the purpose. The CSR later reorganised into KVRHC, canceling the project and instead looking to cosmetically restore the locomotive.

==== Novel versus conventional layout ====
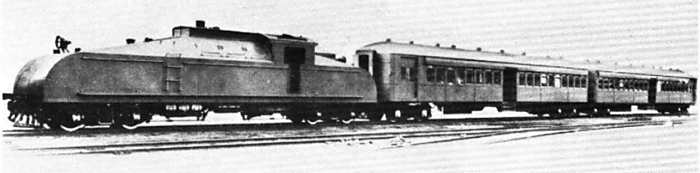
Sentinel-Cammell locomotive

A design mounted on power bogies with compact water-tube boiler similar to Sentinel designs of the 1930s. Example: Sentinel-Cammell locomotive (right).

Both 52 8055 and the proposed 5AT are of conventional layout, with the cab at the back, while the ACE 3000 had the cab located at the front. Other approaches are possible, especially with liquid fuel firing. For example:

Cab-forward type
This is a well-tried design with the potential for a large power output and would provide the driver good visibility. Being single-ended it would have to be turned on a turntable, or a triangular junction. Example: Southern Pacific 4294.
Garratt type
Another well-tried design with large power potential. Example: South Australian Railways 400 class. A future design could include shorter water tanks, and a cab at each end, to give the driver a good view in either direction.
With power bogies

==== Fireless locomotives ====
Another proposal for advanced steam technology is to revive the fireless locomotive, which runs on stored steam independently pre-generated. An example is the Solar Steam Train project in Sacramento, California.

== See also ==
- Combined gas and steam, a combined cycle in which otherwise wasted heat from a gas turbine is used to generate steam to drive a steam turbine
- List of steam technology patents
- Steam car
- Steam locomotives of the 21st century
- Steam motor
- Uniflow steam engine
