= Edward Pritchard (engineer) =

Australian mechanical engineer & inventor (1930-2007)

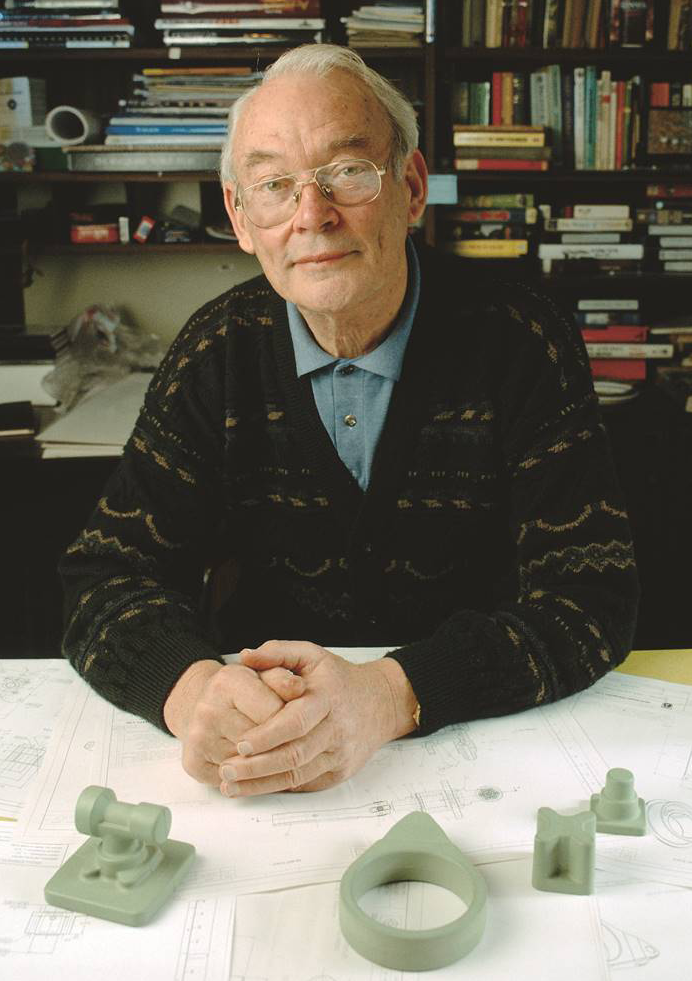
- Edward Pritchard in 2001
- Born: August 26, 1930; Melbourne, Australia
- Died: August 16, 2007 (aged 76); Kew, Victoria, Australia
- Other name: Ted Pritchard
- Education: Royal Melbourne Institute of Technology
- Occupations: Engineer, inventor
- Known for: modern steam power
- Notable work: steam powered car
- Spouse: Marion Pritchard
- Children: four

Edward "Ted" Pritchard (28 August 1930 – 16 August 2007) was an Australian mechanical engineer, inventor and developer of small scale modern steam engines. Pritchard was obsessed by the virtues of modern steam as compared to the internal combustion engine. He believed that for a fraction of the investment in the development of internal combustion engines, modern small-scale steam, externally fired engines, could prove to be of far greater efficiency and utility, exhibit better combustion characteristics, have lower emissions, greater fuel efficiency, higher torque and better power-to-weight ratios. His commitment saw him nearly single-handedly attempt to launch a steam driven car industry in Australia in the 1970s, an effort that ultimately sent him bankrupt. Towards the end of his life he continued to refine the engineering principles and designs of his engines and he left a design for what he referred to as "the best small steam engine the world has ever seen". Pritchard claimed that he had, "done for the steam engine what IBM did for the computer, made it small and personal".

== Early years ==
Edward Pritchard was born in Caulfield, Melbourne, Australia on 28 August 1930. Pritchard was 12 years old when his father explained the operation of a steam engine to him, and by 14 he had worked out an infinitely variable gear device for his bicycle. He was to remain fascinated by steam power for the rest of his life. Starting from a scholarship he entered Melbourne Technical College, going on to complete his engineering degree at Melbourne University, and graduating in mechanical and automotive engineering from the Royal Melbourne Institute of Technology.

== Stanley Steamer ==
Pritchard bought a 1923 model Stanley Steamer in 1950 and restored it with the help of his father Arnold Pritchard. The car was the basis of their early experiments in steam power, with the main modifications being in the boiler and auxiliary systems. While they worked on the Steamer, Ted was designing a new engine that was being built by his father in their Caulfield, Melbourne workshop.

== Bedford Truck ==
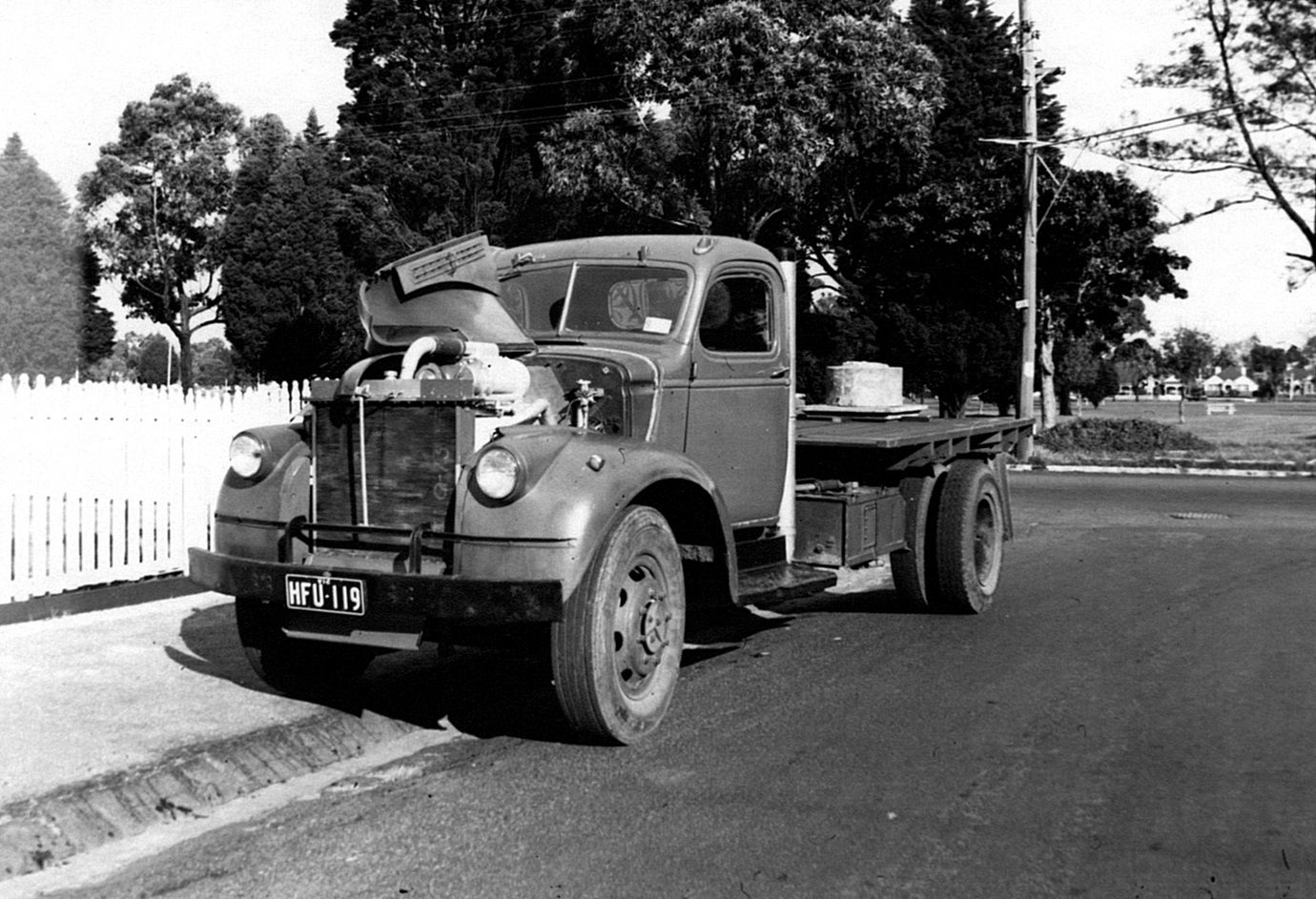
Steam-powered Bedford Truck, engine invented by Arnold and Edward Pritchard

After 10 years of design and experimentation, the father and son team had bench tested their new 90-degree V-twin double-acting uniflow type engine and installed on the tray of a 5-ton Bedford truck. This truck was subsequently partially burnt out in the Ash Wednesday bushfires in 1983 while in storage on a farm in rural Victoria. The damaged but still substantially intact truck was collected by the National Museum of Australia and has been in the Mitchell Annex of the NMA since it was acquired.

By 1963, the novel Pritchard engine had caused some interest at the engineering departments at Melbourne University and Melbourne Institute of Technology, and a group of students undertook adapting it as a sedan car power plant. Ted Pritchard quit his part-time job as a mechanical engineer to work full-time on the project with his father.

== Pritchard Ford Falcon ==
By 1967, Ted Pritchard and his father had been able to install a new, smaller Pritchard steam engine into the engine well of a 1963 Ford Falcon and run convincing road tests around the suburbs of Melbourne. Pritchard Steam Power Pty. Ltd. now had 47 shareholders, mostly friends and colleagues. In May 1968, Ted Pritchard, along with Ford Motor Company and two US companies that had also developed steam cars, gave evidence before the United States Senate Commerce Committee on Air and Water Pollution. It was at these hearings that Ted realised his engine was further advanced and more sophisticated than the current American designs. The project suffered a major setback in 1968 when Arnold Pritchard died, but a young motorcycle mechanic called Michael Edwards joined the company to continue helping Ted Pritchard with the car and engine. At this stage, the only input from the Australian government had been a $188 grant in 1969 from the Commonwealth Industrial Research and Development Board that Ted noted allowed "at least a week's further development".

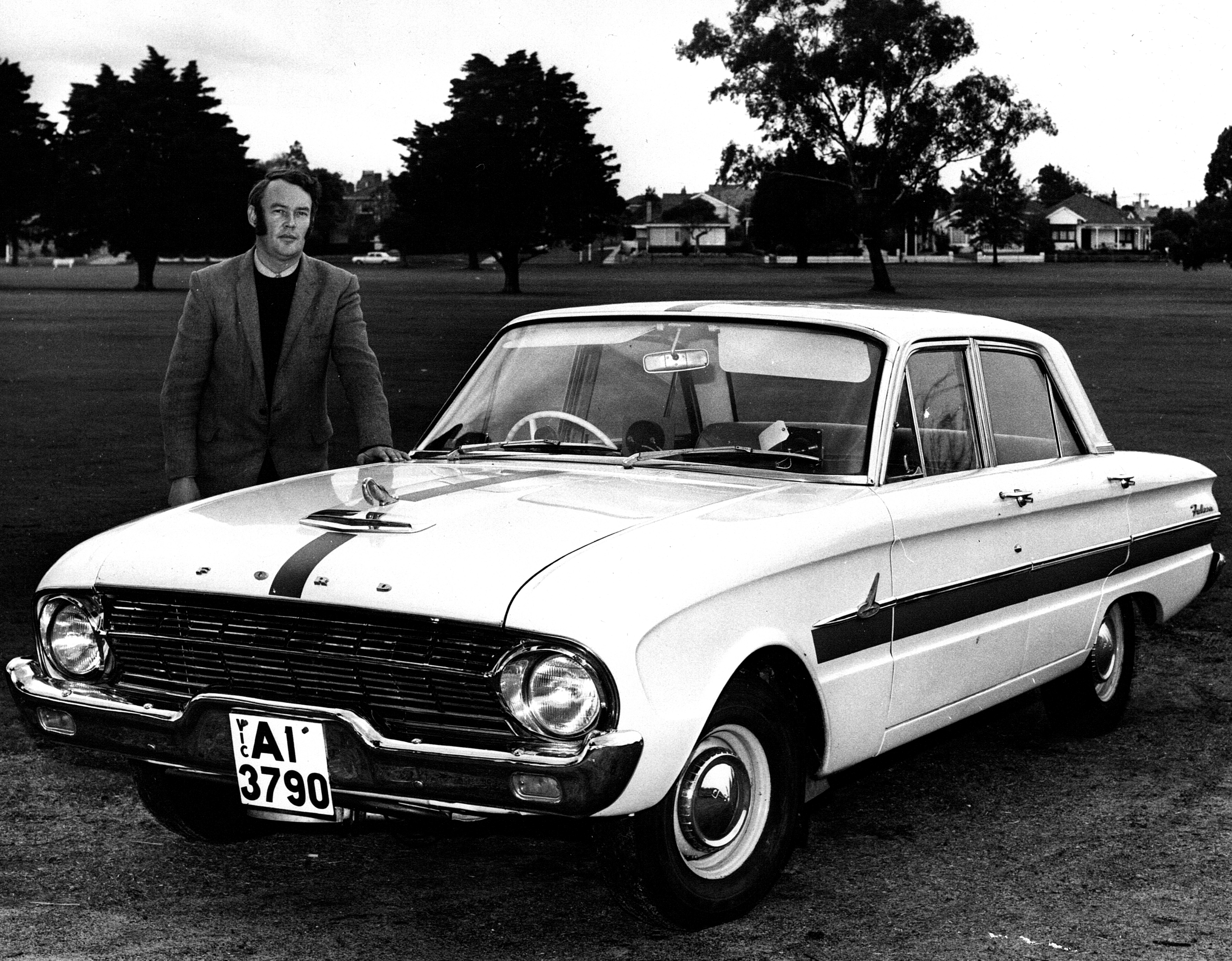
Edward (Ted) Pritchard in 1974 next to his steam-powered Ford Falcon.

After multiple minor advancements in the engine design, by 1971 the Pritchard Ford Falcon had undergone over 1,200 miles of road tests around Melbourne. In November, Richard Alexander, a consulting engineer employed by US oil and gas company Pancoastal Inc., spent 10 days performing extensive testing of the car and produced a positive report back to the company.

Encouraging emission results from the Scientific Services Department of the Gas and Fuel Corporation of Victoria were also reported. Pancoastal had already put down a $20,000 option payment for the possibility of producing the engine in the United States, and other experts from the US and Japan had visited the Caulfield workshop.

Pritchard Steam Power received a boost on 6 March 1972 when it signed contracts with Pancoastal PXP that provided an immediate $130,000 to continue development, and a third of the royalties on all engines sold. Later that month, Richard Alexander gave an extensive outline of the Pritchard Power system for Automobiles at a Public Hearing on Alternatives to the Gasoline-powered Internal Combustion Engine before the Panel on Environmental Science and Technology, United States Senate. In July of that year Edward Pritchard was awarded the Hartnett Award in recognition of his work on steam-driven automobiles by the Society of Automotive Engineers of Australasia at Australia's National Science Centre.

In November 1972, Pancoastal organised for Ted Pritchard, Michael Edwards and the Ford Falcon to fly to Thousand Oaks, near Los Angeles, USA Demonstrations were given to news media, to Representatives of State and Federal bodies interested in exhaust emissions, to motor car manufacturers including Ford, General Motors, American Motors, Leyland, Volkswagen, Mercedes-Benz, Nissan, Toyota and Alfa Romeo, and to John Deere, Aerojet Liquid Rocket, Sierra Club and the United Auto Workers Union.

In March 1973, Ted Pritchard was married to lifelong partner Marion, who was to become a central figure in Pritchard Steam Power and staunch supporter of Ted's obsession with 'modern steam'. At the end of August, the company moved to much larger premises on Canterbury Rd., Bayswater, and installed a dynamometer for testing purposes. However, further support from Pancoastal failed to materialise when they dropped the option in June, and the project again faced financial difficulties. In November 1973, Ted Pritchard drove the Ford Falcon from Melbourne to Parliament House, Canberra. While in Canberra he gave demonstration rides to eight Federal Ministers and members of parliament, including the Minister for Minerals and Energy, Mr Connor, the ACT Minister, Mr Enderby, and the Environment Minister, Dr Cass, who called for a full study of the steam car.

The Ford Falcon was publicly displayed at the Melbourne Motor Show in March 1974, with the public showing considerable interest. In May 1974, Ted took the Ford Falcon to the Ford Company's emission testing facility in Geelong on the invitation of the Society of Automotive Engineers. At first the Ford engineers were bemused by the fact that they could not detect any unburnt hydrocarbon in the tail pipe exhaust and stopped the testing to recalibrate their test rig. After further testing confirmed that the exhaust contained no unburnt hydrocarbons at the tail pipe it was declared that the car passed with "flying colours", with total emissions capable of meeting Euro 2 standards that were not introduced until 25 years later in 1999. However, at the time Eric Lange, chief engineer of Ford Australia said there was "little prospect of Ford developing the engine."

At this time, the Pritchard company already had designs for a new more advanced power unit (similar in principle to that in the Ford Falcon but promising much better performance) and a body specifically designed for the new power unit.

== The Pritchard Steam Company ==
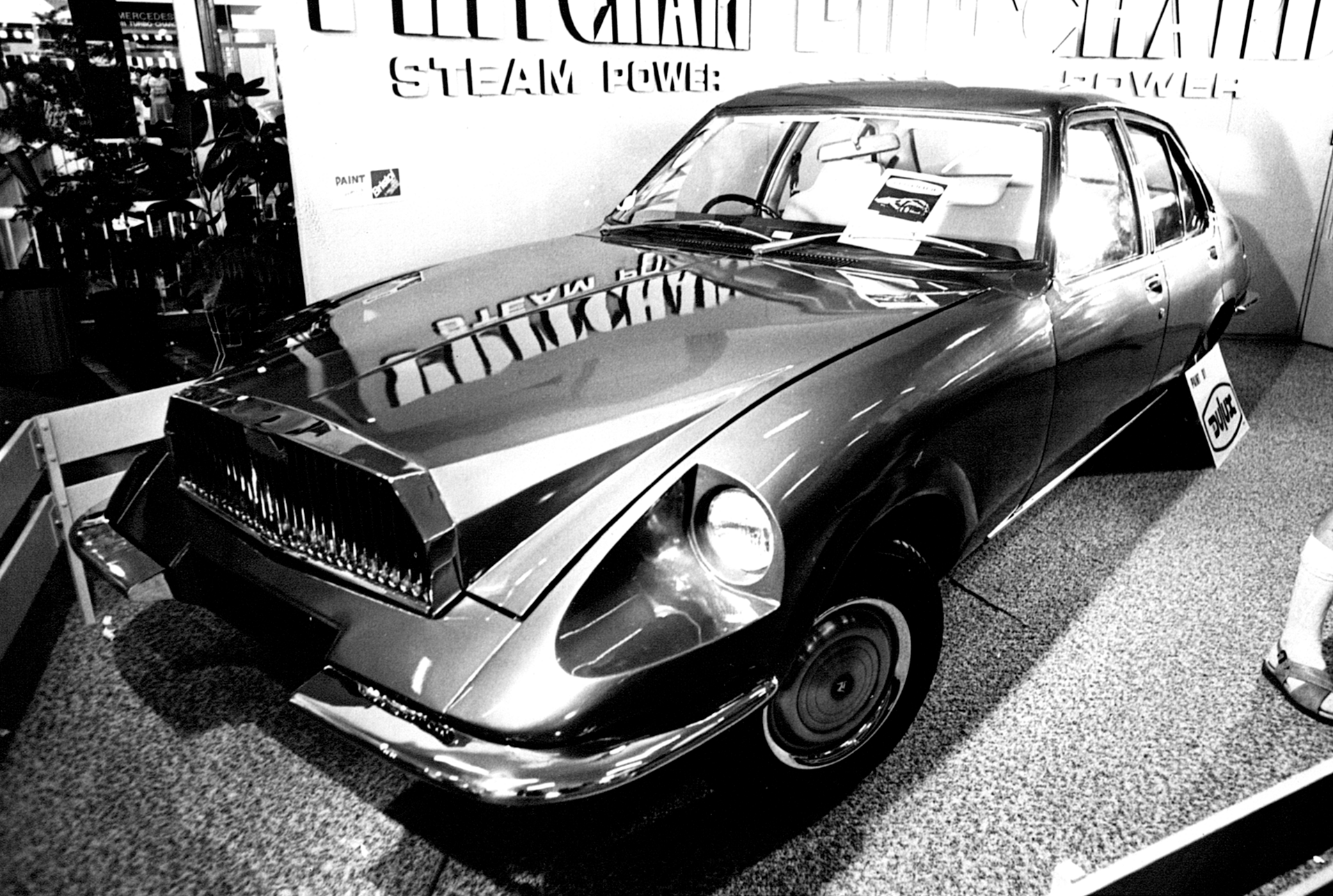
Advanced Pritchard steam-powered car displayed in March 1975 at the Melbourne International Motor Show

A sleek green scale model of the new Pritchard car design was put on public show in March 1975 at the Melbourne International Motor Show. In April, Senator James McClelland, Minister for Manufacturing Industry, announced that the Australian Government would provide funds equivalent to $250,000 for the manufacture of three prototype engines for Pritchard at its ordnance factory in Bendigo. The agreement was signed on 7 July 1975, with Pritchard Power providing the designs and testing of the manufactured power plants. However, the first of the three engines was not delivered until 18 August 1977, leaving the Pritchard company struggling for money to continue development in the interim.

While they waited for engines to be delivered, the specially designed modern Pritchard car – based on Holden Torana running gear – was being constructed in Oakleigh, Victoria. In an October interview with Mr. Pritchard he explained, "We need about $80,000 to keep going for the two years it will take to get into production… we have had some inquiries from the Russian Trade Department." In October, Ted put the original Pritchard steam truck up for sale in an effort to raise funds. He was also looking at possible funding from the USSR or the State of California, USA, for a working Pritchard steam engine. By December, the prospects were looking grim, "The money runs out next February and, when that happens, the whole thing ends."

While politicians, including the Minister for Productivity, Mr MacPhee, Federal Member for Bendigo, Mr John Bourchier, and Federal Member for Latrobe, Mr Marshall Baillieu, continued to show interest in the Pritchard steam project early in 1977, the Pritchard company was putting all their effort into being one of the 32 new cars at the March 1977 Melbourne International Motor Show, at which they collected a 7,000 person signed petition supporting the development of a steam car. A letter supporting the development had also been sent to the Federal Government by Queensland sugar cane farmers, who saw benefit in the production of alcohol to run future steam-powered cars. However, by April the company was in debt and looking at bankruptcy. On 26 April 1977 the Member for Dawson, Mr. Braithwaite, spoke in the Australian House of Representatives on saving the project. Likewise a petition by a number of eminent engineers was also presented to the Government.

In June 1977, six State MPs were taken for a ride in the Ford Falcon Pritchard car, and announced that the State Government would back Pritchard with $60,000 grant providing the Federal Government contributed $132,000 to the project. At the same time Mr Pritchard was considering a tender to the State Government of California for AU$325,000 in research funds. However, on 1 July 1977, the Commonwealth Government announced they would collaborate with the Government of Victoria and together provide a grant of AU$150,000 to the Pritchard company. The agreement between the company and the governments was signed in October 1977, and in November, with increased staff, the Pritchard company began preparing for dynamometer testing of the first engine that had been delivered from the Government's Bendigo ordnance factory in August. This step signified that the advanced V twin engine could be manufactured by a third-party, and represented a move towards large-scale production. Work on completing the car unit with controls and instruments also continued in earnest. However, Marion Pritchard noted, "The first cheque did not arrive until October and if a lady (anonymous) had not shown a great deal of faith in our project and invested some money, we would not have been here to receive the first cheque."

By April 1978, the project was running three to four months behind schedule and the additional costs were eating away at the government grant. Two technical staff employed for the testing had to be dropped. The new engine was tested on the dynamometer for the equivalent of 500 road miles producing some good results, but a major hold-up required the dismantling of the engine, the replacement of parts and its re-assembly, putting the project further behind schedule.

There were repeated domestic and international signs of interest in the engine for marine and stationary use, but there were no funds available to pursue these possibilities. "An American university, which calls the machine 'the most advanced steam device we know of,' has asked for straw-alcohol-fuelled prototypes, for testing in Third World countries. But tragically, the tiny Australian firm can't deliver. It has no funds to complete its testing program – let alone make engines for sale." The Queensland Sugar Producers Association approached the Federal Government for tax breaks in funding the company, but were rebuffed.

The government grant funds ran out in April 1979, and the Federal government refused to consider any further funding. 'According to Mrs. Pritchard "There is great pressure from vested interests."' The company attempted to become public in late 1979, but only 42,000 of the 500,000 AU$1 shares offered were taken up. In May 1980, the case of the Pritchard steam car was again taken up by a politician, this time Mr. Vince Lester from the National Party, Member for Peak Downs in Queensland. He pointed to the use of blended liquid from powdered coal and alcohol from sugar cane as two State resources that could benefit from the development of the steam car. However, in June 1980, Mr. Pritchard put his Ford Falcon and the contents of his workshop in Bayswater up for auction. The company had received interest in Pritchard steam engines from both Indonesia and Papua New Guinea, but had been unable to find investors interested in funding the projects.

In late June 1980, Vince Lester set up a cross-party public appeal with Dr Lockwood (Liberal Party, Toowoomba North) and Mr Wright (Australian Labor Party, Rockhampton) to raise money to stop the Pritchard auction. Mr Lester, who had visited Mr. Pritchard's Bayswater factory in April said, "I believe that if Pritchard is forced to sell, then the major oil companies will buy. They have no wish to allow development of a fuel alternative to petrol." By July, Queenslanders had donated $100,000 to keep the steam project alive, and a Sunshine Coast engineering firm had offered $250,000 to have the steam engine developed in Queensland. "[An] $80,000 was made available to Pritchard Steam Pty Ltd as an interest-free loan for three years to meet pressing creditors. Unfortunately, by early 1981 the results of the public appeal had gone sour, and action was taken to recover the $80,000 loan.

With no further hope of funding, and with mounting debts himself, Ted Pritchard was finally forced to close Pritchard Steam Power. Ted found work as a lecturer at RMIT teaching, among other things, the principles of mechanical engineering and the finer points of thermodynamics. This position allowed him to continue researching efficient forms of modern steam power, and to remind his students that the perfect working fluid is still water.

== The S5000 ==
In 1997, Ted Pritchard made a submission to the Inquiry into Urban Air Pollution in Australia, again promoting the low emissions possible from modern steam power plants. From 1999 to 2002 he maintained a Pritchard Power website, on which he began to publish new articles about steam power.

Now in his late 60s, Ted Pritchard declared that he would "draw one last engine before I die", and after about 6,000 hours over five years he formulated, designed and drew in pencil and ink every last nut, bolt and screw of a new Pritchard engine. This engine, known as the S5000 (steam five thousand watts), was designed to burn low-grade fuel and produce electricity, but is also able to provide steam and heat, distil water or drive any rotary mechanical device using a belt. When he finished the drawings for the S5000, Pritchard declared that he had finally done for steam engines what IBM did for computers, "made them small and personal", – reducing them in scale and increasing their power-to-weight ratio to the point where they could become commonly available and useful technology. In 2003, Pritchard Power Australia Pty Ltd (PPA) was formed exclusively to develop and license unique high efficiency, small-scale steam power systems designed by Ted Pritchard.

Ted had some of the patterns and moulds for key components of the S5000 made up, however, he never saw his final design become a reality. Ted Pritchard died at Caritas Christi Hospice in Kew, Melbourne on 16 August 2007 after a long illness. At the time the first prototype of the S5000 was being made by a Gillion Group subsidiary, MTN Tooling in Bentleigh under an agreement with a new company Ted had formed in 2006, Pritchard Power Systems Ltd. This company eventually became Uniflow Power Ltd that has proceeded to secure wide-ranging global patents over aspects of the core technology that Ted designed. Uniflow has developed the S5000 to the point that it is being demonstrated as a pre-commercial prototype known as the 'Cobber'.
