= Smoke deflectors =

Vertical plates attached to steam locomotives

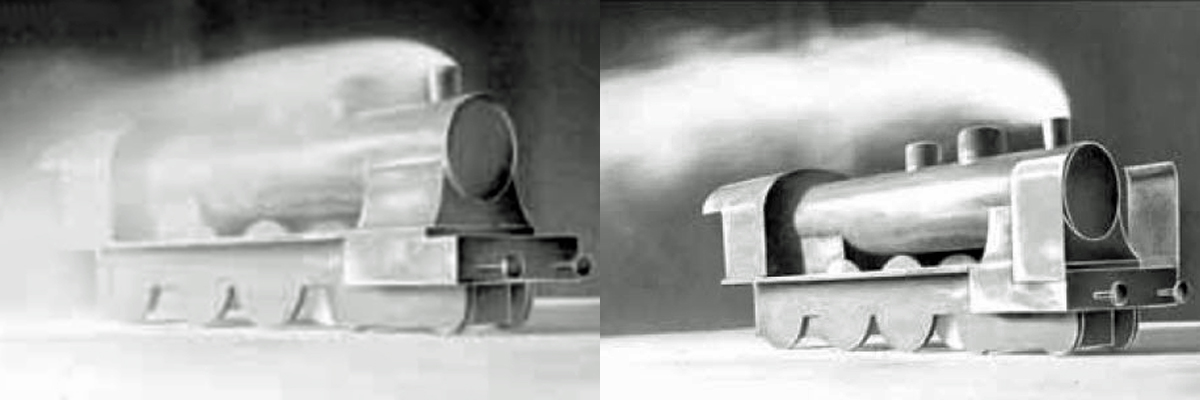
Photos of model locomotives without (left) and with (right) smoke deflectors in a wind tunnel of the Aerodynamics Research Institute in the 1920s

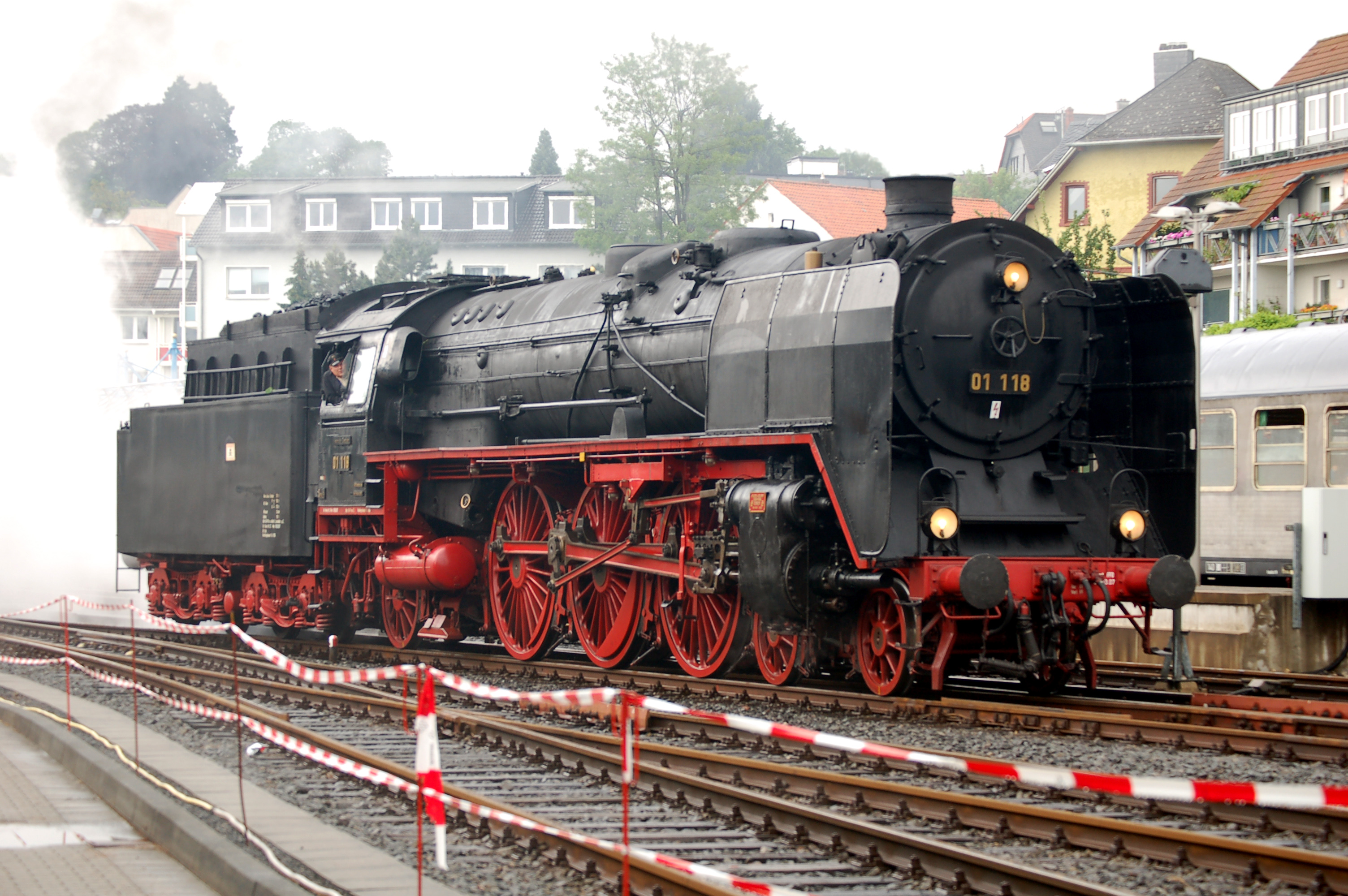
DRG Class 01 locomotive fitted with Wagner-type smoke deflectors—the large vertical plates attached to both sides of the front (right) of the locomotive

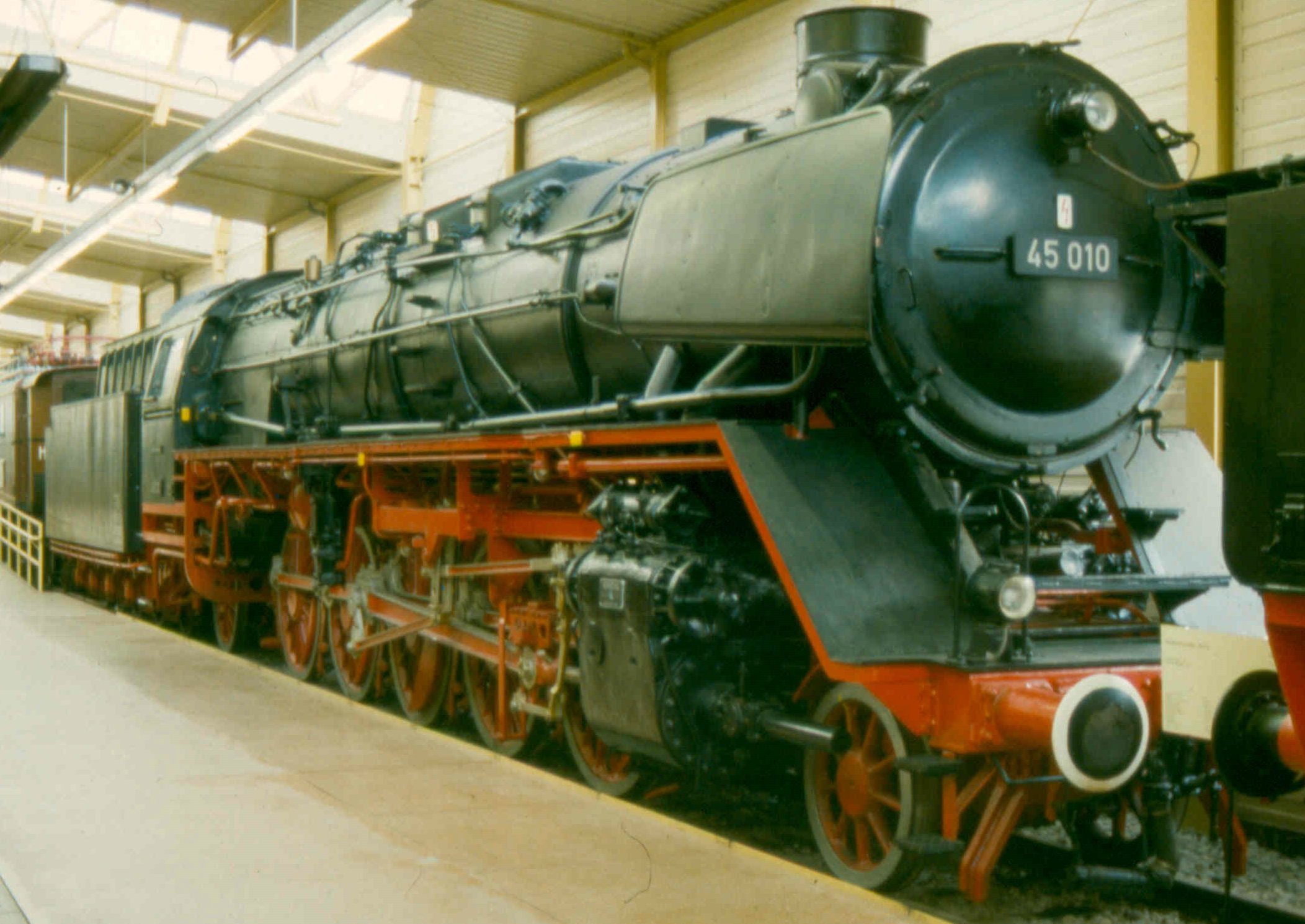
DRG Class 45 locomotive fitted with smaller Witte-type smoke deflectors

Smoke deflectors, sometimes called "blinkers" in the UK because of their strong resemblance to the blinkers used on horses, and "elephant ears" in US railway slang, are vertical plates attached to each side of the smokebox at the front of a steam locomotive. They are designed to lift smoke away from the locomotive at speed so that the driver has better visibility. On the South Australian Railways they are called "valances".

== Overview ==
Smoke deflectors became increasingly common on later steam locomotives because the velocity of the smoke exiting the chimney had been reduced as a result of efficiency gains obtained by improved smokebox design, such as the Kylchap exhaust and Giesl ejector, and as boilers became larger the size of the chimneys had to be reduced to maintain loading gauge.

== Styles ==
Various styles of smoke deflectors have been used by different railway operators. However, many are essentially a variation of one of two designs of Windleitbleche (wind guide plates) developed by the Deutsche Reichsbahn-Gesellschaft (the German State Railway Company) between the World Wars: the earlier, larger Wagner-type deflector, and the later, smaller Witte-type deflector, such as those found on the preserved LNER Gresley A3 class 4472 Flying Scotsman.

The Southern Railway in the UK was one of the first adopters and standardised on its own distinctive style where the deflectors only reached to halfway up the smokebox from the running plate. Wind tunnel testing showed that these less tall deflectors would adequately lift the smoke on the locomotives for which they were designed, without unduly detracting from the appearance.

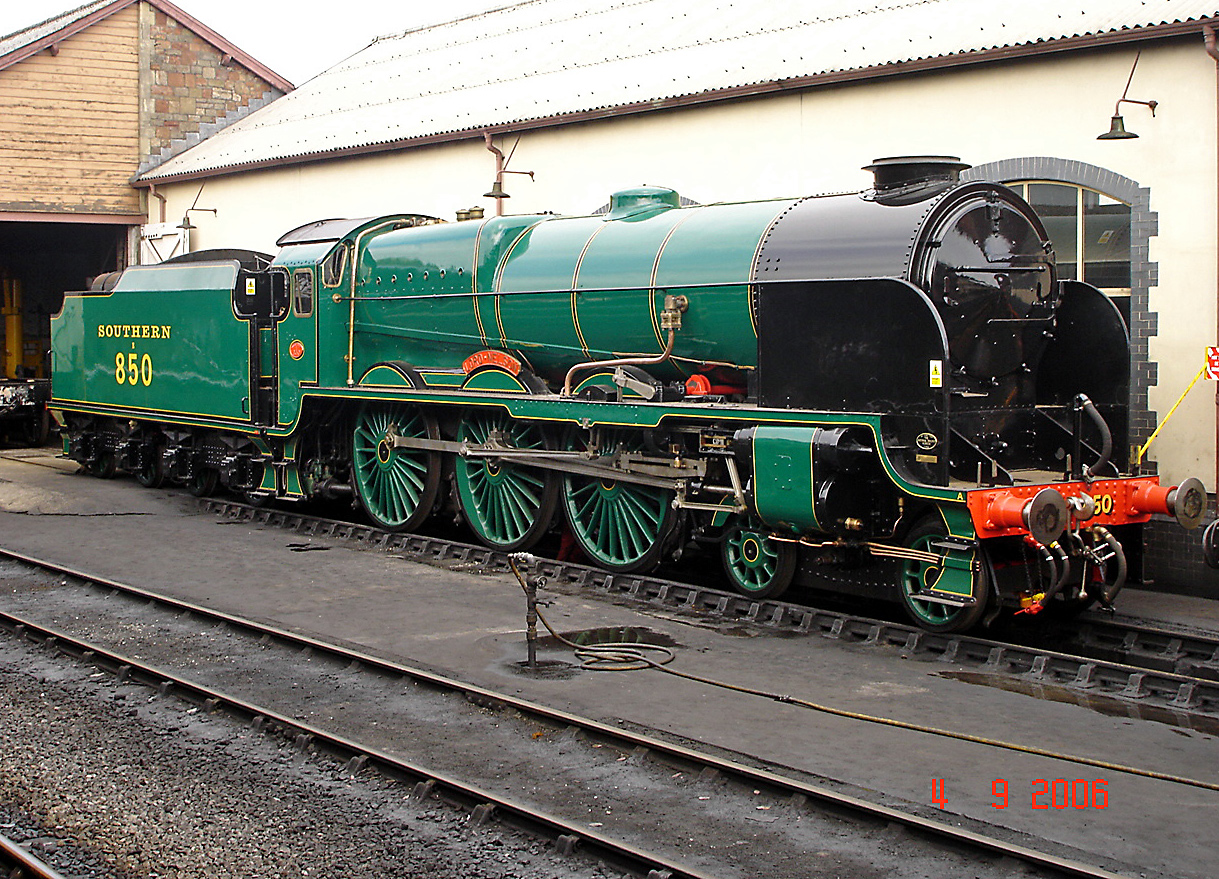
SR Lord Nelson class with short SR standard deflectors
