= Steam locomotive exhaust system =

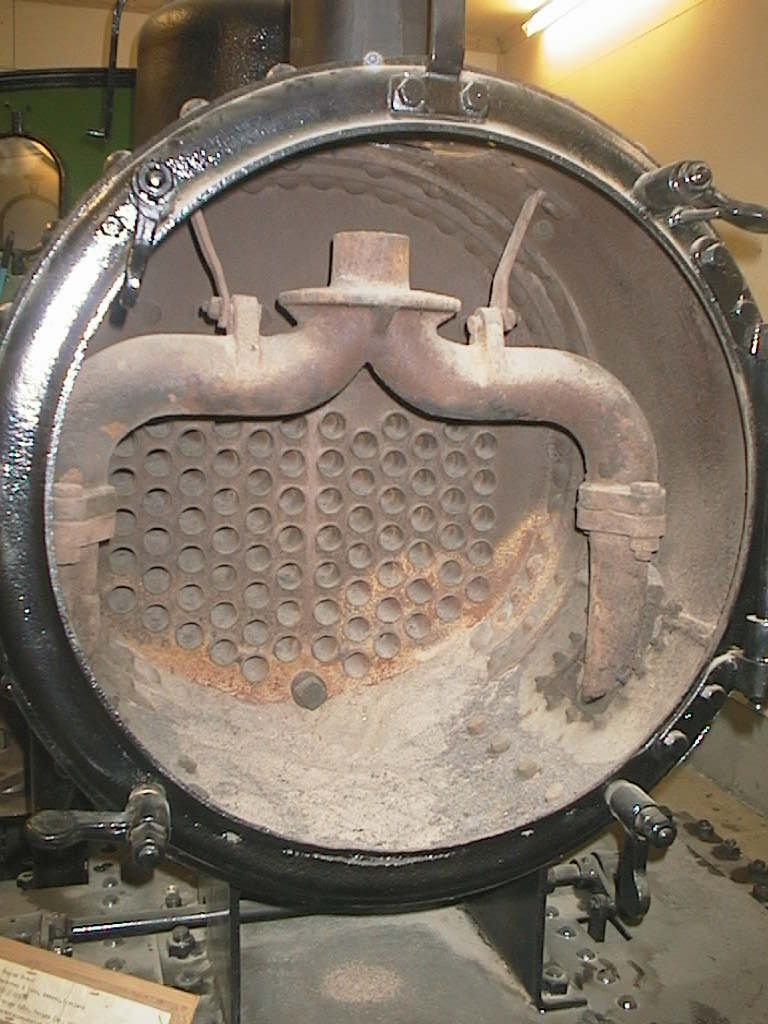
Simple blastpipe arrangement

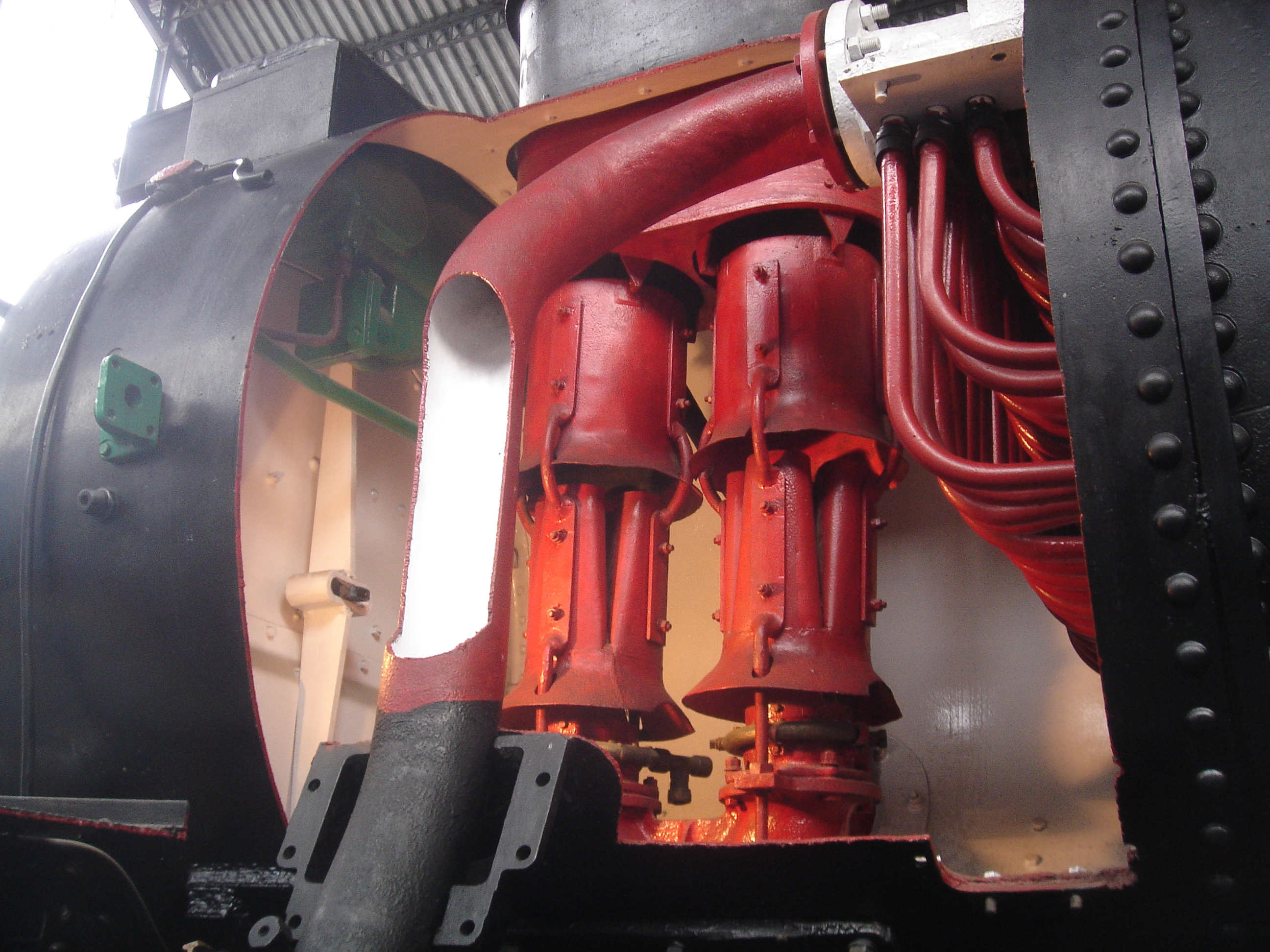
Later double chimney, with Kylchap blastpipes

The steam locomotive exhaust system consists of those parts of a steam locomotive which together discharge exhaust steam from the cylinders in order to increase the draught through the fire. It usually consists of the blastpipe (or first stage nozzle), smokebox, and chimney, although later designs also include second and third stage nozzles.

== History ==
The first use of directing exhaust steam up the chimney to provide draft through the fire is somewhat controversial, Ahrons (1927) devoting significant attention to this matter. The cylinder exhaust on the first steam locomotive – built by Richard Trevithick – was directed up the chimney, and he noted its effect on increasing the draft through the fire at the time. At Wylam Timothy Hackworth also employed a blastpipe on his earliest locomotives, but it is not clear if this was an independent discovery or a copy of Trevithick's design. Shortly after Hackworth, George Stephenson also employed the same method but it is also uncertain whether it was his discovery or copying other engineers.

Locomotives at the time employed either a single flue boiler or a single return flue, with the fire grate at one end of the flue. For these boilers a blastpipe was too strong, disturbing the fire and sending unburned fuel up the chimney. It was not until the development of multi-tube boilers that the centrally positioned, contracted orifice blastpipe became standard. The combination of multi-tube boiler and steam blast are often cited as the principal reasons for Stephenson's Rocket success at the 1829 Rainhill trials.

== Description ==
Soon after blastpipes were introduced it became apparent that a smokebox was needed beneath the chimney to provide space for the exhaust smoke from the firebox could mix with the steam. This also made it easier to collect ash sucked through the fire tubes by the draught. The blastpipe was mounted at the bottom of the smokebox directly beneath the chimney.

The steam blast is largely self-regulating: an increase in the rate of steam consumption by the cylinders increases the blast, which increases the draught and hence the temperature of the fire.

Modern locomotives are also fitted with a blower, a device that releases steam directly into the smokebox when a greater draught is needed without increasing the rate of steam passing through the cylinders. This is used when the regulator is closed suddenly or the train passes through a tunnel. If a single line tunnel is poorly ventilated, a locomotive entering at high speed can rapidly compress the air within it, which may enter the chimney with substantial force. This can blast fire into the cab if the firebox door is open at the time. A blower can be used to counteract the compression effect.

== Later development ==
Exhaust systems were continually developed to obtain the maximum smokebox vacuum with minimum back pressure on the pistons.

Smokebox designs remained relatively basic until 1908, when the first comprehensive examination of steam-raising performance was carried out by W.F.M. Goss of Purdue University. These principles were adopted by George Jackson Churchward of the Great Western Railway and later furthor by Samuel Ell in the 1950s using the GWR stationary testing plant under British Railways. Ell was able to double the maximum steaming rate of the GWR Manor Class with seemingly minor changes to the front end design, and more than doubled the rate for an LNER V2.

Andre Chapelon made significant improvement with his Kylchap exhaust which incorporated a Kylälä spreader (second stage nozzle) and third stage cowl between the blastpipe (first stage nozzle) and chimney. This became popular near the end of steam in the early-to-mid 20th century and was used on Sir Nigel Gresley's No. 4468 Mallard, the fastest officially measured steam locomotive. Other contemporary designs include the Giesl and Lemaître exhausts which have the same effect by different means.

Further development was carried on by Chapelon's friend Livio Dante Porta, who developed the Kylpor, Lempor and Lemprex exhausts systems. He also developed complex mathematical models to optimise their use for specific locomotives. With the end of commercial steam on mainline railways worldwide there has been little funding to further develop steam locomotive technology, despite advances in materials science and computer modelling techniques which might have aided further improvements.
