= Sir Bedivere =

Sir Bedivere may refer to:

- Bedivere, a Knight of the Round Table, who returns Excalibur to the Lady of the Lake
- RFA Sir Bedivere (L3004), a Landing Ship Logistic of the Round Table class
- SR 457 Sir Bevidere, a Southern Railway passenger express locomotive of the King Arthur class
