= South African Class NG G16A 2-6-2+2-6-2 =

1989 articulated narrow-gauge steam locomotive

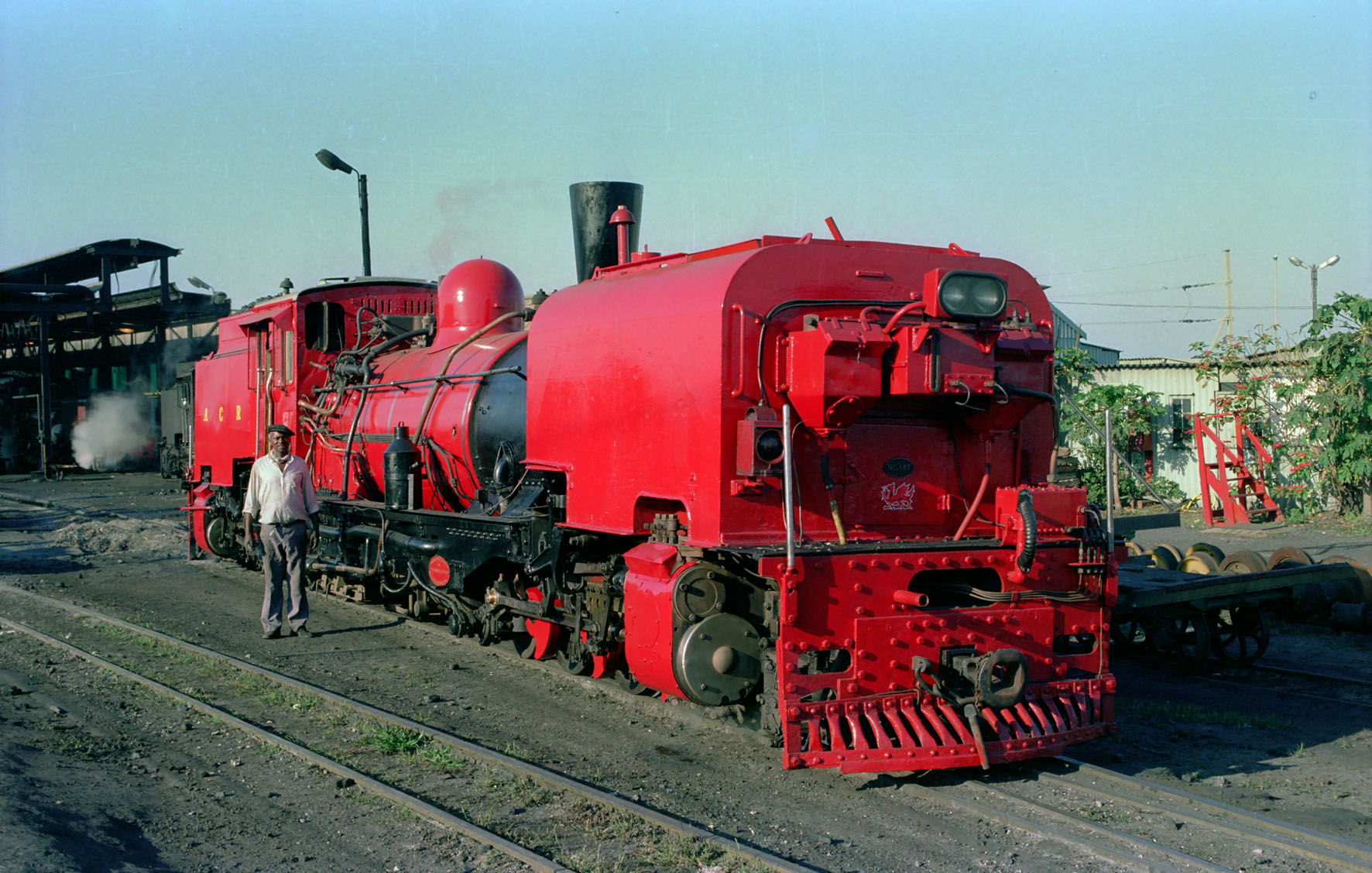
- Red Dragon no. 141 at Port Shepstone, May 1990
Type and origin
- ♥ No. NG141 – ♠ No. NG155
- Power type: Steam
- Designer: Alfred County Railway (Phil Girdlestone)
- Builder: Alfred County Railway
- Serial number: BP 7866, Hunslet-Taylor 3900
- Model: Class NG G16A
- Build date: 1989–1990
- Total produced: 2
Specifications
- Configuration
  - Whyte: 2-6-2+2-6-2 (Double Prairie)
  - UIC: 1'C1'+1'C1'h4t
- Driver: 3rd & 4th coupled axles
- Gauge: 2 ft (610 mm) narrow
- Leading dia.: 21 in (533 mm)
- Coupled dia.: 33 in (838 mm)
- Trailing dia.: 21 in (533 mm)
- Minimum curve: 160 ft (49 m)
- Wheelbase: 43 ft 3 in (13,183 mm)
  - Engine: 13 ft 10 1/2 in (4,229 mm) each
  - Coupled: 6 ft 3 in (1,905 mm) each
- Pivot centres: 23 ft 9 in (7,239 mm)
- Length
  - Over couplers: 48 ft 5 1/4 in (14,764 mm)
- Width: 7 ft (2,134 mm)
- Height: 10 ft 4 in (3,150 mm)
- Frame type: Bar
- Axle load: ♥ 6 LT 17 cwt 3 qtr (6,998 kg) ♠ 6 LT 18 cwt (7,011 kg)
  - Leading: ♥ 6 LT 7 cwt 2 qtr (6,477 kg) front 6 LT 7 cwt 1 qtr (6,465 kg) rear ♠ 6 LT 10 cwt (6,604 kg) front 5 LT 14 cwt (5,791 kg) rear
  - 1st coupled: ♥ 6 LT 14 cwt 3 qtr (6,846 kg) ♠ 6 LT 18 cwt (7,011 kg)
  - 2nd coupled: ♥ 6 LT 17 cwt 3 qtr (6,998 kg) ♠ 6 LT 6 cwt (6,401 kg)
  - 3rd coupled: ♥ 6 LT 15 cwt (6,858 kg) ♠ 6 LT 4 cwt (6,299 kg)
  - 4th coupled: ♥ 6 LT 14 cwt 2 qtr (6,833 kg) ♠ 6 LT 15 cwt (6,858 kg)
  - 5th coupled: ♥ 6 LT 14 cwt (6,808 kg) ♠ 6 LT 17 cwt (6,960 kg)
  - 6th coupled: ♥ 6 LT 14 cwt 3 qtr (6,846 kg) ♠ 6 LT 1 cwt (6,147 kg)
  - Trailing: ♥ 4 LT 1 cwt 1 qtr (4,128 kg) front 3 LT 10 cwt (3,556 kg) rear ♠ 3 LT 14 cwt (3,759 kg) front 3 LT 19 cwt (4,013 kg) rear
- Adhesive weight: ♥ 40 LT 10 cwt 3 qtr (41,190 kg) ♠ 39 LT 1 cwt (39,680 kg)
- Loco weight: ♥ 61 LT 5 cwt 2 qtr (62,260 kg) ♠ 59 LT 2 cwt (60,050 kg)
- Fuel type: Coal
- Fuel capacity: ♥ 6 LT 4 cwt (6.3 t) ♠ 4 LT (4.1 t)
- Water cap.: ♥ 1,325 imp gal (6,020 L) front ♠ 1,325 imp gal (6,020 L) front 540 imp gal (2,450 L) rear
- Firebox
  - Type: Round-top
  - Grate area: 19.5 sq ft (1.81 m^{2})
- Boiler
  - Pitch: 5 ft 5 in (1,651 mm)
  - Diameter: 4 ft 7 3/4 in (1,416 mm)
  - Tube plates: 9 ft 3 5/8 in (2,835 mm)
  - Small tubes: 152: 1 3/4 in (44 mm)
  - Large tubes: 15: 5 1/2 in (140 mm)
- Boiler pressure: 180 psi (1,241 kPa)
- Safety valve: Ross-pop
- Heating surface
  - Firebox: 6.97 m^{2} (75.0 sq ft)
  - Tubes: 60.24 m^{2} (648.4 sq ft)
  - Flues: 18.7 m^{2} (201 sq ft)
  - Total surface: 85.91 m^{2} (924.7 sq ft)
- Superheater
  - Type: 15 elements
  - Heating area: 14.9 m^{2} (160 sq ft)
- Cylinders: Four
- Cylinder size: 12 in (305 mm) bore 16 in (406 mm) stroke
- Valve gear: Walschaerts
- Valve type: 140 mm (5.5 in) Piston
- Valve travel: 90 mm (3.5 in)
- Valve lap: 22.22 mm (0.9 in) steam lap 1 mm (0.0 in) exhaust lap
- Valve lead: 3.5 mm (0.1 in)
- Couplers: Johnston link-and-pin
Performance figures
- Tractive effort: 95 kN (21,000 lbf) @ 75%
Career
- Operators: Alfred County Railway
- Class: Class NG G16A
- Number in class: 2
- Numbers: 141, 155
- Nicknames: Red Dragon
- Delivered: 1989–1990
- First run: 1989

The Alfred County Railway Class NG G16A 2-6-2+2-6-2 of 1989 is a steam locomotive from the South African Railways era.

Between 1937 and 1968 the South African Railways placed 34 Class NG G16 2-6-2+2-6-2 Garratt articulated steam locomotives in service. In 1989 and 1990 two of these locomotives were rebuilt to Class NG G16A by the Alfred County Railway.

== Manufacturers ==
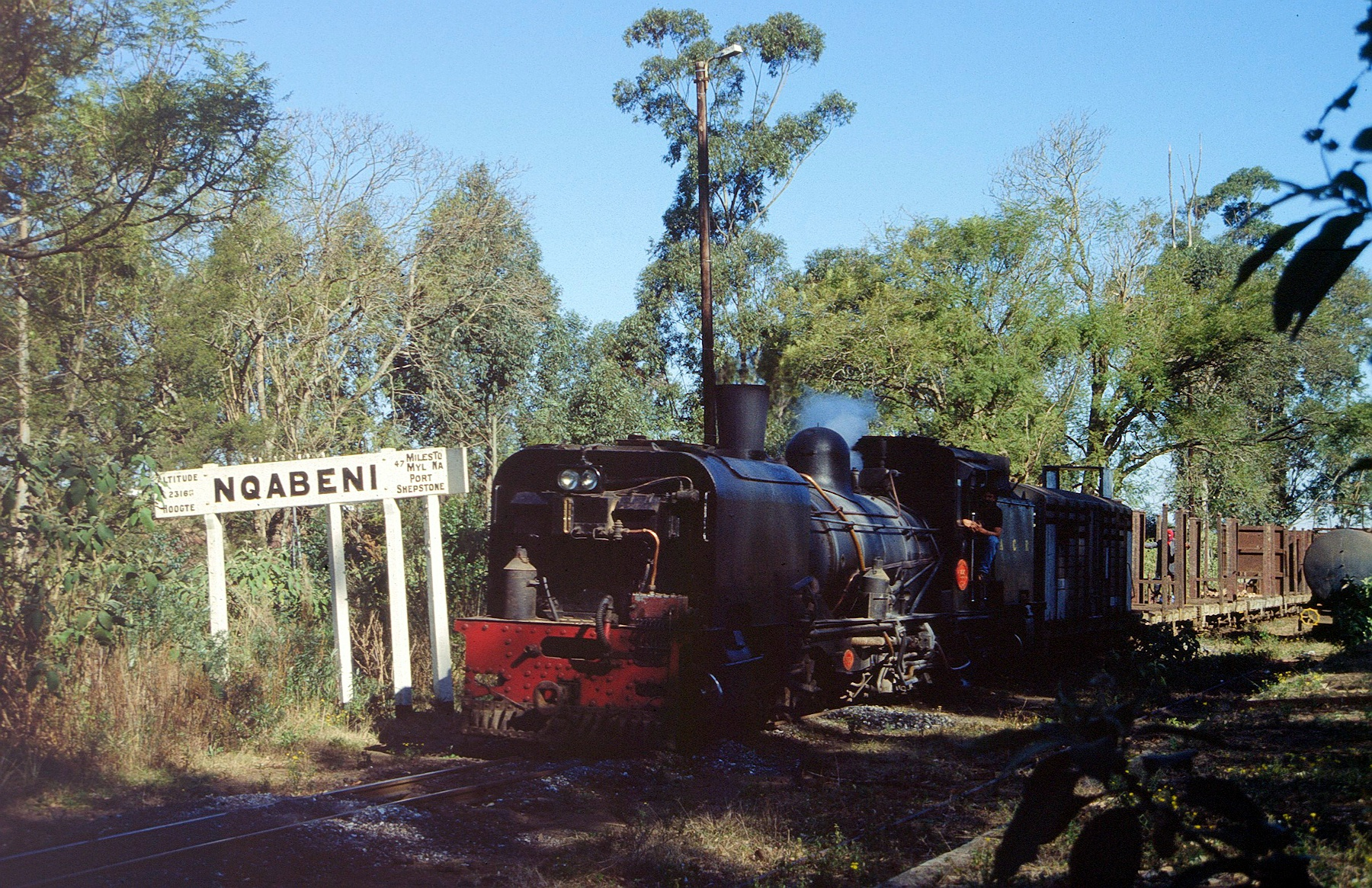
No. 155 shunting at Nqabeni, c. 1991

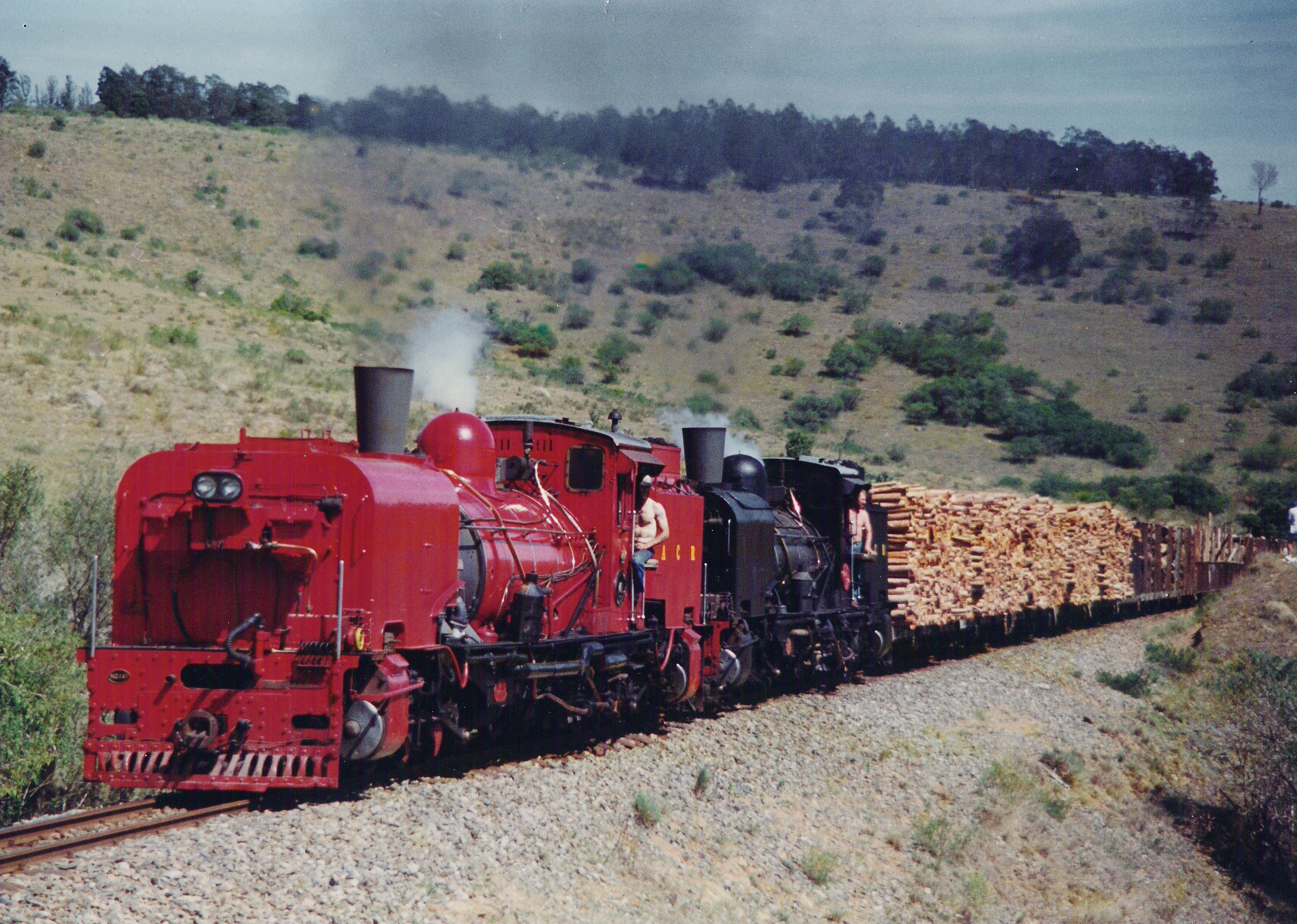
No's 141 & 155 climbing from Bongwana to Nqabeni, c. 1992

A total of 34 Class NG G16 2-6-2+2-6-2 locomotives were built for the South African Railways (SAR) between 1937 and 1968. Four were delivered by Société Anonyme John Cockerill of Seraing in Belgium in 1937, twenty-two by Beyer, Peacock & Company between 1939 and 1958, and the last eight by Hunslet-Taylor in Germiston, Transvaal in 1967 and 1968.

The locomotives were superheated, with a superheater area of 14.9 square metres (160 square feet) and fifteen elements of 38 millimetres (1.5 inches) outside diameter and a 31 millimetres (1.2 inches) bore.

== Alfred County Railway ==
When the four narrow gauge branchline systems in Natal were closed down by the SAR, the Weenen and Mid-Illovo lines were torn up. The Harding line was privatised in 1988 as the Alfred County Railway (ACR), operating out of Port Shepstone. The ACR was also known as the Banana Express from the tourism part of its operation.

== Class NG G16A rebuilding ==
As part of the ACR's strategy to keep the narrow gauge railway competitive, two of its Class NG G16 Garratt locomotives were rebuilt using technology similar to that used by mechanical engineer David Wardale in the creation of the Class 26 Red Devil in 1980, based on developments pioneered by Argentinian engineer L.D. Porta. The Class NG G16 rebuilding incorporated a gas producing combustion system (GPCS), Lempor exhausts, an improved spark arrester, lightweight multi-ring articulated piston valves, improved valve events and improved mechanical lubrication.

The rebuilding was done by mechanical engineer Phil Girdlestone, who was employed as Chief Mechanical Engineer of the ACR primarily for this purpose. The work was carried out at Port Shepstone. The first locomotive to undergo the treatment was the Beyer, Peacock-built no. 141 in 1989.

The modifications were similar in scope to that of the Red Devil, although not as extensive. Like the Class 26, no. 141 was also painted red and nicknamed the Red Dragon. Welsh Dragon emblems were later mounted on the cab sides and bunker ends.

The second locomotive, the Hunslet-Taylor-built no. 155, was rebuilt in 1990, but it retained its traditional ex-SAR black livery. Both modified locomotives were reclassified to Class NG G16A.

=== Gas producing combustion system ===
The GPCS is a single-stage gas producer which achieves an improved combustion and steaming rate, reduces the emission of black smoke and overcomes the problem of clinkering. The most serious waste of fuel in a conventional steam locomotive is the loss of unburned coal particles from the fuel bed through the exhaust because of the rapid flow of air through the grate.

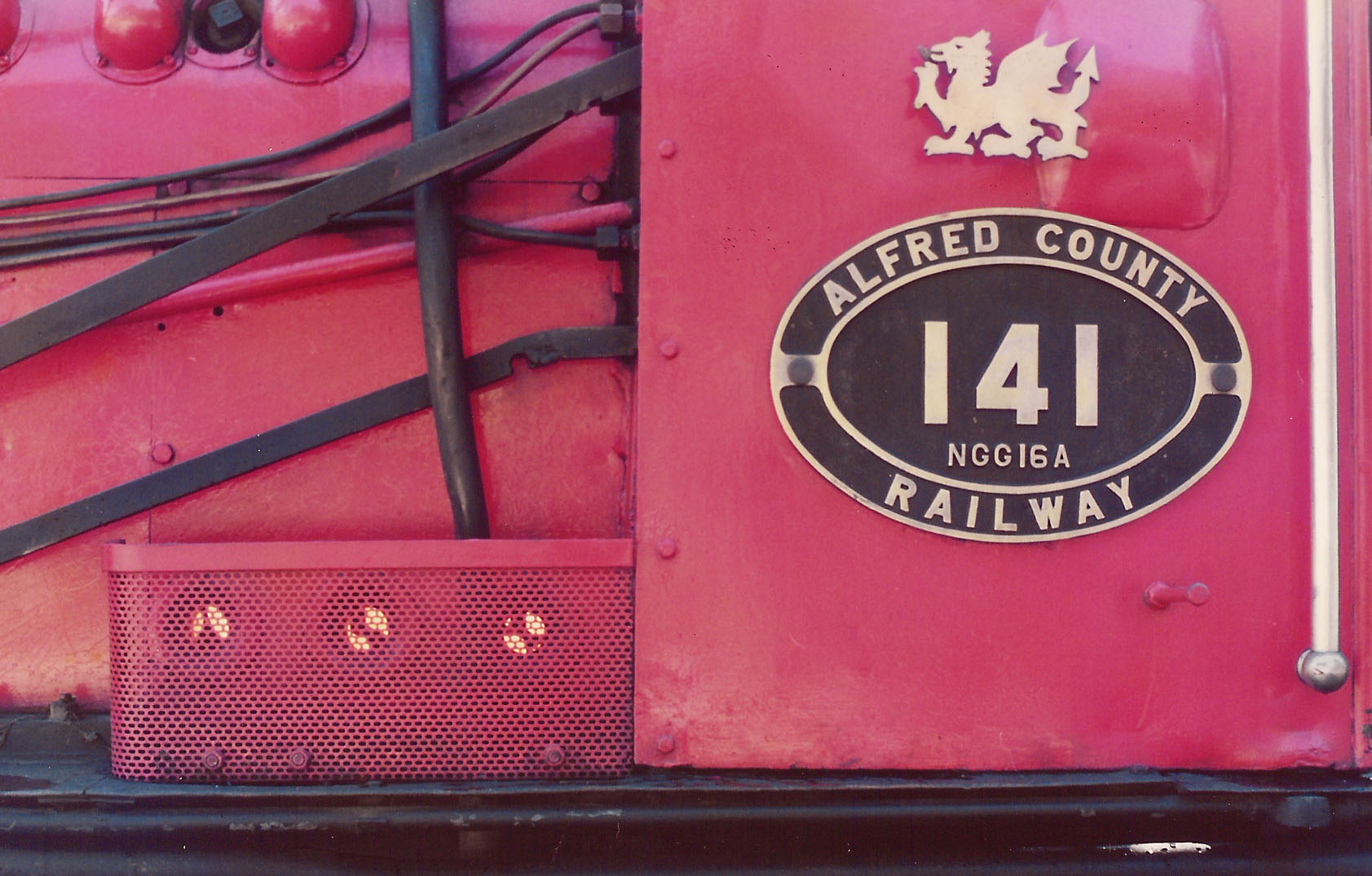
Secondary air inlets with swirl inducers and a spark arresting plate

The GPCS relies on the gasification of coal on a low temperature firebed so that the gases are then fully burnt above the firebed. To achieve this, the amount of air being drawn up through the firebed is minimised, while the main sources of air required for combustion is through secondary air inlets located in the firebox sides and through the vertically sliding firedoor. The air inlets contain swirl inducers to spread the incoming air inside the firebox.

With the GPCS, the coal is heated to drive off the volatile components which are then burned in the secondary air admitted above the grate. The result is improved combustion, thereby minimising black smoke, which is evidence of incomplete combustion and unburnt coal particles being ejected through the exhaust. Note the clear exhausts in the picture below of numbers 141 and 155 double-heading on the climb from Bongwana to Nqabeni.

=== Lempor exhaust ===
One visible difference between the original and the rebuilt locomotives is the megaphone-shaped Lempor chimney, which contains a cylindrical mixing chamber and a wide angled diffuser. The object of the latter is to convert the kinetic energy of the combustion gas and exhaust steam mixture to a pressure as close to atmospheric as possible.

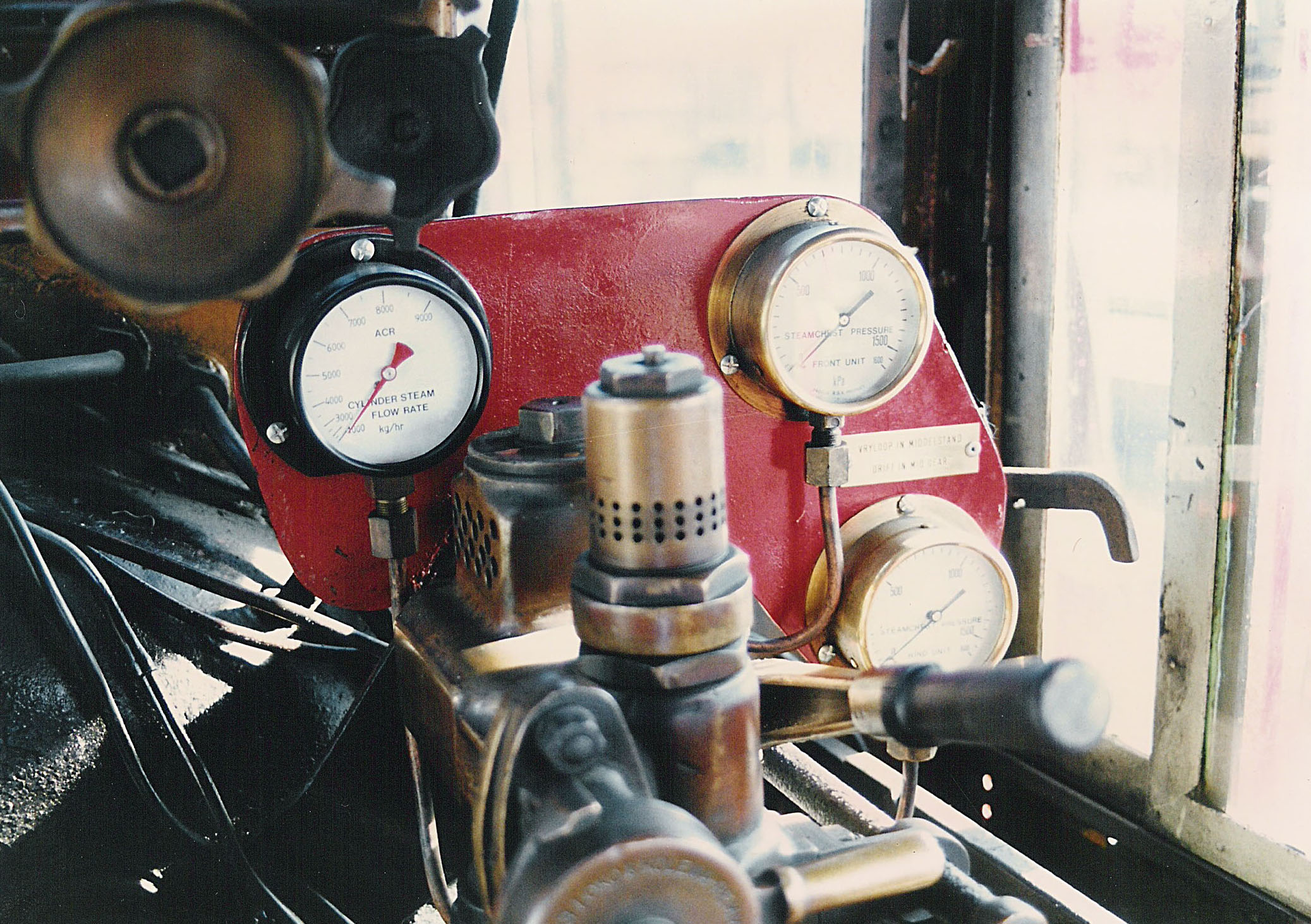
Steamchest pressure gauges and cylinder steam flow gauge in no. 141

Ejector pump efficiency depends on the length-to-diameter ratio of the exhaust chimney. Although less obvious, both Wardale GPCS locomotives, Class 19D no. 2644 and Class 26 no. 3450, have exactly this shape of chimney, but because of height constraints in large locomotives, their chimneys had to be doubled or even tripled to achieve the correct proportions, hence the double exhausts of the two Wardale locomotives. Narrow gauge locomotives like the Class NG G16, on the other hand, have plenty of height available for the exhaust, so a single long chimney was achievable.

Other visible differences are larger mechanical lubricators and external drive from the valve spindle, a vacuum ejector exhaust muffler just in front of the safety valves, pipes conveying exhaust and ejector steam to the ashpan for mixing with the primary air, the secondary air inlets in the firebox sides with spark arresting plates outside them, and the snifting and bypass valves which were removed and blanked off since the modified locomotive drifted in mid-gear with steam supplied from the drifting valve.

=== Performance ===
In comparative testing, no. 141 achieved a fuel saving of 25% compared to a standard Class NG G16 Garratt, a performance which was easily maintained in regular service. Power outputs of over 700 indicated horsepower was achieved and the locomotive was probably capable of achieving a maximum of 800 indicated horsepower, some 25% more than the Class 91-000 narrow gauge diesel-electric locomotive. The improvement in performance and economy of the locomotive was brought about by the higher grate limit by means of the GPCS and better flow past the improved valves, valve motion and exhaust. Other basic elements of the locomotive remained more or less the same.

The cost of the work paid off financially within twelve months and led to a proposal to develop a Class NG G17 Garratt. That proposal, however, never became reality since the line's farming produce traffic was gradually lost to road transport on the improving road network, a decline which eventually led to the ACR's demise.

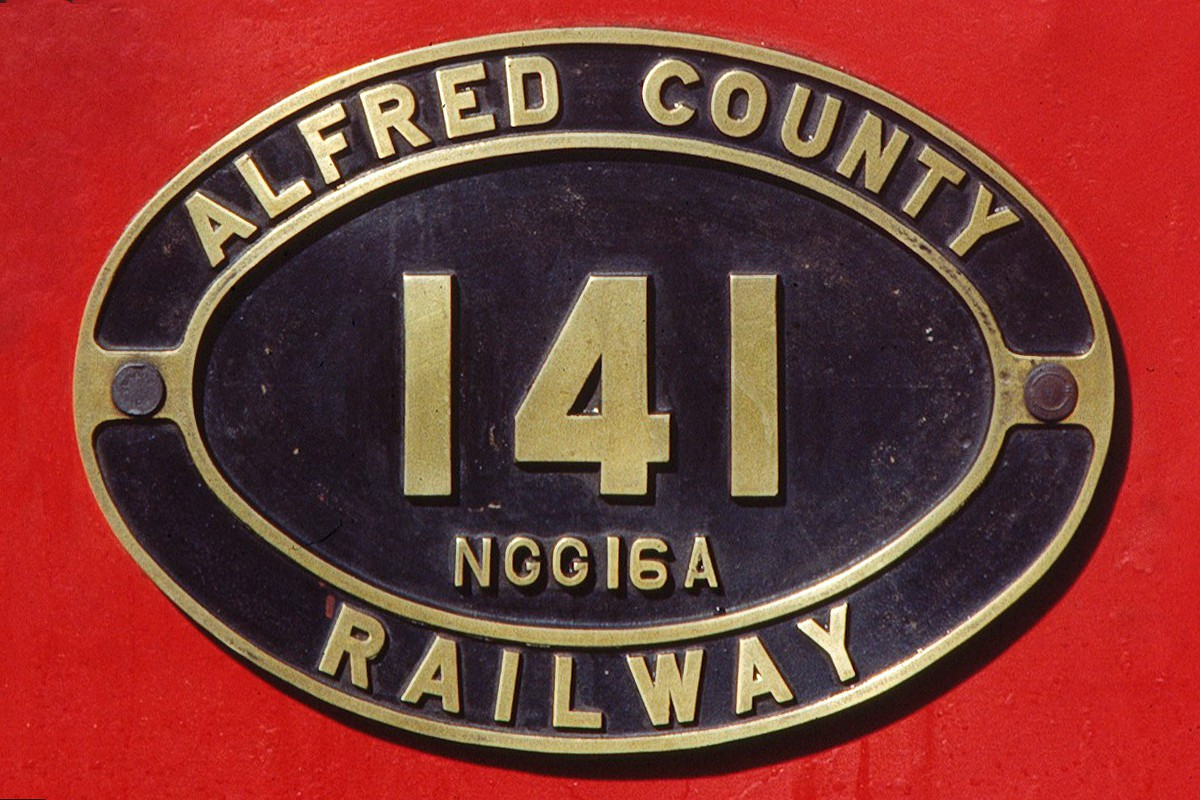
NGG16A numberplate
