= Sir Ironside =

Sir Ironside may refer to:

- The Red Knight in the story of Gareth, a character in Arthurian legend
- A King Arthur class locomotive
