= Blastpipe =

Component of a steam locomotive's exhaust system

The blastpipe is part of the exhaust system of a steam locomotive that discharges exhaust steam from the cylinders into the smokebox beneath the chimney in order to increase the draught through the fire.

== History ==
Diagram of a locomotive blast pipe. The Blast Pipe (a) directs exhaust steam into the smokebox (b). The steam entrains the smoke from the firebox (c), creating more draft which helps speed the smoke out the chimney (d).

The primacy of discovery of the effect of directing the exhaust steam up the chimney as a means of providing draft through the fire is the matter of some controversy, Ahrons (1927) devoting significant attention to this matter. The exhaust from the cylinders on the first steam locomotive – built by Richard Trevithick – was directed up the chimney, and he noted its effect on increasing the draft through the fire at the time. At Wylam, Timothy Hackworth also employed a blastpipe on his earliest locomotives, but it is not clear whether this was an independent discovery or a copy of Trevithick's design. Shortly after Hackworth, George Stephenson also employed the same method, and again it is not clear whether that was an independent discovery or a copy of one of the other engineers. Goldsworthy Gurney was another early exponent, whose claim to primacy was energetically advocated by his daughter Anna Jane.

The locomotives at the time employed either a single flue boiler or a single return flue, with the fire grate at one end of the flue. Because a single flue had to be wide to let the exhaust through, a blastpipe could lift the fire, pulling soot and sparks up the chimney. It was not until the development of the multitubular boiler that a forced draft could be used safely and effectively. The combination of multi-tube boiler and steam blast are often cited as the principal reasons for the high performance of Rocket of 1829 at the Rainhill Trials.

== Description ==
Soon after the power of the steam blast was discovered it became apparent that a smokebox was needed beneath the chimney, to provide a space in which the exhaust gases emerging from the boiler tubes can mix with the steam. This had the added advantage of allowing access to collect the ash drawn through the fire tubes by the draught. The blastpipe, from which steam is emitted, was mounted directly beneath the chimney at the bottom of the smokebox.

The steam blast is largely self-regulating: an increase in the rate of steam consumption by the cylinders increases the blast, which increases the draught and hence the temperature of the fire. Modern locomotives are also fitted with a blower, which is a device that releases steam directly into the smokebox for use when a greater draught is needed without a greater volume of steam passing through the cylinders. An example of such situation is when the regulator is closed suddenly, or the train passes through a tunnel. If a single line tunnel is poorly ventilated, a locomotive entering at high speed can cause a rapid compression of the air within the tunnel. This compressed air may enter the chimney with substantial force. This can be extremely dangerous if the firebox door is open at the time. For this reason the blower is often turned on in these situations, to counteract the compression effect.

== Later development ==
Little development of the basic principles of smokebox design took place until 1908, when the first comprehensive examination of steam-raising performance was carried out by W.F.M. Goss of Purdue University. These principles were adopted on the Great Western Railway by George Jackson Churchward. A later development was the so-called jumper-top blastpipe which controlled the area of the blastpipe at different steaming rates to maximise efficiency.

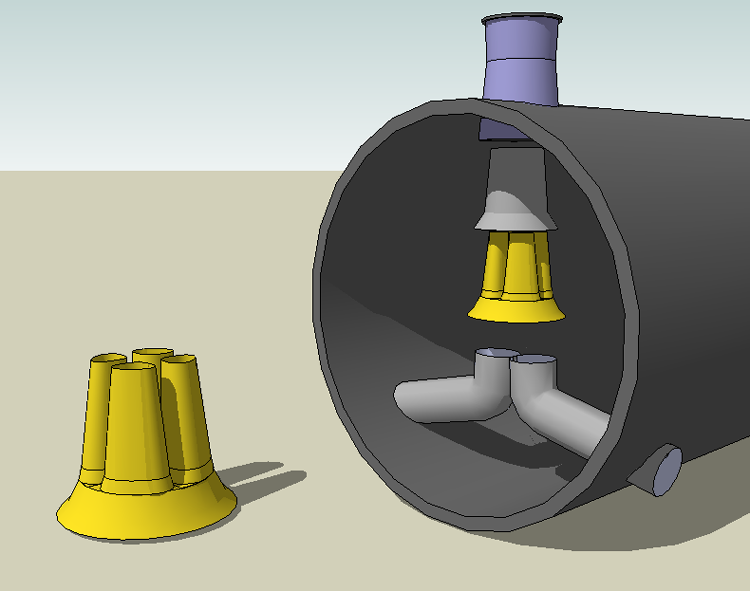
The Kylchap exhaust system

The aim of blastpipe modification is to obtain maximum smokebox vacuum with minimum back pressure on the pistons. The simplest modification is a double chimney with twin blastpipes, but many other arrangements have been tried. Towards the end of the steam era the Kylchap exhaust was popular and used on the Nigel Gresley-designed Mallard. Other designs include Giesl, Lemaître and Lempor blastpipes.
