= Maurice Lemaître (mechanical engineer) =

Maurice Lemaître (Maurice Édouard Jean Joseph Ghislain Lemaître; born Charleroi, 6 July 1898; died Etterbeek 25 December 1974) was a Belgian mechanical engineer who developed a steam locomotive exhaust system first used by the Nord-Belge railway company, a subsidiary of the French-owned Chemins de Fer du Nord.

The Lemaître exhaust (échappement Lemaître) – which featured a blastpipe with five nozzles in a circular pattern exhausting up a large-diameter chimney, plus a variable-area nozzle exhausting up the centre – produced an efficiency gain of around 10%.

The design was later improved by the Argentine engineer Livio Dante Porta, who devised the Lempor (a portmanteau of Lemaître and Porta) and later the Lemprex exhaust systems.
