= Chimney (locomotive) =

Part of a steam locomotive through which smoke leaves the boiler

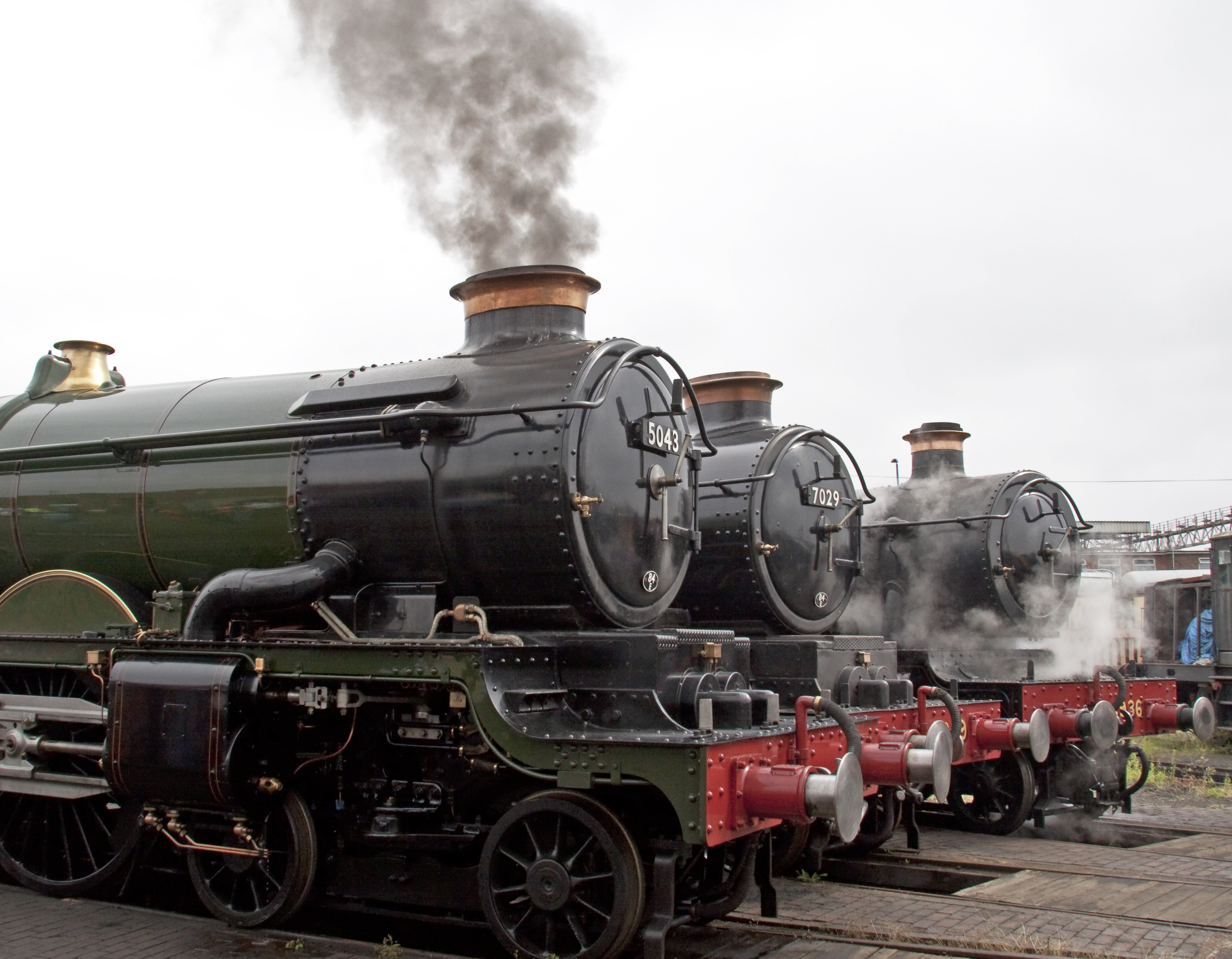
Great Western locomotives with their distinctive copper-rimmed chimneys

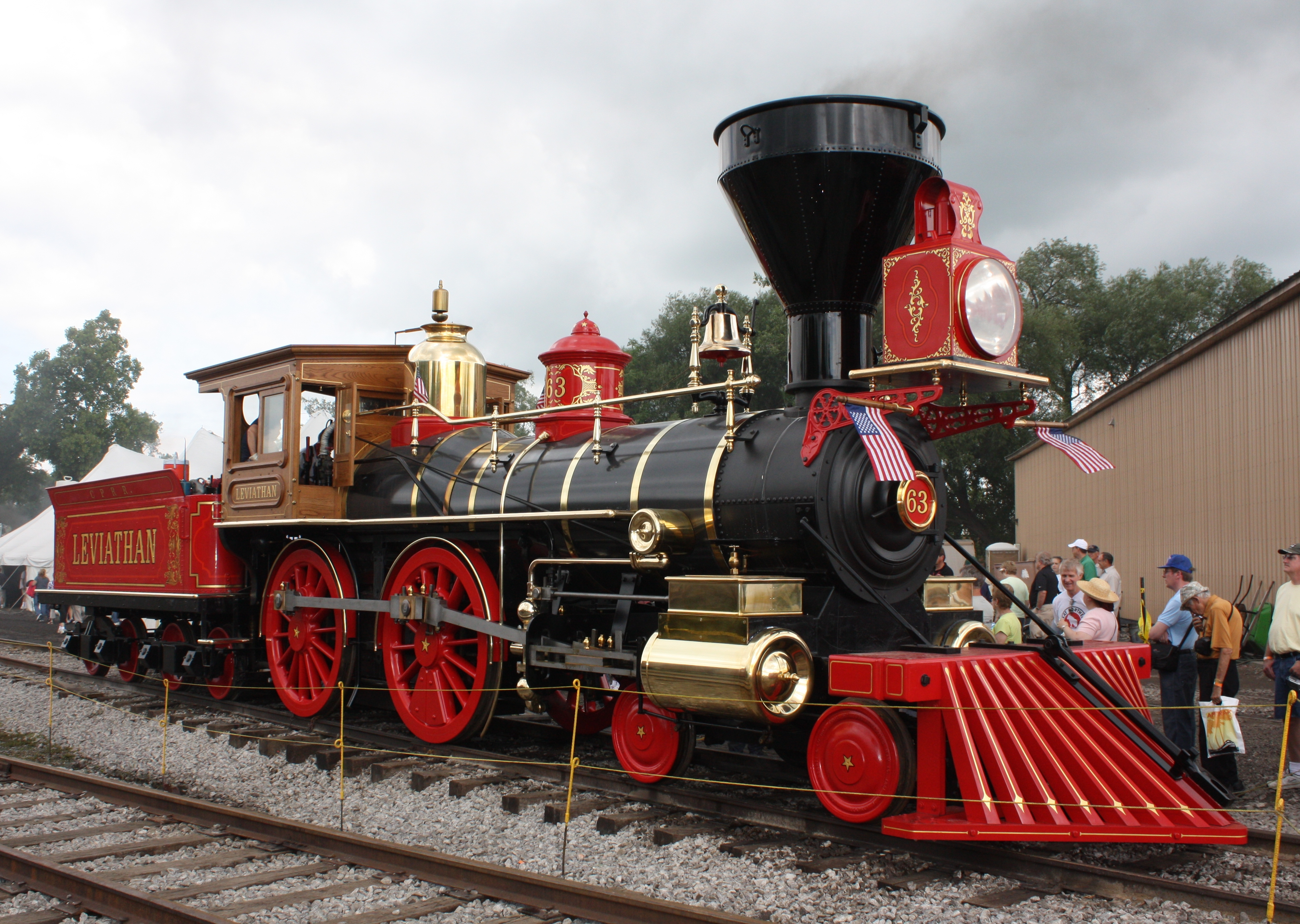
The new-build steam locomotive Leviathan, a 4-4-0 with a large spark-arresting chimney

The chimney (smokestack or stack in American and Canadian English and funnel in British English) is the part of a steam locomotive through which smoke leaves the boiler. As well, steam locomotive exhaust systems typically vent cylinder steam exhaust through the chimney, to enhance the draught through the boiler. Chimneys are designed to carry the exhaust steam and smoke clear of the driver's line of sight while remaining short enough to clear overhead structures. Some chimneys included apparatus to suppress the dispersal of sparks.

== Function ==
The chimney was usually located at the leading end of the locomotive, above the smokebox, furthest away from the driver's cab and firebox. The earliest locomotive chimneys were typically tall enough to sustain temperature-induced density difference draught through a fire-tube boiler while the locomotive was stationary. However, following the example of Richard Trevithick's first locomotive in 1804, most designs diverted steam cylinder exhaust upward through the chimney to create a vacuum in the smokebox, thereby accelerating airflow through the firebox while the locomotive was in motion.

High chimneys on locomotives with low footplates had the additional advantage of keeping smoke and condensing steam above the engine driver's field of vision. Grade limitations on railways through hilly terrain required tunnels and overhead bridges, which imposed a loading gauge limiting the height of chimneys. Increasing the velocity of steam exhaust tended to both accelerate airflow through the firebox and lift the smoke higher above the top of the chimney. By the 1830s, steam exhaust was directed through a contracted nozzle called a blastpipe, so as to achieve the desired velocity through the chimney. Pressure drop through the blastpipe nozzle was subtracted from the boiler pressure available to the steam pistons. Robert Stephenson estimated some locomotives lost half their power through blastpipe back pressure.

As developments in boiler design led to improvements in heat transfer efficiency, blast pipe diameters increased to reduce back pressure, and blastpipes became shorter, discharging below the chimney rather than within it. Ross Winans placed conical "petticoat pipes" above blastpipes about 1848 to form the convergent portion of a venturi tube, with the chimney forming the divergent portion. Improved understanding of compressible flow encouraged more sophisticated blastpipe and venturi chimney designs. George Jackson Churchward, working at Swindon on the Great Western Railway, formulated a simple equation for calculating the ideal dimensions for chimneys, which worked well for the early years of the 20th century, but become outdated as engine power increased. André Chapelon in France continued to work on chimney dimensions and studied them, in conjunction with blastpipe dimensions, as a complete exhaust system. That led to his famous Kylchap system, which was fitted to many classes of locomotives worldwide. Even after the use of commercial steam locomotives in most of the developed world came to an end, the Argentinean engineer Livio Dante Porta continued to work on developing steam locomotive exhaust systems, including refining equations to give better chimney dimensions.

== Spark arrestors ==
Early locomotives built in Great Britain, where coke was the most common fuel, often used chimneys of cast iron, because they lasted longer than chimneys fabricated from sheet metal. Early North American locomotives often used wood fuel, which resulted in large numbers of glowing embers being carried through the boiler from the firebox and blasted out of the chimney by the high-velocity exhaust steam. To reduce the number of fires started by escaped embers, spark arrestors became a common feature of wood-burning locomotive chimneys. The difficulty of casting complex spark arrestors encouraged fabrication of sheet metal chimneys for wood-burning locomotives.

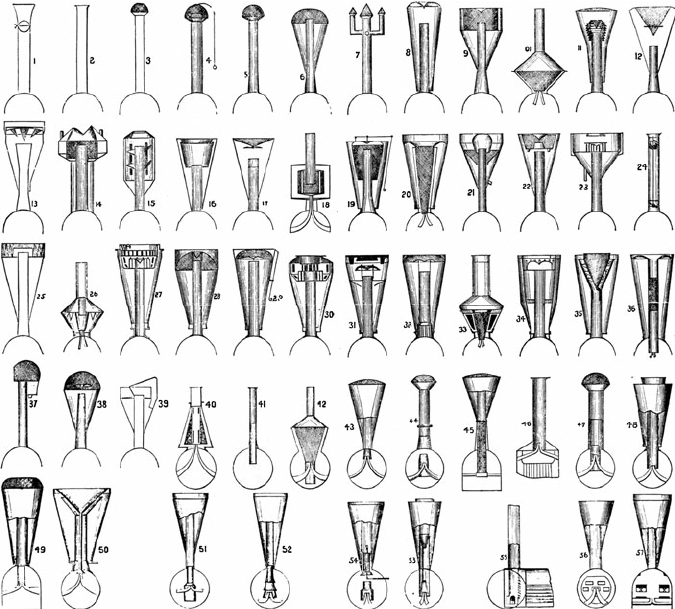
Fifty-seven of over one thousand locomotive spark arrestors patented in the United States, 1857

Early spark arrestors were simply iron wire screens installed within the stack. However, the screen reduced the rate at which smoke and steam could escape from the boiler. As well, embers caught by the screen further reduced available space for the passage of steam, and smoke and heat generated by the burning embers rapidly melted the wire screen. Chimney top diameters were enlarged to increase screen surface area and reduce smoke velocity through the screen so that embers could fall away from the screen into collection hoppers. In response to an 1857 patent infringement claim, Baldwin Locomotive Works compiled a diagram illustrating 57 different spark arresting chimney designs.

The most popular design was a bonnet chimney. The bonnet was a funnel-shaped sheet metal cone fitted over a conventional cylindrical chimney. The lower, small-diameter portion of the cone served as a collection hopper for falling embers. The upper portion of the cone concealed an inner cone at the top of the cylindrical chimney, which deflected escaping steam, smoke and embers outward against the inner walls of the outer cone. The heavier embers were expected to fall into the hopper below, while the lighter steam and smoke passed upward through a wire screen over the upper, large-diameter end of the outer cone. Deflection of the embers typically limited the life of the screen to three or four weeks. Some of those chimneys included provision for dropping collected embers into a portion of the smokebox called the subtreasury. Sophisticated designs, such as the Radley & Hunter, incorporated various centrifugal separation baffles into the bonnet. As coal replaced wood fuel, the bonnet was reduced into a simple diamond chimney, housing the inner deflecting cone, with or without the upper wire screen, but without any collection hopper.

== Aesthetics ==
The bonnet chimney became one of the most distinctive features 19th-century American locomotives. That, along with a large rectangular oil headlamp, gave them an air of grandeur. Many designers or railway companies had their own distinctive style, such as the William Adams's "Stovepipe" chimney on the 19th century London and South Western Railway, or the copper-capped chimneys on the Great Western Railway.

As locomotive boilers grew larger, the space available for chimneys was reduced, because they still had to fit within the same loading gauge. That reduced the effectiveness of the chimney in keeping the exhaust gases away from the driver's line of sight and, as a result, locomotives had to be fitted with devices such as smoke deflectors.

== See also ==
- Double chimney

== Sources ==
- Phillips, Lance (1965). Yonder Comes the Train. Cranberry, New Jersey: A.S. Barnes and Company. ISBN 0-498-06303-8.
- Sears, Francis Weston; Zemansky, Mark W. (1964). University Physics (Third ed.). Reading, Massachusetts: Addison-Wesley Publishing Company.
- White, John H. Jr. (1979). A History of the American Locomotive (Dover ed.). New York: Dover Publications. ISBN 0-486-23818-0.
