= Kylpor ejector =

Steam locomotive exhaust system

A Kylpor ejector is a type of steam locomotive exhaust system developed by noted Argentine locomotive engineer Livio Dante Porta. In a steam locomotive, draft is produced in the firebox by exhausting the steam coming from the cylinders out the chimney. The Kylpor exhaust delivers improved draughting capacity over traditional exhaust systems, and is a later development of the Kylchap exhaust.
