= Lemaître exhaust =

Steam locomotive exhaust system

The Lemaître exhaust is a type of steam locomotive exhaust system developed by the Belgian engineer Maurice Lemaître.

== Construction ==
The Lemaître exhaust featured a blastpipe with 5 nozzles in a circular pattern exhausting up a large-diameter chimney stack, with a variable area nozzle exhausting up the centre, and improved efficiency by about 10%.

== Uses ==
The Lemaître exhaust was used extensively in Great Britain by Oliver Bulleid on his locomotive designs for the Southern Railway, namely the Merchant Navy, Light Pacific and Q1 classes. Bulleid also retro-fitted Lemaître exhausts on some older classes, such as the SR Lord Nelson class and some of the SR V Schools class.

== Further development ==
The design was later improved by Livio Dante Porta, who created the Lempor and Lemprex, named after a combination of their two names.
