= Giesl ejector =

Steam locomotive exhaust system

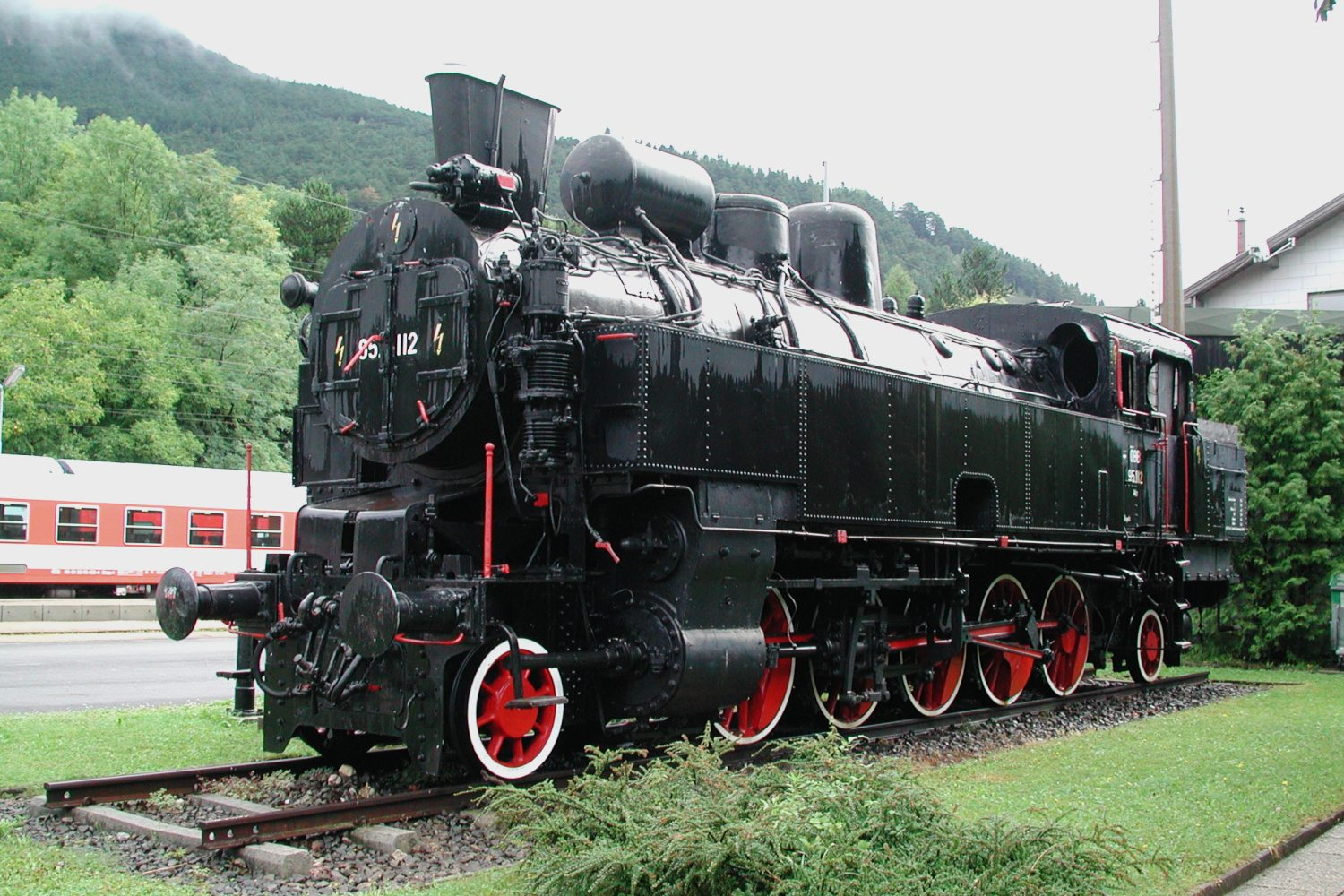
Steam locomotive with Giesl flat ejector in Austria

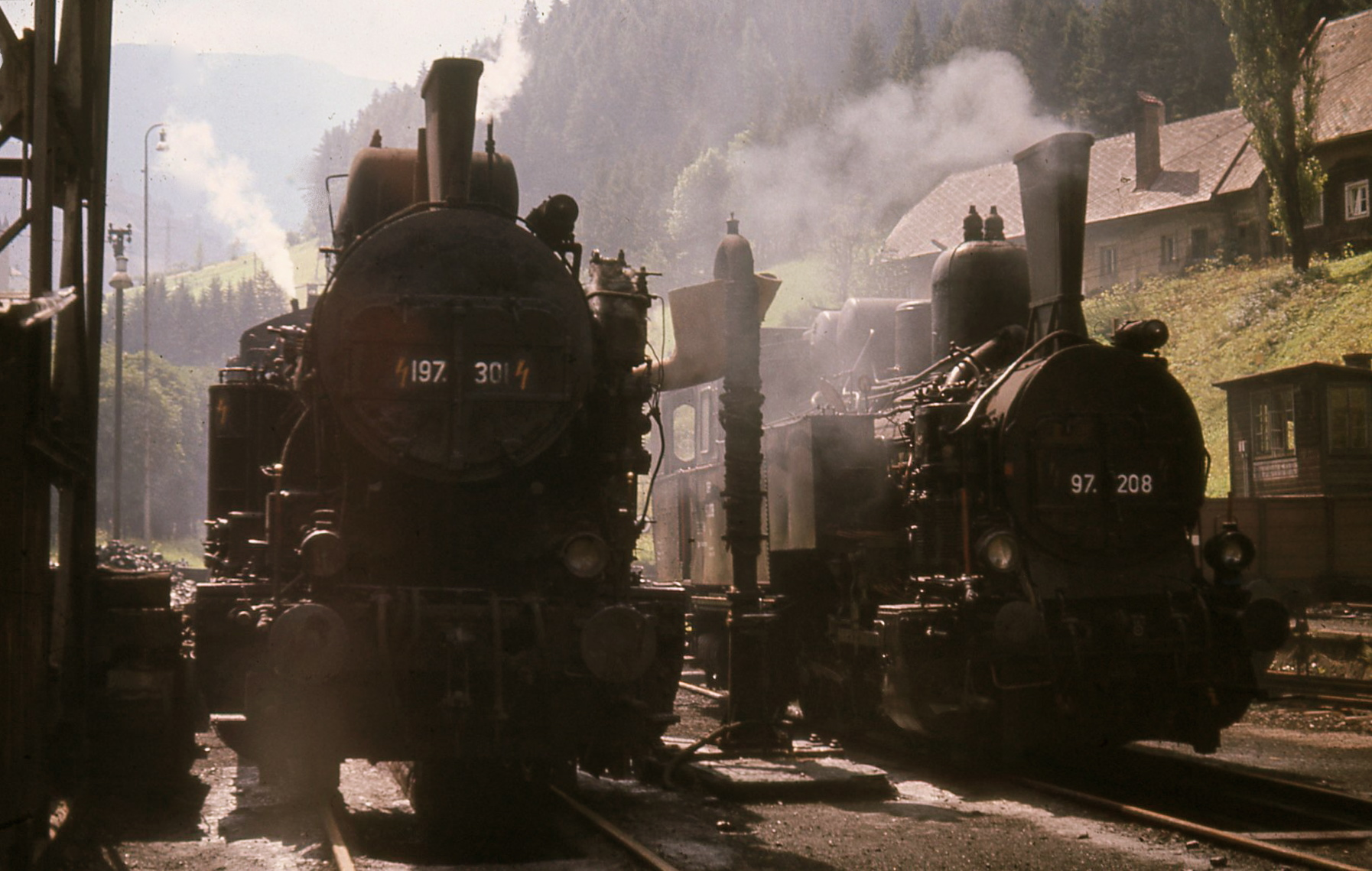
Austrian 0-12-0T and 0-6-2T fitted with Giesl ejectors, Eisenerz depot, August 1971

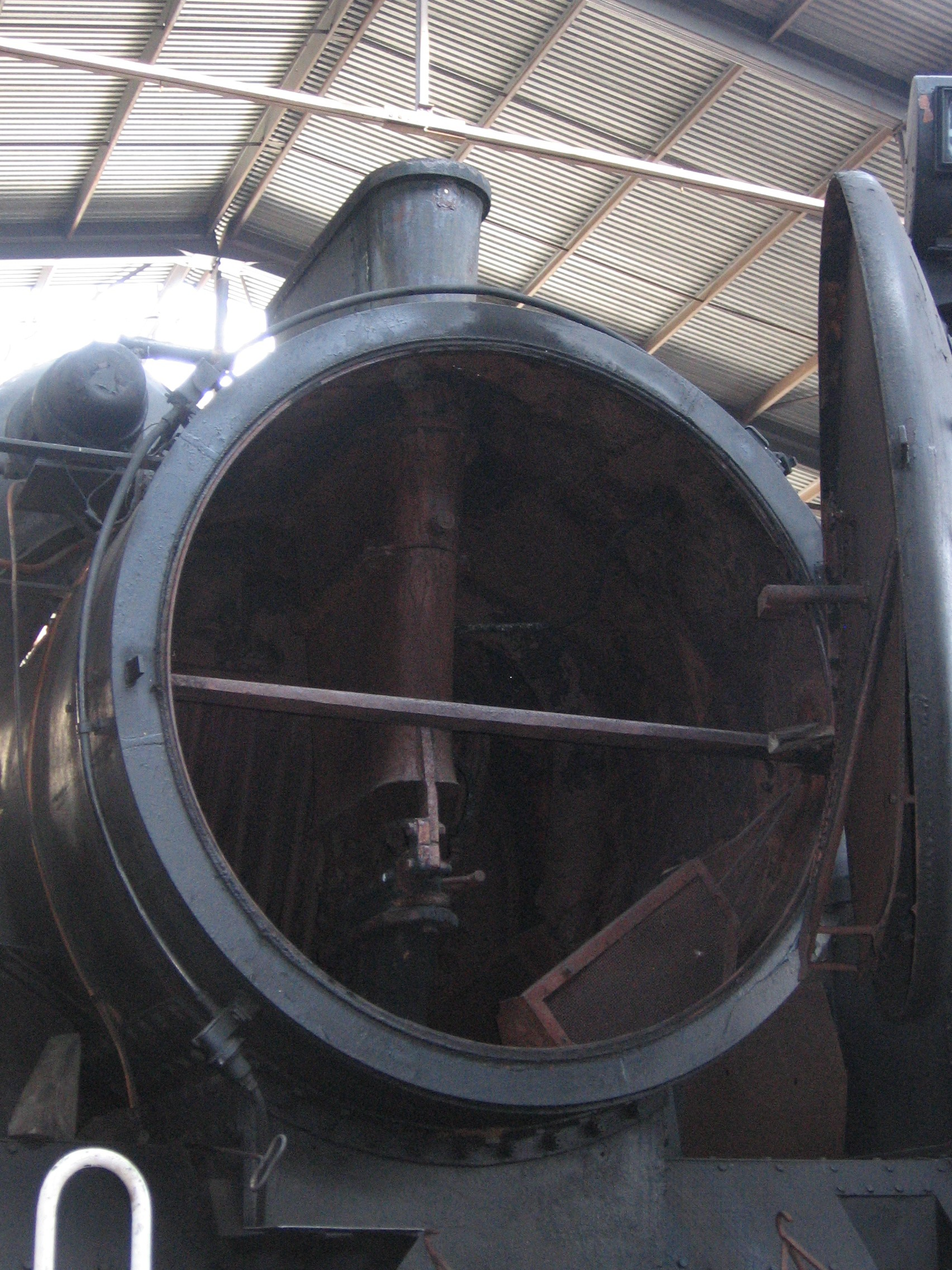
Smokebox with Giesl-ejector on the ČSD 534.0432 in museum Lužná u Rakovníka

A Giesl ejector is a suction draught system for steam locomotives that works on the same principle as a feedwater injector. This ejector (German: Ejektor, Flachschornstein or Quetschesse) was invented in 1951 by the Austrian engineer, Dr. Adolph Giesl-Gieslingen. The Giesl ejector ensures improved suction draught and a correspondingly better use of energy. The existing blastpipe in a locomotive is replaced by several, small, fan-shaped, diverging blast pipes, from which the diffuser gets its flat, long, drawn-out shape.

== Fuel savings ==
Giesl claimed that his ejector enabled a saving in coal of 6–12% – although in practice the maximum saving was closer to 8% – and an increase in power of up to 20%. Many railway administrations converted their steam engines to use Giesl ejectors, including the ÖBB, ČSD and Deutsche Reichsbahn (DR) in East Germany, as well as railway companies in Africa, China and in Japan (such as on the Class D51). The licence fees were not paid in every case, it being said that often they almost cancelled out the saving in coal. In the DR it was assessed that the Giesl ejectors would pay for themselves within a year, as a result of which they converted over 500 locomotives; primarily the Classes 38.10, 50, 52 and 65.10.

== Use in the United Kingdom ==
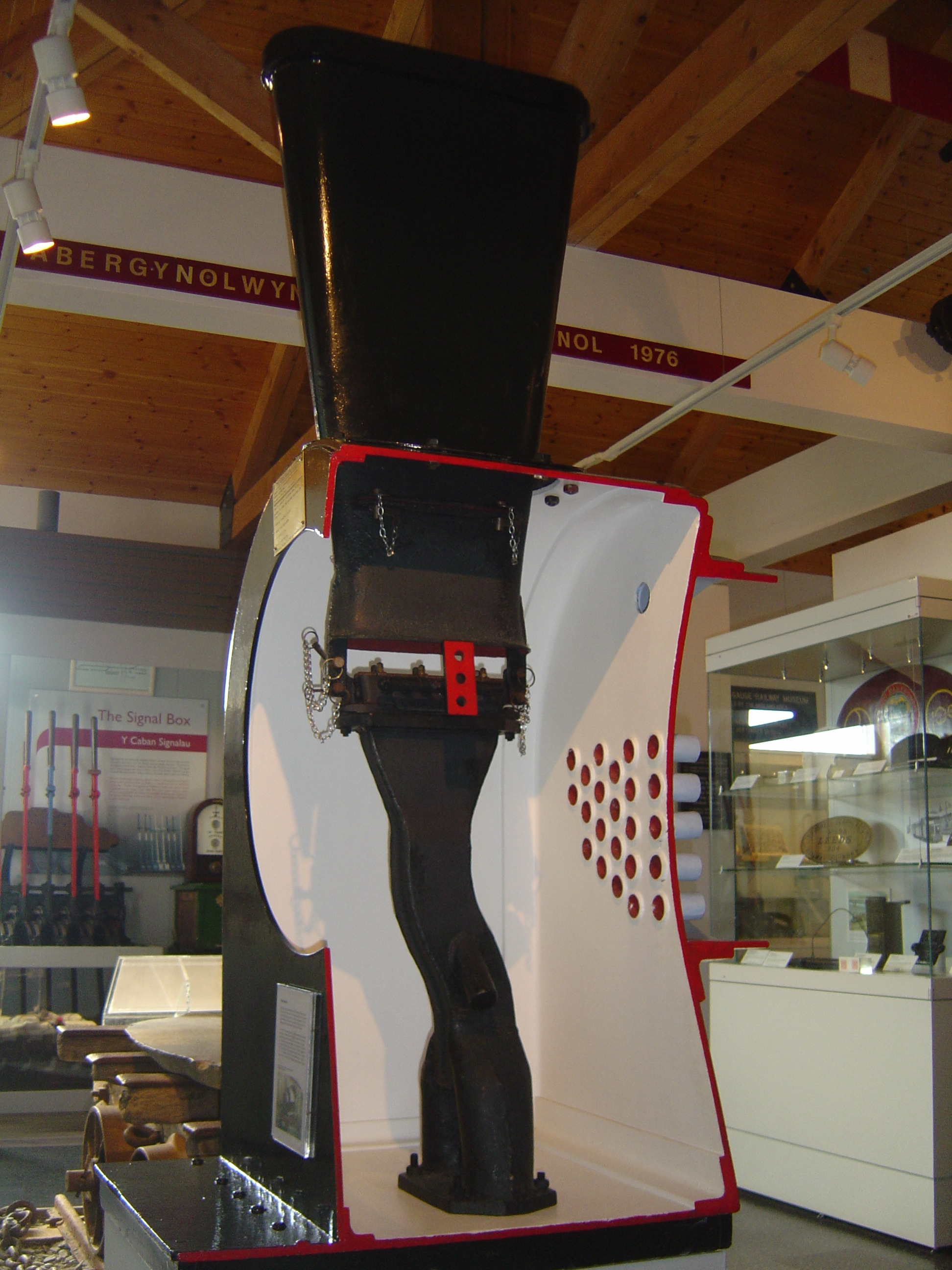
Ejector from Edward Thomas, on display in the Narrow Gauge Railway Museum

=== Talyllyn Railway ===
In 1958, Dr Giesl-Gieslingen approached British Railways to offer a free trial of the ejector. When this offer was turned down, the inventor made the same offer to the preserved Talyllyn Railway in Wales, and locomotive No. 4, Edward Thomas was fitted with one. Although a coal saving of 40% was officially announced at the time, this has since been disputed by the railway's chief engineer. The ejector was removed in 1969, and no difference in coal consumption was found. The ejector is now on display in the Narrow Gauge Railway Museum at Tywyn.

=== British Railways ===
In 1962, Bulleid Battle of Britain class 4-6-2 34064 Fighter Command was fitted with a Giesl ejector on the grounds that a desired spark arrestor would "suffocate" an ordinary blastpipe. It quickly became apparent, following some adjustment, that the ejector improved the locomotive design, and it was held in high regard by the crews. A BR Standard Class 9F 2-10-0 92250 was also fitted with a Giesl ejector, but with "indifferent" results.

=== National Coal Board ===
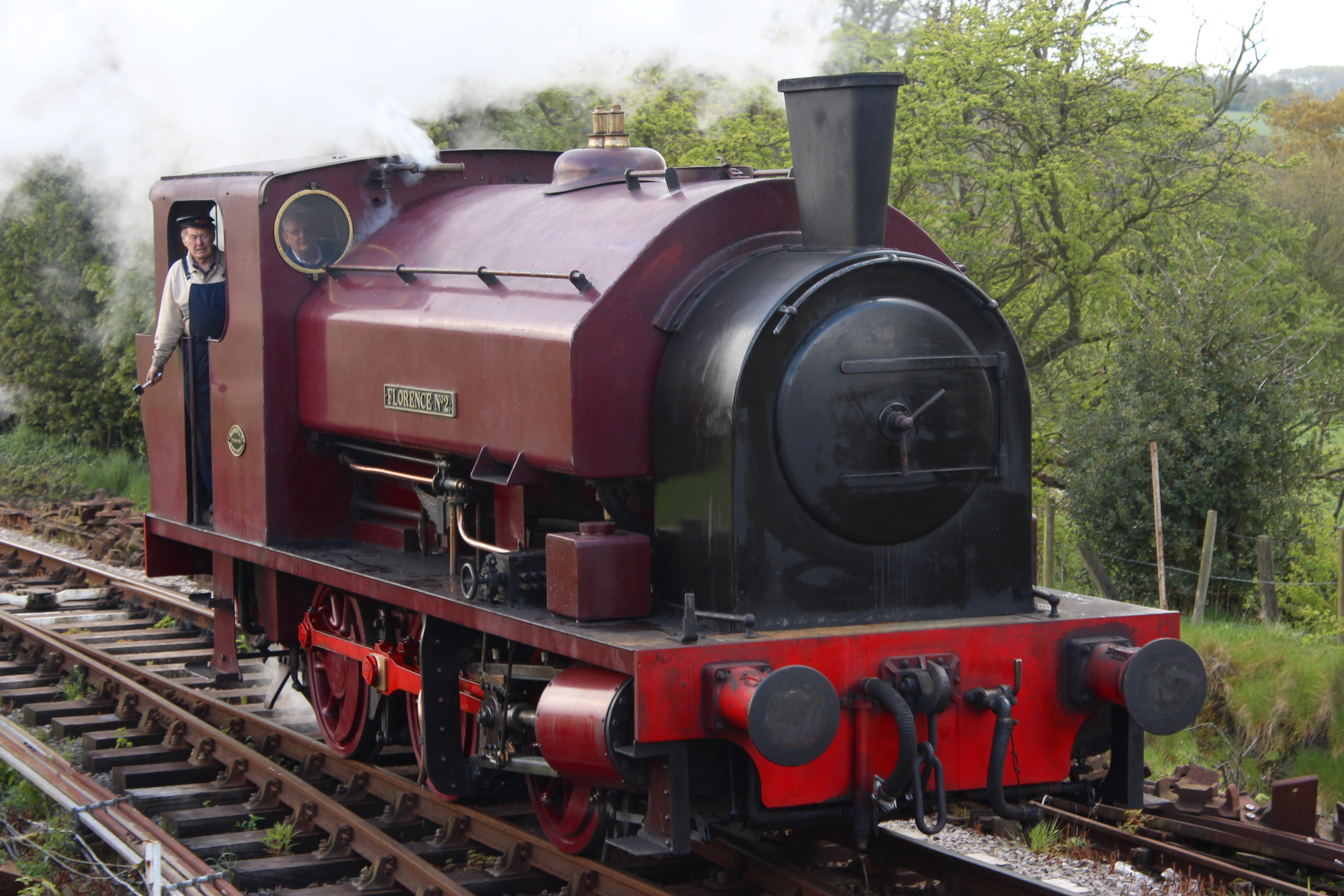
W. G. Bagnall 0-6-0ST No. 2 "Florence" (17592116039)

The National Coal Board had a vast array of coal mines all around the UK and therefore employed a massive fleet of steam locomotives. With the requirement for locomotives, NCB acquired locomotives from various locomotive builders such as Hunslet, W. G. Bagnall, Peckett, Andrew Barclay and many more builders, which all provided locomotives of various designs to the NCB, the most notable locomotives were the Hunslet Austerity 0-6-0ST locomotives. The National Coal Board wanted to improve its steam locomotives and experimented with different blastpipe arrangements, and notably worked with Livio Dante Porta and Hunslet to create the Porta locomotives. The NCB also upgraded many of its locomotives with Giesl ejectors, with 25 of its Hunslet Austerity locomotives being upgraded to have them. NCB also upgraded a number of other locomotives such as the W.G Bagnall 0-6-0ST 3059 Florence No 2 to have Giesl ejectors, Florence No 2 is preserved at the Foxfield Railway.

=== Keighley and Worth Valley Railway ===
As a consequence of the experience with Fighter Command, and for the same reasons, during the 1980s the preserved Bulleid West Country class 4-6-2 34092 City of Wells was similarly fitted at the Keighley and Worth Valley Railway.

== Use in Japan ==
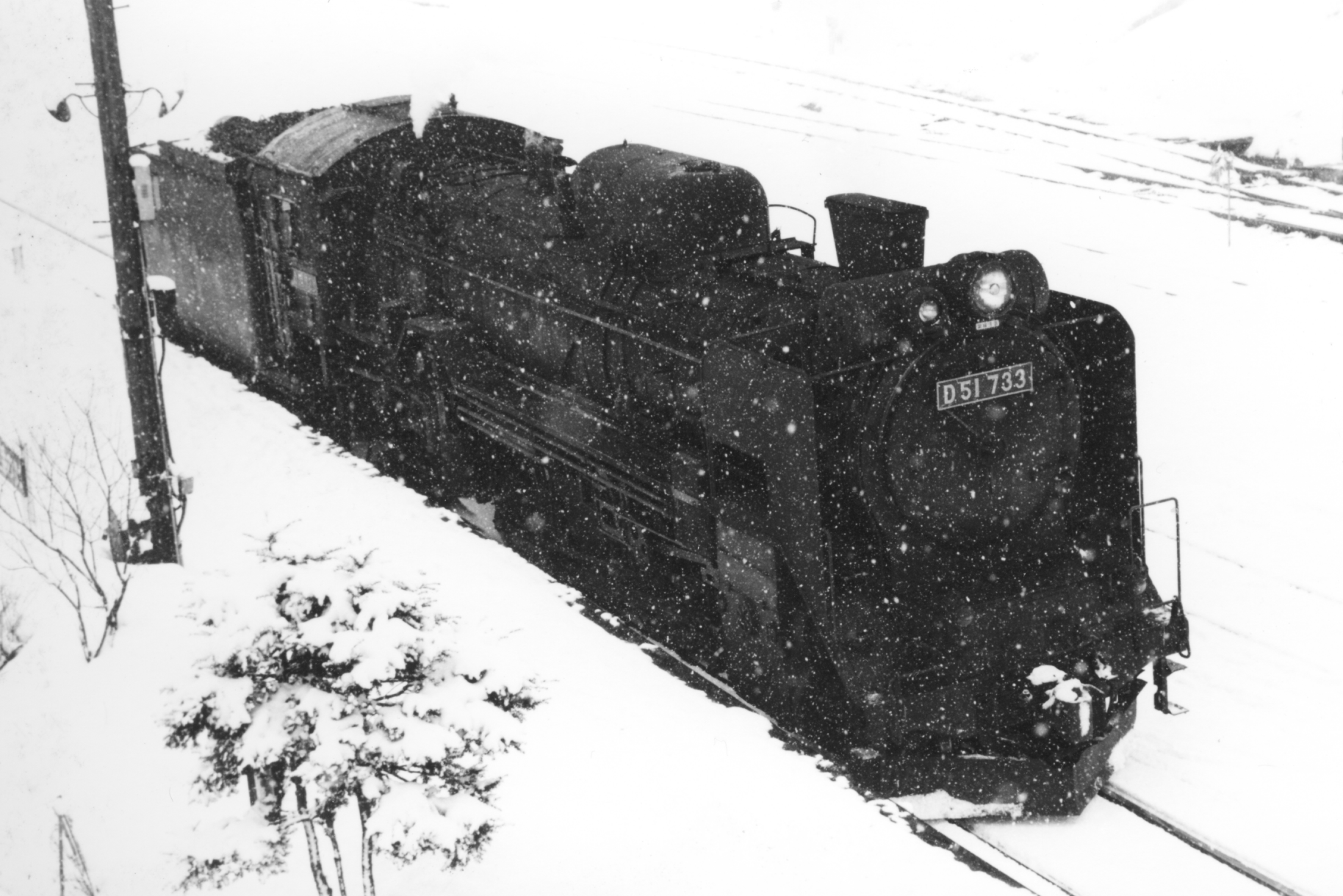
D51 733 fitted with a Giesl ejector

The Japanese National Railways adopted the ejector in the early 1960s, towards the end of its electrification and dieselisation process. At least 36 Class D51 freight locomotives are confirmed to have been fitted with ejectors during their final years. The last regular steam train in Japanese rail history, freight train 6788 on the Yubari Line, was hauled by one of these locomotives, D51 241, on 24 December 1975.

== Australian Railways ==
=== New South Wales Government Railways ===
NSWGR only had one locomotive in its entire fleet which was fitted with a Giesl ejector. The locomotive being 3616, a member of the NSWGR C36 class 4-6-0. In 1957, 3616 was fitted with a Giesl ejector along with its new Belpaire boiler. 3616, has made it into preservation. In the ownership of the New South Wales Rail Transport Museum located at Thirlmere, the locomotive is a static exhibit in the Thirlmere Train Hall.

== In fiction ==
On the fictional narrow gauge Skarloey Railway in The Railway Series by the Rev. W. Awdry based on the Talyllyn Railway, the locomotive Peter Sam, based on Edward Thomas, also received a Giesl ejector, after an accident involving an icicle on a tunnel roof knocked off his old chimney. Unlike Edward Thomas, Peter Sam retains the ejector to the present day. In Thomas & Friends, the television adaptation, it was depicted as a square chimney (as on his TV series model, his old chimney was never removed and the new chimney was a shroud placed over the old one), but was changed to an accurate Giesl Ejector in the CGI series.
