= List of King Arthur class locomotives =

Below are the names and numbers of the LSWR N15 class/SR 'King Arthur' Class locomotives. Another successful publicity campaign by the Southern Railway when named from 1925 onwards, they represented the counties of Devon and Somerset, UK, due to their association with the legend of King Arthur. The batches have been separated for ease of reference.

== The Urie Arthurs ==
BR No.	SR No.	SR Name	Builder	Built	Withdrawn	Notes
30736	736	Excalibur	LSWR, Eastleigh	August 1918	November 1956	Lemaître exhaust
30737	737	King Uther	LSWR, Eastleigh	October 1918	June 1956	Lemaître exhaust
30738	738	King Pellinore	LSWR, Eastleigh	December 1918	March 1958	
30739	739	King Leodegrance	LSWR, Eastleigh	February 1919	May 1957	
30740	740	Merlin	LSWR, Eastleigh	April 1919	December 1955	Deliberately involved in crash staged for film at Longmoor Military Railway
30741	741	Joyous Gard	LSWR, Eastleigh	April 1919	February 1956	Lemaître exhaust
30742	742	Camelot	LSWR, Eastleigh	June 1919	February 1957	
30743	743	Lyonnesse	LSWR, Eastleigh	August 1919	October 1955	
30744	744	Maid of Astolat	LSWR, Eastleigh	September 1919	January 1956	
30745	745	Tintagel	LSWR, Eastleigh	November 1919	February 1956	
30746	746	Pendragon	LSWR, Eastleigh	June 1922	October 1955	
30747	747	Elaine	LSWR, Eastleigh	July 1922	October 1956	
30748	748	Vivien	LSWR, Eastleigh	August 1922	September 1957	
30749	749	Iseult	LSWR, Eastleigh	September 1922	June 1957	
30750	750	Morgan le Fay	LSWR, Eastleigh	October 1922	July 1957	
30751	751	Etarre	LSWR, Eastleigh	November 1922	June 1957	
30752	752	Linette	LSWR, Eastleigh	December 1922	December 1955	Lemaître exhaust
30753	753	Melisande	LSWR, Eastleigh	January 1923	March 1957	
30754	754	The Green Knight	LSWR, Eastleigh	February 1923	February 1953	First member to be withdrawn from service in 1953 due to cracked frames.
30755	755	The Red Knight	LSWR, Eastleigh	March 1923	May 1957	Lemaître exhaust

== The Eastleigh Arthurs ==
BR No.	SR No.	SR Name	Builder	Built	Withdrawn	Notes	Image
30448	448	Sir Tristram	SR, Eastleigh	May 1925	August 1960		
30449	449	Sir Torre	SR, Eastleigh	June 1925	December 1959		
30450	450	Sir Kay	SR, Eastleigh	June 1925	September 1960		
30451	451	Sir Lamorak	SR, Eastleigh	June 1925	June 1962	Boiler preserved on the Mid-Hants Railway.	
30452	452	Sir Meliagrance	SR, Eastleigh	July 1925	August 1959		
30453	453	King Arthur	SR, Eastleigh	February 1925	July 1961		
30454	454	Queen Guinevere	SR, Eastleigh	March 1925	October 1958		
30455	455	Sir Lancelot	SR, Eastleigh	March 1925	April 1959		
30456	456	Sir Galahad	SR, Eastleigh	April 1925	May 1960		
30457	457	Sir Bedivere	SR, Eastleigh	April 1925	May 1961		
30793	793	Sir Ontzlake	SR, Eastleigh	March 1926	September 1962		
30794	794	Sir Ector de Maris	SR, Eastleigh	March 1926	August 1960		
30795	795	Sir Dinadan	SR, Eastleigh	April 1926	August 1962		
30796	796	Sir Dodinas le Savage	SR, Eastleigh	April 1926	March 1962		
30797	797	Sir Blamor de Ganis	SR, Eastleigh	June 1926	May 1959		
30798	798	Sir Hectimere	SR, Eastleigh	June 1926	June 1962		
30799	799	Sir Ironside	SR, Eastleigh	July 1926	February 1961	Boiler preserved at the Mid-Hants Railway, fitted on S15 No. 506 and steamed.	
30800	800	Sir Meleaus de Lile	SR, Eastleigh	September 1926	September 1961		
30801	801	Sir Meliot de Logres	SR, Eastleigh	October 1926	April 1959		
30802	802	Sir Durnore	SR, Eastleigh	October 1926	July 1961		
30803	803	Sir Harry le Fise Lake	SR, Eastleigh	November 1926	September 1961		
30804	804	Sir Cador of Cornwall	SR, Eastleigh	December 1926	February 1962		
30805	805	Sir Constantine	SR, Eastleigh	January 1927	June 1959		
30806	806	Sir Galleron	SR, Eastleigh	January 1927	April 1961	Suffered bomb damage from a V-1 flying bomb on 16 August 1944 but was later repaired.	

== The Scotch Arthurs ==
BR No.	SR No.	SR Name	Builder	Built	Withdrawn	Notes	Image
30763	763	Sir Bors de Ganis	North British Loco 23209	May 1925	October 1960		
30764	764	Sir Gawain	North British Loco 23210	May 1925	July 1961		
30765	765	Sir Gareth	North British Loco 23211	May 1925	September 1962		
30766	766	Sir Geraint	North British Loco 23212	May 1925	December 1958		
30767	767	Sir Valence	North British Loco 23213	May 1925	June 1959		
30768	768	Sir Balin	North British Loco 23214	May 1925	November 1961		
30769	769	Sir Balan	North British Loco 23215	June 1925	March 1960		
30770	770	Sir Prianius	North British Loco 23216	June 1925	November 1962	This locomotive was the subject of a spelling mistake, as the Knight of the same name in the book Le Morte d'Arthur by Sir Thomas Malory was Sir Priamus.	
30771	771	Sir Sagramore	North British Loco 23217	June 1925	February 1961		
30772	772	Sir Percivale	North British Loco 23218	June 1925	September 1961		
30773	773	Sir Lavaine	North British Loco 23219	June 1925	February 1962		
30774	774	Sir Gaheris	North British Loco 23220	June 1925	January 1960		
30775	775	Sir Agravaine	North British Loco 23221	June 1925	February 1960		
30776	776	Sir Galagars	North British Loco 23222	June 1925	January 1959		
30777	777	Sir Lamiel	North British Loco 23223	June 1925	October 1961	Preserved as part of the National Collection, under overhaul at the Great Central Railway.	
30778	778	Sir Pelleas	North British Loco 23224	July 1925	May 1959		
30779	779	Sir Colgrevance	North British Loco 23225	July 1925	July 1959		
30780	780	Sir Persant	North British Loco 23226	July 1925	July 1959		
30781	781	Sir Aglovale	North British Loco 23227	August 1925	May 1962		
30782	782	Sir Brian	North British Loco 23228	July 1925	September 1962		
30783	783	Sir Gillemere	North British Loco 23279	August 1925	March 1961		
30784	784	Sir Nerovens	North British Loco 23280	September 1925	October 1959		
30785	785	Sir Mador de la Porte	North British Loco 23281	September 1925	October 1959		
30786	786	Sir Lionel	North British Loco 23282	September 1925	August 1959		
30787	787	Sir Menadeuke	North British Loco 23283	September 1925	February 1959		
30788	788	Sir Urre of the Mount	North British Loco 23284	September 1925	February 1962		
30789	789	Sir Guy	North British Loco 23285	September 1925	December 1959		
30790	790	Sir Villiars	North British Loco 23286	September 1925	November 1961		
30791	791	Sir Uwaine	North British Loco 23287	September 1925	May 1960		
30792	792	Sir Hervis de Revel	North British Loco 23288	September 1925	February 1959		
