= William Freeman Myrick Goss =

American mechanical engineer (1859–1928)

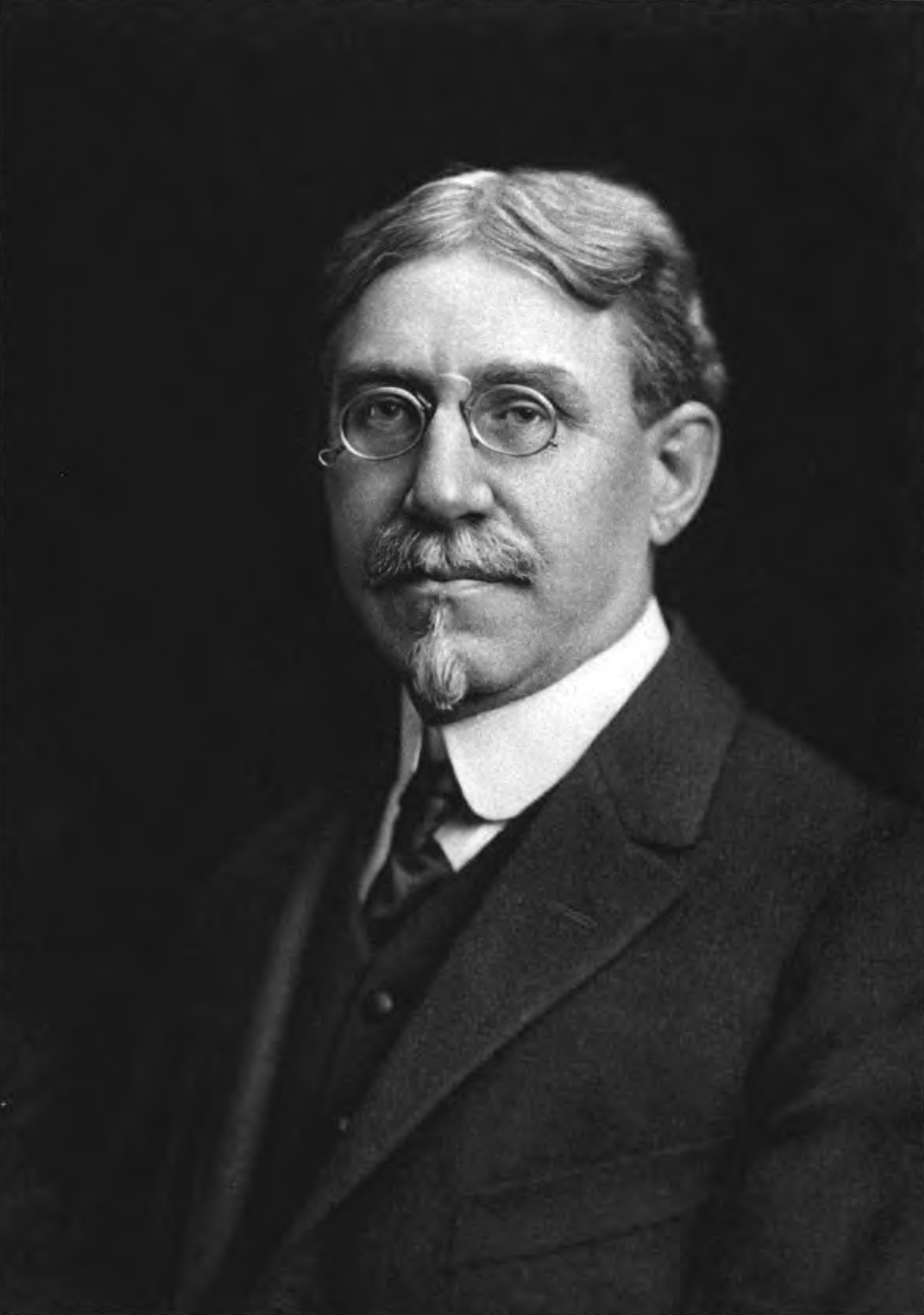
William Freeman Myrick Goss

William Freeman Myrick Goss (October 7, 1859 – March 23, 1928) was an American mechanical engineer, inventor, Professor at Purdue University and its first dean of engineering, author and president of the American Society of Mechanical Engineers.

== Biography ==
=== Youth and education ===
Goss was born in Barnstable, Massachusetts as son of Franklin B. Goss and Mary Gorham (Parker) Goss. His father had been owner and editor of The Barnstable Patriot, and his two elder brothers followed into his footsteps. At early age Goss had developed an interest in engineering, and build model steam engines from scrap in his father's print shop. He maintained the prime mover in the shop, and installed a steam engine in a small boat at the age of 17.

In 1877 Goss was among the first students of a new two year practical mechanics course at the Massachusetts Institute of Technology. The course was built on a Russian system of instruction, introduced at the Centennial Exposition a year earlier. It was focussed on the production system instead of manual training, lectures on college level, and exercised to design saleable article of furniture, or tools. Goss completed the course in two years.

=== Early career ===
After his graduation at MIT in 1879, Goss was appointed instructor in mechanics at Purdue University. In the next decade Goss taught practical mechanics, developed instruction for shop work, and was appointed the first professor of practical mechanics at Purdue University. After a six months leave-of-absence in 1888–89, Goss was appointed professor of experimental mechanics at Purdue University and founded its engineering laboratory.

In 1899 Goss took a nine-month leave-of-absence studying theory and practice in Europe in England, Germany and France. Afterwards he continued his academic work at Purdue University. From 1907 to 1917 he was dean of the College of Engineering at the University of Illinois, and in between served at the Chicago Association of Commerce directing studies on Smoke Abatement and Electrification of Railway Terminals. In the last years of his career Goss was president of the American Railway Car Manufacturers Association.

Goss was awarded an honorary Master of Arts from Wabash College in 1888, and a Doctor of Engineering from the University of Illinois in 1904. In the year 1913–14 he served as president of the American Society of Mechanical Engineers. Over the years he authored a series of engineering books and over 100 papers.

== Selected publications ==
- Goss, William Freeman Myrick. Bench work in wood; a course of study and practice designed for the use of schools and colleges. Hadley Press, 1905.
- Goss, William Freeman Myrick. Locomotive performance; the result of a series of researches conducted by the engineering laboratory of Purdue University. J. Wiley, 1906.
- Goss, William Freeman Myrick. High steam-pressures in locomotive service. No. 66. Carnegie institution of Washington, 1907.
- Goss, William Freeman Myrick. Smoke abatement and electrification of railway terminals in Chicago: Report of the Chicago Association of Commerce, Committee of Investigation on Smoke Abatement and Electrification of Railway Terminals. Rand, McNally, 1915.

Patents, a selection

- Patent US713297 - Distilling apparatus. March 1900
- Patent US890227 - Apparatus for treating liquids 1901.
- Patent US1275672 - Locomotive-engine 1918.
