= Smokebox =

Part of a steam locomotive

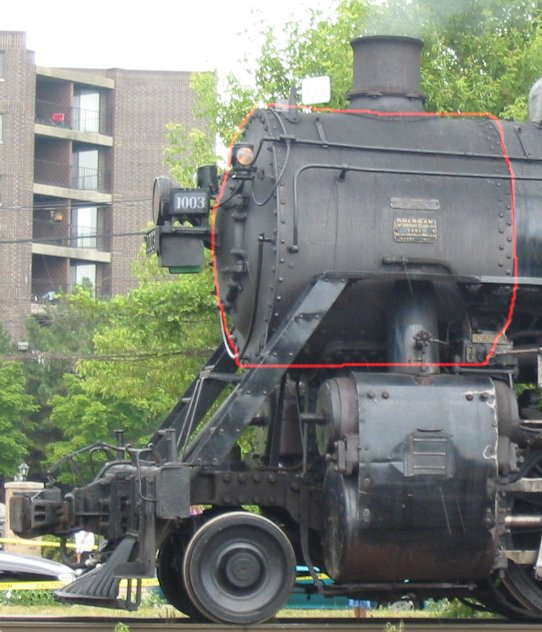
The smokebox (outlined in red) of Soo Line 1003.

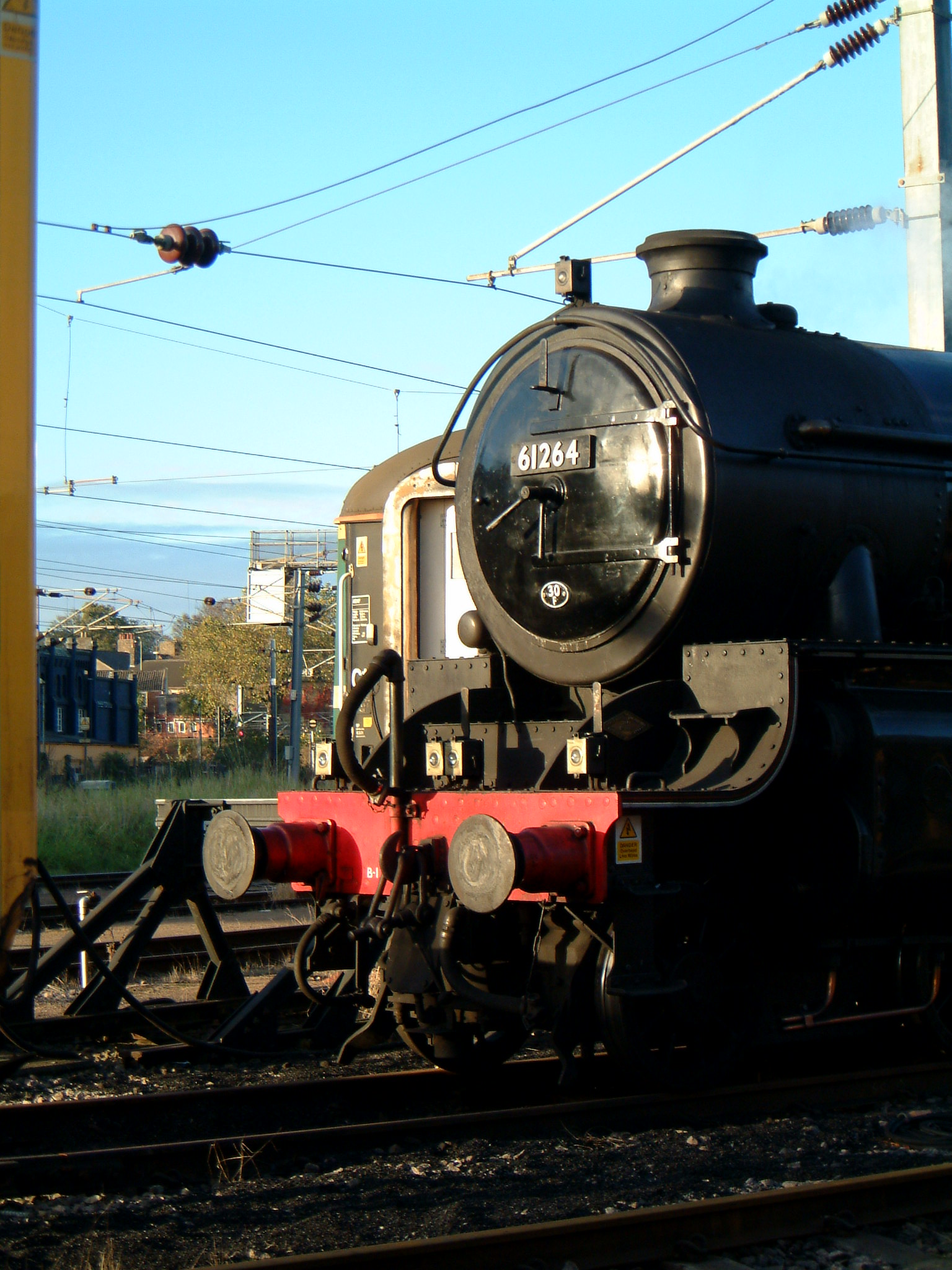
LNER Thompson Class B1 61264 at Crown Point TMD. The smokebox can be clearly seen, with the number affixed to the smokebox door.

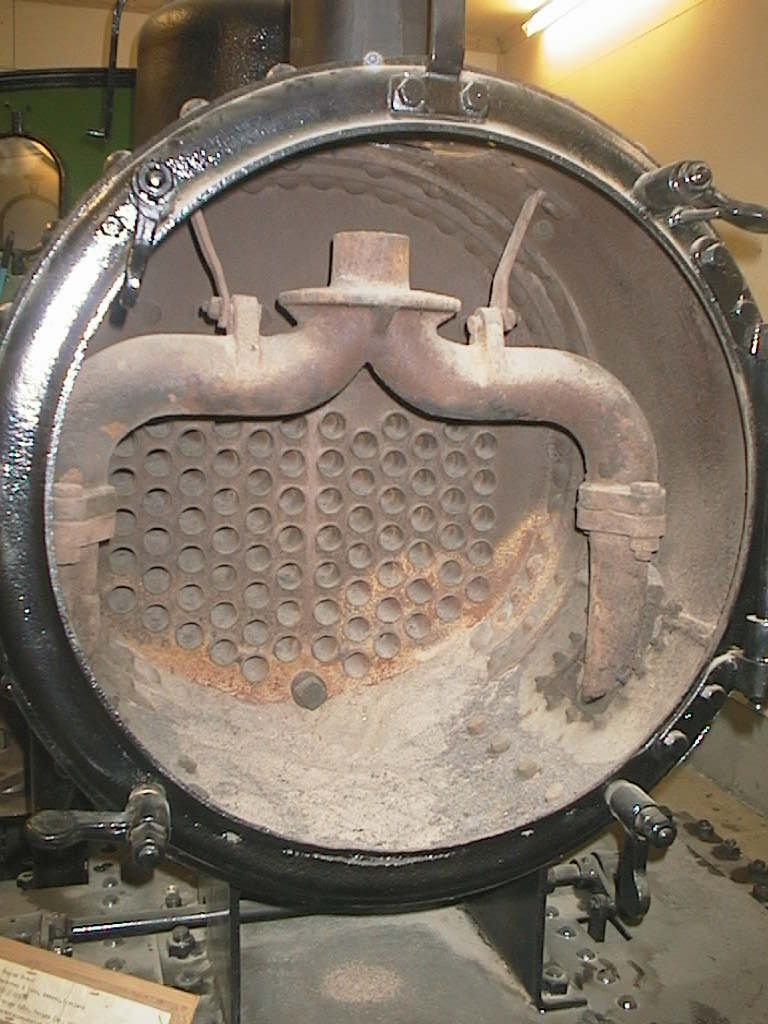
A smokebox with ash residues

A smokebox is one of the major basic parts of a steam locomotive exhaust system. Smoke and hot gases pass from the firebox through tubes where they pass heat to the surrounding water in the boiler. The smoke then enters the smokebox, and is exhausted to the atmosphere through the chimney (or funnel). Early locomotives had no smokebox and relied on a long chimney to provide natural draught for the fire but smokeboxes were soon included in the design for two specific reasons. Firstly and most importantly, the blast of exhaust steam from the cylinders, when directed upwards through an airtight smokebox with an appropriate design of exhaust nozzle, effectively draws hot gases through the boiler tubes and flues and, consequently, fresh combustion air into the firebox. Secondly, the smokebox provides a convenient collection point for ash and cinders ("char") drawn through the boiler tubes, which can be easily cleaned out at the end of a working day. Without a smokebox, all char must pass up the chimney or it will collect in the tubes and flues themselves, gradually blocking them.

The smokebox appears to be a forward extension of the boiler although it contains no water and is a separate component. Smokeboxes are usually made from riveted or welded steel plate and the floor is lined with concrete to protect the steel from hot char and acid or from a rainwater attack.

== Blower ==
To assist the passage of the smoke and hot gases, a blower is often used. This is a pipe ending in a ring containing pin-sized holes, which creates a "ring" of steam jets. The steam forces out the smoke and draws further gases through the tubes. This in turn causes air to be drawn through the grate and firehole, making the fire burn hotter.

== Blastpipe ==
When the locomotive is in motion, exhaust steam passes through the blastpipe, which is located within the smokebox. The steam is ejected through the chimney, again drawing the fire. The blastpipe is what produces the characteristic "chuff" sound.

The dimensions of the blastpipe and chimney are critical to the steam-generating capacity of the locomotive and its fuel economy, since there is a natural trade-off between a high-velocity steam jet giving a strong draw on the fire, and back-pressure on the exhaust. Small changes to this "front end" design can have a dramatic impact. More complex exhaust designs such as Kylchap, Lempor and Giesl, can achieve better results than the simple blastpipe and chimney arrangement.

== Smokebox door ==
Ashes and soot that may be present in the smoke are often deposited in the smokebox. The front of the smokebox has a door, which is opened to remove these deposits at the end of each locomotive's working day. The handle(s) must be tightened fully to prevent air leaks, which would reduce the draw on the fire and could also allow any unburnt char at the bottom of the smokebox to catch fire there. A leaking smokebox door is often revealed by a patch of red hot metal when the engine is working or blistered paint and rusted metal when cold.

Some smokebox doors have a single handle in the form of a wheel; many British-built locomotives, notably GWR and BR Standard types, have a pair of smokebox door handles resembling the hands of a clock; other designs also exist. The type with a pair of handles has a horizontal bar across the smokebox inside the door, a hole in which is engaged by a "dart" attached to the inner of the two handles when it is at 12 o'clock or 6 o'clock; the outer handle is used to lock the inner one. The Midland Railway and LMS notably used separate clamps around the circumference of the door, which allowed their characteristic smokebox number plate to be centrally located on the door.

On many steamrollers an extension to the body of the smokebox also houses the bearing which supports the front roller. Due to limitations of space, these rollers usually have a drop-down flap instead of a circular smokebox door.

== Steam pipes ==
The smokebox incorporates the main steam pipes from the regulator (or superheater header), one leading to each valve chest, a part of the cylinder casting. These pipes may pass through the smokebox wall to join with the cylinder (outside steam pipes) or may stay within the profile of the smokebox (inside steam pipes). Inside steam pipes do not require lagging as the smokebox keeps them warm, but outside steam pipes are more common for locomotives with cylinders outside the frames. Some locomotive classes used both types depending on the date the batch was constructed (e.g. LNER Class V2).

== Lagging ==
Because heat losses are of little consequence, the smokebox is not usually lagged. In most cases it appears to be the same diameter as the boiler in the finished locomotive but this is only because of the boiler cladding; the boiler is narrower. Tank engines usually had their water tanks stop short of the unlagged smokebox, as otherwise the temperature of the water could rise sufficiently to cause problems with the injectors.

== Self-cleaning smokebox ==
British Railways standard classes use this design, where a robust mesh grille is incorporated into the smokebox, forming a filter between the front tubeplate and the exhaust. Any large pieces of char passing through the boiler tubes tend to be broken up on impact with the mesh, creating finer particles that are swept up into the chimney instead of accumulating in the bottom of the smokebox. This does not negate the need to clean out the smokebox but reduces the amount of work that has to be done. In the best-case scenario, smokebox cleaning would be necessary only between boiler washouts, typically at intervals of two weeks.

== Locomotive layout ==
The classic layout of a steam locomotive has the smokebox and chimney at the front of the locomotive, referred to as traveling "smokebox-first". Some designs reversed the layout to avoid problems (asphyxiation and poor visibility) caused by having the exhaust blowing back onto the crew; these were called cab forward locomotives.

== Spark arrester ==
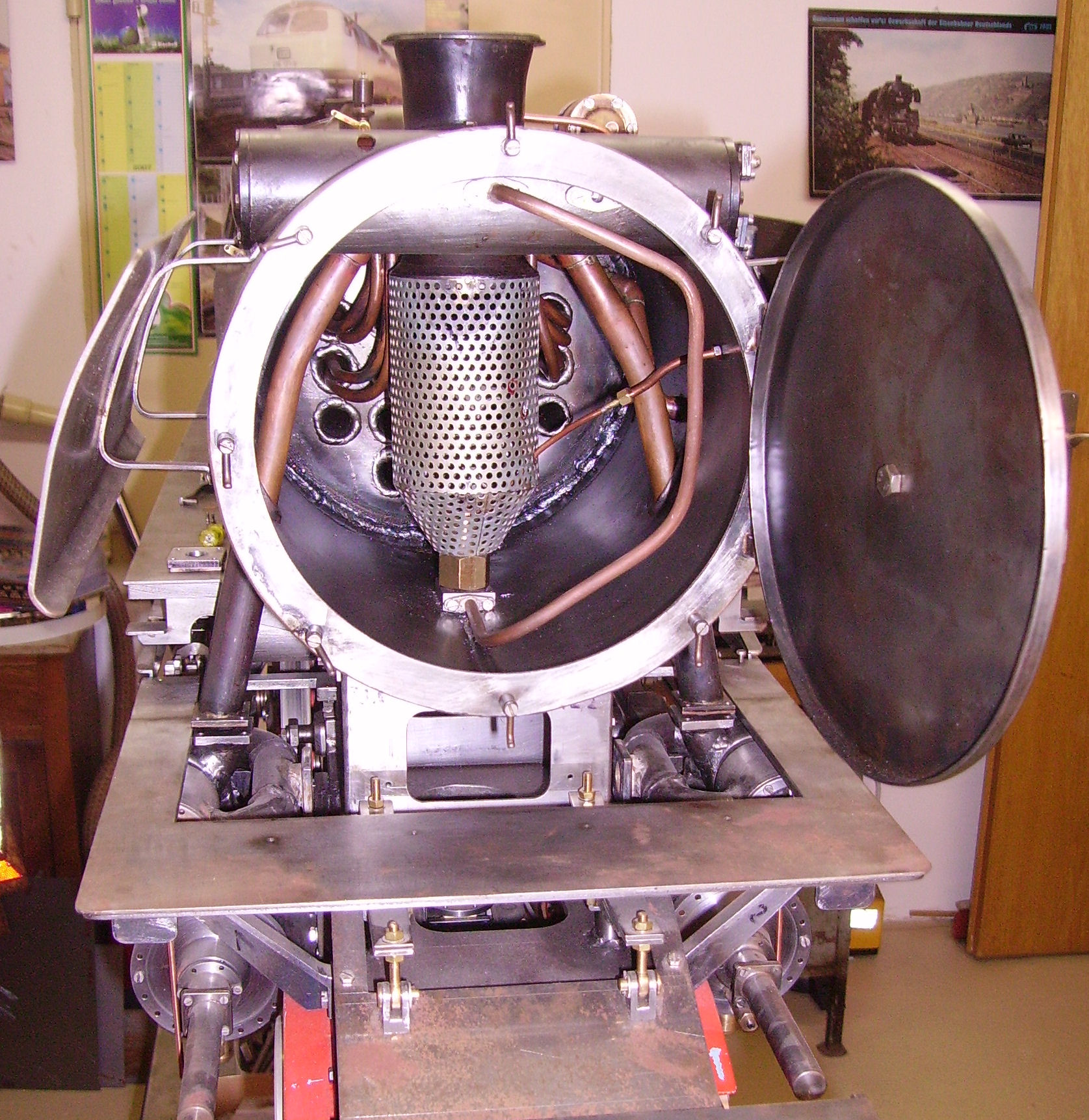
Model steam locomotive showing spark arrester mesh

A spark arrester is often installed within the smokebox. This may take the form of a cylindrical mesh running from the top of the blast pipe to the bottom of the chimney. Spark arresters are to prevent excessively large fragments of hot ash from being exhausted into the environment where they may pose a fire risk. For this reason, spark arresters are generally installed on locomotives running through dry environments. They should not be confused with the external spark arrestors fitted to some locomotives. The presence of a spark arrester may have a thermodynamic effect, distorting the draw of air over the fire and thereby reducing total power output. Thus their use can be contentious.

== Superheating ==
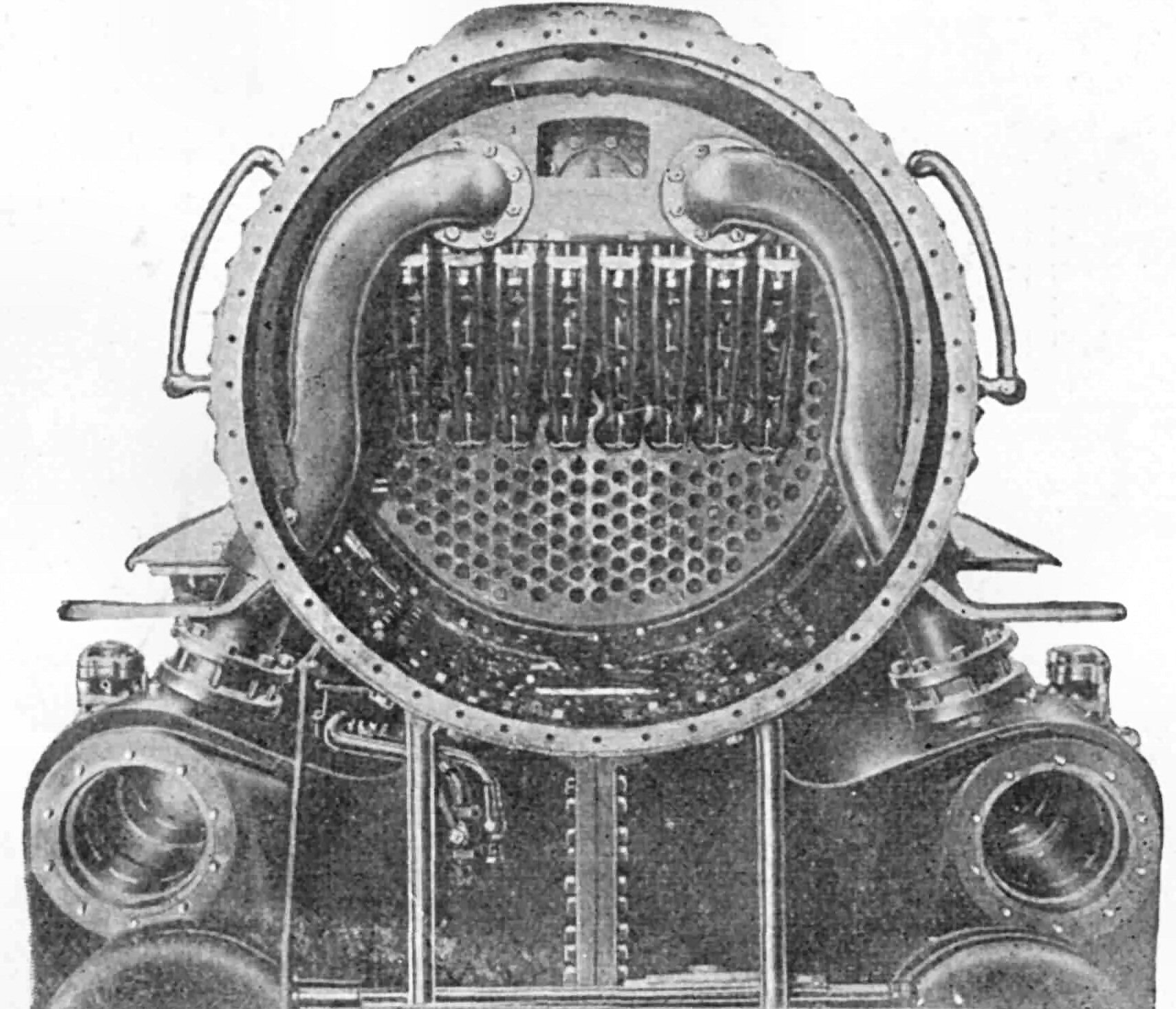
Superheater viewed from the smokebox. At the top center is the superheater header with pipes leading to cylinders. Tubes below feed steam into and out of the superheater elements within the flues.

Locomotives fitted with a superheater will usually have a superheater header in the smokebox. Steam enters the header as "wet" (saturated) steam, and then passes through a superheater element. This takes the form of a pipe that runs twice through an enlarged smoke tube in the boiler. The steam exits into a separate chamber in the header as superheated or dry steam. The advantage of superheating is that the steam has greater expansive properties when entering the cylinders, so more power can be gained from a smaller amount of water and fuel.
