= Lempor ejector =

Steam locomotive exhaust system

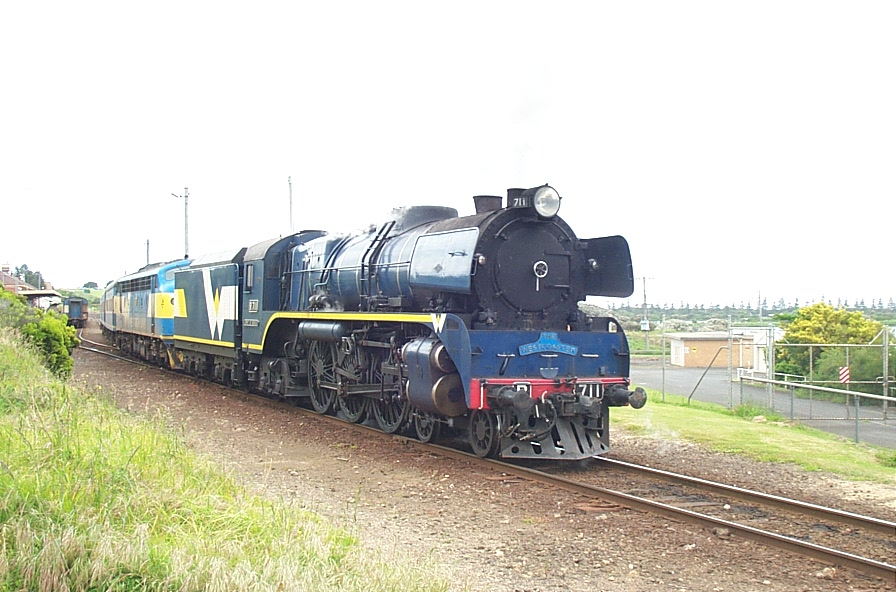
Victorian Railways R class locomotive R 711 was equipped with dual Lempor exhausts in 1998 (since removed).

The Lempor ejector is a steam locomotive exhaust system developed by noted Argentine locomotive engineer Livio Dante Porta. The ejector's name is a portmanteau of the names of Porta and Belgian locomotive engineer Maurice Lemaître. The Lempor ejector follows the principles of the de Laval nozzle.

== Operation ==
In steam locomotives, draft is produced in the firebox by exhausting waste steam from the cylinders into the chimney via a nozzle or 'blast pipe' to create a vacuum in the smokebox. The Lempor ejector is a development of similar multiple orifice/nozzle ejectors which create either a stronger vacuum or the same vacuum more efficiently by having less 'back pressure' or resistance to the exhausting cylinder.

== Results ==
The Lempor exhaust is claimed to deliver a 100% improvement in draughting capacity over traditional exhaust systems and a 40% increase in ejector performance.
