= Ondaine =

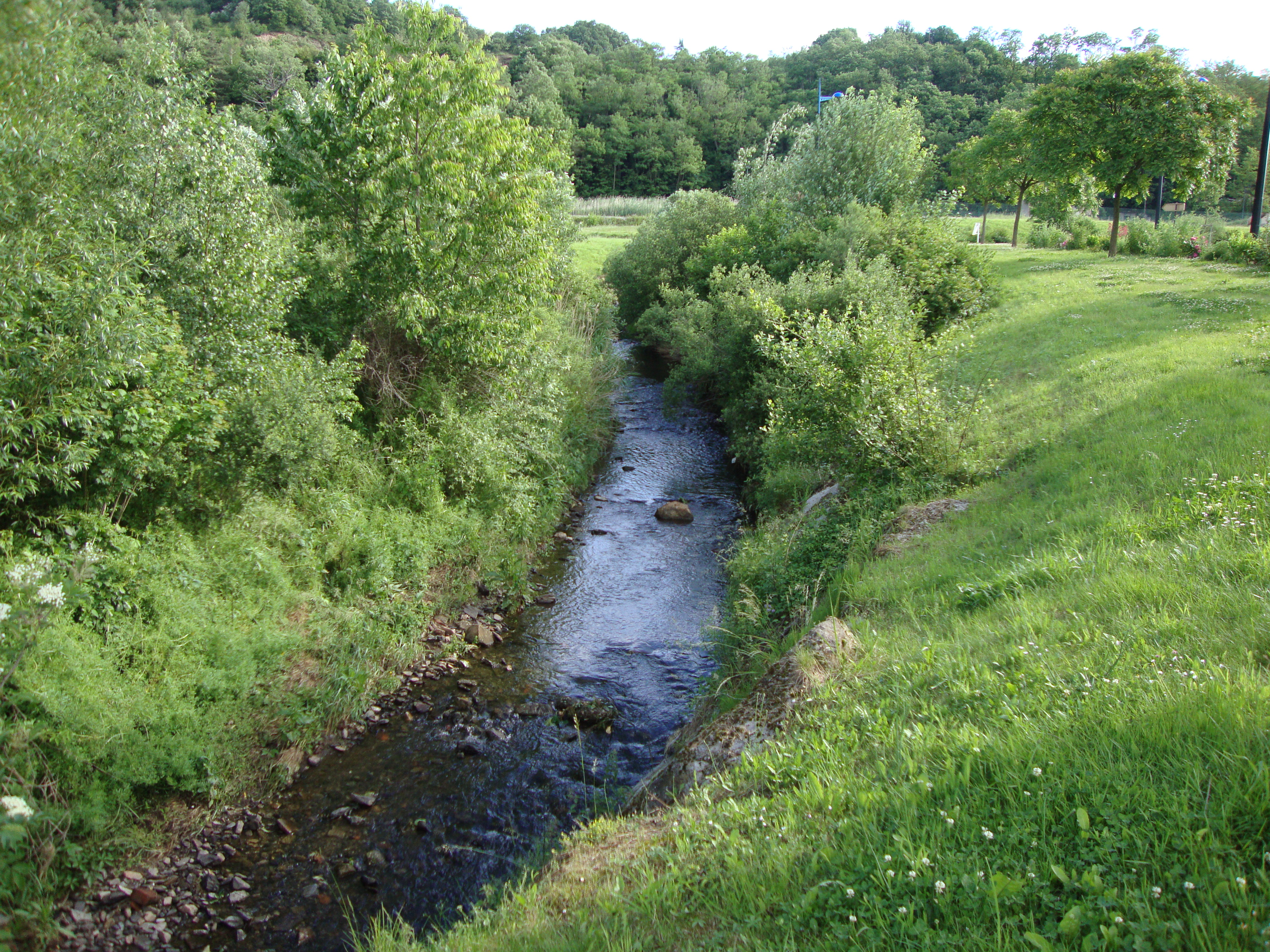
- Ondaine at Le Chambon-Feugerolles

- Location within France Location within Auvergne-Rhône-Alpes

Location
- Country: France

Physical characteristics
- Source
  - location: Planfoy
  - coordinates: 45°22′49″N 4°25′31″E
  - elevation: 1,020 m (3,350 ft)
- Mouth: Loire
  - location: Unieux
  - coordinates: 45°25′03″N 4°14′55″E
  - elevation: 430 m (1,410 ft)
- Length: 18.6 km (11.6 mi)
- Basin size: 125 km^{2} (48 sq mi)

Basin features
- Progression: Loire→ Atlantic Ocean
- Tributaries
  - left: Cotatay, Valchérie, Echapre, Gampille
  - right: Egotay, Borde-Morning

The Ondaine (French pronunciation: [ɔ̃dɛn]) or Ondenon ([ɔ̃dnɔ̃]) is a river in the Loire department of France. It is a right tributary of the Loire.

== Geography ==
The Ondaine has its source in the woods of Neyranche in the commune of Planfoy at an elevation of 1,020 metres (3,350 ft), where it is called the Ondenon. When passing through the town of La Ricamarie it takes the name Ondaine. Its basin covers 122 square kilometres (47 sq mi) mostly in the department of the Loire, but also in part of Haute-Loire.

The Ondaine is one of the rivers of the Loire Valley covered by "river contracts" that are supported by the General Council of the Loire, the Rhône-Alpes region, the Water Agencies, and the State. It flows into the Loire at the locality called Pertuiset in the commune of Unieux at 430 metres (1,410 ft) above sea level opposite Caloire.

== Communes and cantons crossed ==
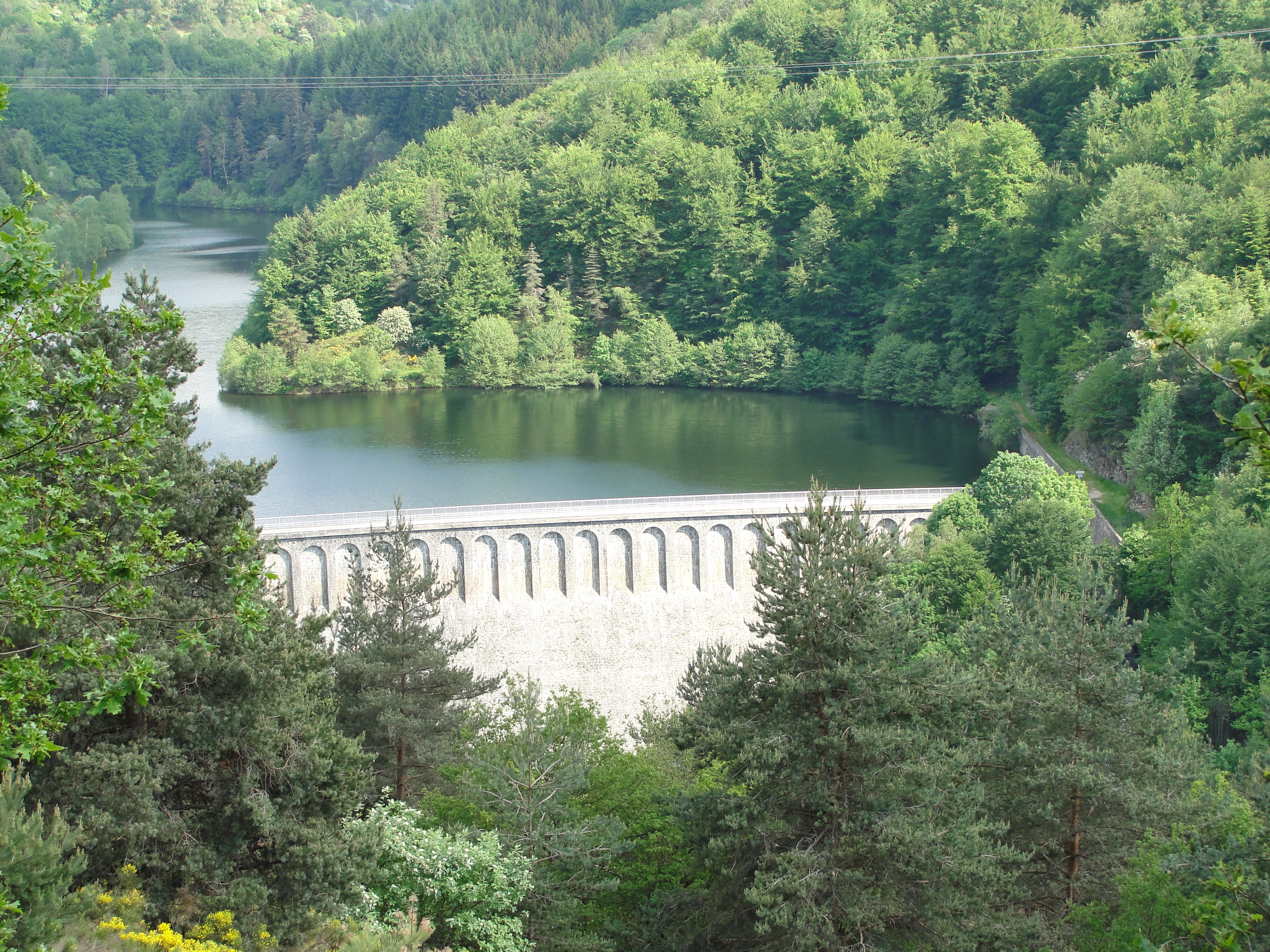
Cotatay Dam

The Ondaine flows through the department of the Loire, passing from upstream to downstream through the communes of Planfoy (source), Saint-Genest-Malifaux, La Ricamarie, Le Chambon-Feugerolles, Firminy, Fraisses, Saint-Paul-en-Cornillon, Unieux (confluence) and Caloire. (Note: SANDRE 2012 adds the communes of Saint-Romain-les-Atheux, Roche-la-Molière and Saint-Étienne) In terms of cantons, The Ondaine rises in the canton of Saint-Genest-Malifaux, passes through or beside the cantons of Le Chambon-Feugerolles, Saint-Genest-Malifaux and the canton of Firminy at its mouth.

== Tributaries ==
The Ondaine has twelve named tributaries of which the seven major tributaries are:

- Cotatay (left) 10.5 km with seven communes and five tributaries referenced.
- Valchérie (left) 10.7 km with five communes and two tributaries referenced.
- Malval (left) 3.7 km with two communes and two tributaries referenced.
- Echapre or Echarpe (left) 9.8 km with six communes and three tributaries referenced.
- Borde-Matin (right) 4.1 km with four communes without tributaries referenced.
- Gampille (left) 12.5 km with seven communes and ten tributaries referenced.
- Egotay (right) 5.9 km with four communes and two tributaries referenced.

== Hydrology and flooding ==
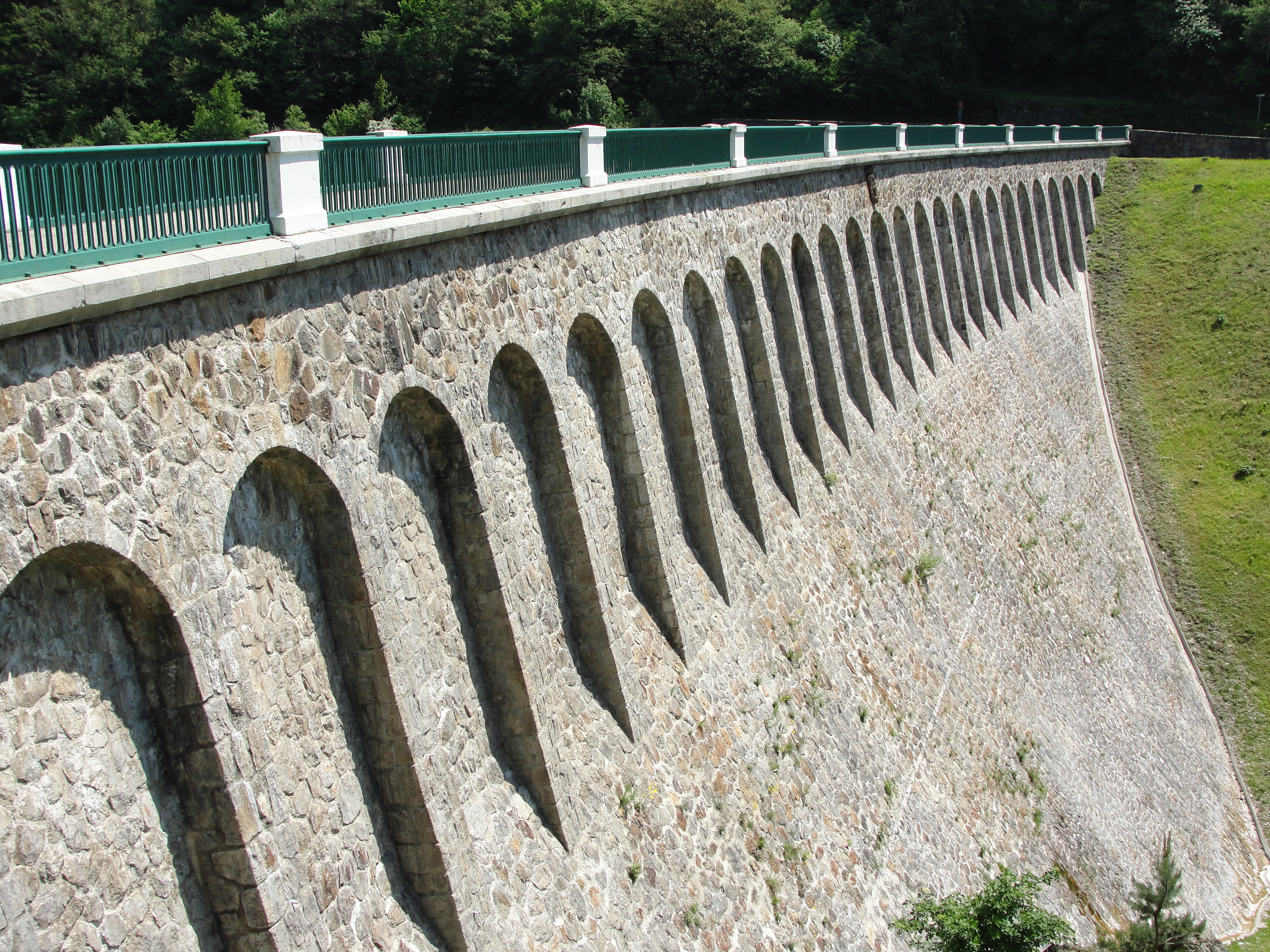
Ondenon Dam

On 5 June 2007 a major flood on the Ondaine and small tributaries upstream caused by major storms flooded part of the city of Le Chambon-Feugerolles and caused extensive damage but no casualties. Despite the rapid nature of the flood (about half an hour), the water rose to 1.7 metres (5 ft 7 in) in some homes. The weather service had issued a warning that storms could be locally strong.

== Facilities and ecology ==
- Ondenon dam
- Cotatay dam
- Treatment plant before the confluence

The river was an open sewer in the late 1990s. It now houses fish species such as brown trout, minnow, gudgeon, sculpin, stone loach, European chub and perch. It is again a first class stream.
