= Canton of Le Chambon-Feugerolles =

Coordinates: 45.4003°N 4.3460°E

Le Chambon-Feugerolles
- Former canton
- Interactive map of Le Chambon-Feugerolles
- Country: France
- Region: Auvergne-Rhône-Alpes
- Department: Loire
- No. of communes: {{{nbcomm}}}
- Disbanded: 2015
- Area: 24.46 km^{2} (9.44 sq mi)
- Population (2012): 20,278
  - Density: 829.0/km^{2} (2,147/sq mi)

The canton of Le Chambon-Feugerolles is a former French administrative division located in the Loire department and the Rhone-Alpes region. It was disbanded following the French canton reorganisation, which came into effect in March 2015. It consisted of two communes, which joined the new canton of Saint-Étienne-2 in 2015. It had 20,278 inhabitants (2012).

The canton comprised the following communes:

- Le Chambon-Feugerolles
- La Ricamarie

== See also ==
- Cantons of the Loire department
