= James Jackson (steelmaker) =

English Manufacturer

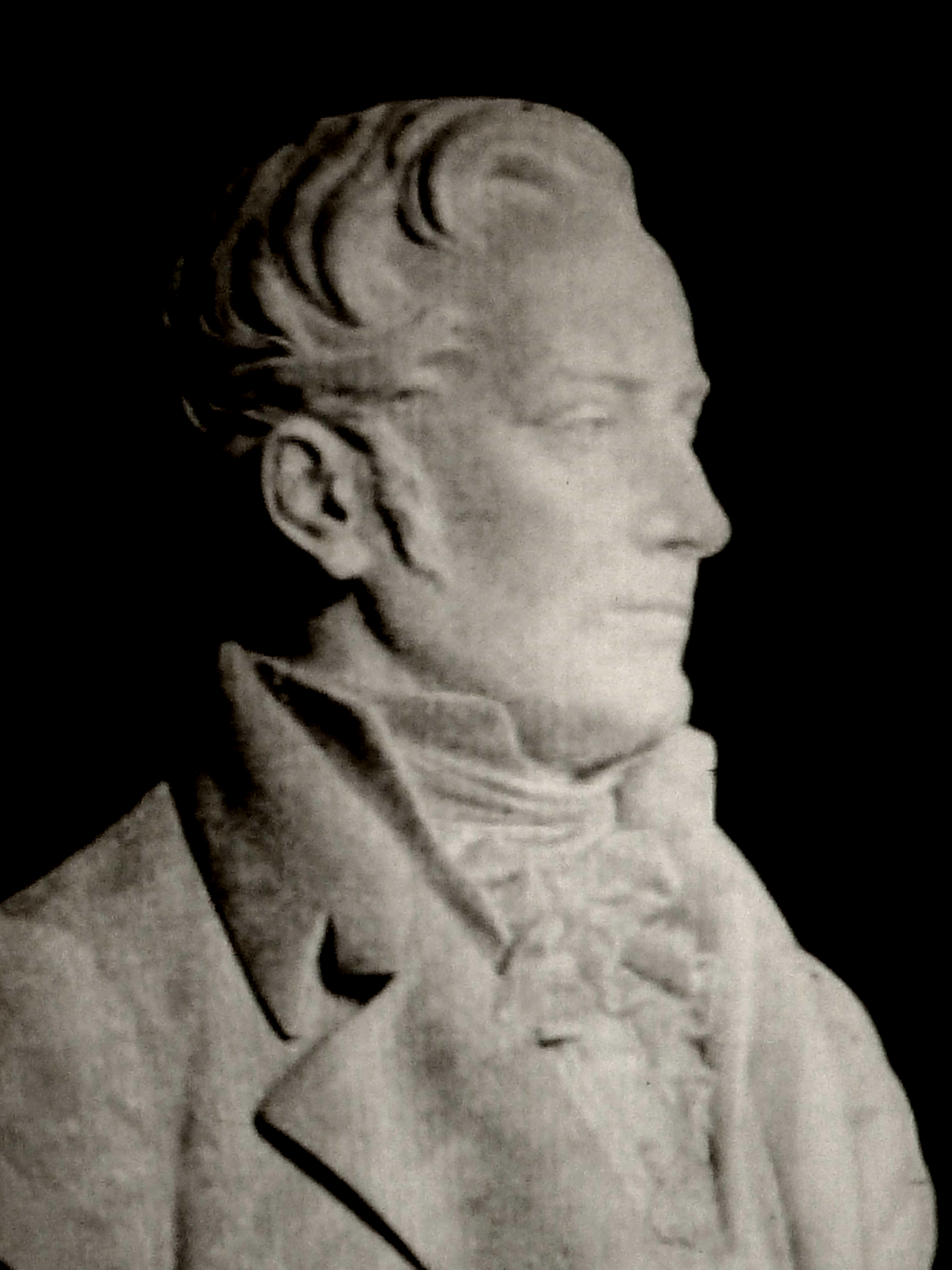
- Bust of James Jackson by Victor fontan
- Born: 14 March 1771; Blackburn, Lancashire, England
- Died: 27 April 1829 (aged 58); Lancaster, Lancashire, England
- Occupation: Steelmaker
- Known for: First steel mill in France

James Jackson (14 March 1771 – 27 April 1829) was an English manufacturer who established the first steel mill in France, near Saint-Étienne, Loire.

== Early years ==
James Jackson was the son of Joseph Jackson (1735-1813), a merchant of Blackburn, Lancashire, who retired to Ribbleton with a modest fortune to become a gentleman farmer. Joseph Jackson married four times. James was the son of his third wife and was born in 1771. When he was 18, he became a clerk with Dilworth and Hargreaves, bankers and traders in Lancaster, Lancashire. He later became involved in monitoring the manufacture of furnaces and forges for ironmaking. The French Revolution began in 1789, to be followed by the Directory and then the empire of Napoleon, which lasted until 1814. For much of this period, Great Britain was at war with France.

In 1793, when aged about 22, Jackson married Elizabeth Eccles Stackhouse, of Giggleswick, Yorkshire. He then went into maritime trade. His sons Joseph (born 1794), William (1796), and James (1798) were born in Lancaster. John was born in 1797 in Preston, just south of Lancaster. The eldest daughter, Ann, was born in 1804 in Manchester, where James Jackson was established in 1800. Between March 1802 and November 1804 he was a partner of John Branch, an auctioneer. His fifth son, Charles, was born in Manchester in October 1805. In November 1806 he was in charge of a cotton mill in Preston, but by January 1807 he was in London.

Around this time Jackson had an income of £1,370, enough to stop trading for a while, although he retained an interest in three ships. In February 1810 he moved to Penzance in Cornwall. Around 1812 he moved to Birmingham and established a factory with two carburizing furnaces and ten furnaces to make steel.

== France ==
It was not known how to produce molten steel in France, so the country was dependent on the United Kingdom. Steel was ten times more expensive in France than in the United Kingdom. Napoleon encouraged the production of steel in the French empire, at Liège, but after his abdication, Liège was no longer part of France. After visiting Paris in June 1814 during the first restoration, Jackson landed at Calais on 25 October 1814. He was then 42 years old. According to a report by Louis de Gallois in 1815, he considered that while steel mills were already numerous in England, he would find little competition in France and could also benefit from low wages. He had a large family, and by his enterprise, he could found a valuable business for them.

The British government confiscated all of Jackson's property in England. Napoleon returned to France. The new regime was favorable to Jackson during the Hundred Days. Jean-Antoine Chaptal, Director of Commerce, supported him. James Jackson chose Saint-Étienne, in the heart of the Loire coal basin, as the location for his forges. He profited from a population familiar with ironworking and from a ready market for his products.

In August 1815 James Jackson set up a steelworks near Saint-Étienne at Trablaine. Trablaine is on the Ondaine, in the town of Le Chambon-Feugerolles. The Trablaine factory started running in 1816. It included carburizing furnaces and crucible furnaces for molten steel. The factory produced molten steel for the first time in France. In August 1818, James Jackson left Trablaine, following a dispute with his partner, which he continued until he filed for bankruptcy in 1821. He moved to Monthieux in 1819 with his sons William, John, James, and Charles, and then in 1820 to Rochetaillée and to Soleil, now Saint-Étienne.

Jackson returned to England around 1823. He died at Lancaster, Lancashire, on 27 April 1829.

== Legacy ==
Jackson's sons, naturalized Frenchmen, established an important steelworks at Assailly in 1830, now in the municipality of Lorette, Loire, on the Gier River. They founded or purchased several companies that produced steel, and participated in companies that used steel, as raw material.

In 1838, William Jackson married Louise Peugeot, and George Peugeot married Anna Jackson. After this double matrimonial union between the Jackson and Peugeot families, they created the company "Peugeot aîné et Jackson frères". They bought mills at Pont-de-Roide and built steel mills where they manufactured products such as saws and umbrella frames. Associated with Pierre-Frédéric Dorian and his stepfather Jacob Holtzer, the Jackson brothers also produced scythes and sickles at Pont-Salomon. In 1859 the company took the name "Dorian, Holtzer, Jackson et Cie."

On 14 November 1854, Jackson Frères and three other companies merged and combined to form the Compagnie des Hauts-fourneaux, forges et aciéries de la Marine et des chemins de fer.

== Famous descendants ==
- Jean Piaget (1896-1980): Swiss psychologist and epistemologist
- Annette Kellermann (1887-1975): Australian swimmer and actress
- Jacques Pitrat (1934-2019): researcher (artificial intelligence)
- Patrice de Maistre (1949): Wealth Manager
- Gilles Leclerc (1952): political reporter
- André Chapelon (1892-1978): engineer who improved the power of steam locomotives
- Jean Hermil (1917-2006): Bishop of Viviers (Ardèche) from 1965 to 1992
- Bertrand Jordan (1939): Molecular Biologist
- Isabelle Demongeot (1966): tennis player
