= Firminy Vert =

Coordinates: 45.383°N 4.287°E

The Maison de la culture à Firminy-Vert

Firminy Vert (lit. "Green Firminy") is group of modern buildings designed by architect Le Corbusier located in Firminy, France in 1964–1969. It includes the Saint-Pierre Church, a stadium, a cultural center, and an Unité d'Habitation. It was designed based on Modernism principles of architecture. It is praised as one of Europe's most accomplished postwar planning exercises.

== Buildings ==
- 1965: Unité d'Habitation of Firminy-Vert, France
- 1965: Maison de la culture de Firminy-Vert
- 1966: Stadium Firminy-Vert
- 1969: Church of Saint-Pierre, Firminy (built posthumously and completed under José Oubrerie's guidance in 2006)
