= Caloire =

Çaloire
- Commune
- Coat of arms
- Location of Çaloire
- Location within France Location within Auvergne-Rhône-Alpes
- Coordinates: 45°25′11″N 4°14′36″E
- Country: France
- Region: Auvergne-Rhône-Alpes
- Department: Loire
- Arrondissement: Saint-Étienne
- Canton: Firminy
- Intercommunality: Saint-Étienne Métropole

Government
  - Mayor (2020–2026): Gilles Boudard
- Area^{1}: 4.7 km^{2} (1.8 sq mi)
- Elevation: 540 m (1,770 ft)
- Highest elevation: 772 m (2,533 ft)
- Lowest elevation: 421 m (1,381 ft)
- Population (2023): 330
  - Density: 70/km^{2} (180/sq mi)
- Time zone: UTC+01:00 (CET)
  - Summer (DST): UTC+02:00 (CEST)
- INSEE/Postal code: 42031 /42240
- ^{1} French Land Register data, which excludes lakes, ponds, glaciers > 1 km^{2} (0.386 sq mi or 247 acres) and river estuaries.

Çaloire (French pronunciation: [salwaʁ]) (Occitan: Çaleire) is a commune in the Loire department in central France.

It is close to the villages of Unieux, Chambles and Saint-Paul-en-Cornillon, and 5 km northwest of Firminy, the largest town in the area.

== Population ==
Historical population
Year	Pop.	±% p.a.
1968	108	—
1975	169	+6.61%
1982	195	+2.07%
1990	227	+1.92%
1999	273	+2.07%
2007	327	+2.28%
2012	347	+1.19%
2017	316	−1.85%
2023	330	+0.73%
Source: INSEE

== See also ==
- Communes of the Loire department
