= Firminy-Vert Stadium =

Sports venue in Firminy, France

Coordinates: 45.3833°N 4.2880°E

Stade de Firminy-Vert
- Location within France
- Address: Firminy

Construction
- Built: 1966
- Architect: le Corbusier

The Firminy-Vert Stadium (French: Stade de Firminy-Vert) is a sport field located at Firminy in the Loire in France.

== Historical ==
The stadium was designed in 1954 by the well known French architect le Corbusier on the site of Firminy-Green in a former quarry.

But the work did not begin until 1966, and ended in 1968 with the completion of the surroundings. Fernand Gardien and André Wogenscky managed the project according to the original plan after the death of Le Corbusier in 1966. It is classified a historical monument.

== Presentation ==
In the initial project the architect intended a stadium of 3,000 to 5,000 places, of which 1,000 were covered. The stadium holds today only 3,800 including 500 covered seats.

Access to the stadium for the spectators is by the boulevard which provides access to the top bleachers. The terraces face the House of Culture and the rear of St. Peter's Church, making a set.

The City Council is planning the renovation of the stadium and to finish the original project by providing 1,000 covered places.
