= André Chapelon =

French mechanical engineer (1892–1978)

- Born: 26 October 1892; Saint-Paul-en-Cornillon, Loire, France
- Died: 22 July 1978 (aged 85)
- Education: École Centrale Paris
- Relatives: James Jackson (great grandfather)

André Chapelon (26 October 1892 – 22 July 1978) was a French mechanical engineer and designer of advanced steam locomotives. A graduate engineer of Ecole Centrale Paris, he was one of very few locomotive designers who brought a rigorous scientific method to their design, and he sought to apply up-to-date theories and knowledge in subjects such as thermodynamics, and gas and fluid flow. Chapelon's work was an early example of what would later be called modern steam, and influenced the work of many later designers of those locomotives, such as Livio Dante Porta.

== Life and career ==
André Xavier Chapelon was born in Saint-Paul-en-Cornillon, Loire, France on 26 October 1892. According to family relatives, his great-grandfather James Jackson immigrated to France from England in 1812, one of many who came to France in the 19th century to teach steel production methods. He achieved a distinction in mathematics and science, and served as an artillery officer during World War I before returning to the École Centrale Paris in 1919, from which he graduated as Ingénieur des Arts et Manufactures in 1921. He joined the Chemins de fer de Paris à Lyon et à la Méditerranée (PLM) as a probationer in the Rolling Stock and Motive Power section at Lyon-Mouche depot. However, foreseeing poor prospects, he left in 1924 and joined the Société Industrielle des Telephones, soon becoming as assistant manager. In 1925, he joined the Chemin de Fer de Paris à Orléans (PO) and, along with Finnish Engineer Kyösti Kylälä, jointly designed the Kylchap exhaust system. While his principles met with scepticism, No. 3566, the first locomotive rebuilt to Chapelon's design, was an outstanding success, and from 1929 to 1936 several other locomotives were rebuilt to Chapelon's designs.

In 1934, Chapelon was appointed Chevalier of the Legion of Honour and awarded both the Plumey Prize of the Académie des Sciences and the Gold Medal of the Société d'Encouragement pour l'Industrie Nationale. From 1938 he published the book for which he is most noted La locomotive à vapeur.

On 13 September 1971 Chapelon was made Vice-President of the Stephenson Locomotive Society in a ceremony in Paris.

== Chapelon's methods ==
He tested his experimental designs thoroughly to understand how they actually behaved, using the most accurate and complete testing and sensing equipment available, such as high-speed stroboscopic photography to watch steam flow.

Before Chapelon, few engineers and designers tried to understand why a certain design worked better than another—they merely worked by trial and error, trying to replicate the attributes of previous locomotives by rule of thumb, by guesswork, and from empirical theories and design rules that had rarely been given adequate testing.

=== Efficiency ===
Efficiency was one of Chapelon's primary concerns in design. Some of his locomotives exceeded 12% efficiency, which for a steam locomotive was exceptional. With greater efficiency, Chapelon could achieve greater power in a smaller locomotive that burned less coal, rather than simply enlarging a locomotive for more power.

=== Compounding and steam flow ===
He was a major proponent of the compound locomotive, and from 1929 on he rebuilt many de Glehn compounds, designed by Alfred de Glehn, with his system of compounding. His other major work included optimising the steam circuit, including improving the steam flow by widening steam passages and paths, improving the flow through valve gear, and improved exhaust systems such as his Kylchap exhaust.

=== Wheel and rail ===
Chapelon realised that in order to produce an efficient, powerful locomotive, every aspect of it had to be improved and dealt with scientifically. He studied locomotive behaviour at speed and the riding properties of the steel wheel on steel rail; his knowledge was put to use much later on the French TGV high speed trains.

== Problems ==
Despite his abilities and track record, he was never presented the opportunity to design a class of entirely-new locomotives that were produced in any numbers. He was continually stymied by railway management and politicians, and often his superbly performing locomotives were treated as embarrassments by his superiors, because they showed up the poor performance of the officially-approved locomotives.

== Chapelon's legacy ==
Chapelon's work lived on in the work of his friend and protégé Livio Dante Porta of Argentina, and others, and he was accorded the rare honour for a foreign railwayman of having a British Rail Class 86 electric locomotive named for him.

Although many of Chapelon's contemporaries did not adopt his methods, one of the few notable designers that did was Sir Nigel Gresley of the British London and North Eastern Railway, who experimentally used Chapelon's Kylchap exhaust system on a small number of LNER Class A4 locomotives, including the LNER Class A4 4468 Mallard, which set what most historians accept as the world record for speed for steam locomotives in 1938.

Czech locomotive designers at the Škoda Works watched Chapelon's work, consulting him during the construction of the ČSD class 476.0 locomotive, the last compound locomotive of Czech origin.

Chapelon published numerous works on steam locomotive design, although only his most famous work (La locomotive a vapeur, described above) has been translated into English.

== Chapelon's locomotives ==
=== French locomotives ===
The first locomotive rebuilt to incorporate Chapelon's work was PO 4-6-2 3566, which was released from Tours works in November 1929. As a result of this, three further series of Pacifics were similarly modified.

This was followed by a more comprehensive rebuild of Pacific 4521 as a 4-8-0, which was completed in August 1932. The success of that work led to eleven more rebuilds to locomotives numbered 4701-4712 (later 240 701 - 240 712). Those locomotives produced almost 40 ihp (30 kW) continuous per metric ton locomotive weight, which possibly still is a world record.

In 1936, Chapelon began the rebuild of a PO 6000 class 2-10-0 as a 2-12-0, with two high-pressure cylinders between the 2nd and 3rd coupled axles mounted behind four low-pressure cylinders. That unusual cylinder arrangement was required due to the loading gauge being too narrow to accommodate two low-pressure cylinders with the required volume to fully expand the low-pressure steam. There was also an additional level of "superheat" between the high- and low-pressure cylinders, allowing the loco to achieve a tractive effort of 83,700 lbf (372 kN).

The 242 A 1 was perhaps the pinnacle of Chapelon's development of the steam locomotive. The 4-8-4 was a rebuild of Etat 4-8-2 241.101, which retained the 3-cylinder layout, changed it into a 3-cylinder compound system, and introduced more of Chapelon's improvements, including a triple Kylchap exhaust, double high-pressure valves and Willoteaux valves on the low-pressure cylinders. Completed in 1946 and with a continuous power output of 5,500 ihp (4,100 kW), the locomotive was somewhat more powerful than contemporary French electric locomotives, resulting in the latter being quickly redesigned with a 1,000 hp (750 kW) increase in power. However, the locomotive was scrapped in 1960.

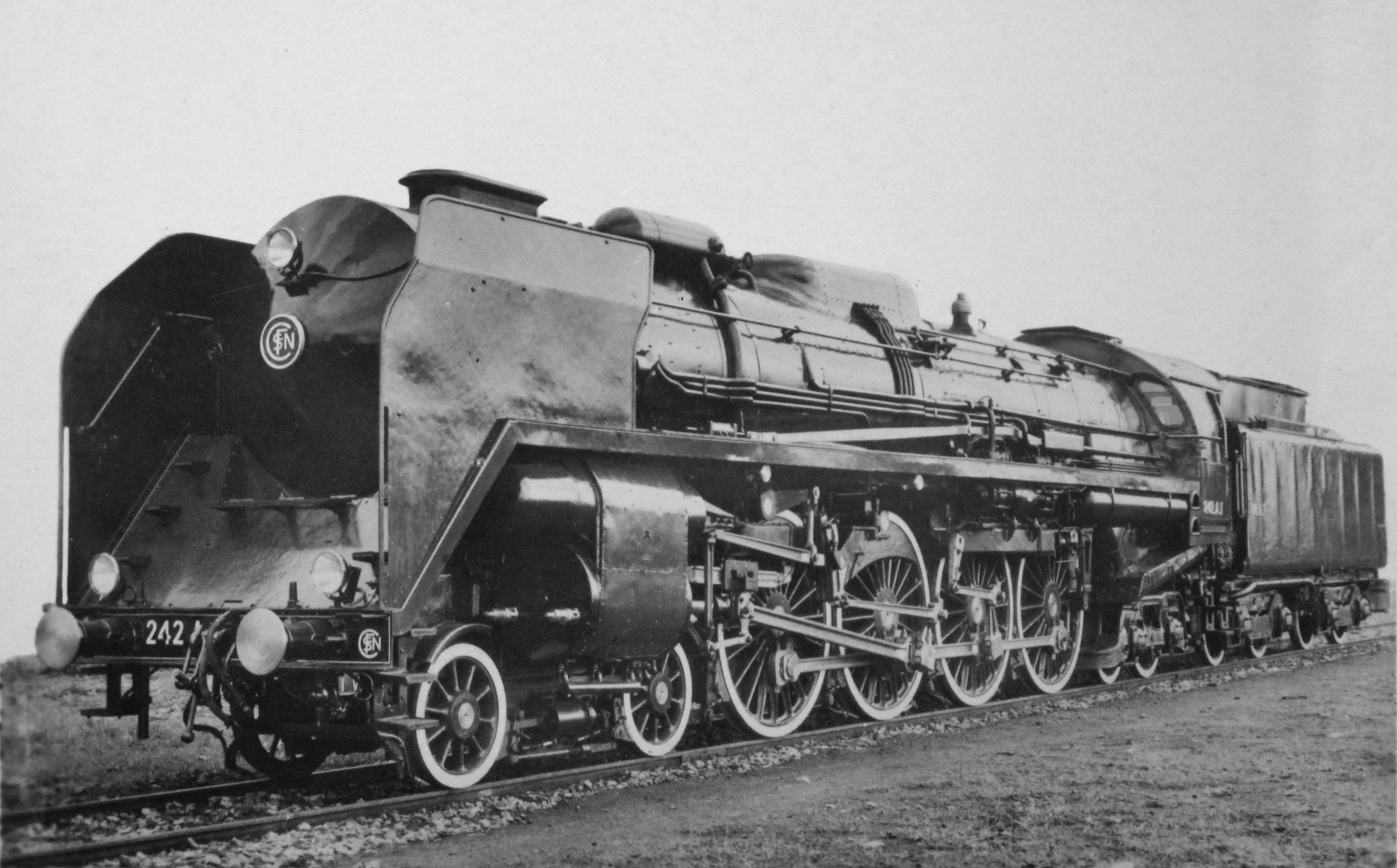
SNCF Class 242 A1

The SNCF 240P class is considered by some to be among Chapelon's best designs, and was the most thermally-efficient locomotive in the world at its time.

=== Exported locomotives ===
The only locomotives Chapelon designed for use outside France were some metre gauge 2-8-4 and 4-8-4 locomotives for GELSA (Groupement d'Exportation de Locomotives S.A.) for export to Brazil. They were highly advanced locomotives with many modern American appliances, as well as Chapelon's innovations. He was a great admirer of American industrial capacities and the resulting high quality of its engineering, even though his work tended to be largely ignored by the USA (as it did with European thermodynamic refinements as a whole).

=== Proposed designs ===
Chapelon had several designs of standardised locomotive on the drawing board, starting with his time at P.O.Midi. Entirely new designs were drawn following his exposure to American ideas, with a visit to the American Locomotive Company (ALCO) works in Schenectady, New York, and after experience with the operating characteristics of 242A1 became known. They were planned to be 3-cylinder Sauvage compound locomotives, with a large, 6 m^{2} (65 ft^{2}) grate area, for duties that required high horsepower, and were to be complemented by 2-cylinder simple expansion 2-8-0 and 2-10-0 designs for less-demanding duties.

The 152 (2-10-4) locomotive design had two frames partially constructed, before the decision was made to electrify the SNCF and phase out steam. As a result, the frames were scrapped before completion.

== See also ==
- Advanced steam technology
