= Chrome steel =

Chromium-containing steel alloy

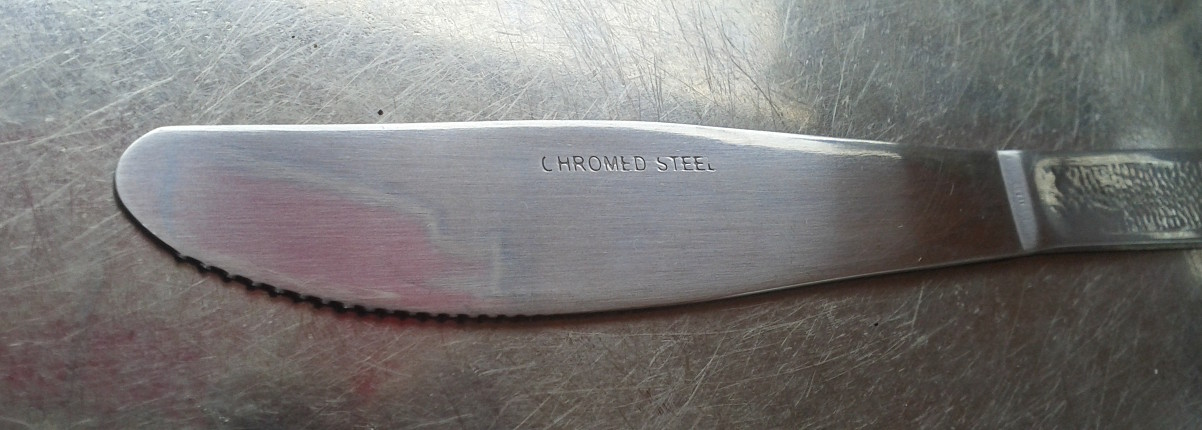
Chrome steel knife

Chrome steel is the name for any one of a class of non-stainless steels such as AISI 52100, SUJ2, 100Cr6, En31, 100C6, and DIN 5401 which are used for applications such as bearings, tools, drills and utensils. Like stainless steel, chrome steels contain chromium, but do not have the corrosion-resistant properties of stainless steel.

== History ==
The first known deliberate addition of chromium during steelmaking is from the 11th-century Iran (Persia).

The modern chrome steel has been made from ferrochrome since it was developed around 1877 by J. B. Boussingault and Henri Aimé Brustlein of Jacob Holtzer steelworks in Unieux, France.
