= SNCF 240P =

SNCF 4-240A
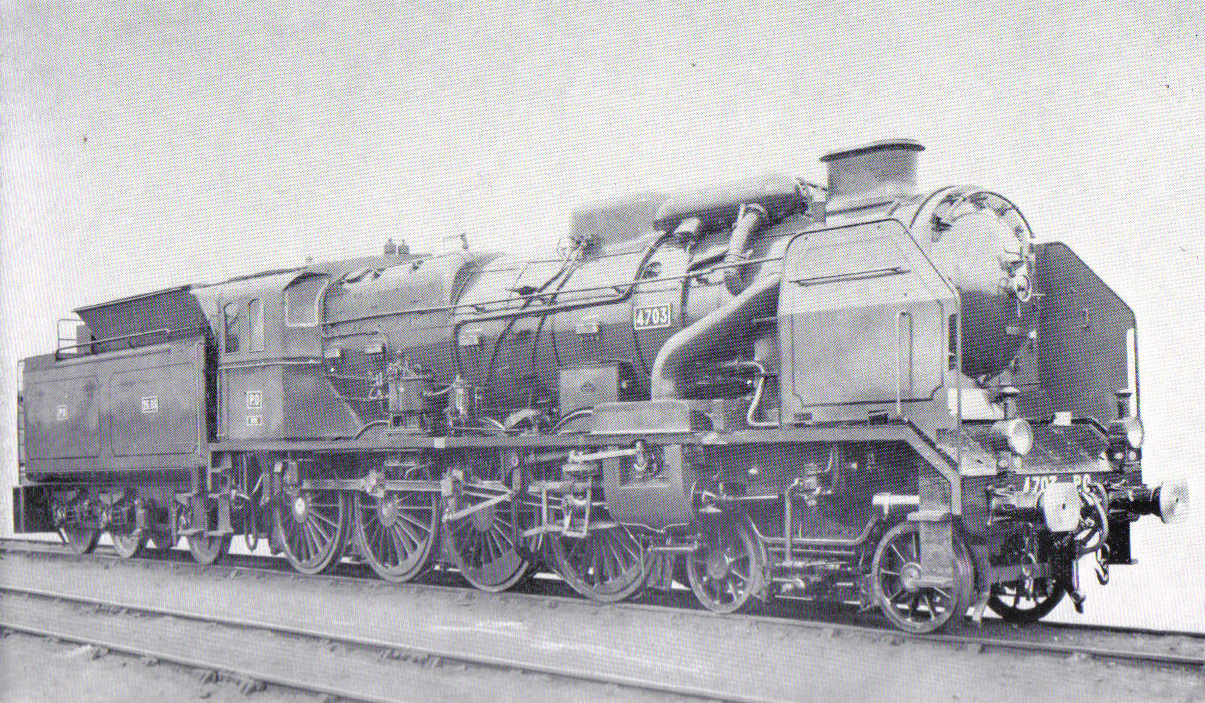
- #4703, the third 4-240A, during the PO days.
Type and origin
- Power type: Steam
- Designer: André Chapelon
Specifications
- Configuration
  - Whyte: 4-8-0
  - UIC: 2′D h4v
- Driver dia.: 1,900 mm (74.80 in)
- Length: 20.79 m (68 ft 3 in)
- Axle load: 20 t (19.7 long tons; 22.0 short tons)
- Adhesive weight: 80.5 t (79.2 long tons; 88.7 short tons)
- Loco weight: 136.5 t (134.3 long tons; 150.5 short tons)
- Tender cap.: 12 t (11.8 long tons; 13.2 short tons) coal 34,000 L (7,500 imp gal; 9,000 US gal)
- Firebox
  - Grate area: 3.75 m^{2} (40.4 sq ft)
- Boiler pressure: 2.00 MPa (290 psi)
- Heating surface: 213 m^{2} (2,290 sq ft)
- Superheater
  - Heating area: 68 m^{2} (730 sq ft)
- High-pressure cylinder: 420 mm × 650 mm (16.535 in × 25.591 in)
- Low-pressure cylinder: 650 mm × 690 mm (25.591 in × 27.165 in)
Performance figures
- Power output: 4,000 hp (3.0 MW)
- Tractive effort: 260.40 kN (58,540 lbf) "starting" mode, 207.61 kN (46,670 lbf) normal compound mode

The SNCF 4-240A class and SNCF 5-240P class was a group of thirty-seven 4-8-0 steam locomotives designed by André Chapelon.

The engines started life as Chemin de Fer de Paris à Orléans (Paris-Orleans Railway) 4500 class 4-6-2s before being rebuilt. The first of the conversions took place in 1932. The new boiler with the long, narrow Belpaire firebox came from the Nord "Super Pacifics". With all the pipes, domes, and pumps, these were double-chimneyed, husky looking locomotives of very different appearance than the Pacifics.

By using superheated steam and compounding, these locomotives achieved remarkably high thermal efficiencies, in some cases as high as 12.8%. (Note: Although high for a railway locomotive, this efficiency was much lower than that of contemporary steam turbine electric power stations, which used higher pressures and temperatures to achieve thermal efficiencies above 34%.)

== Use ==
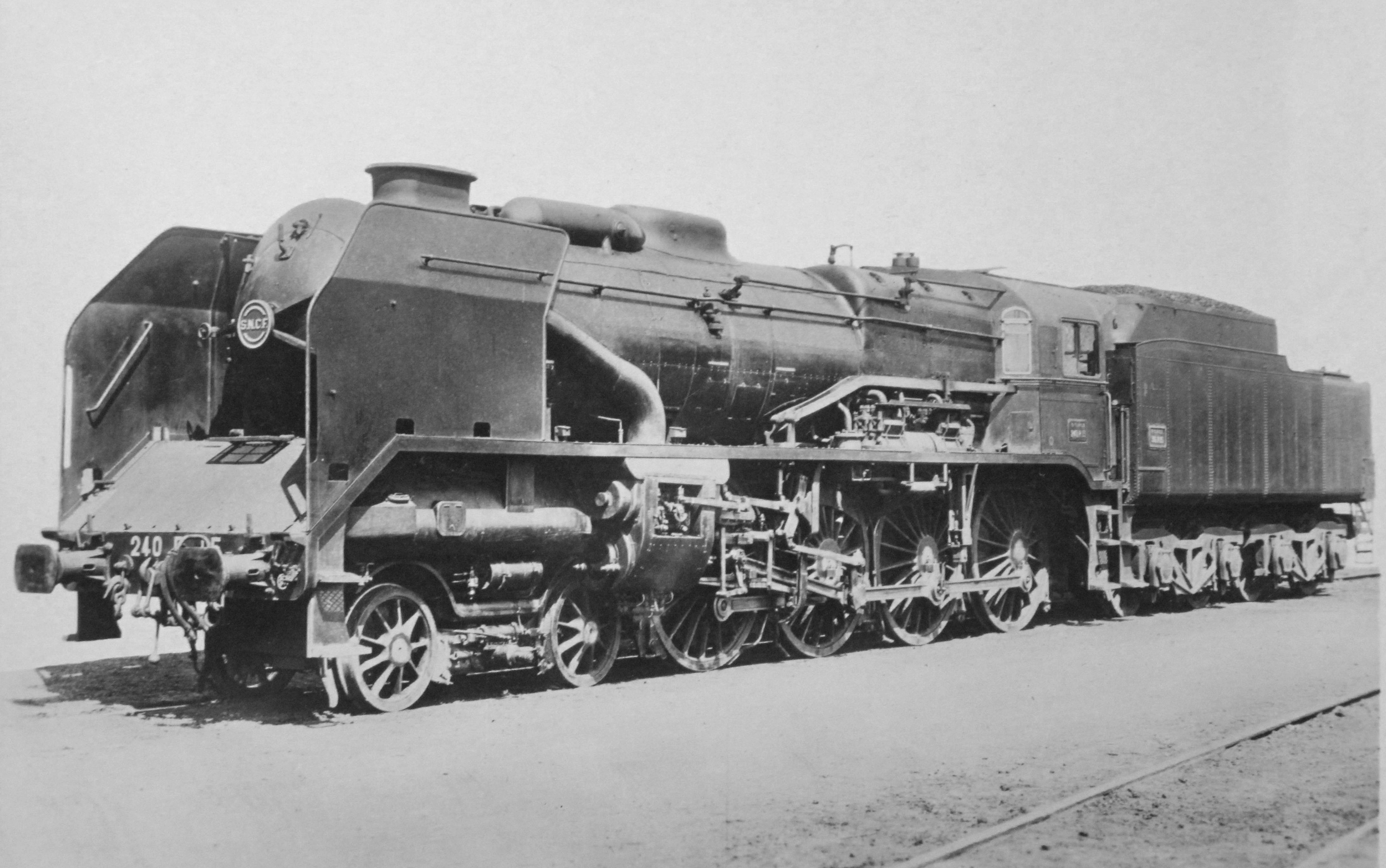
A later SNCF 5-240P. These had the larger bogie tenders and longer smoke deflectors.

=== 4-240A ===
SNCF south-west.

These twelve 4-8-0s were created to tackle the 1 in 100 gradients of the Brive to Montauban division of the line from Paris to Toulouse. For their time, these were extremely powerful locomotives, capable of maintaining 4,000 hp (3.0 MW) at 70 mph (110 km/h). The 240As were also highly versatile, being used on both passenger and freight trains.

=== 5-240P ===
SNCF south-east.

These twenty‑five 4‑8‑0 locomotives were built by 1940 and were used for passenger and fast freight services on the Laroche-Dijon-Paris line. They featured larger low‑pressure cylinders than the preceding 240.As, along with the addition of mechanical stokers. All were withdrawn by 1950 when the route was electrified.

== Bibliography ==
- Hollingsworth, Brian; Arthur F. Cook (1996) [1987]. The Great Book of Trains. Salamander Books Ltd. ISBN 0-517-18462-1.
- Hollingsworth, Brian (2000). The Illustrated Dictionary of Trains of the World. London: Salamander Books Ltd. pp. 118–121. ISBN 1-84065-177-6.
