= Marcel Thibaud =

French politician

Marcel Thibaud (22 September 1896 in Unieux – 1 July 1985) was a French politician. He represented the French Communist Party in the National Assembly from 1956 to 1958.
