= 2-12-0 =

Locomotive wheel arrangement

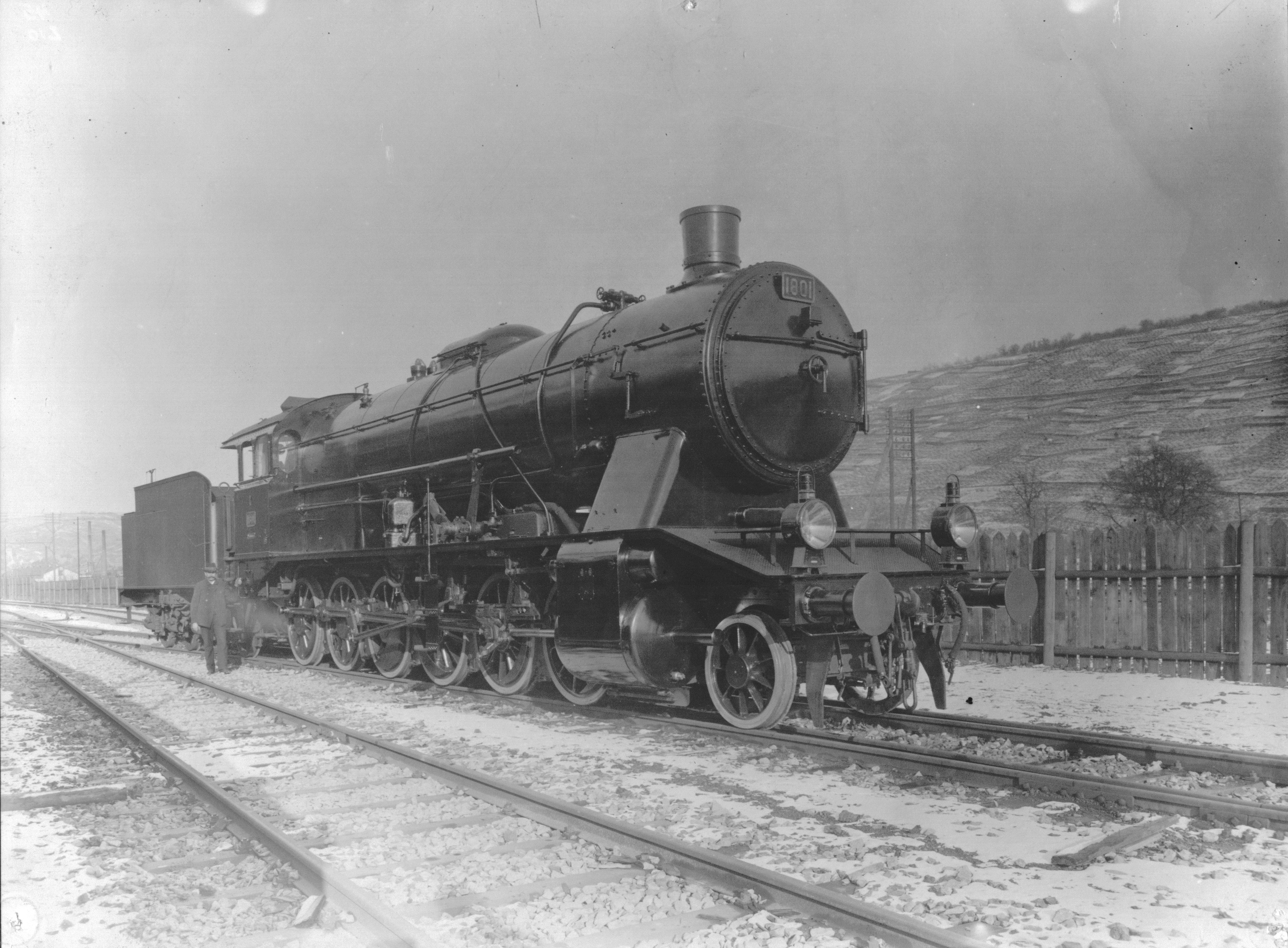
A Württemberg K locomotive, an example of this wheel arrangement.

Under the Whyte notation for the classification of steam locomotives, 2-12-0 represents the wheel arrangement of two leading wheels on one axle (usually in a leading truck), twelve powered and coupled driving wheels on six axles, and no trailing wheels.

== Equivalent classifications ==
Other equivalent classifications are:

- UIC classification: 1F (also known as German classification and Italian classification)
- French classification: 160
- Turkish classification: 67
- Swiss classification: 6/7

== Germany ==
While standard German freight train steam locomotives were 2-10-0 types, between 1917 and 1924 the Esslingen locomotive works produced 44 units of the so-called Class K for the Royal Württemberg State Railways (later renumbered to class 59 by the Deutsche Reichsbahn). With a top speed of only 60 km/h these locomotives were designed for heavy duty in mountainous areas such as the Geislinger Steige, with special attention on low load per axle (16 t). During World War II, after electrification of that line the units were used on the Semmering railway in Austria, then part of the German Reich. The last four units were in service until 1957.

== France ==
The Paris-Orleans railway made a compound demonstrator (160-A1) under the orders of André Chapelon which used a six-cylinder, double expansión configuration with 'resuperheat'.

== Other ==
Other 2-12-0s were built for the Austrian State Railways in 1912.
