= World Architecture Survey =

Contemporary architecture survey

The World Architecture Survey was conducted in 2010 by Vanity Fair, to determine the most important works of contemporary architecture. 52 leading architects, teachers, and critics, including several Pritzker Prize winners and deans of major architecture schools were asked for their opinion.

The survey asked two questions:

1. What are the five most important buildings, bridges, or monuments constructed since 1980?
2. What is the greatest work of architecture thus far in the 21st century?

While the range of responses was very broad, more than half of the experts surveyed named the Guggenheim Museum Bilbao by Frank Gehry as one of the most important works since 1980. The Beijing National Stadium (Bird’s Nest stadium) in Beijing by Herzog and de Meuron was the building most often cited, by seven respondents, as the most significant structure of the 21st century so far. Counted by architect, works by Frank Gehry received the most votes, followed by those of Rem Koolhaas. The result of the survey led Vanity Fair to label Gehry as "the most important architect of our age".

== Results ==
=== Most important works since 1980 ===
The respondents named a total of 132 different structures when asked to indicate the five most important buildings, monuments, and bridges completed since 1980. The top 21 were:

1. Guggenheim Museum Bilbao (completed 1997) in Bilbao, Spain by Frank Gehry (28 votes)
2. Menil Collection (1987) in Houston, Texas by Renzo Piano (10 votes)
3. Thermal Baths of Vals (1996) in Vals, Switzerland by Peter Zumthor (9 votes)
4. Hong Kong Shanghai Bank (HSBC) Building (1985) in Hong Kong by Norman Foster (7 votes)
5. Tied (6 votes):
  Seattle Central Library (2004) in Seattle by Rem Koolhaas
  Sendai Mediatheque (2001) in Sendai, Japan by Toyo Ito
  Neue Staatsgalerie (1984) in Stuttgart, Germany by James Stirling
  Church of the Light (1989) in Osaka, Japan by Tadao Ando
6. Vietnam Veterans Memorial (1982) in Washington, D.C. by Maya Lin (5 votes)
7. Tied (4 votes):
  Millau Viaduct (2004) in France by Norman Foster
  Jewish Museum, Berlin (1998) in Berlin by Daniel Libeskind
8. Tied (3 votes):
  Lloyd’s Building (1984) in London by Richard Rogers
  Beijing National Stadium (2008) in Beijing by Jacques Herzog and Pierre de Meuron
  CCTV Building (under construction as of 2010) in Beijing by Rem Koolhaas
  Casa da Musica (2005) in Porto, Portugal by Rem Koolhaas
  Cartier Foundation (1994) in Paris by Jean Nouvel
  BMW Welt (2007) in Munich by COOP Himmelblau
  Addition to the Nelson-Atkins Museum (2007) in Kansas City, Missouri by Steven Holl
  Cooper Union building (2009) in New York by Thom Mayne
  Parc de la Villette (1984) in Paris by Bernard Tschumi
  Yokohama International Passenger Terminal (2002) at Ōsanbashi Pier in Yokohama, Japan by Foreign Office Architects
9. Saint-Pierre church, Firminy (2006) in Firminy, France by Le Corbusier (2 votes)

=== Most significant work of the 21st century ===
The buildings most often named as the greatest work of architecture thus far in the 21st century were:

1. Beijing National Stadium by Herzog and de Meuron (7 votes)
2. Saint-Pierre, Firminy by Le Corbusier (4 votes)
3. Seattle Central Library by Rem Koolhaas (3 votes)
4. CCTV Headquarters by Rem Koolhaas (2 votes)
5. Tied with one vote each: Sendai Mediatheque (Toyo Ito), Millau Viaduct (Norman Foster), Casa da Musica (Rem Koolhaas), Cartier Foundation (Jean Nouvel), BMW Welt (COOP Himmelblau)

== Criticism ==
Writing for the Chicago Tribune, Blair Kamin criticized the "self-aggrandizing" survey for not including any green buildings. In response, Lance Hosey of Architect magazine conducted an alternate survey of leading green building experts and found that no buildings appeared on both lists, suggesting that standards of "good design" and "green design" are misaligned. Commentators also noted that several of the architects surveyed (but not Gehry) "perhaps took the magazine’s title a little too seriously" and voted for their own buildings.

== Participants ==
The following people replied to the survey:

- Stan Allen
- Tadao Ando
- George Baird
- Deborah Berke
- David Chipperfield
- Neil Denari
- Hank Dittmar
- Roger Duffy
- Peter Eisenman
- Martin Filler
- Norman Foster
- Kenneth B. Frampton
- Frank Gehry
- Richard Gluckman
- Paul Goldberger
- Michael Graves
- Zaha Hadid
- Hugh Hardy
- Steven Holl
- Hans Hollein
- Michael Holzer
- Michael Jemtrud
- Charles Jencks
- Leon Krier
- Daniel Libeskind
- Thom Mayne
- Richard Meier
- José Rafael Moneo
- Eric Owen Moss
- Mohsen Mostafavi
- Victoria Newhouse
- Jean Nouvel
- Richard Olcott
- John Pawson
- Cesar Pelli
- James Stewart Polshek
- Christian de Portzamparc
- Antoine Predock
- Wolf D. Prix
- Jaquelin T. Robertson
- Richard Rogers
- Joseph Rykwert
- Ricardo Scofidio
- Annabelle Selldorf
- Robert Siegel
- John Silber
- Brett Steele
- Bernard Tschumi
- Renzo Piano
- Ben van Berkel
- Anthony Vidler
- Rafael Viñoly
- Tod Williams and Billie Tsien

== See also ==
- Architectural icon
