= Canton of Firminy =

Coordinates: 45.4008°N 4.2571°E

Firminy
- Canton
- Country: France
- Region: Auvergne-Rhône-Alpes
- Department: Loire
- No. of communes: {{{nbcomm}}}
- Area: 32.08 km^{2} (12.39 sq mi)
- Population (2023): 31,128
  - Density: 970.3/km^{2} (2,513/sq mi)
- INSEE code: 42 06

The canton of Firminy is a French administrative division located in the department of Loire and the Auvergne-Rhône-Alpes region. It includes the following communes:

- Caloire
- Firminy
- Fraisses
- Saint-Paul-en-Cornillon
- Unieux

== See also ==
- Cantons of the Loire department
