= Maurice Debesse =

- Born: 19 November 1903; Firminy
- Died: 18 July 1998 (aged 94); Archamps
- Occupation: Educator

Maurice Debesse (1903–1998) was a French educator.
