= Unité d'Habitation of Firminy-Vert =

French historical monument

Coordinates: 45.3780°N 4.2813°E

The Unité d'Habitation of Firminy-Vert is a residential building located in Firminy in the Loire department in France, by the French-Swiss architect Le Corbusier according to his Unité d'habitation model.

== History ==
In the 1950s, the city's demographic forecasts predicted a rapid increase in population to 50,000. Le Corbusier was asked to design three housing units comprising 3,500 housing units on the heights of the town of Firminy-Vert and a shopping center at their foot. But the city's population stagnated at around 25,000. It was therefore decided not to build the other two units (also because of the lack of aesthetics considered too imposing by the population)

Work began in 1965, at the same time as the inauguration of the Maison de la Culture de Firminy. Le Corbusier died the same year and was replaced by his disciple André Wogenscky who inaugurated the building in 1967. Out of 414 dwellings, a maximum of 320 occupied apartments was reached around 1973.

In the 1980s, the building was no longer appreciated by its population and many families moved into single-family homes. As the building was emptying more and more, it was decided to close the northern part and to repatriate the inhabitants to the southern part in order to reduce operating deficits. Until 2003 it will remain the only housing unit to be managed by the public office of HLM, and to allow the reopening of the closed part it was decided to sell the duplexes in co-ownership.

In August 2012, the school, on the top floor, was renovated and an Erasmus Mundus MaCLands Masters course (professions in Heritage and Management of Unesco cultural landscapes) from Jean Monnet University settled there.

In the summer of 2026, a series of heatwaves led to temperatures inside the apartments regularly exceeding 35 °C (95 °F), and in some cases exceeding 40 °C (104 °F). Building restrictions, intended to preserve the historic structures's design, limit the residents' options to protect themselves from the heat, for example preventing the installation of shutters.

== Presentation ==
The building, 130 meters long, 21 meters wide and 51 meters high, oriented on a north–south axis, is located on the peak of Massaridier. It was built with four times less budget than the Cité radieuse in Marseille which was commissioned by the French state, which resulted in compromises with Le Corbusier. For example, a surface parking lot was installed when it was planned to be underground, less insulation materials were used, and the finishes are sketchy; for example the rooftop swimming pool is not tiled.

It comprises 17 levels served by seven "storey" streets comprising 414 duplex apartments, making the unit the largest of the five existing in the world, with a total area of 27,859 m 2 . The duplexes range from T2 to T6 and have a double exposure to the sun thanks to a through design. The measurements of the apartments are derived from the Modulor calculations : the basic module has a height of 2.26 m and a width of 1.83 m .

A post office box is also located within the housing unit.

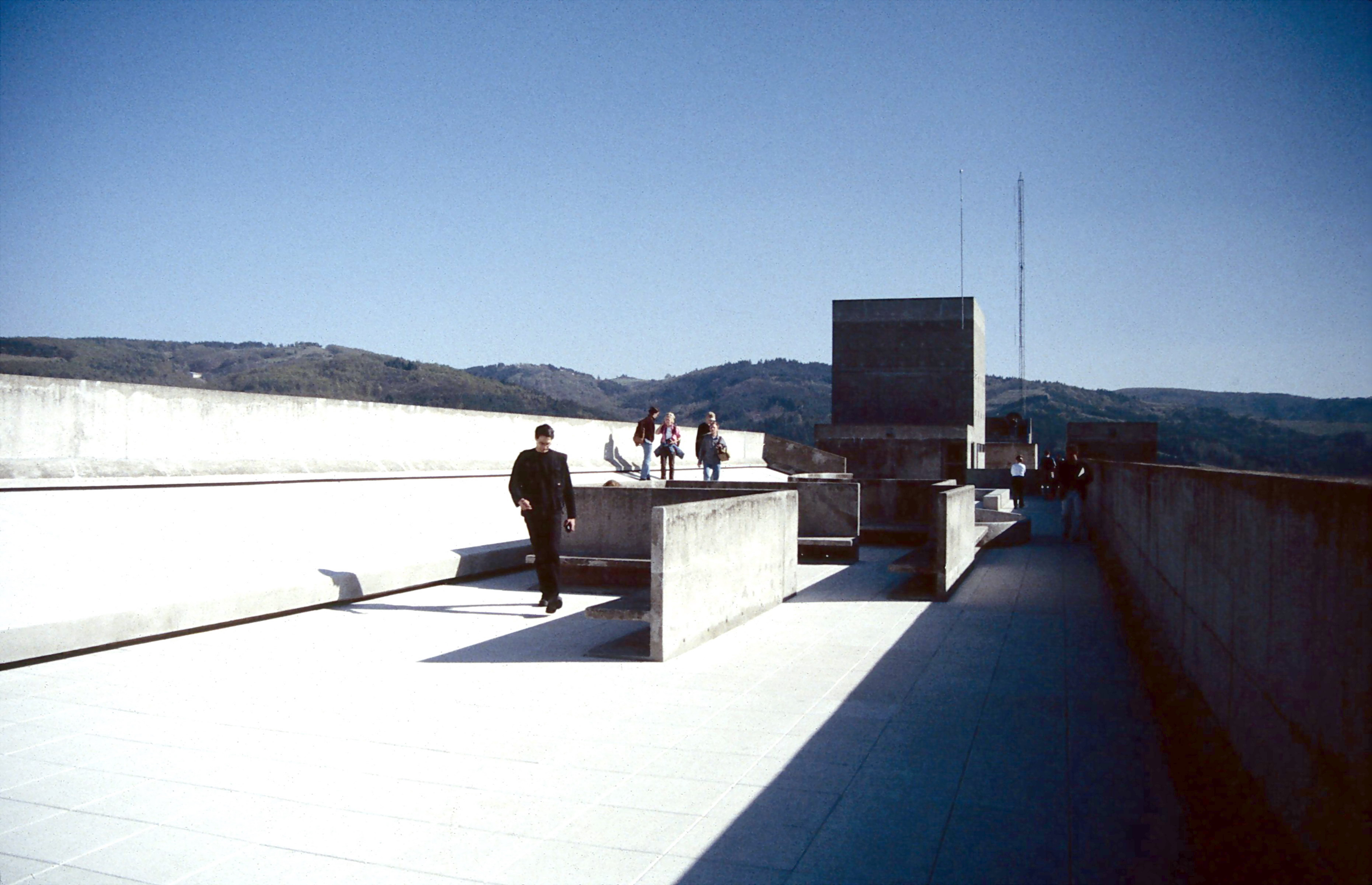
Roof Garden of the Unité in Firminy, 1997

At the top, on a terrace, is a nursery school. It occupies the entire length of the building on two levels. It is made up of eight classes designed to accommodate children from the three housing units initially planned. It remained open for about thirty years until 1999 and was closed for security reasons and because of an insufficient number of children. Today, it can be visited after the show apartment, but part of its premises is used as an annex to the University of Saint-Etiennefor the teaching of the Erasmus Mundus MaCLands Master program (Heritage and Management of Unesco cultural landscapes). The terrace, for its part, is no longer freely accessible for security reasons. It is occupied by public infrastructures: solariums facing east and west, an open-air theater, benches, playgrounds. It can also be visited by appointment.

A local radio is also located inside the housing unit (Radio Ondaine).

The unit does not include any commercial businesses within the building: a shopping center was originally planned between the three units to be built.

The building was classified as a historical monument in 1993 and 2010.

== Bibliography ==
- Noël Jouenne, La vie collective des habitants du Corbusier, Paris, L'Harmattan, 2005 ISBN 978-2-7475-8522-4
- Noël Jouenne, Dans l'ombre du Corbusier : Ethnologie d'un habitat collectif ordinaire, Paris, L'Harmattan, 2007 ISBN 978-2-2960-3310-8
- Noël Jouenne, L'expérience corbuséenne d'un habitat collectif sous contrôle, Questions contemporaines, Paris : L'Harmattan, 2017 ISBN 978-2-343127798
