= Church of the Light =

Christian church in Japan

Coordinates: 34°49′7″N 135°32′13″E

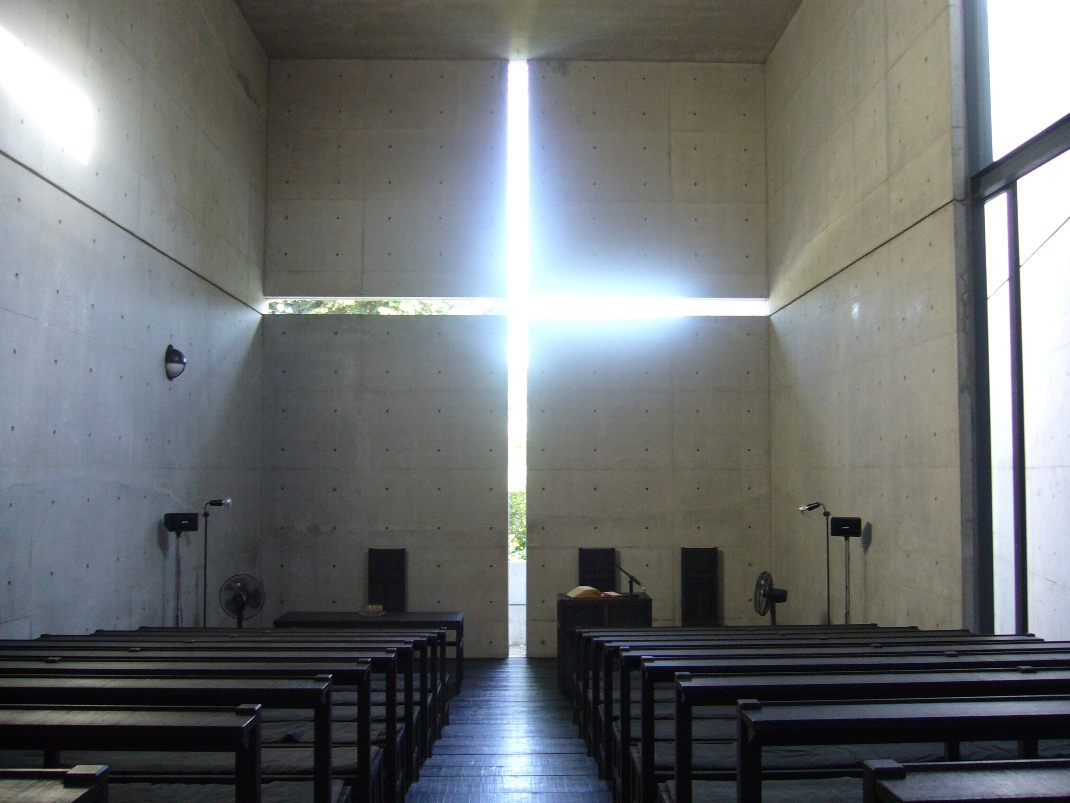
- Interior. Benches are made of planks that were used for scaffolding

General information
- Location: Ibaraki, Osaka, Japan

Technical details
- Structural system: reinforced concrete

Design and construction
- Architect: Tadao Ando

The Church of the Light (sometimes called the "Church with Light") is the main chapel of the Ibaraki Kasugaoka Church, a member church of the United Church of Christ in Japan. It was built in 1989, in the city of Ibaraki, Osaka Prefecture. This building is one of the most famous designs of Japanese architect Tadao Ando.

In 1999, the main building was extended with the addition of a Sunday School.

== Construction and structure ==
The Church of the Light is a small structure on the corner of two streets at Ibaraki, a residential neighborhood. It is located 25 km north-northeast of Osaka in the western foothills of the Yodo valley railway corridor. The church has an area of roughly 113 m^{2} (1216 ft^{2}): about the same size as a small house.

The church was planned as an add-on to the wooden chapel and minister's house that already existed at the site. The Church of the Light consists of three 5.9m concrete cubes (5.9 m wide × 17.7 m long × 5.9 m high) penetrated by a wall angled at 15°, dividing the cube into the chapel and the entrance area. One indirectly enters the church by slipping between the two volumes, one that contains the Sunday school and the other that contains the worship hall. The benches, along with the floor boards, are made of re-purposed scaffolding used in the construction. A cruciform is cut into the concrete behind the altar, and lit during the day.

Work was delayed due to problems in raising the necessary funds. Initially it was feared that it would cost more than the budget and Ando even considered building it without a roof, but the construction firm donated the roof and this became unnecessary.

== Design themes ==
Tadao Ando often uses Zen philosophies when conceptualizing his structures. One theme he expresses in this work is the dual nature of existence. The space of the chapel is defined by light, the strong contrast between light and solid. In the chapel light enters from behind the altar from a cross cut in the concrete wall that extends vertically from floor to ceiling and horizontally from wall to wall, aligning perfectly with the joints in the concrete. At this intersection of light and solid the occupant is meant to become aware of the deep division between the spiritual and the secular within themselves.

One feature of the interior is its profound emptiness. Many who enter the church say they find it disturbing. The distinct void space and absolute quiet amounts to a sense of serenity. For Ando the idea of 'emptiness' means something different. It is meant to transfer someone into the realm of the spiritual. The emptiness is meant to invade the occupant so there is room for the spiritual to fill them.

== Ando and his walls ==
The one element carried through Tadao Ando's structures is his idolization of the reinforced concrete wall. The importance given to walls is a distinct departure from Modernist architecture. They are usually made of 'in-situ' poured in place concrete. Considerable care is taken to see that the walls are as perfect as technique will allow. These walls are thick, solid, massive, and permanent. The main reinforced concrete shell of the Church of the Light is 38 cm (15 in) thick.

Ando has explained his thinking behind the design of the structure in a work co-written with Philip Drew:

"In all my works, light is an important controlling factor. I create enclosed spaces mainly by means of thick concrete walls. The primary reason is to create a place for all the people, a zone for oneself within society. When the external factors of a city's environment require the wall to be without openings, the interior must be especially full and satisfying... At times walls manifest a power that borders on the violent. They have the power to divide space, transfigure place, and create new domains. Walls are the most basic elements of architecture, but they can also be the most enriching."

— Tadao Ando

Drew has expanded on the construction techniques:

"A smooth surface was achieved by adopting a dense engineering quality mix with a slump less than 15cm (6in) and by ensuring thorough vibration with a minimum cover for the reinforcing bars of 5cm (2in) to avoid weathering problems and staining. The density of the concrete results in a glass-like surface that registers the different qualities of light, and tends to dematerialize it. Because Ando's concrete is so precisely wrought and so smooth and reflective, it produces an illusion of a taut, textile surface rather than presenting it as a heavy earthbound mass. Ando has his own teams of expert carpenters to make the formwork who compete against each other; even so, his walls contain imperfections and are uneven."

— Philip Drew

== See also ==
- World Architecture Survey
- Christianity in Japan
