= Planfoy =

- Commune
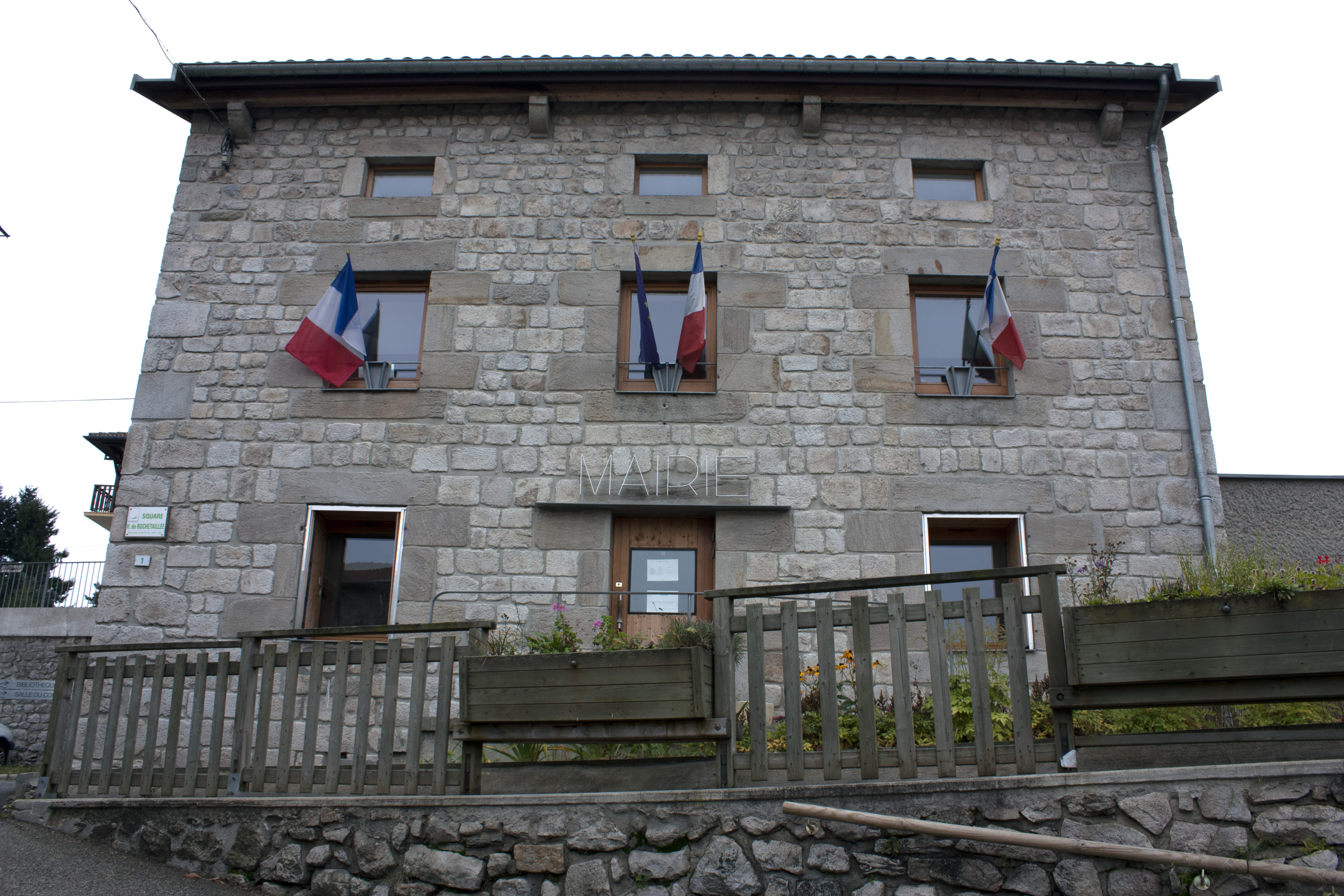
- Town hall
- Location of Planfoy
- Location within France Location within Auvergne-Rhône-Alpes
- Coordinates: 45°23′02″N 4°26′29″E
- Country: France
- Region: Auvergne-Rhône-Alpes
- Department: Loire
- Arrondissement: Saint-Étienne
- Canton: Le Pilat
- Intercommunality: Monts du Pilat

Government
  - Mayor (2020–2026): Cédric Loubet
- Area^{1}: 12.27 km^{2} (4.74 sq mi)
- Elevation: 963 m (3,159 ft)
- Highest elevation: 1,099 m (3,606 ft)
- Lowest elevation: 597 m (1,959 ft)
- Population (2023): 1,075
  - Density: 87.61/km^{2} (226.9/sq mi)
- Time zone: UTC+01:00 (CET)
  - Summer (DST): UTC+02:00 (CEST)
- INSEE/Postal code: 42172 /42660
- ^{1} French Land Register data, which excludes lakes, ponds, glaciers > 1 km^{2} (0.386 sq mi or 247 acres) and river estuaries.

Planfoy (French pronunciation: [plɑ̃fwa]) is a commune in the Loire department in central France.

== Population ==
Historical population
Year	Pop.	±% p.a.
1968	417	—
1975	536	+3.65%
1982	707	+4.03%
1990	778	+1.20%
1999	852	+1.01%
2007	901	+0.70%
2012	969	+1.47%
2017	1,039	+1.40%
2023	1,075	+0.57%
Source: INSEE

== See also ==
- Communes of the Loire department
