= José Oubrerie =

French architect, educator and author (1932–2024)

José R. Oubrerie
- Born: November 9, 1932; France
- Died: March 9, 2024 (aged 91); Lexington, Kentucky, U.S.
- Education: École des Beaux-Arts, Nantes; École Nationale Supérieure des Beaux-Arts, Paris
- Occupations: Architect, educator, author
- Employer(s): Ohio State University; University of Kentucky; University of Illinois at Chicago; Columbia University; Cooper Union; Polytechnic University of Milan
- Known for: Protégé of Le Corbusier; Église Saint-Pierre; Miller House
- Spouse: Michelle Nédélec (married 1955-1988)
- Children: Clément Oubrerie
- Awards: Lumley Research Award (2002)

José R. Oubrerie (9 November 1932 – 9 March 2024) was a French architect, educator, and author. He was a protégé of Le Corbusier.

== Education ==
Oubrerie studied painting at the École des Beaux-Arts (1946–51) in Nantes, and architecture at the École Nationale Supérieure des Beaux-Arts (ENSBA), (1955-58/ 1966–68) in Paris, France. In 1970, Oubrerie was registered in the Ordre des Architectes, Paris, France, and an American Institute of Architects honorary member.

== Projects ==
Oubrerie entered Le Corbusier`s studio at 35 rue de Sèvres in Paris at the age of 25 and worked from 1957 to 1965 on the Maison du Brésil, the Zurichhorn, the Hôpital de Venise and Firminy-Vert.

- Centre Le Corbusier, Zurich, Switzerland; 1963–1967 with Le Corbusier, G. Jullian, et al.
- Église Saint-Pierre with Le Corbusier; 1960–70, 1970–78, 2003–06
- Miller House, Lexington, Kentucky
- French Cultural Center, Damascus, Syria, with Kirkor Kalayciyan and engineer Jean Jacques Couvert, 1988

== Academic career ==
Oubrerie was professor emeritus at Austin E. Knowlton School of Architecture at Ohio State University, having held the position of chair of the architecture department (1991–97) and professor of architecture. Oubrerie is also a visiting professor at the School of Architecture at the University of Illinois at Chicago. From 1987 to 1991, Oubrerie was dean at University of Kentucky College of Design, formerly College of Architecture, in Lexington, Kentucky, where he also taught as a professor of architecture (1980–81, 1983–4). Previously, Oubrerie taught architectural design as assistant professor at New York Institute of Technology (1985–87), Columbia University Graduate School of Architecture, Planning and Preservation (1985–87), and Irwin S. Chanin School of Architecture of Cooper Union (1974) in New York City, as well as Polytechnic University of Milan (1981–83) and Ecole Nationale Superieure des Beaux-Arts (1974–84), Paris.

== Death ==
Oubrerie died in Lexington, Kentucky on 9 March 2024, at the age of 91.

== Awards and honours ==
- 2002 Lumley Research Award, The College of Engineering, Ohio State University

== Exhibitions ==
- 2007/ 2008, L'Eglise Saint-Pierre de Firminy-Vert. John Hartell Gallery, AAP, Cornell University; Wexner Center for the Arts, Ohio State University

== Publications ==
- "L'Oriente di Jeanneret", Parametro, 1986,143, G. Gresleri, L. Benevolo, G. Trebbi, P. L. Cervellati, L. M. Colli, I. Zannier, C. de Seta, J. Oubrerie, E. Masi, K. Frampton, pp. 1–1, 6–64
- Oubrerie, José et al, 2013, Architecture With And Without Le Corbusier : José Oubrerie Architect, Oscar Riera Ojeda Publishers, Hong Kong. ISBN 978-988-15125-7-4
