= Fraisses =

- Commune
- Coat of arms
- Location of Fraisses
- Location within France Location within Auvergne-Rhône-Alpes
- Coordinates: 45°23′19″N 4°16′01″E
- Country: France
- Region: Auvergne-Rhône-Alpes
- Department: Loire
- Arrondissement: Saint-Étienne
- Canton: Firminy
- Intercommunality: Saint-Étienne Métropole

Government
  - Mayor (2020–2026): Christiane Barailler
- Area^{1}: 4.63 km^{2} (1.79 sq mi)
- Elevation: 465 m (1,526 ft)
- Highest elevation: 746 m (2,448 ft)
- Lowest elevation: 437 m (1,434 ft)
- Population (2023): 3,872
  - Density: 836/km^{2} (2,170/sq mi)
- Time zone: UTC+01:00 (CET)
  - Summer (DST): UTC+02:00 (CEST)
- INSEE/Postal code: 42099 /42490
- ^{1} French Land Register data, which excludes lakes, ponds, glaciers > 1 km^{2} (0.386 sq mi or 247 acres) and river estuaries.

Fraisses (French pronunciation: [fʁɛs]) is a commune in the Loire department in central France.

== Population ==
Historical population

Year	Pop.	±% p.a.
1793	464	—
1821	590	+0.86%
1846	680	+0.57%
1872	908	+1.12%
1901	1,999	+2.76%
1926	3,451	+2.21%
1946	3,688	+0.33%
1962	3,623	−0.11%
1968	4,204	+2.51%

Year	Pop.	±% p.a.
1975	4,290	+0.29%
1982	3,854	−1.52%
1990	3,897	+0.14%
1999	3,939	+0.12%
2007	4,074	+0.42%
2012	3,765	−1.57%
2017	3,723	−0.22%
2023	3,872	+0.66%

Source: EHESS and INSEE (1968-2023)

== See also ==
- Communes of the Loire department
