= La Ricamarie =

- Commune
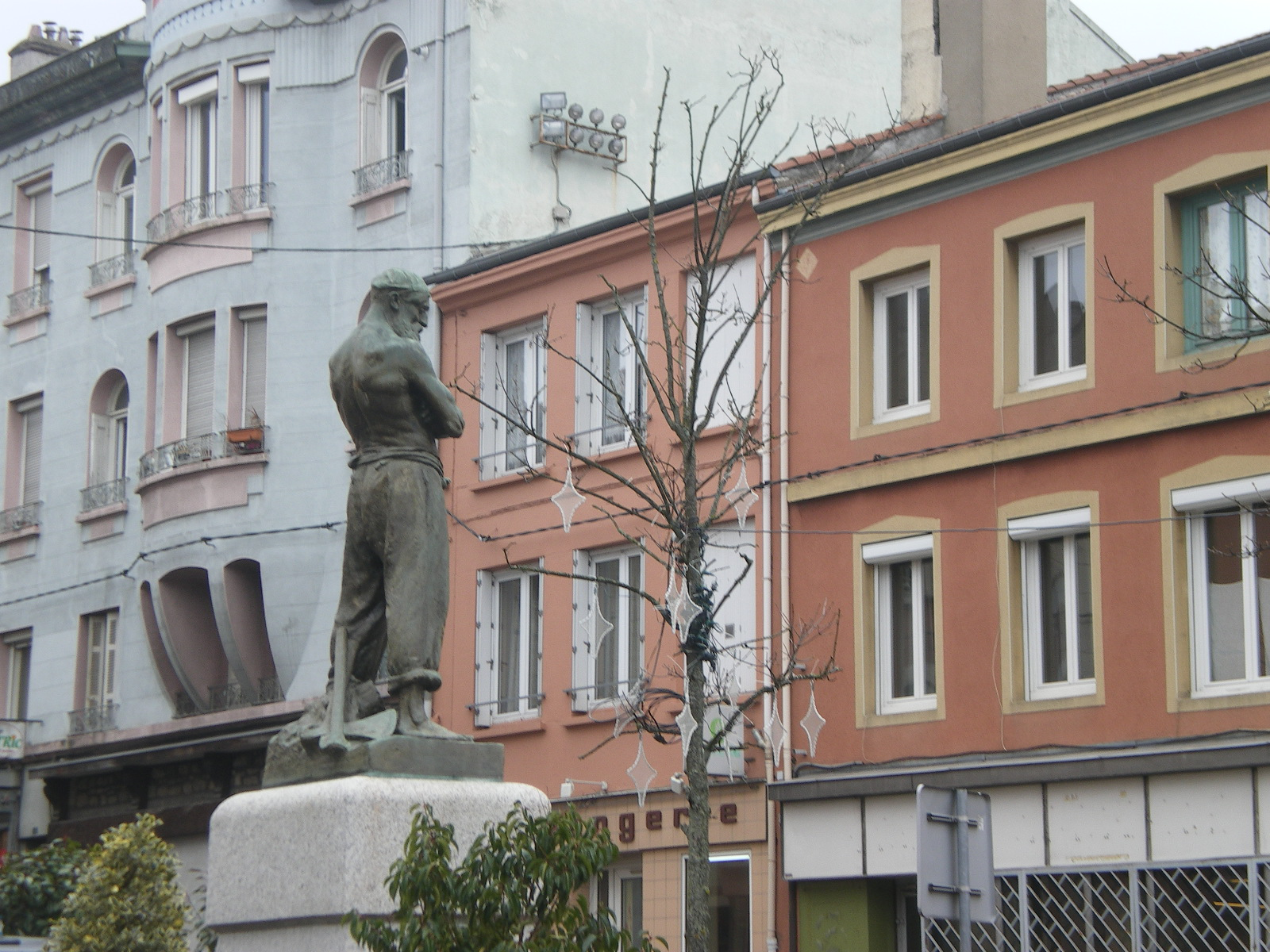
- Statue of Michel Rondet

- Coat of arms
- Location of La Ricamarie
- Location within France Location within Auvergne-Rhône-Alpes
- Coordinates: 45°24′14″N 4°21′54″E
- Country: France
- Region: Auvergne-Rhône-Alpes
- Department: Loire
- Arrondissement: Saint-Étienne
- Canton: Saint-Étienne-2
- Intercommunality: Saint-Étienne Métropole

Government
  - Mayor (2020–2026): Cyrille Bonnefoy
- Area^{1}: 6.95 km^{2} (2.68 sq mi)
- Highest elevation: 841 m (2,759 ft)
- Lowest elevation: 528 m (1,732 ft)
- Population (2023): 8,039
  - Density: 1,160/km^{2} (3,000/sq mi)
- Time zone: UTC+01:00 (CET)
  - Summer (DST): UTC+02:00 (CEST)
- INSEE/Postal code: 42183 /42150
- ^{1} French Land Register data, which excludes lakes, ponds, glaciers > 1 km^{2} (0.386 sq mi or 247 acres) and river estuaries.

La Ricamarie (French pronunciation: [la ʁikamaʁi]) is a commune in the Loire department in central France. It is situated between the city of Saint-Etienne and the town of Firminy.

== Population ==
Historical population

Year	Pop.	±% p.a.
1846	3,921	—
1851	2,739	−6.92%
1856	3,338	+4.03%
1861	3,273	−0.39%
1866	4,131	+4.77%
1872	5,264	+4.12%
1876	6,700	+6.22%
1881	6,773	+0.22%
1886	6,330	−1.34%
1891	7,044	+2.16%
1896	7,310	+0.74%
1901	8,873	+3.95%
1906	9,078	+0.46%
1911	9,927	+1.80%
1921	9,873	−0.05%

Year	Pop.	±% p.a.
1926	10,522	+1.28%
1931	10,246	−0.53%
1936	10,162	−0.16%
1946	9,683	−0.48%
1954	10,915	+1.51%
1962	11,902	+1.09%
1968	11,539	−0.51%
1975	10,426	−1.44%
1982	9,644	−1.11%
1990	10,246	+0.76%
1999	8,438	−2.13%
2007	7,933	−0.77%
2012	7,931	−0.01%
2017	7,906	−0.06%
2023	8,039	+0.28%

Source: EHESS and INSEE (1968-2023)

== Twin towns ==
La Ricamarie is twinned with:

- Pyskowice, Poland, since 1998

== See also ==
- Communes of the Loire department
