= Saint-Pierre, Firminy =

Building by Le Corbusier in France

Coordinates: 45.38356°N 4.28634°E

Saint-Pierre

Religion
- Affiliation: Currently none, designed as Roman Catholic church

Location
- Location: Firminy, Loire, France
- Interactive map of Saint-Pierre

Architecture
- Architects: Le Corbusier and José Oubrerie
- Type: Church
- Groundbreaking: 1973
- Completed: 2006
- Materials: Concrete

Saint-Pierre (English: Saint Peter) is a concrete building in the commune of Firminy, France. The last major work of Le Corbusier, it was started in 1973 and completed in 2006, forty-one years after his death.

== History ==
Designed to be a church in the model city of Firminy Vert, the construction of Saint-Pierre was begun in 1971, six years after Le Corbusier's death in 1965.

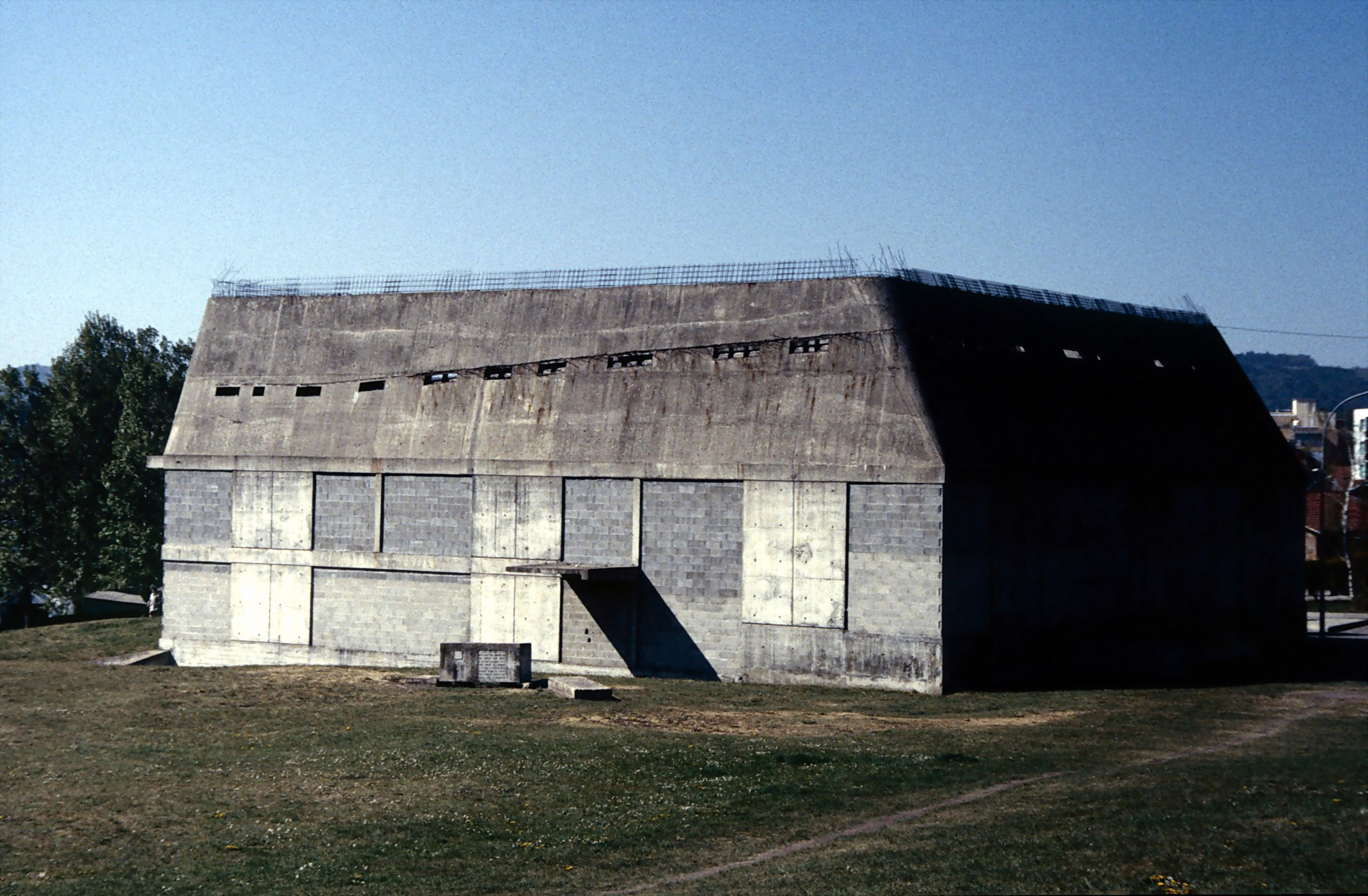
The unfinished stub in 1997

Due to local political conflicts it remained stalled from 1975 to 2003, when the local government declared the mouldering concrete ruin an "architectural heritage" and financed its completion. The building was completed by the French architect José Oubrerie, Le Corbusier's student for many years.

It has been used for many different purposes, as a secondary school and as a shelter. As the secularist French state may not use public funds for religious buildings, Saint-Pierre is now used as a cultural venue.

== Impact on architecture ==
In the World Architecture Survey of 2010, by Vanity Fair magazine, the building was ranked as second in the rankings of the top structures built in the twenty-first century, receiving four votes. American deconstructionist architect Peter Eisenman asserted in his response that this building is the most important structure built since 1980.

== See also ==
- World Architecture Survey
