= Louis de Gallois =

French engineer

Louis de Gallois (12 July 1775 – 25 August 1825) was a French engineer.
