= Le Chambon-Feugerolles =

- Commune
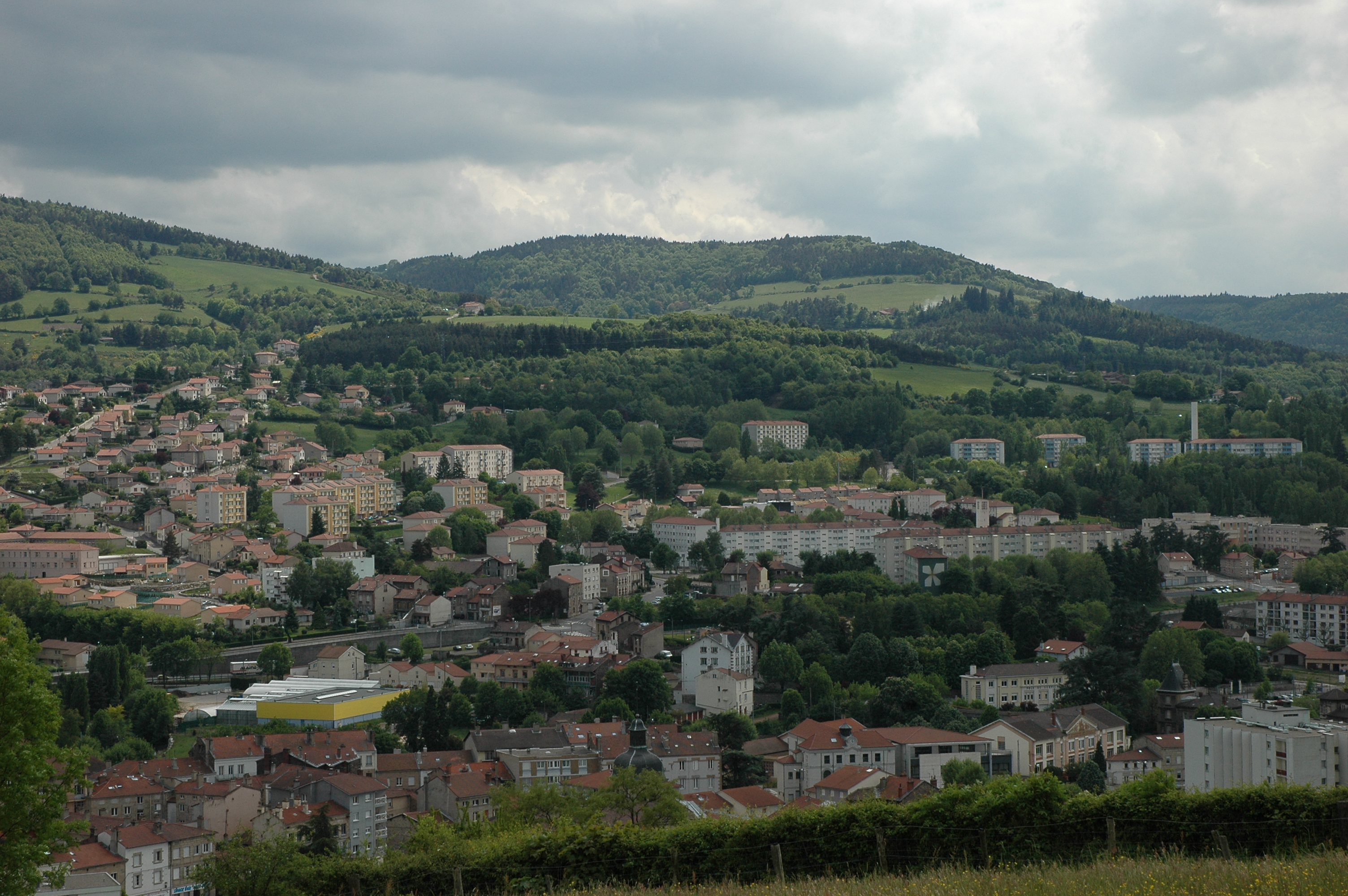

- Coat of arms
- Location of Le Chambon-Feugerolles
- Location within France Location within Auvergne-Rhône-Alpes
- Coordinates: 45°23′49″N 4°19′33″E
- Country: France
- Region: Auvergne-Rhône-Alpes
- Department: Loire
- Arrondissement: Saint-Étienne
- Canton: Saint-Étienne-2
- Intercommunality: Saint-Étienne Métropole

Government
  - Mayor (2020–2026): David Fara
- Area^{1}: 17.51 km^{2} (6.76 sq mi)
- Elevation: 496 m (1,627 ft)
- Highest elevation: 849 m (2,785 ft)
- Lowest elevation: 464 m (1,522 ft)
- Population (2023): 12,314
  - Density: 703.3/km^{2} (1,821/sq mi)
- Time zone: UTC+01:00 (CET)
  - Summer (DST): UTC+02:00 (CEST)
- INSEE/Postal code: 42044 /42500
- ^{1} French Land Register data, which excludes lakes, ponds, glaciers > 1 km^{2} (0.386 sq mi or 247 acres) and river estuaries.

Le Chambon-Feugerolles (pronounced [lə ʃɑ̃bɔ̃ fœʒʁɔl]) is a commune in the French department of Loire, Auvergne-Rhône-Alpes, central France.

== Population ==
Historical population

Year	Pop.	±% p.a.
1793	1,180	—
1806	1,234	+0.34%
1821	1,426	+0.97%
1831	1,600	+1.16%
1841	4,028	+9.67%
1851	3,868	−0.40%
1861	5,514	+3.61%
1872	6,772	+1.89%
1881	8,160	+2.09%
1891	9,016	+1.00%
1901	11,528	+2.49%
1911	12,714	+0.98%
1921	13,516	+0.61%

Year	Pop.	±% p.a.
1931	15,106	+1.12%
1946	15,653	+0.24%
1954	17,695	+1.54%
1962	20,320	+1.74%
1968	21,987	+1.32%
1975	20,091	−1.28%
1982	18,149	−1.44%
1990	16,070	−1.51%
1999	14,090	−1.45%
2007	12,922	−1.08%
2012	12,347	−0.91%
2017	12,317	−0.05%
2023	12,314	−0.00%

Source: EHESS and INSEE

== Twin towns ==
Le Chambon-Feugerolles is twinned with Herzebrock-Clarholz, Germany, since 1973.

== See also ==
- Communes of the Loire department
