= Saint-Paul-en-Cornillon =

- Commune
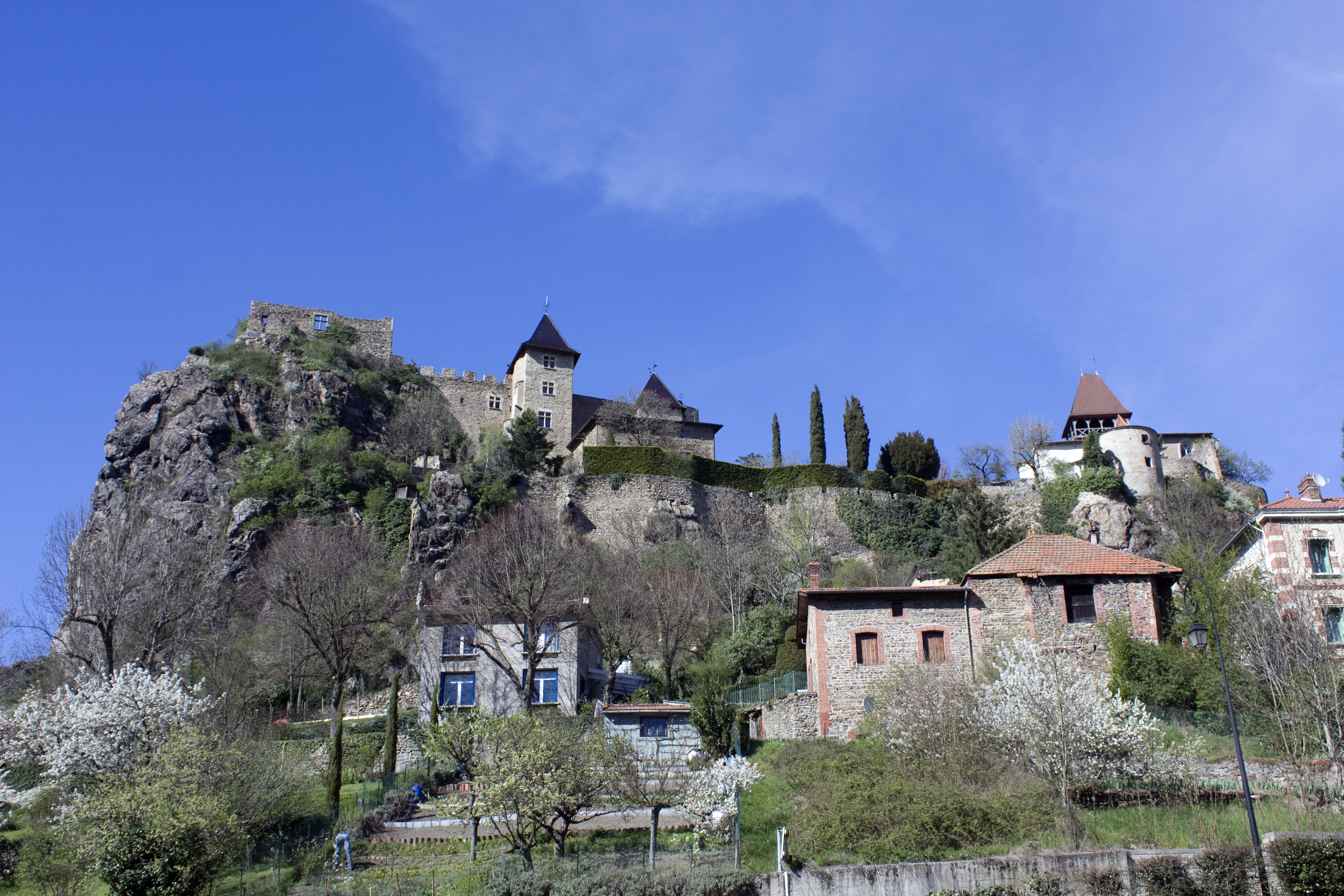
- The upper village

- Coat of arms
- Location of Saint-Paul-en-Cornillon
- Location within France Location within Auvergne-Rhône-Alpes
- Coordinates: 45°23′53″N 4°14′29″E
- Country: France
- Region: Auvergne-Rhône-Alpes
- Department: Loire
- Arrondissement: Saint-Étienne
- Canton: Firminy
- Intercommunality: Saint-Étienne Métropole

Government
  - Mayor (2020–2026): Sylvie Fayolle
- Area^{1}: 3.72 km^{2} (1.44 sq mi)
- Elevation: 430 m (1,410 ft)
- Highest elevation: 713 m (2,339 ft)
- Lowest elevation: 422 m (1,385 ft)
- Population (2023): 1,352
  - Density: 363/km^{2} (941/sq mi)
- Time zone: UTC+01:00 (CET)
  - Summer (DST): UTC+02:00 (CEST)
- INSEE/Postal code: 42270 /42240
- ^{1} French Land Register data, which excludes lakes, ponds, glaciers > 1 km^{2} (0.386 sq mi or 247 acres) and river estuaries.

Saint-Paul-en-Cornillon (French pronunciation: [sɛ̃ pɔl ɑ̃ kɔʁnijɔ̃]; Occitan: Sant Paul jos Cornilhon) is a commune in the Loire department in central France.

== Population ==
Historical population
Year	Pop.	±% p.a.
1968	598	—
1975	672	+1.68%
1982	1,045	+6.51%
1990	1,122	+0.89%
1999	1,304	+1.68%
2007	1,288	−0.15%
2012	1,339	+0.78%
2017	1,364	+0.37%
2023	1,352	−0.15%
Source: INSEE

== Gallery ==
Castle of Saint Paul en Cornillon (11th Century)

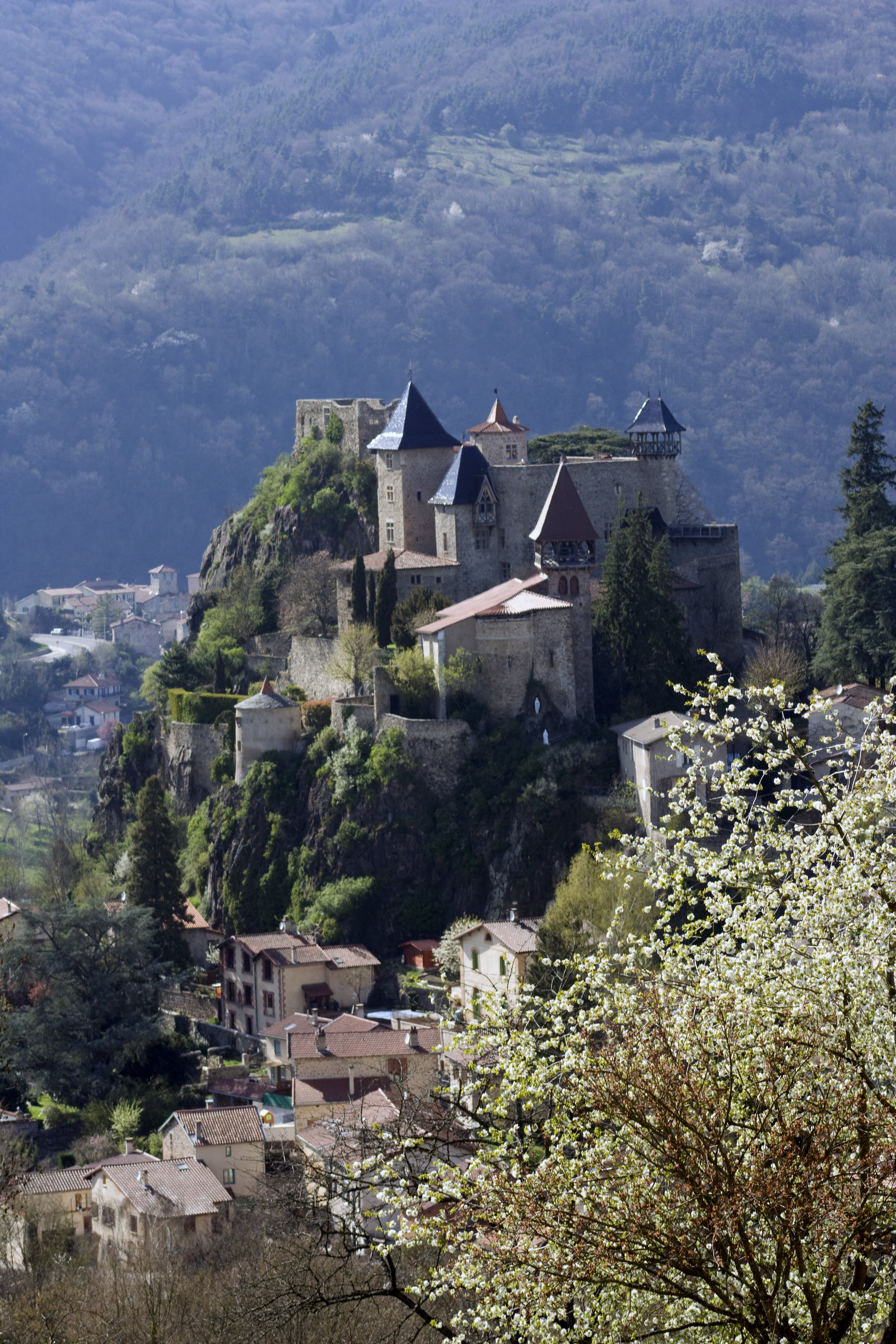
The château

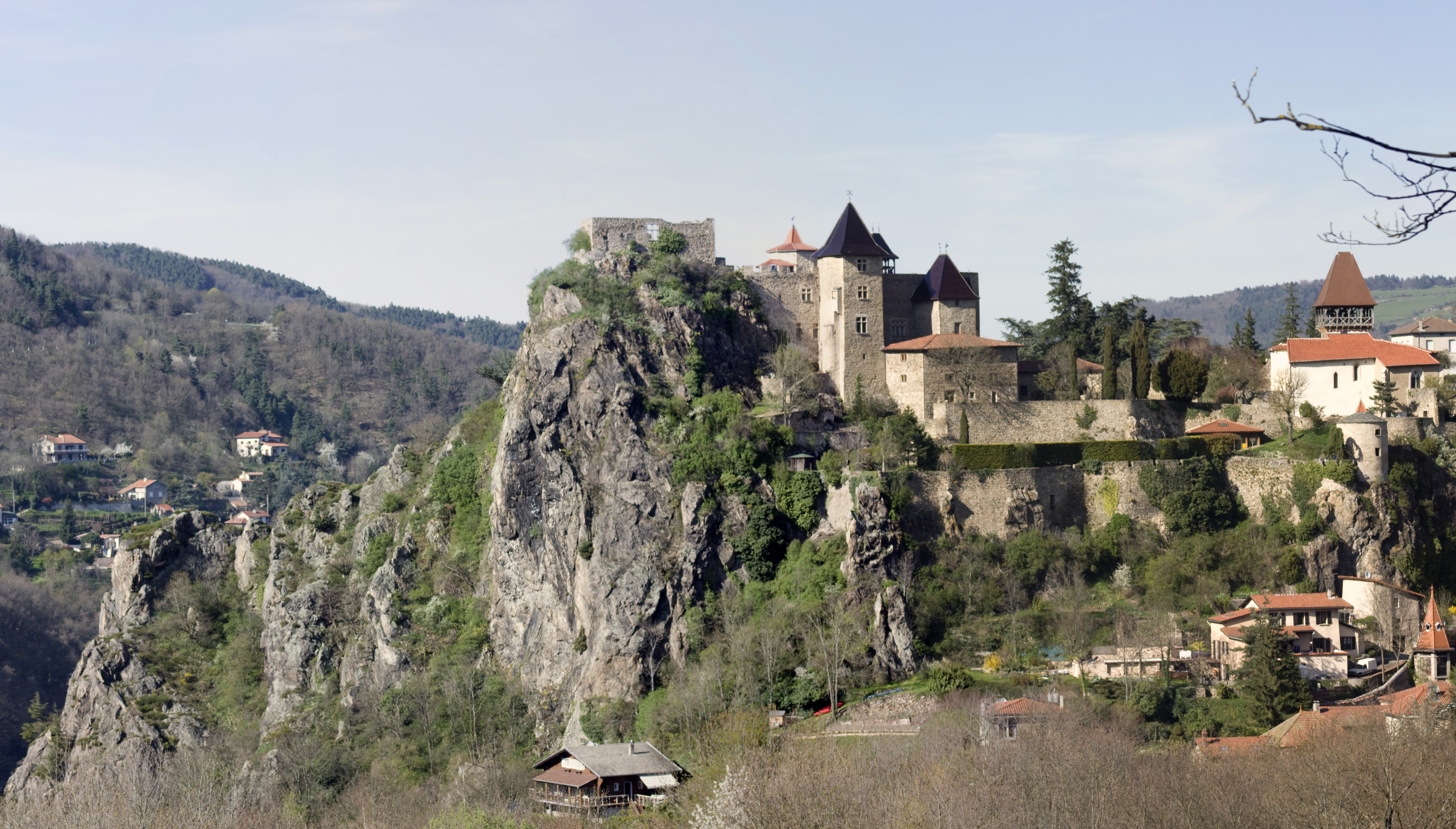
A view from the south

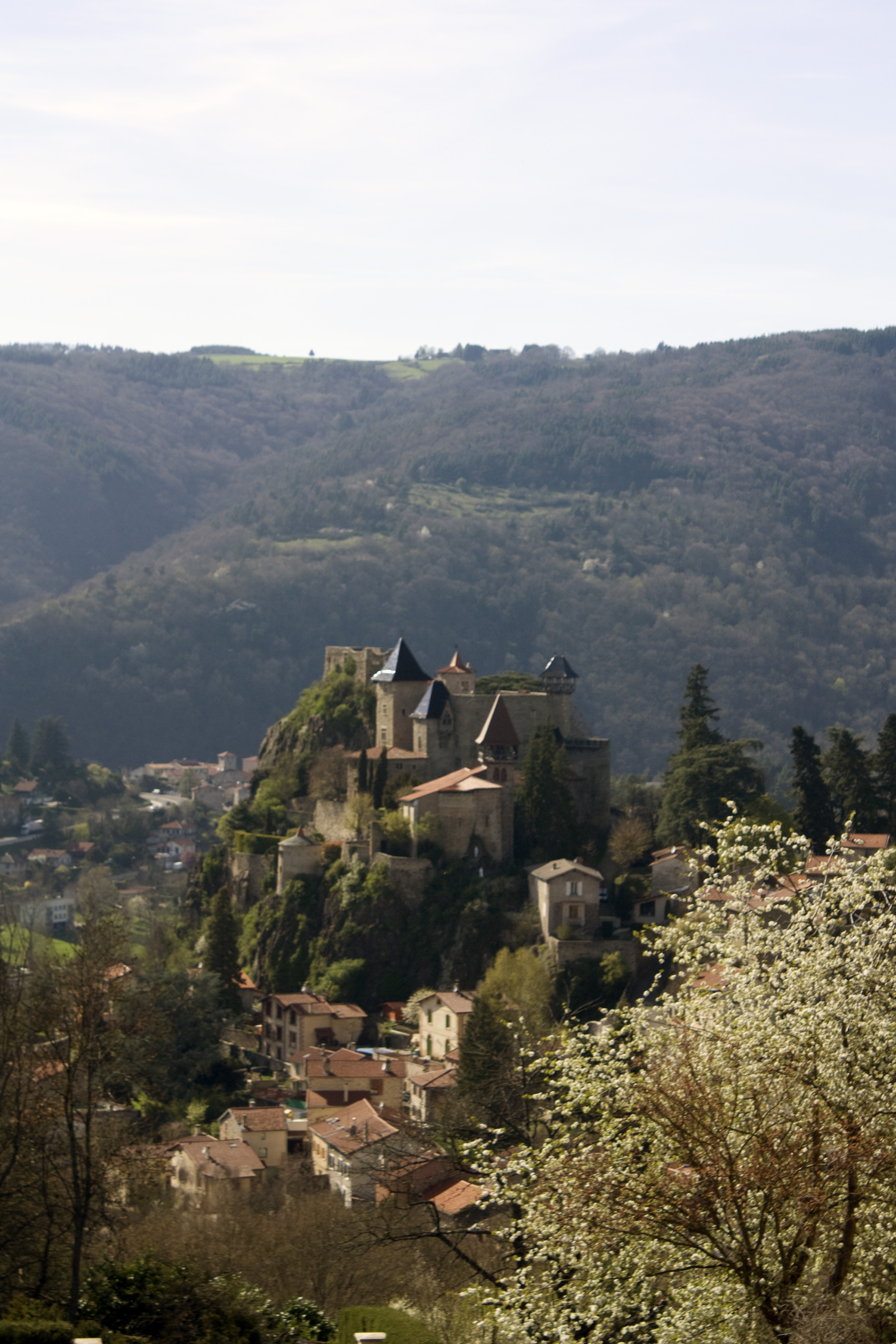
A view from the east

== See also ==
- Communes of the Loire department
