= Unieux =

- Commune
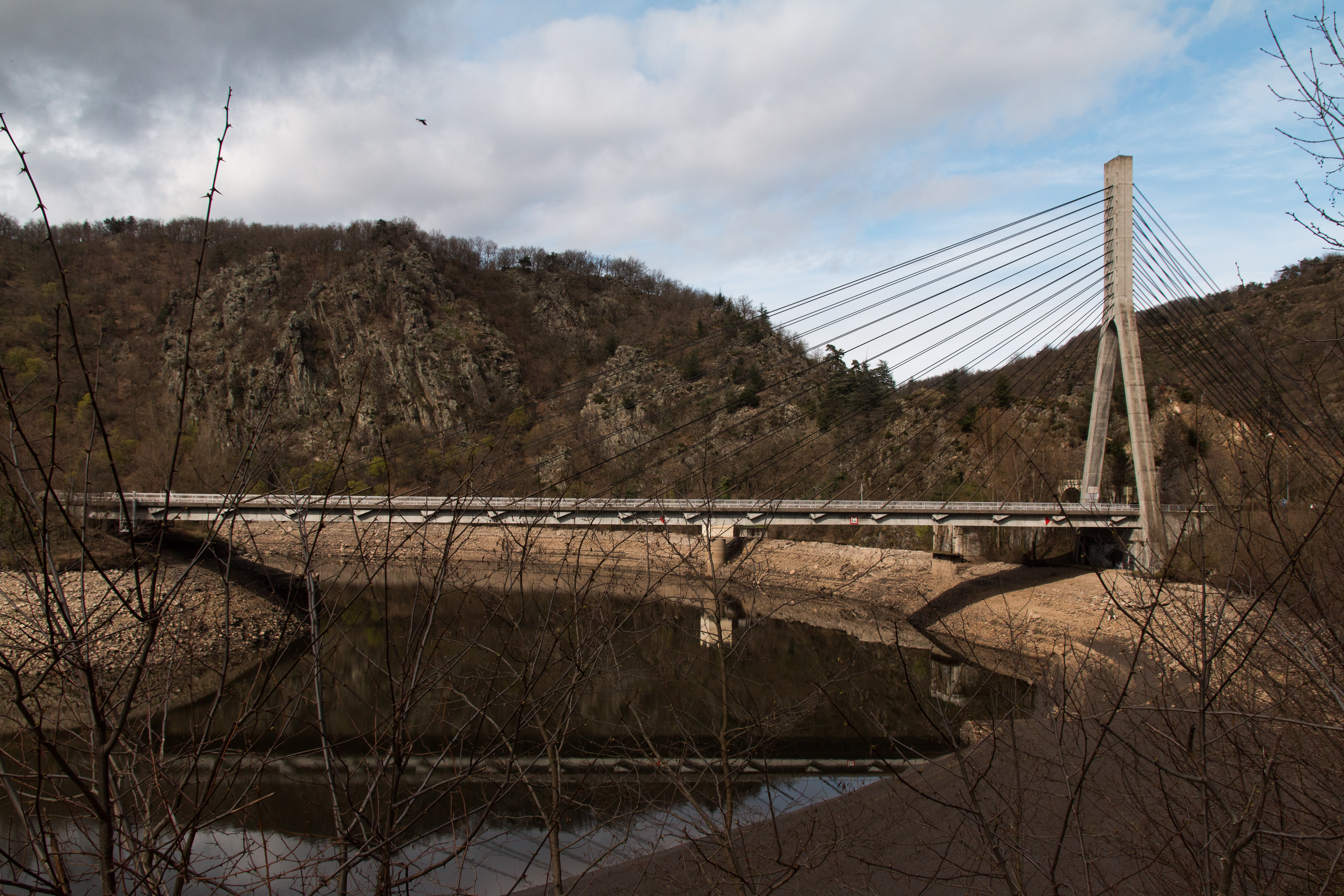
- Le Pertuiset bridge

- Coat of arms
- Location of Unieux
- Location within France Location within Auvergne-Rhône-Alpes
- Coordinates: 45°24′09″N 4°15′44″E
- Country: France
- Region: Auvergne-Rhône-Alpes
- Department: Loire
- Arrondissement: Saint-Étienne
- Canton: Firminy
- Intercommunality: Saint-Étienne Métropole

Government
  - Mayor (2020–2026): Christophe Faverjon
- Area^{1}: 8.58 km^{2} (3.31 sq mi)
- Elevation: 460 m (1,510 ft)
- Highest elevation: 660 m (2,170 ft)
- Lowest elevation: 421 m (1,381 ft)
- Population (2023): 8,514
  - Density: 992/km^{2} (2,570/sq mi)
- Time zone: UTC+01:00 (CET)
  - Summer (DST): UTC+02:00 (CEST)
- INSEE/Postal code: 42316 /42240
- ^{1} French Land Register data, which excludes lakes, ponds, glaciers > 1 km^{2} (0.386 sq mi or 247 acres) and river estuaries.

Unieux (French pronunciation: [ynjø]) is a commune in the Loire department in central France.

Unieux is located within a larger metropolitan area surrounded by varied countryside.

In recent years, the council of Unieux has made great efforts to improve and modernize the communications infrastructure. This has included road and transport improvements, and the addition of a sophisticated multimedia library that enables the citizens of Unieux to keep in touch with the world beyond Unieux.

== Population ==
Historical population

Year	Pop.	±% p.a.
1793	923	—
1800	739	−3.13%
1806	883	+3.01%
1821	1,048	+1.15%
1831	1,429	+3.15%
1836	1,490	+0.84%
1841	1,472	−0.24%
1846	1,607	+1.77%
1851	1,682	+0.92%
1856	1,952	+3.02%
1861	2,414	+4.34%
1866	3,235	+6.03%
1872	3,203	−0.17%
1876	3,441	+1.81%
1881	3,850	+2.27%
1886	4,005	+0.79%
1891	4,150	+0.71%
1896	4,377	+1.07%
1901	4,809	+1.90%

Year	Pop.	±% p.a.
1906	5,096	+1.17%
1911	5,187	+0.35%
1921	5,617	+0.80%
1926	5,881	+0.92%
1931	5,914	+0.11%
1936	5,650	−0.91%
1946	5,847	+0.34%
1954	6,894	+2.08%
1962	7,718	+1.42%
1968	8,428	+1.48%
1975	9,092	+1.09%
1982	8,265	−1.35%
1990	8,064	−0.31%
1999	8,339	+0.37%
2007	8,485	+0.22%
2012	8,761	+0.64%
2017	8,597	−0.38%
2023	8,514	−0.16%

Source: EHESS and INSEE (1968-2023)

== Born in Unieux ==
- Marcel Thibaud (1896-1985), politician

== Transportation ==
Transport is primarily by road. But one can take the train from Gare de Saint-Étienne-Châteaucreux, so long as one is prepared to travel the 12 km between Unieux and Saint-Étienne.

== See also ==
- Communes of the Loire department
