= Firminy =

- Commune
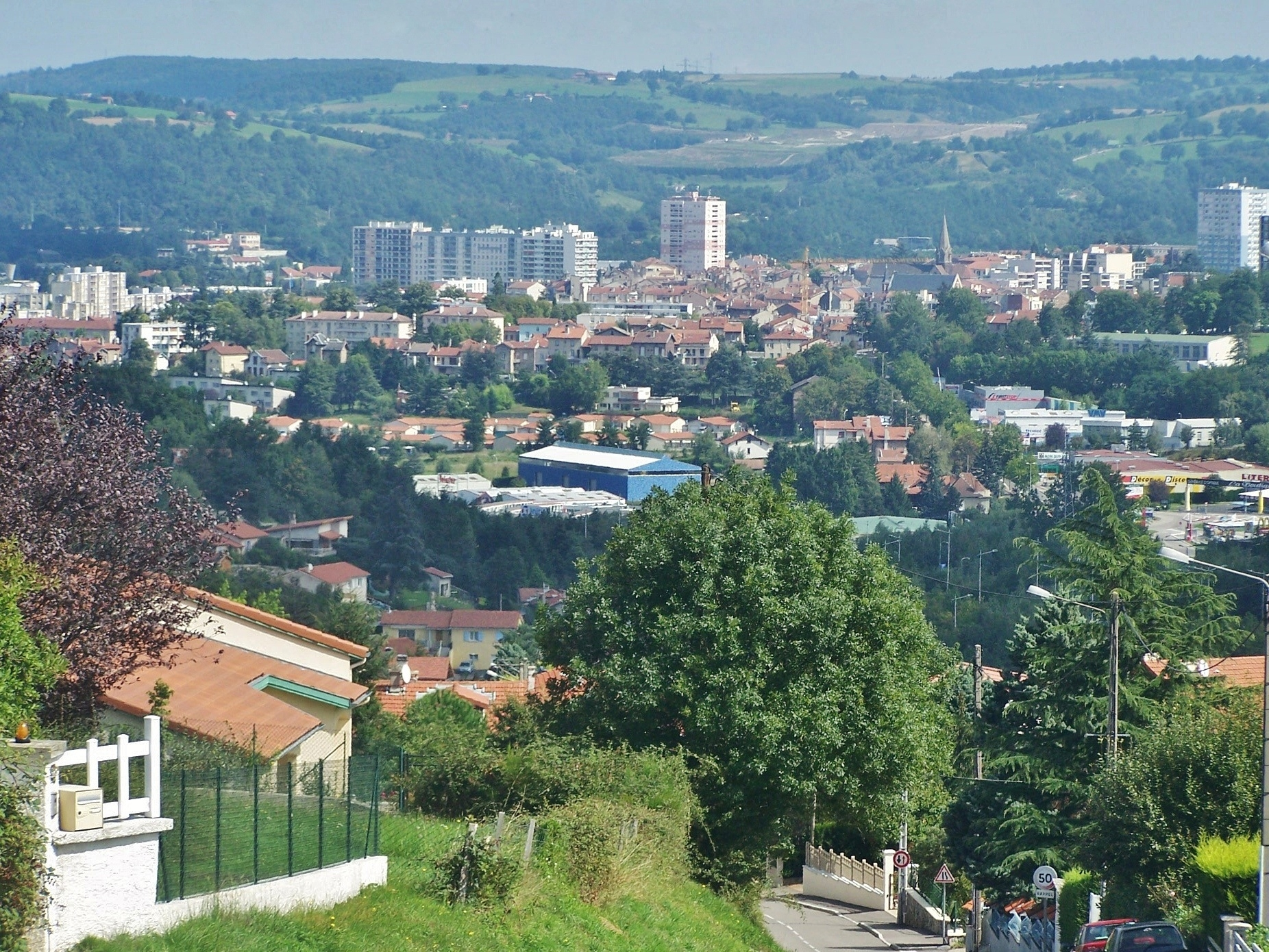

- Coat of arms
- Location of Firminy
- Location within France Location within Auvergne-Rhône-Alpes
- Coordinates: 45°23′20″N 4°17′16″E
- Country: France
- Region: Auvergne-Rhône-Alpes
- Department: Loire
- Arrondissement: Saint-Étienne
- Canton: Firminy
- Intercommunality: Saint-Étienne Métropole

Government
  - Mayor (2020–2026): Julien Luya
- Area^{1}: 10.45 km^{2} (4.03 sq mi)
- Elevation: 468 m (1,535 ft)
- Highest elevation: 800 m (2,600 ft)
- Lowest elevation: 446 m (1,463 ft)
- Population (2023): 17,060
  - Density: 1,633/km^{2} (4,228/sq mi)
- Time zone: UTC+01:00 (CET)
  - Summer (DST): UTC+02:00 (CEST)
- INSEE/Postal code: 42095 /42700
- ^{1} French Land Register data, which excludes lakes, ponds, glaciers > 1 km^{2} (0.386 sq mi or 247 acres) and river estuaries.

Firminy (French pronunciation: [fiʁmini]; Occitan: Frominiu) is a commune in the Loire department in central France.

It lies on the river Ondaine, 13 km southwest of Saint-Étienne by rail.

== History ==
The ancient name of the town was Firminiaco or Firminiacus (lit. "place of Firmin"). The name was first recorded in a 971 charter by the King of Burgundy.

Firminy had historically important coalmines known since the 14th century and extensive manufactures of iron, steel, and aluminum goods, including railway material, machinery and cannon. Fancy woolen hosiery was also manufactured. In 1959, Firminy absorbed the former commune Chazeau.

== Population ==
Historical population

Year	Pop.	±% p.a.
1793	1,486	—
1800	1,713	+2.05%
1806	1,821	+1.02%
1821	2,627	+2.47%
1831	3,779	+3.70%
1836	3,784	+0.03%
1841	4,306	+2.62%
1846	4,774	+2.08%
1851	5,374	+2.40%
1856	6,420	+3.62%
1861	7,672	+3.63%
1866	9,217	+3.74%
1872	10,422	+2.07%
1876	11,972	+3.53%
1881	13,707	+2.74%
1886	13,992	+0.41%
1891	14,511	+0.73%
1896	15,771	+1.68%
1901	16,903	+1.40%

Year	Pop.	±% p.a.
1906	17,944	+1.20%
1911	19,580	+1.76%
1921	20,194	+0.31%
1926	21,303	+1.07%
1931	21,365	+0.06%
1936	20,257	−1.06%
1946	20,362	+0.05%
1954	21,161	+0.48%
1962	26,065	+2.64%
1968	24,924	−0.74%
1975	25,060	+0.08%
1982	24,113	−0.55%
1990	23,123	−0.52%
1999	19,297	−1.99%
2007	17,569	−1.17%
2012	17,123	−0.51%
2017	17,135	+0.01%
2023	17,060	−0.07%

Source: EHESS and INSEE (1968-2023)

== Sights ==
Le Corbusier's Saint-Pierre Church

Two historic churches from the 12th and 16th centuries are located here. The architect Le Corbusier designed a group of modern buildings, called "Firminy Vert", which includes the Saint-Pierre Church, a stadium, a cultural center, and an Unité d'Habitation.

== See also ==
- Communes of the Loire department
- Maurice Debesse
