= Southport Derby Road MPD =

Rail depot in Birkenhead, England

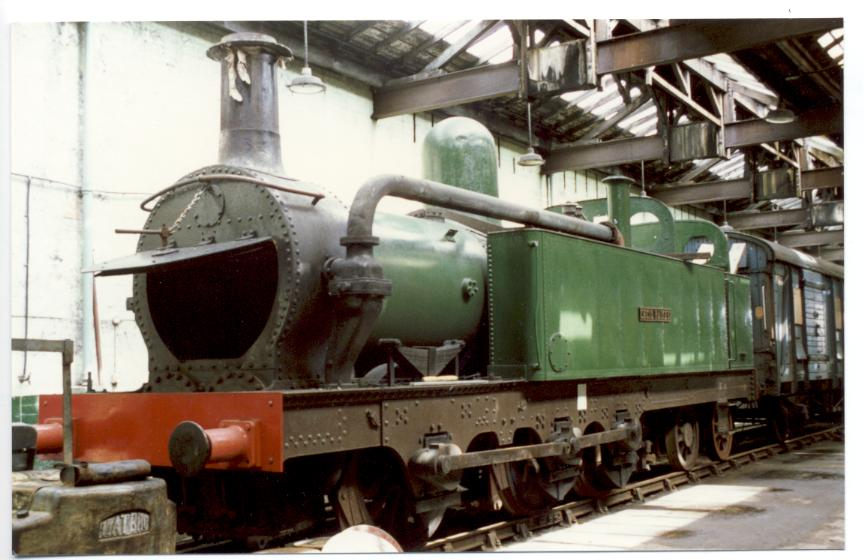
- A Mersey Railway 0-6-4T No.5 "Cecil Raikes" inside the depot, 1988.
- Interactive map of Southport Derby Road MPD

Location
- Location: Southport, then Lancashire (Now Sefton)
- Coordinates: 53.645424°N 2.996631°W
- OS grid: SD3423917028

Characteristics
- Owner: British Rail
- Operator: British Rail (1948-1966)
- Depot code: 8M
- Type: Steam; Diesel

History
- Opened: 1890
- Closed: 6 June 1966
- Original: L&YR
- Pre-grouping: L&YR
- Post-grouping: LMS
- Former depot code: 23C (1935-1950); 27C (1950-1963); 8M (1963-1966)

Southport Derby Road MPD was a Motive power depot located at Derby Road in Southport, England. The depot serviced steam until 1966 when it was closed. The site of the depot is now occupied by a retail unit.

== History ==
Derby Road shed first opened in 1890 under the ownership of the Lancashire and Yorkshire Railway. In January 1935, under the ownership of the London, Midland and Scottish Railway, Derby Road was given the shed-code number 23C, which it was to have for the remainder of its days under the LMS and for the first two years of British Railways ownership. From 1948 Derby Road shed became part of the Liverpool Bank Hall area and, in June 1950, the shedcode was changed from 23C to 27C.

Following the amalgamation of the four pre-grouping companies into BR, Southport shed was given the code 23C, in 1950, and was to be one of the sheds in the Liverpool Bank Hall area. The shedcode 23C, however, would not last for too long, as the Liverpool Bank Hall area number was changed to 27, from June 1950, with the Derby Road shed code being changed to 27C at the same time.

The main locomotive allocations to Derby Road shed over the years were LMS Black 5 4-6-0s, including the two Caprotti valve gear Black 5s Nos. 44686 and 44687. Alongside the two Caprotti-geared Black 5s were two other engines which would later be preserved, 44767 (the unique Stephenson valve gear Black 5) & 45337, which were allocated to Derby Road in 1962 & 1963 respectively. As well as the Black 5s, other class allocations included: BR Standard Class 4 4-6-0s, LMS Compound 4-4-0s, LMS Fairburn 2-6-4Ts, LMS Fowler 2-6-4Ts, LMS Fowler Class 4F 0-6-0s, alongside numerous pre-LMS machines.

== Final years under British Railways ==
In September 1963, Derby Road's shed code was changed from 27C to 8M (and the shed was transferred from the Bank Hall section of Liverpool to Edge Hill), which it was to carry until the shed's final closure in June 1966. During the time when diesels were taking over from steam engines none of the then-modern diesels were allocated to Derby Road's 27C (later 8M) shed. Allocation of steam engines to the shed ceased in November 1965, and by the end of the year just seven engines were allocated to the shed, these being three Black 5's and four Fairburn tanks. The majority were transferred to other depots, with one of the Black 5's (one of the Caprotti geared Black 5's), No. 44687, being withdrawn from service. The depot closed on Monday, 6 June, 1966, with the final engines being removed from the site by the 18 June.

== Steamport, Southport ==
Derby Road shed closed completely in 1966, prior to the withdrawal of steam traction on the British Railways network and, alongside being stripped of recoverable materials, the building was also heavily vandalised over the years. In 1971, a group was established with plans to start up a museum in the former locomotive shed. The building, however, was heavily in need of repairs as there was no track in certain places, the yard was covered in rubble, the shed building had no glass in the roof, the electricity and water supplies had been cut off and BR had severed the rail connection to the shed.

Following negotiations with BR, regarding a lease of the site and buildings, the site was occupied by the group in 1973, allowing the necessary repairs to be undertaken, alongside laying track in the shed, and by August of the same year the first steam engines began to arrive on site. In 1974, an agreement was reached, regarding a connection from BR to the shed, the connection being made through land adjacent to the former goods depot at Kensington Road. By August 1974, the first main line steam locomotives had arrived, which were an LMS Jinty 0-6-0 No. 47298 (which was rescued from Barry Scrapyard) and LMS Black 5 4-6-0 No 44806, which at that point had been named Magpie. Prior to moving to Derby Road shed, 44806 had been based at the Lakeside and Haverthwaite Railway. It was decided to move it to Steamport after a crack in the firebox opened up, which it wasn't possible to repair at Haverthwaite, due to it being beyond their capabilities and facilities.

Other locomotives that would be based at Derby Road, prior to being restored or where restoration was to be undertaken, included BR Standard Class 4 2-6-0 No. 76079 and GWR 5101 Class 2-6-2T No. 5193 (later rebuilt as 9351).

In addition to the steam locomotives that were based at Steamport, the depot was also home to non-steam traction, including Class 24 diesel-electric locomotive No. 24 081, Class 52 "Western" diesel-hydraulic locomotive No. D1048 "Western Lady" and the National Railway Museum's Class 502 Merseyrail electric unit driving cars nos. M28361 (a driving motor) and M29896 (a driving trailer).

In 1978 a 60-foot turntable was purchased from BR and was moved from its then location at York, by rail, to Derby Road. The former L&YR turntable pit had, prior to the lease of the shed to the group, been filled in with rubble, so before the turntable could be installed this rubble needed to be removed. The shed was also (during the 1980s) popular with steam hauled excursion trains, including the regular "Southport Visitor" trains, which would run from Southport to Manchester and back via Wigan, while hauled by a visiting mainline approved steam engines. Visiting engines for these trains included: 4472 Flying Scotsman, 5407, 5593 Kolhapur, 44932 and 45596 Bahamas.

Steamport closed in November 1997 and the rolling stock moved to Preston to form the Ribble Steam Railway. Following the closure of the museum, the shed and additional buildings were demolished to make way for the new Central 12 shopping park, which would be built on top of the former shed. Nothing remains of the shed today, apart from the former gates opposite the Bacon Factory at Windsor Road, which are visible from the footbridge.

== Gallery ==
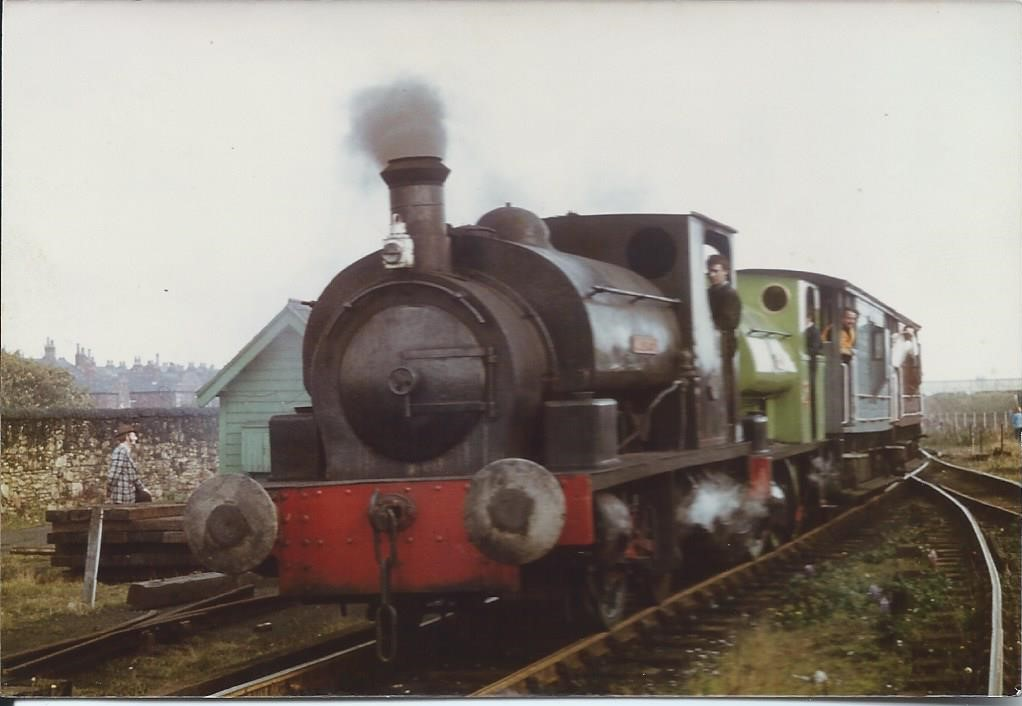
Waleswood at Steamport Southport 1978

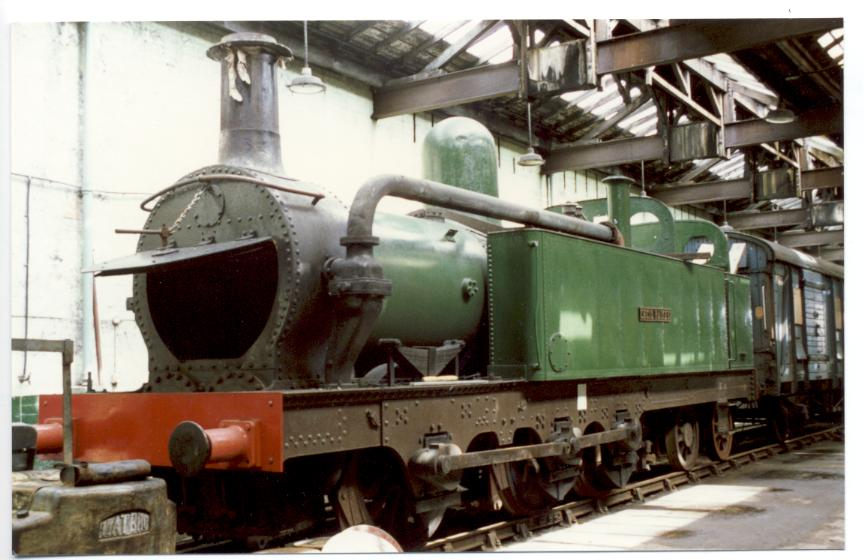
Mersey Railway 0-6-4T No.5 "Cecil Raikes" at Steamport Southport in 1988
