= Double chimney =

Part on steam locomotives

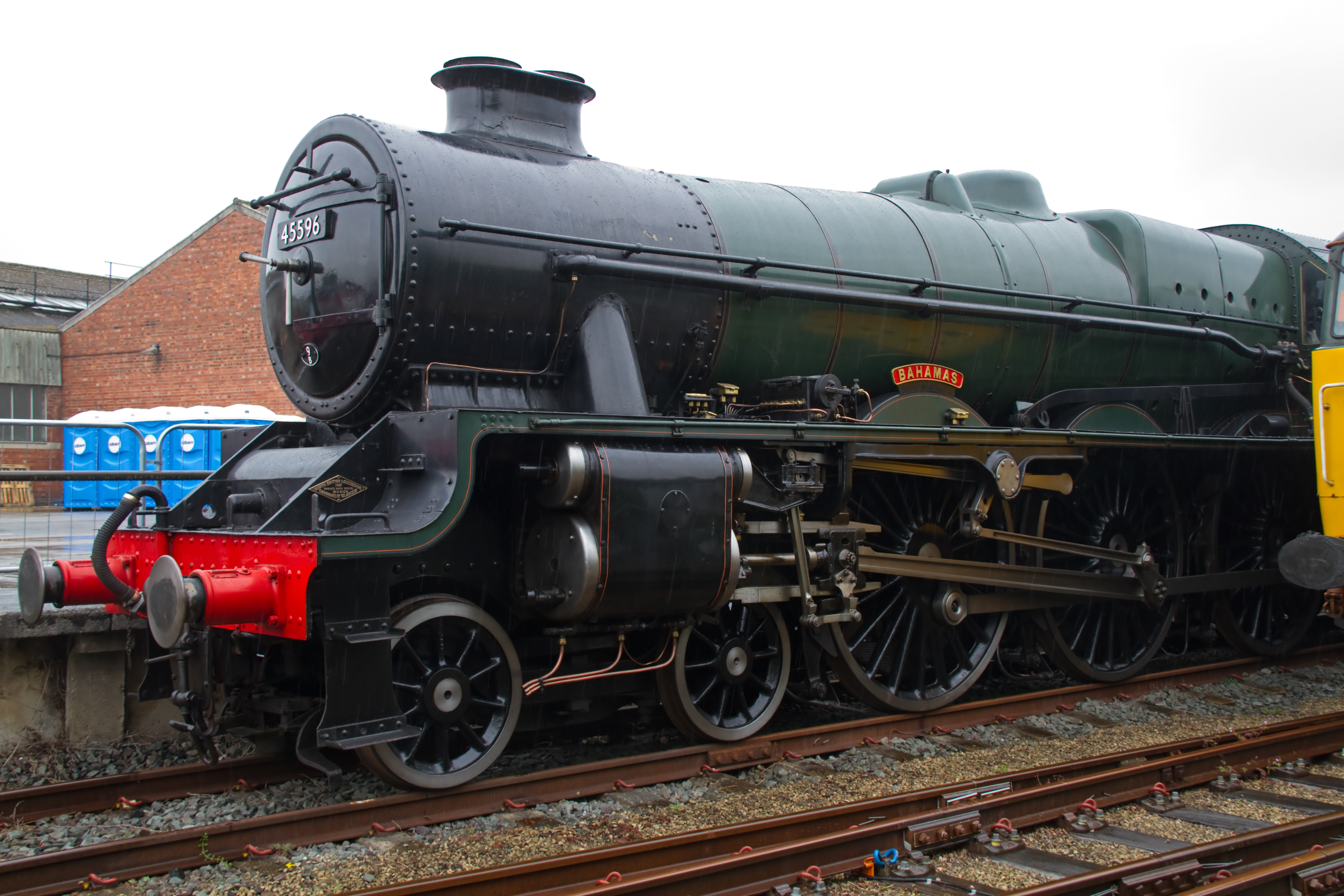
LMS Jubilee 5596 Bahamas

A double chimney (or double stack, double smokestack in American English) is a form of chimney for a steam locomotive, where the conventional single opening is duplicated, together with the blastpipe beneath it. Although the internal openings form two circles, the outside appearance usually forms a single elongated oval.

== Purpose ==
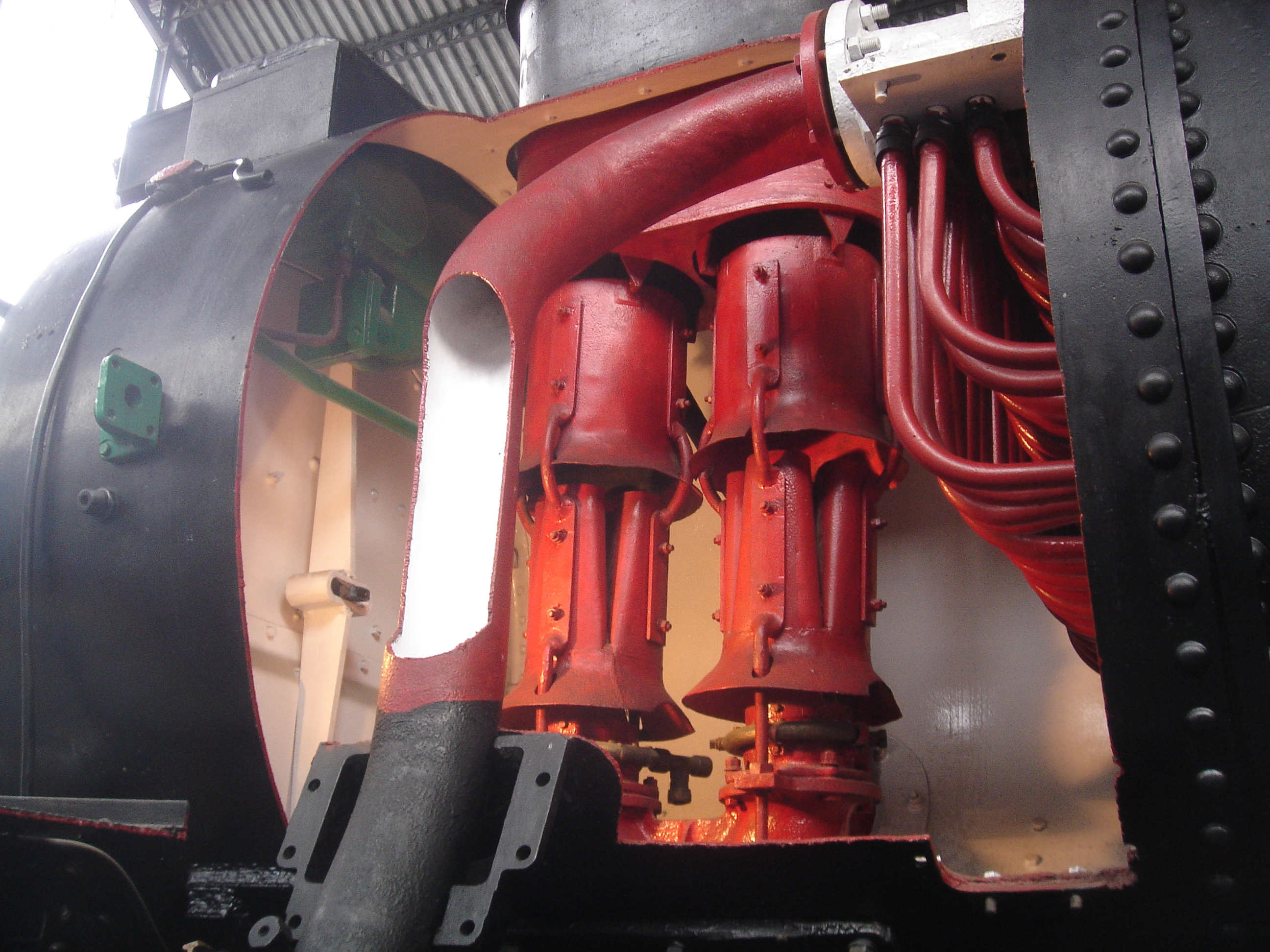
Sectioned smokebox, showing the double chimney and Kylchap blastpipes of a RENFE (Spanish) class 141 F

The classic exhaust design for a steam locomotive began with Hackworth's invention of the blastpipe, placed centrally within a tall chimney. Victorian developments reduced the chimney's height, such that natural draught was no longer significant. The standard design was then a circular drumhead smokebox, with a single blastpipe nozzle leading into a chimney with a flared petticoat pipe beneath it. From the work of theorists such as W.F.M. Goss of Purdue University, and later S.O. Ell of Swindon, guidelines were developed at each locomotive works, describing how these were to be proportioned.

It was recognised both that a particular diameter of chimney and blastpipe would be needed for the steam-raising capacity of each boiler, and also that the conical taper from blastpipe to chimney could not be made too steep. As boilers became more powerful, not only did the chimney diameter need to become greater, but also the minimum height for the chimney was becoming longer – just as the increasing size of boilers restricted the clearance height available within the loading gauge. A chimney height (Note: Note that this is the internal length of the chimney, to the petticoat pipe, not the external height above the boiler.) of at least 24 inches was considered the minimum workable. By the 1930s, it was increasingly difficult to provide such a height and other solutions were sought.

A solution to this limit was to adopt a double chimney. This allowed adequate cross-section area for airflow, whilst reducing the diameter of each and thus the minimum height needed for an acceptably gentle taper. (Note: A similar approach led to the Giesl ejector. This used a large number of separate chimney channels, arranged in a row, allowing each to become a very long, thin taper.)

=== Kylchap blastpipes ===
A simultaneous development was the Kylchap blastpipe, combining the Kylälä spreader by Finnish engineer Kyösti Kylälä, and a further flue choke tube added by the French engineer André Chapelon. This split the blastpipe area into four smaller nozzles, and the vertical draught induction across three stacked venturis. Although the total blastpipe area remained constant, their perimeter, and thus the area for mixing with the exhaust gases, was doubled. The additional petticoats also improved the effectiveness of the blast in inducing a draught.

Although there is no reason why one approach, either the double chimney or the Kylchap blastpipe, depends on the other, interest in both was generally simultaneous and so both were often installed together.

=== Disadvantages ===
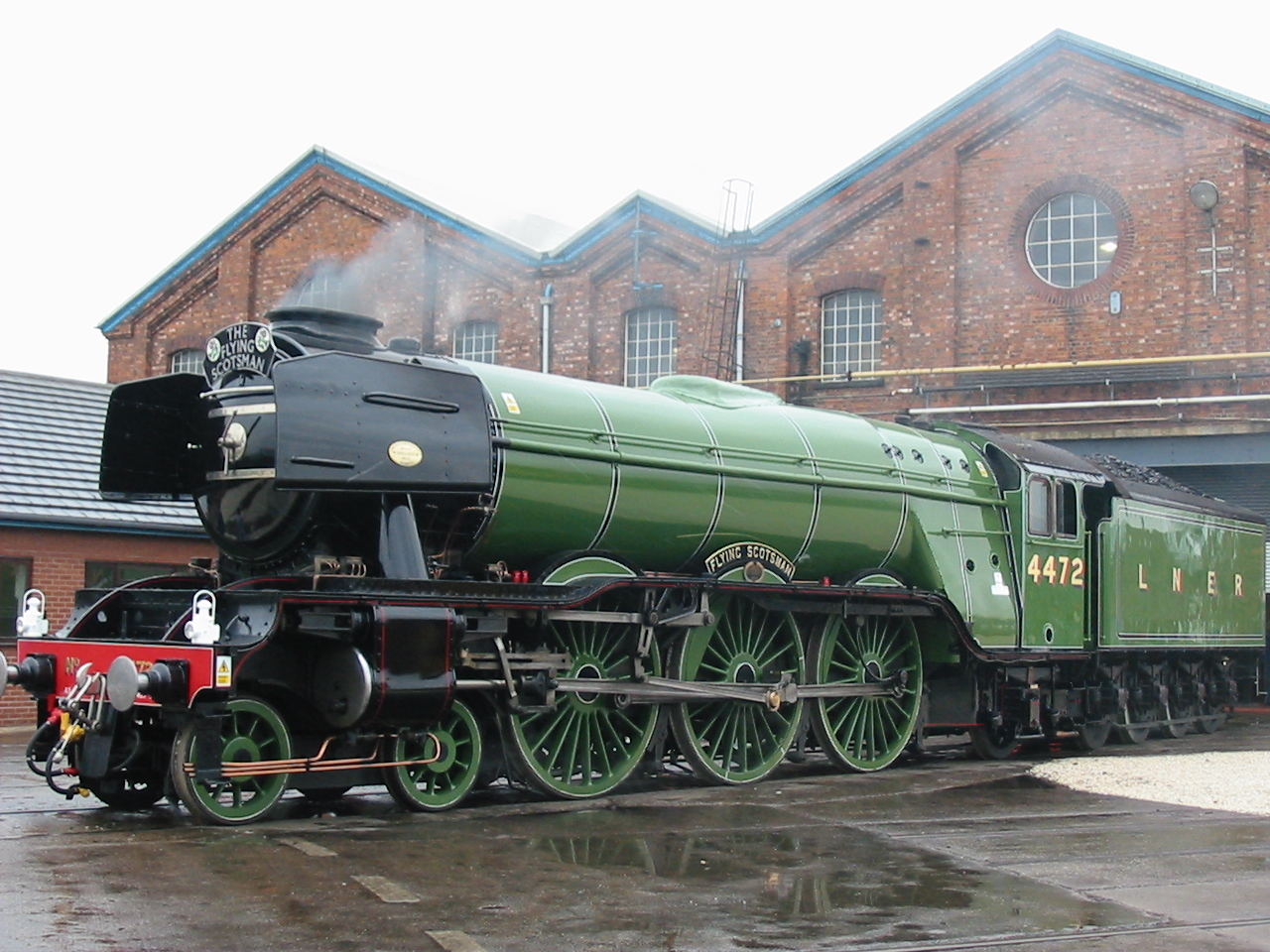
4472 Flying Scotsman in 2003, with Witte-type smoke deflectors refitted

The first 50 of the Ivatt class 4MT 2-6-0 were built with double chimneys. These performed poorly however, and were noted as poor steamers. Work on the static test plant at Rugby discovered that there was both no advantage to the double chimney and also that it had been poorly designed initially. When revised with a single chimney and improved gas flow in the smokebox, their steaming rate was raised from 9,000 lb/hour with a double chimney to 17,000 lb/hour with a single chimney, even though this was still below the theoretical limit, restricted by firegrate size, of 19,000 lb/hour.

A minor disadvantage could be a 'softer' exhaust blast for the purpose of lifting the external smoke clear of the driver's vision. When the LNER A3 class were fitted with double chimneys in the late 1950s, they suffered problems with smoke obscuring the view from the cab. (Note: The A3s did not have the smoke-lifting streamlining of the A4s.) The solution to this was to fit small Witte-type smoke deflectors of the German pattern.

== Notable installations ==
Many double chimney installations, at least in the UK, were performed as experimental conversions in the 1930s, rather than as new builds.

=== LNER A4 ===
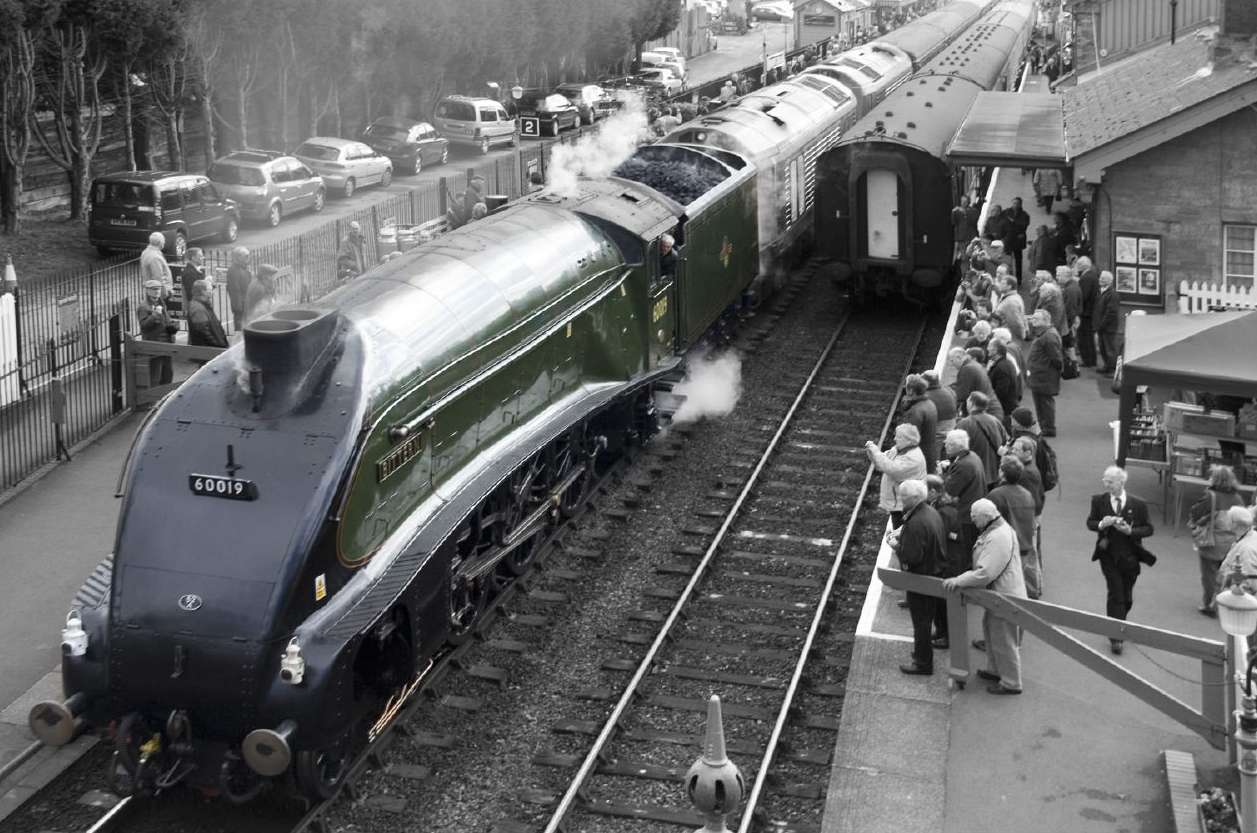
A4 60019 Bittern

Nigel Gresley, the CME of the LNER, was a keen follower of French locomotive practice, particularly the work of André Chapelon and the Nord 'Superpacifics' of Marc de Caso. When Gresley designed his P2 class as successor to his A3s, (Note: i.e. 4472 Flying Scotsman) he took this French work into account and also used a double chimney with Kylchap blastpipes. Two P2s were built initially, 2001 Cock O' The North and then 2002 Earl Marischal, both in 1934. Also following French practice, 2001 was built with poppet valves, and for comparison 2002 kept the conventional piston valves. To avoid problems with smoke obscuring the driver's vision, both were built with wedged tops to their smokebox and wing plates to the upper sides of it, as had been used for 10000. With the sharper exhaust of the poppet valve-equipped 2001, this was successful and smoke was projected upwards, clear of the cab windows. 2002 had a softer exhaust though and gave trouble, until it was rebuilt with additional smoke deflectors, spaced about 18 inches parallel to the existing wing plates. Both locomotives were considered successful, but 2002 had the edge for efficiency, put down to the smaller volumes within the valve chest. (Note: It was a perennial problem for the design of poppet valves to not leave excessive 'dead' space around them.) When the further members of the P2 class were built, they followed 2002 with piston valves and the extra smoke deflectors.

The first of the A4 class reverted to a single chimney and a conventional blastpipe. They had the greatest attention paid to their gas flow generally, both the inlet and exhaust sides. With the P2s, there had been a tendency for an excess of draught, when working hard at a long cut-off, enough to lift the fire. To avoid this, the A4s used a 'jumper top' on their blastpipe, a loose ring which rose under the influence of a strong blast jet, increasing the effective nozzle diameter and so reducing the drawing effect of the blast. This device could not be applied to either a double chimney, nor to a Kylala blastpipe, but it is not clear if that was the only reason for the simplified single blastpipe.

4468 Mallard the 28th of the A4s was built with a double chimney and Kylchap blastpipes in 1938. This was considered successful and so the final three of the class, built a few months later, were also built with them. The entire class was refitted similarly in the 1950s, together with some of the A3s.

Peppercorn's A2 pacifics were built, post-war, with similar double Kylchap blastpipes.

=== LMS Jubilee ===
Five members of the LMS Jubilee class were experimentally fitted with double chimneys at different times. The first was 5684 Jutland, a double chimney with Kylchap petticoats in 1937. This improved both the steaming capacity and also reduced coal consumption, although it was removed after a year owing to problems with the excessive draught causing spark-throwing from the chimney and a build-up of excess smokebox ash. 5742 Connaught and 5553 Canada were then fitted with plain double chimneys in 1940, which was removed from Canada after a short time, but which Connaught carried until 1955.

As part of experiments at Rugby test plant, 45722 Defence was fitted with a double chimney from 1956 to 1957. In 1961 a double exhaust was fitted to 45596 Bahamas which carried it through withdrawal and into preservation. Two further engines, 5735 Comet and 5736 Phoenix were rebuilt with a 2A taper boiler and double chimney in 1942. They were to have been a prototype for the rebuilding of the entire class but, in the end, the only Jubilees so to be treated. All the Royal Scot class were rebuilt along similar lines as were many of the Fowler Patriot locos.

=== LMS Black 5 ===
LMS 'Black 5' 4767 was completed on the last day of the LMS, 31 December 1947. It was unique amongst the 842-strong class in that it featured outside Stephenson link motion in addition to other experimental features; a double chimney, Timken roller bearings throughout and electric lighting. These modifications were part of a series of experiments by George Ivatt to improve the already excellent Stanier-designed Black 5. The double chimney was removed in 1953, owing to the already-good performance of the standard chimney and problems with the softer blast of the double chimney not clearing smoke away from the cab so well. 4765 and 4766 had also trialled a similar double chimney, but with the standard Walschaerts valvegear.

Some of the first BR-built Black 5s were built with Caprotti valvegear. A batch of twenty, 44738-44757, were built, of which the last three also had double chimneys. The boilers of the Caprotti engines were raised by 2 inches, further reducing the clearance for the chimney height. The Caprotti valve boxes were arranged with the 6.25 inches (159 mm) inlet valves on the outside, fed by large and prominent steam pipes, and the 7 inches (180 mm) exhaust valves on the inside. The large clearance volume which was unavoidable within the valve chest of the Caprotti's poppet valves had a similar effect to a long lead on the valve setting. In contrast to the Stephenson engine, (Note: The variable lead of the Stephenson link valvegear gave a long lead when notched up to a short cutoff and was known to climb hills well but not to run so well at speed) this led to these engines performing well at speed but poorly for climbing. Although the intention for trialling the Caprotti valve gear had been to reduce maintenance, coal consumption was still important. These engines were considered as hungrier for coal than usual as the audibly sharp exhaust bark had an effect on the firebox draught. The double chimney examples though had a softer bark and so consumed less.

A second batch of two more Caprotti-fitted engines was tried in 1951, 44686 and 44687. These were of a different design, with an improved mechanical drive to the camboxes, and both with double chimneys. To reduce the 'dead-space' volume within the valve chest, the exhaust valves were reduced in size to now be the same as the inlets. The mechanical drive design was considered successful and was copied for the few later Caprotti engines built for the BR Standard classes. The behaviour of good high-speed performance but a lack of power with low cutoffs was the same as the other engines though. All the Caprotti engines kept their double chimneys and it was noticeable that their still-staccato exhaust had no trouble in lifting smoke clear of the cab.

=== Great Western King class ===
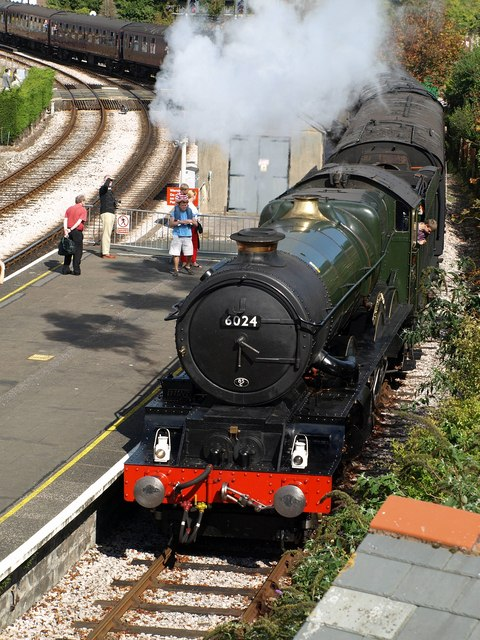
King Edward I

In September 1955, GWR King class 6015 King Richard III was fitted with a double chimney for trials. These were successful and so the whole class was refitted with them. Some of the Castle class were similarly refitted. Tests with a dynamometer car in hauling the Cornish Riviera in 1956 did not show an evident increase in performance, but did show an 8% improvement in the efficiency of coal consumption. Water consumption remained constant, indicating that this was an improvement in combustion and heat transfer, rather than the reduction in engine exhaust back pressure, indicated by some other tests.

=== British Railways Standard classes ===
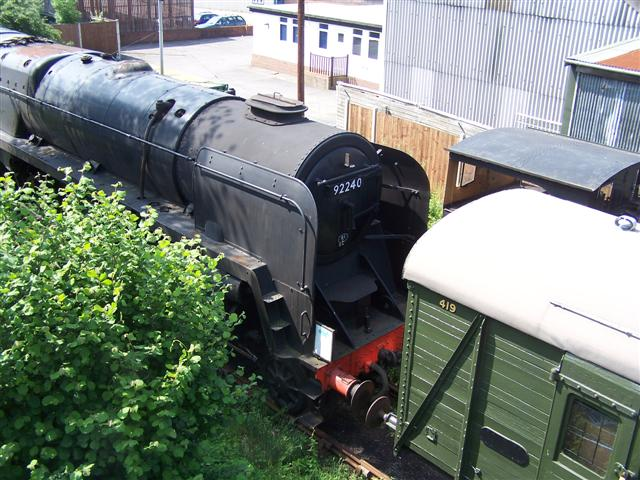
92240

The BR Standards had been designed from the outset with their draughting based on the earlier work of S.O. Ell. Despite this, some of the classes steamed poorly, notably the Class 4 4-6-0. In 1957, 75029 was successfully fitted with a double chimney, leading to its adoption across many of the class.

At the same time, there was also a proposal to test a Giesl ejector on the 9F (Note: Fitted to 9F 92250, later converted to a double chimney.) Possibly as a comparison for this, 92178 was built with a double chimney. The double chimney was so successful that it was adopted as standard for all 9F built from 92183 onwards, (Note: The double chimney 9Fs were 92165–92167 (stoker-fitted, as built), 92178 (first experiment), 92183–92250 (as built) and 92000–92002, 92005, 92006 (modified)) including the three fitted with a mechanical stoker.

==== Duke of Gloucester ====
The BR Standard class 8 Duke of Gloucester was the last of the BR Standard classes to be designed, as the need to build any more of such large express passenger locomotives had initially been rejected. This led to it ignoring one of the design principles of the Standard classes and rather than two cylinders with outside Walschaerts valvegear it instead used three cylinders and Caprotti valvegear, with cam-actuated poppet valves. The Caprotti's valves opened fully more rapidly than piston valves, giving a sharp exhaust bite. The Caprotti company had recommended the use of a Kylchap blastpipe, to counter the adverse effects of this, but this had been ignored in favour of a Swindon-designed conventional double chimney, based on their experience with the King class. Given the sharpness of the blast, these Swindon principles had produced a relatively small blastpipe, with a double chimney of similarly small proportions.

In service, Duke of Gloucester performed infamously poorly, with a reputation for poor steaming. It had a short service life, as a combination of both the rapid withdrawal of steam traction on British Rail and also its poor performance and a reluctance to expend effort in solving this.

Duke of Gloucester was rescued from Barry scrapyard and an extensive restoration was required. During this restoration, the boiler draughting and ashpan air supply were both examined and found to be unexpectedly restrictive. These were assumed to be the root causes of the poor performance, which was borne out by the improved performance after both were remedied. Although the choke size of the chimneys was in proportion to the blastpipe, their overall size was a fraction of comparably sized boilers on the Merchant Navy pacifics and the A2 pacifics. Restoration involved constructing a pair of Kylchap blastpipes and chimney flue chokes. As well as improving draughting, these blastpipes also reduced back pressure on the cylinders, further improving efficiency.

== United States ==
=== Union Pacific Railroad ===
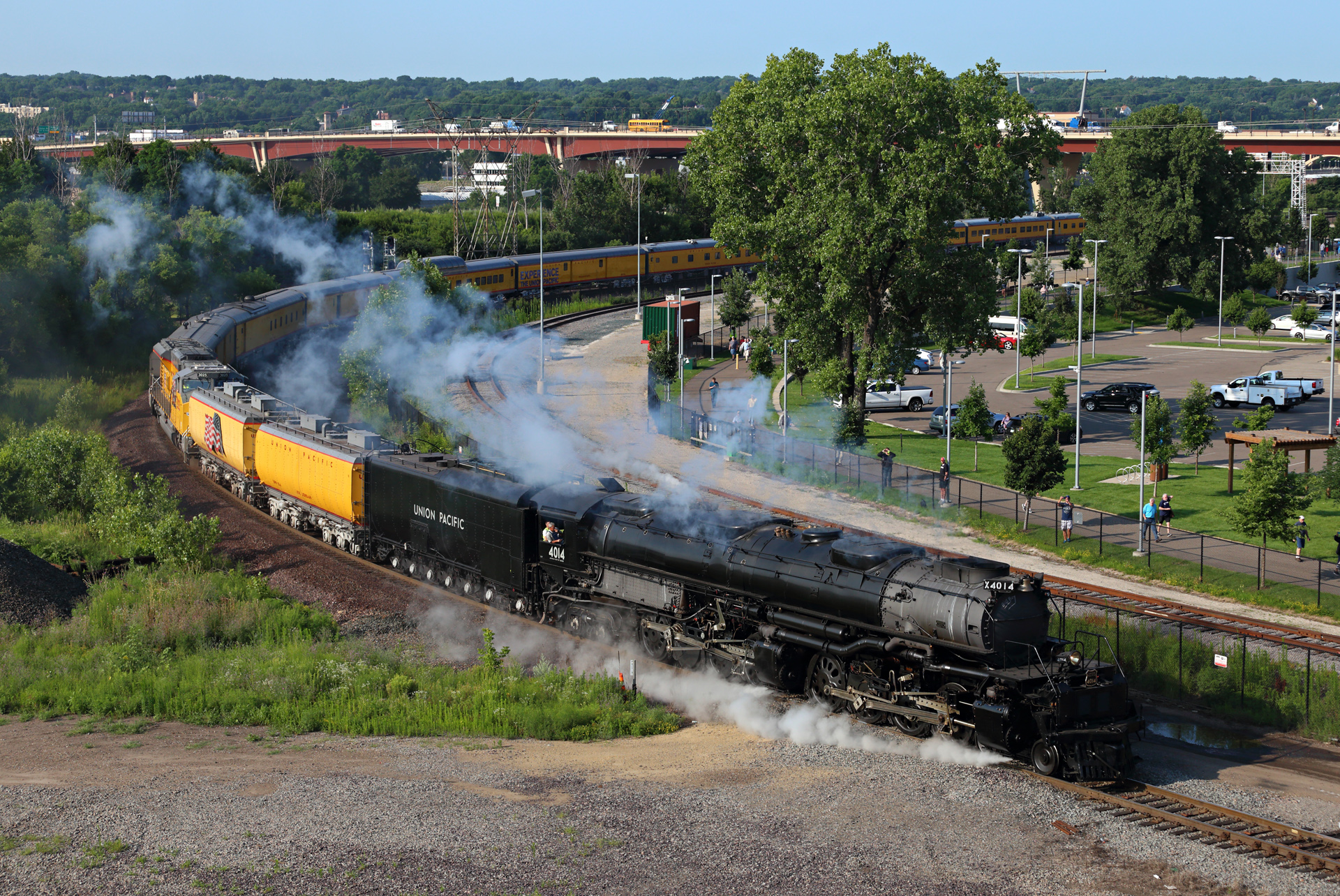
Union Pacific No. 4014, Union Depot

Several late steam era designs on the Union Pacific Railroad, particularly those designed during Otto Jabelmann's time as the railroad's chief mechanical officer; used double smokestacks. The FEF-3, the third and final iteration of the Union Pacific FEF Series were all built new with double stacks. Like their British contemporaries, the double stacks caused issues in creating massive amounts of smoke which could block the engineer's view, as such the FEF-3's were soon equipped with elephant ear style smoke deflectors. Smoke deflectors would later be placed on all the other FEF locomotives, including those without double chimneys. One of the railroad's FEF-2s, No. 831, was fitted with an experimental triple chimney.

Other Union Pacific designs to get double stacks were the late-era articulated locomotives built for the railroad, including the final group of 1942 built Union Pacific Challenger locomotives and the entire run of Union Pacific Big Boy locomotives. While some Challenger and Big Boy locomotives were equipped with smoke deflectors, smoke was not as problematic on them as it was on the FEF class due to their much longer boilers. A handful of the double chimney equipped Challengers were diverted to the Denver and Rio Grande Western Railroad, from which they would later serve on the Clinchfield Railroad. The operational locomotives of the modern Union Pacific Steam Program, UP 844, UP 4014 and the now retired UP 3985 all retained their double chimneys.

=== Pennsylvania Railroad ===
Double stacks were a common feature on several of the PRR's duplex locomotive classes and other experimental designs in the late steam era. Pennsylvania Railroad class S1 a lone prototype 6-4-4-6 used a double stack as well as the Pennsylvania Railroad class Q2 a 4-4-6-4 duplexes which had a total of 26 locomotives built. The Pennsylvania Railroad class T1 a duplex class with 52 locomotives produced also carried double stacks. Pennsylvania Railroad class S2 used a unique quadruple stack system as part of its experimental steam turbine design. This one off engine introduced in 1944 was scrapped by 1952.

Pennsylvania Railroad 5550 a new build based on the T1 class is currently underway being built by the T1 Steam Locomotive Trust. As of 2021, the engine's boiler is being constructed and when complete will contain a double stack like the original locomotives.

=== Southern Pacific Railroad ===
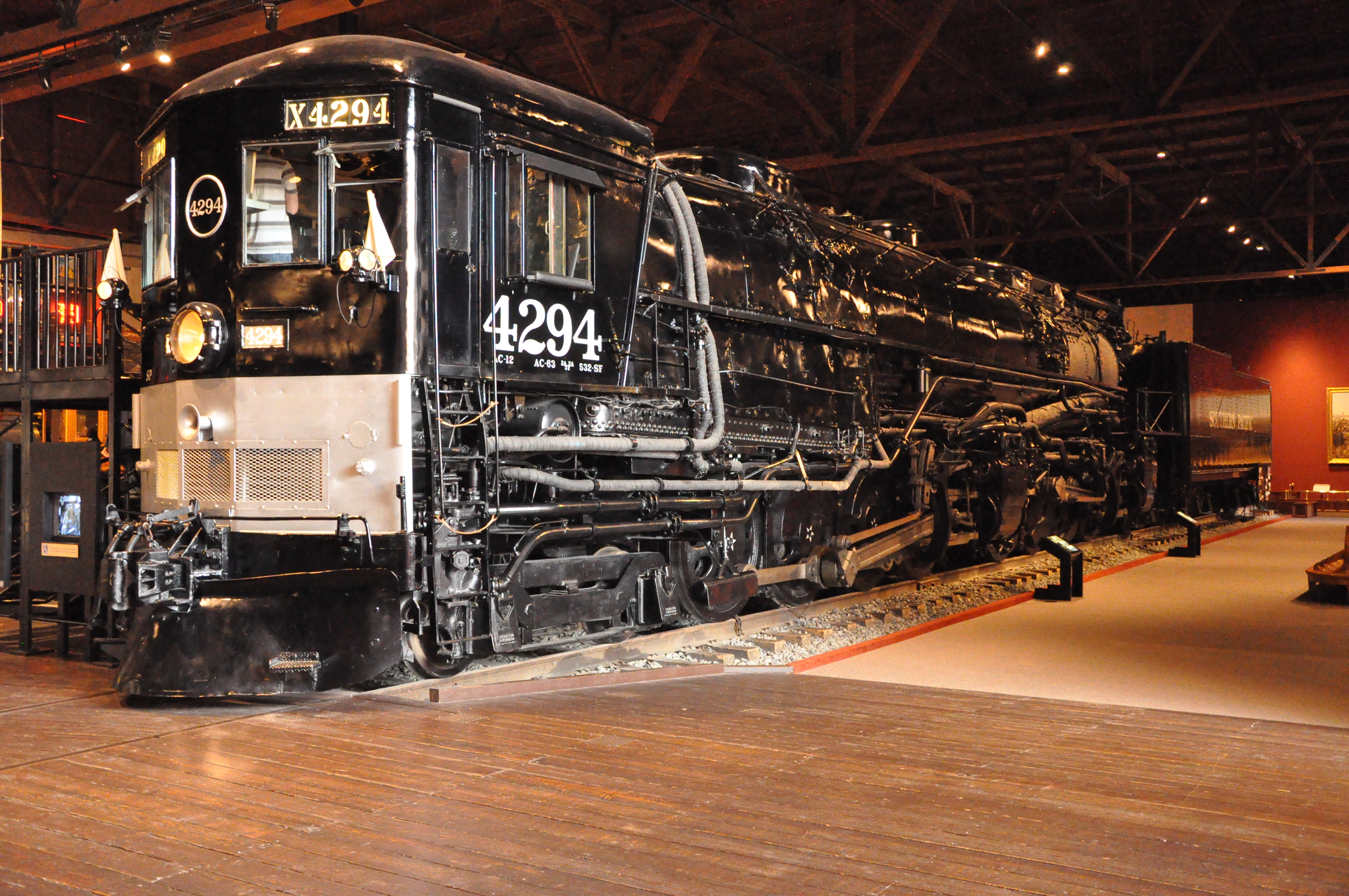
SP 4294 in Sacramento

Several of the Southern Pacific Railroad's larger engines such as the Southern Pacific class AC-9 and the Southern Pacific class AC-12 all used double stack systems. These were also equipped with "stack splitters" a design feature going back to Southern Pacific's single stack Mallet's that reduced the speed of the exhaust to prevent damaging the roofs of snow sheds. Several of these engines were built with a Cab forward 4-8-8-2 design, placing the locomotive cab on the forward part of the engine to prevent asphyxiation during long tunnel and snow shed segments on the Southern Pacific. Southern Pacific 4294 the only survivor of Southern Pacific's cab forward locomotives is preserved in Sacramento, California at the California State Railroad Museum.

== South America ==
=== L.D.Porta's Argentina ===
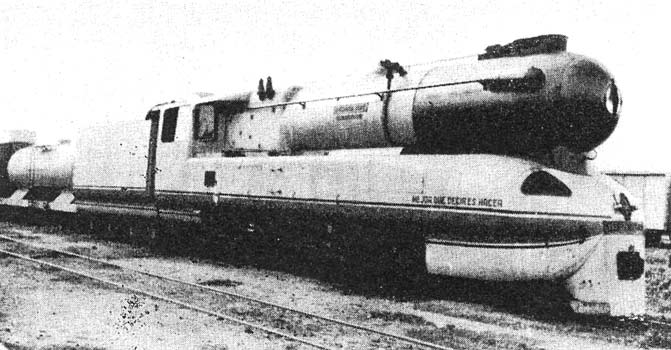
Steam locomotive Argentina, designed by Porta - 1969

Livio Dante Porta's experimental meter gauge locomotive Argentina was a 1948 rebuild of a former 4-6-2 into a 4-8-0. The locomotive incorporated a double chimney in addition to other improvements intended to improve steam flow and fuel consumption. Porta's exhaust designs ultimately evolved into the Lempor ejector. The experimental locomotive was a success, and other locomotives would be modified to include Porta's upgrades although not many received double chimneys like Argentina had. In the 1970s Porta designed a large locomotive to fit the North American Plate C loading gauge that was based on Argentina's design, including double chimneys. That locomotive was never built. Argentina was preserved in the Mate de Luna station in San Miguel de Tucuman, its current status is unknown with some reports suggesting it has since been scrapped.

== South Africa ==
=== South African Class 26 4-8-4 ===
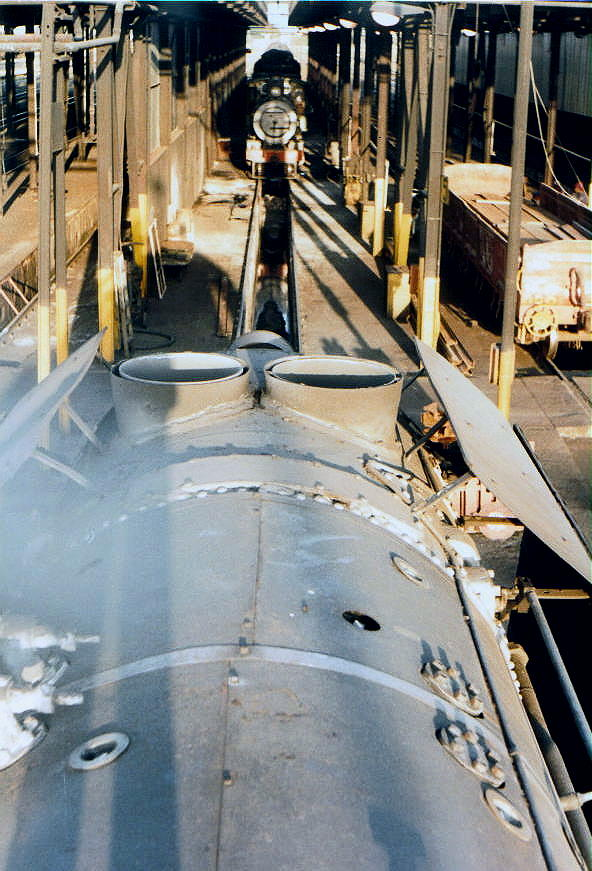
SAR Class 25NC 4354 "Red Devil" with double chimney system

Following on L.D. Porta's design methodology, the South African Class 26 4-8-4 L.D. Porta (better known via its nickname Red Devil) was equipped with a double chimney system outfitted with Lempor ejectors along with a Gas Producer Combustion System to improve efficiency.
