= BR Standard Class 5 73129 =

Preserved British steam locomotive

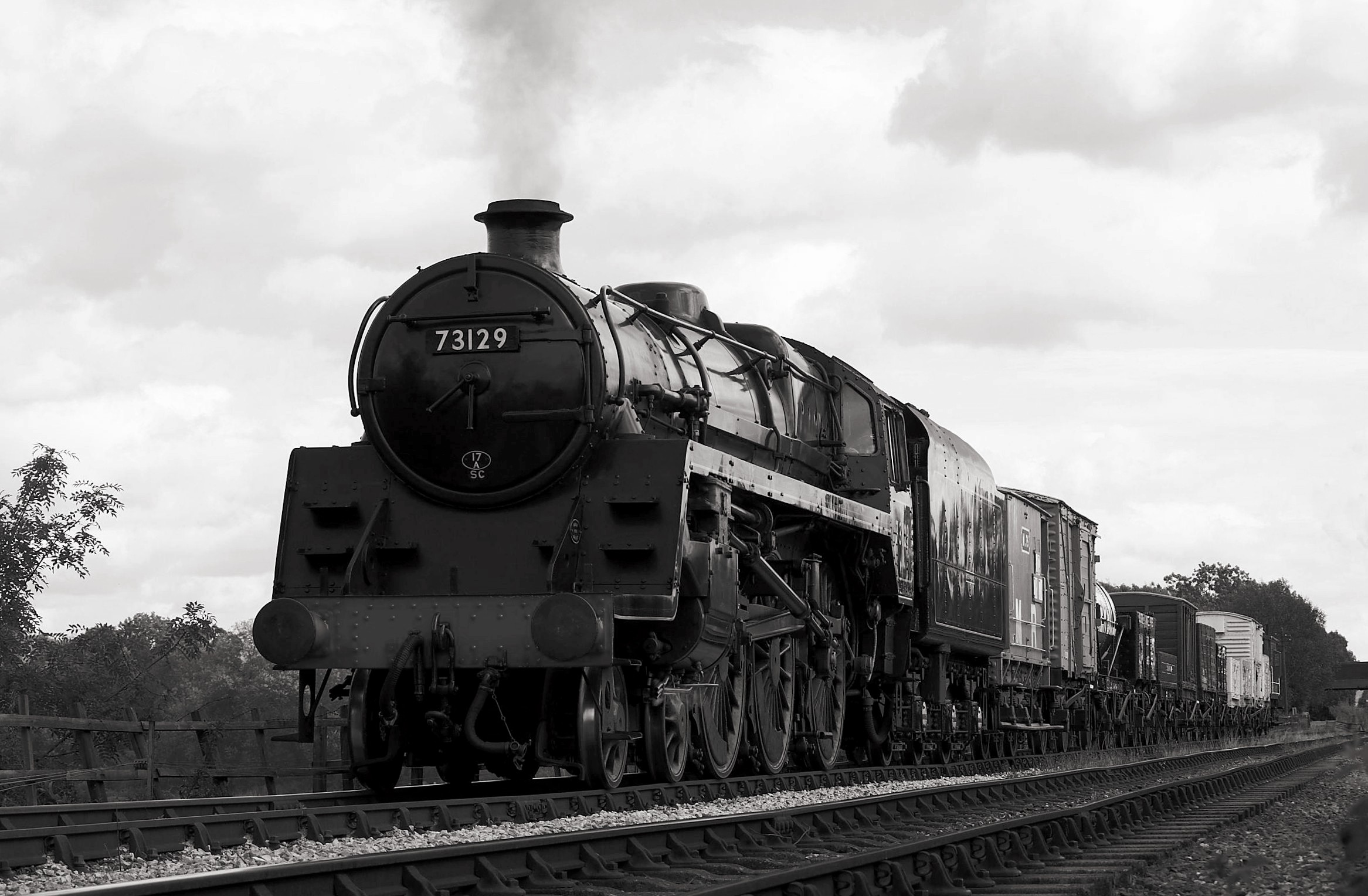
73129 at Midland Railway – Butterley

British Railways Standard Class 5 No. 73129 is a preserved British steam locomotive. It is the only surviving Standard Class 5 built by British Railways which was fitted with Caprotti valve gear.

== Locomotive history ==
73129 was outshopped from Derby Works in August 1956, and was one of the last locomotives to be built there. It was one of 30 built fitted with Caprotti valve gear. Originally allocated at Shrewsbury Shed (which required the fitting of GWR style lamp brackets), it was later transferred to Patricroft Shed (near Manchester) in 1958. It spent the rest of its working life there until it was stored at Patricroft from June to November 1967. It was officially withdrawn from traffic on 2 December 1967.

During 73129's working life, it covered roughly 198,359 miles - 35,814 of those in 1957.

== Barry Scrapyard ==
In February 1968, 73129 was sent to Woodham Brothers scrapyard in Barry, Vale of Glamorgan, South Wales.

In 1972, 73129 was purchased by the Midland Railway Project Group. Preparation work for the transportation of the locomotive to Butterley was undertaken at Woodham Brothers with small working parties. In addition, many spare parts were acquired from other locomotives, especially 73129's neighbour at Barry, 73096, which is now itself preserved. Parts were also taken from the only other remaining Caprotti valve geared locomotive at Woodham Brothers, 71000 "Duke of Gloucester", which is also now preserved.

Whilst stored at Woodham Brothers, the original BR1B tender (1417) was sold to a steel works for conversion into an ingot carrier. 73129 currently has tender number 1043. It is of the same BR1B type, but has no water pick-up apparatus, as it was from a Southern Region based engine 75079 where there was no need for the apparatus.

== Transportation to Butterley ==
On 6 January 1973 a convoy from Barry hauled by a British Rail Class 46 number (D)157 took 73129 on part of its journey to Derby Works. The convoy also included 7819 "Hinton Manor", 4141 and 5164, 4930 "Hagley Hall", a Stanier 4000 gallon tender and a brake van.

Assistance out of Woodham Brothers scrapyard was given by a Class 37 diesel (or English Electric Type 3 as they were known) 6978. At Kidderminster whilst dropping off the locomotives for the Severn Valley Railway the motive power was changed to a Class 25 (or Sulzer Type 2) 7655.

73129 was left at Derby Works as a temporary home. By early 1975, 73129 along with Jinty 16440 (47357) had arrived at Butterley.

== Restoration ==
Restoration was started on a limited scale on 73129 shortly after the locomotive arrived at the then Midland Railway Centre, now Midland Railway - Butterley, in 1975 although work began to tail off in around 1985.

Another small attempt to restart the restoration was tried in 1992 although minimal work was carried out due to lack of financial and human resources.

In late 1993, restoration began in earnest. This took over a decade. The first fire in 73129's firebox since 1967 was lit at 3.25 pm on 22 February 2004. Steam locomotives 92214, 80098, 47357 and Peckett 1163 "Whitehead" were all in attendance, all whistling when smoke first appeared from 73129's chimney.

== See also ==
- Class 5s, 44738-57
