= BR Caprotti Black Fives =

British Railways locomotives

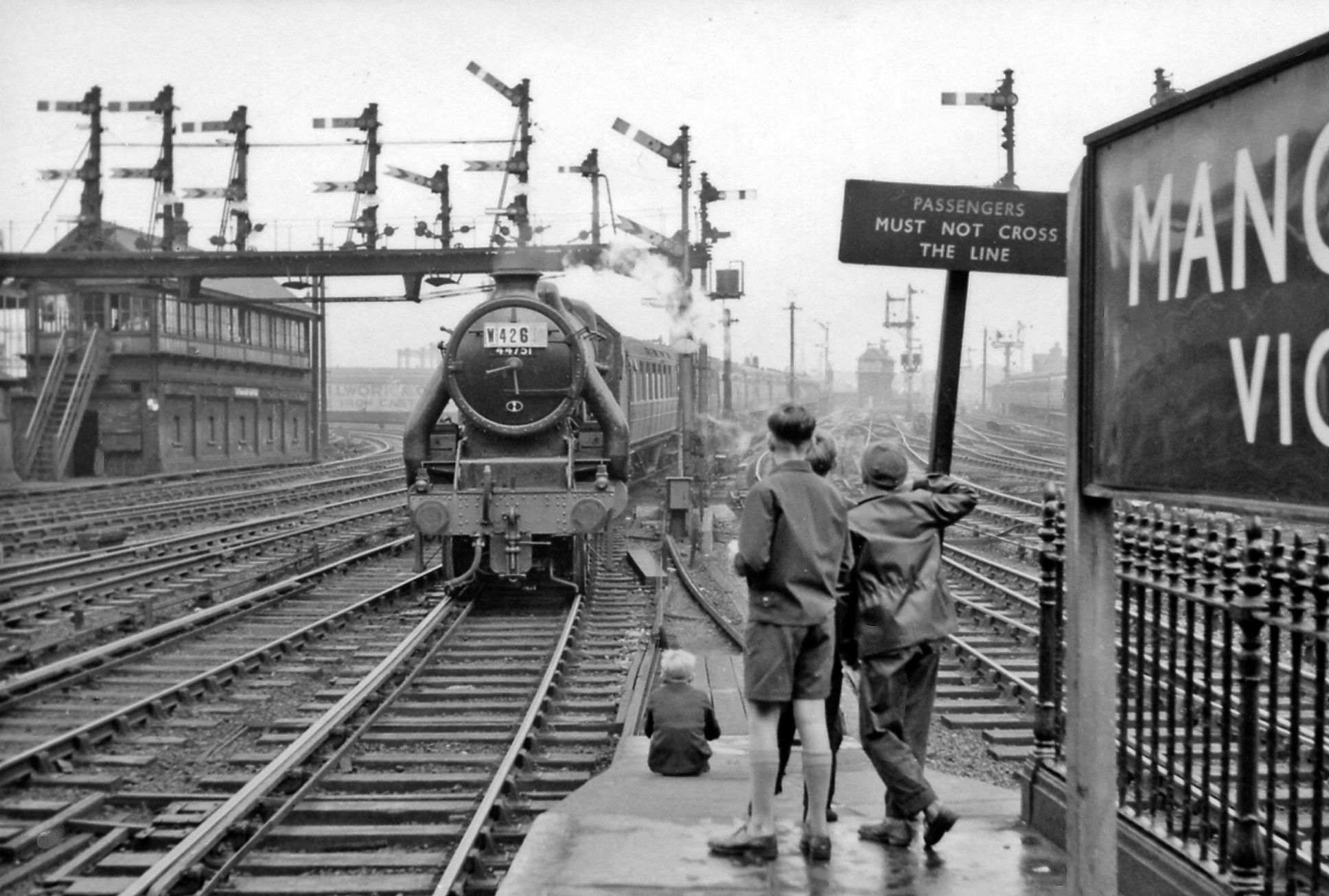
44751 at Manchester Victoria in 1960

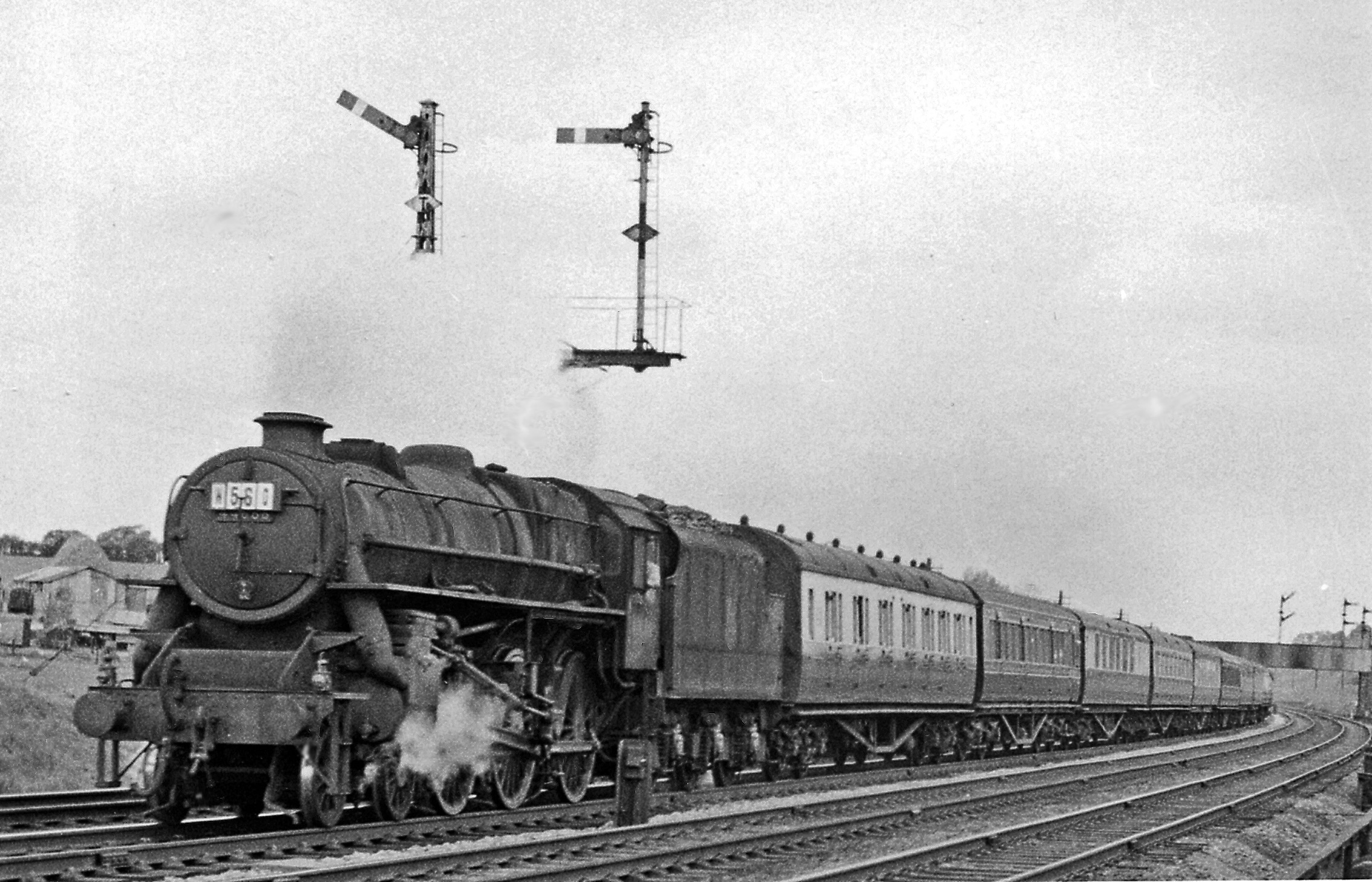
44686 with a Manchester-London Cup Final Special approaching Bletchley in 1957

British Railways built twenty locomotives of the LMS Stanier Black Five type, fitted with Caprotti valve gear, in 1948; the BR Caprotti Black Fives. These were numbered 44738-57, 44686 and 44687. The Black Fives had been fitted with Walschaerts valve gear as standard. In 1947, as part of an experimental programme by George Ivatt to try to improve the already good design, (4)4767 was built with Stephenson link motion. The Caprotti-fitted Black Fives were part of the same programme.

== Caprotti valve gear ==
The Caprotti valve gear was driven by a single shaft, located between the frames, and driven from the leading coupled axle by a bevel gear. The reversing gear was operated by a screw wheel requiring multiple turns to go from full forward to full reverse; in this it differed from the standard Caprotti version, which only required one turn. It was designed to operate in the same way as the reversing gear on the Walschaerts-fitted Black Fives. However reversing between intermediate cutoff positions could only be achieved by winding to the full-gear position in the new direction and then winding back.

The success of the British Caprotti valve gear lead to its fitting to the final batch of thirty BR Standard Class 5s and also to the solitary BR Standard Class 8 71000 Duke of Gloucester. One of the Caprotti Standard Fives (73129) survives, as does The Duke.

== History ==
The first batch of Caprotti Black Fives, M4748–M4750, emerged from Crewe in February 1948. A second batch, M4751–M4752, entered traffic in March 1948, followed by nos. 44754 and 44755 in April, 44756 in June and 44757 in December. The prefix M, used by the London Midland Region of British Railways, was soon dropped and M4748 to M4752 were renumbered 44748 to 44752 between June 1948 and June 1949. All of these locomotives were fitted with Timken roller bearings throughout. The last three of these, 44755-7, were also fitted with a double chimney.

Between May and August 1948 a further ten Caprotti Black Fives were built, nos. 44738–44747. These had plain wheel bearings throughout.

The last two of the 842 LMS Stanier Black Fives, numbers 44686 and 44687 were constructed by British Railways at Horwich Works in 1951. The two locomotives cost £20,642 each, over £5,000 more than a contemporary standard Class Five. This was in part because of the high cost of development for a type of which only two examples were built. For much of their lives they were allocated to Longsight. They were fitted with Caprotti valve gear, raised running plates without splashers, a double chimney and SKF roller bearings on all axles. Caprotti valve gear had previously been fitted to a batch of twenty Black Fives, nos. 44738-57, built in 1948. The valve gear on these was driven by one drive-line between the frames, driven from the leading coupled axle. 44686 and 44687 were fitted with a modified form of valve gear, with an external shaft on each side, driven by a worm gear mounted on a flycrank attached to the driving axle. The British Caprotti valve gear was a new development of Caprotti valve gear by the Associated Locomotive Engineers, under the leadership of L.A. Daniels.

The twenty locomotives incorporated a number of modifications to the original design. Unlike similar rotary poppet valve gear by Lentz and Franklin, the cam boxes on Caprotti gear are mounted vertically to the cylinders, rather than horizontally. This necessitated the boiler be raised by 2 in (5 cm) to 8 ft 11 in (2.7 m). The smokebox was extended by 4 in (10 cm) and the chimney moved forward to allow room for the Caprotti valve box and associated steam and exhaust pipes. The large steam pipes are an obvious visual recognition feature. The locomotives fitted with Timken bearings had large split cannon-type axleboxes between the frames. To allow room for the firebox between the middle and rear axleboxes the spacing between the driving and rear coupled wheels was increased from 8 ft (2.4 m) to 8 ft 4 in (2.5 m). This gave a longer wheelbase of 27 ft 6 in (8.4 m) as against the 27 ft 2 in (8.3 m) of the standard locomotives. The locomotives with plain bearings also had the longer wheelbase. All locomotives had a modified cab and a lowered running plate, necessitating the use of splashers over the wheels.

In service, the Caprotti Black Fives were slow in acceleration, but were powerful at high speeds, and coasted freely. The slow acceleration was caused by inefficiencies in the drive and valve events. These were addressed in the design of the last two Black Fives to be built, 44686-7, which emerged in 1951 with Caprotti valve gear driven by two external shafts on either side of the locomotives. The exposed driveshafts were easier to access and negated the need for splashers, while the high running board allowed clearance for the valve boxes and subsequent sharp angle of the shafts, Later BR built thirty of the closely related BR Standard class 5 with Caprotti valve gear, and it was also employed on the standard class 8 71000 Duke of Gloucester.

In the early 1960s both 44686 and 44687 worked off Southport shed (code 27C) on passenger trains from Southport to Manchester and Rochdale via Bolton. Other non-standard LMSR 5MTs were at Southport including LMSR Caprottis and the unique Stephenson Link machine 44767.

== Withdrawal ==
44686 was withdrawn in October 1965. 44687 was withdrawn in January 1966.

== Bibliography ==
- Rowledge, J. W. P.; Reed, Brian (1984). The Stanier 4-6-0s of the LMS. Newton Abbot: David & Charles. ISBN 0-7153-7385-4.
