= BR Standard Class 8 =

One-off three-cylinder 4-6-2 locomotive

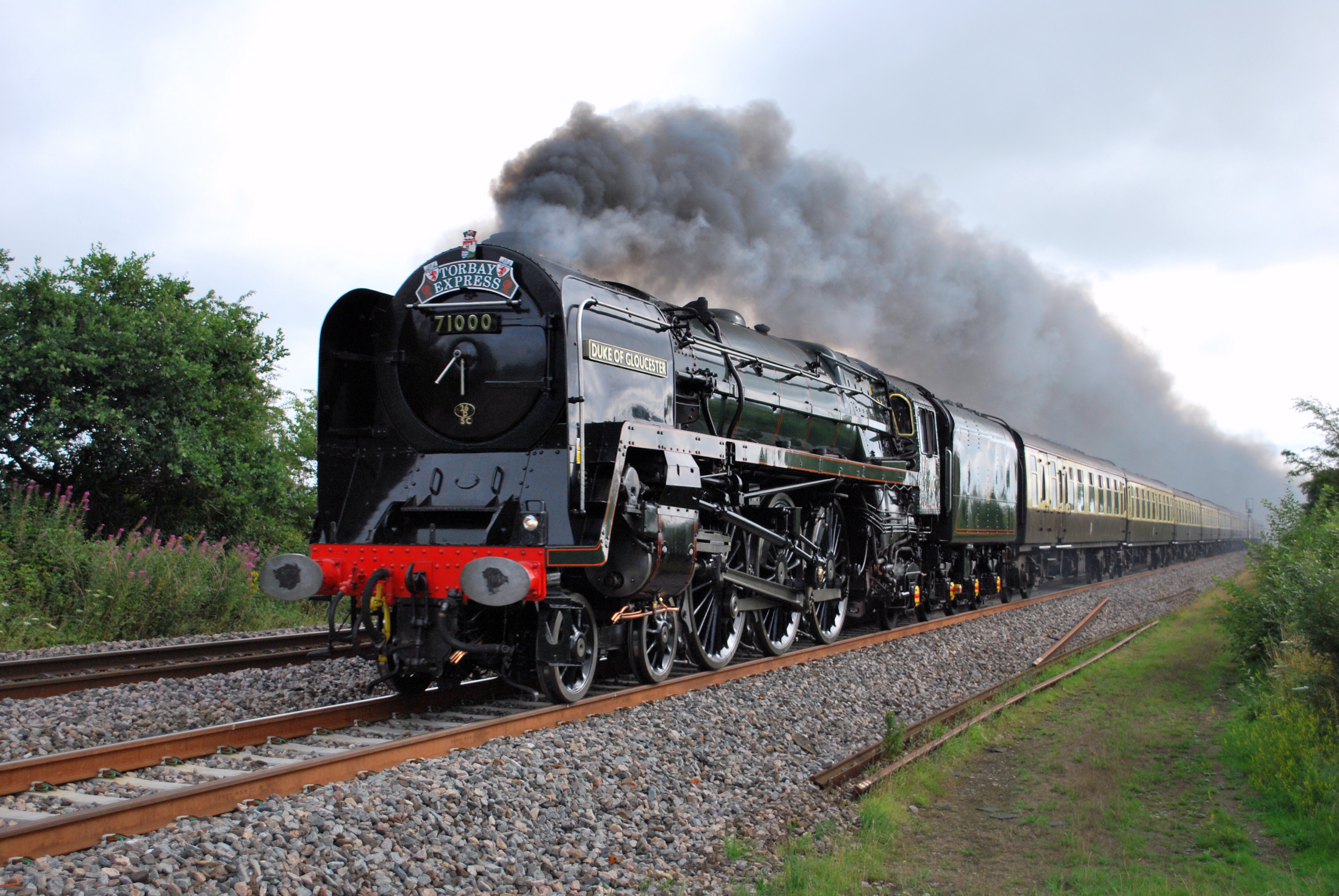
- The sole Standard Class 8 (71000 Duke of Gloucester) locomotive crossing the Somerset Levels, 2010
Type and origin
- Power type: Steam
- Designer: Robert Riddles
- Builder: BR Crewe Works
- Build date: April 1954
- Total produced: 1
Specifications
- Configuration
  - Whyte: 4-6-2
  - UIC: 2′C1′h3
- Gauge: 4 ft 8 1/2 in (1,435 mm) standard gauge
- Leading dia.: 3 ft 0 in (0.914 m)
- Driver dia.: 6 ft 2 in (1.880 m)
- Trailing dia.: 3 ft 3 1/2 in (1.003 m)
- Length: 67 ft 8 in (20.62 m)
- Width: 9 ft 0 in (2.74 m)
- Height: 13 ft 0 1/2 in (3.98 m)
- Axle load: 22 long tons (25 short tons; 22 t)
- Adhesive weight: 66 long tons (74 short tons; 67 t)
- Loco weight: 101.25 long tons (113.40 short tons; 102.87 t)
- Tender weight: BR1E: 55.5 long tons (62.2 short tons; 56.4 t); BR1J: 53.7 long tons (60.1 short tons; 54.6 t)
- Tender type: 1954–1958: BR1E; 1958–1962: BR1J
- Fuel type: Coal
- Fuel capacity: 10 long tons (11 short tons; 10 t)
- Water cap.: BR1E: 4,725 imp gal (21,480 L; 5,674 US gal); BR1J: 4,325 imp gal (19,660 L; 5,194 US gal)
- Firebox
  - Grate area: 48.6 sq ft (4.52 m^{2})
- Boiler: BR13
- Boiler pressure: 250 psi (1.72 MPa)
- Heating surface
  - Firebox: 226 sq ft (21.0 m^{2})
  - Tubes and flues: 2,264 sq ft (210.3 m^{2})
- Superheater
  - Heating area: 677 sq ft (62.9 m^{2})
- Cylinders: Three
- Cylinder size: 18 in × 28 in (457 mm × 711 mm)
- Valve gear: Caprotti valve gear
- Valve type: Poppet valves
Performance figures
- Tractive effort: 39,080 lbf (173.84 kN)
- Factor of adh.: 3.78
Career
- Operators: British Railways
- Power class: 8P
- Numbers: 71000
- Locale: London Midland Region
- Withdrawn: December 1962
- Disposition: Preserved, operational, mainline certified

71000 passing St Andrew's Junction

The BR Standard Class 8 is a one-off 4-6-2 "Pacific" type steam locomotive designed by Robert Riddles for use by British Railways. Only a single locomotive, the prototype, was constructed, which was named Duke of Gloucester. Constructed at Crewe Works in 1954, the Duke, as it is popularly known, was a replacement for the destroyed LMS Princess Royal Class locomotive 46202 Princess Anne, which was involved in the Harrow and Wealdstone rail crash of 1952.

The Duke was based on the BR Standard Class 7 Britannia design. It incorporated three sets of modified Caprotti valve gear, new to British locomotive engineering and more efficient than Walschaerts or Stephenson valve gear. Due to errors made during the original construction of The Duke, it was regarded as a failure by locomotive crews due to its poor steaming characteristics and its heavy fuel consumption. Trials undertaken by British Railways also proved disappointing, revealing problems with the draughting of the locomotive, which caused difficulties in adhering to timetables.

Consequently, the unique locomotive had an operational life of eight years, comparatively short for a British steam locomotive. It was taken to Woodham Brothers scrap yard in Barry, Vale of Glamorgan, South Wales, but was saved from being cut up when it was purchased by a group of railway enthusiasts, who restored it to as-built condition over 13 years. Since then, modifications have been made to the original design, creating one of the most efficient and powerful steam locomotives ever to run in Britain. The locomotive returned to main line use in 2025 following an extensive overhaul.

== Background ==
Riddles had frequently argued the case for the inclusion of a Standard Class 8 Pacific in the standard range of locomotives being introduced by British Railways. However, those proposals were rejected by the Railway Executive on the grounds that attempting to develop a new form of steam motive power was unnecessary because there were enough Standard Class 7 Britannia locomotives already available for use.

However, opportunity came out of adversity when the short-lived rebuild of the former LMS Turbomotive, 46202 Princess Anne was destroyed in the Harrow and Wealdstone rail disaster of 1952. A gap then existed in the roster for locomotives with 8P power classification, for which there was high demand to allow the efficient operation of heavy expresses on the West Coast Main Line between London Euston and Scotland. That gave Riddles the perfect opportunity to press the case for his new design, a prototype of which was duly authorised for construction.

== Design details ==
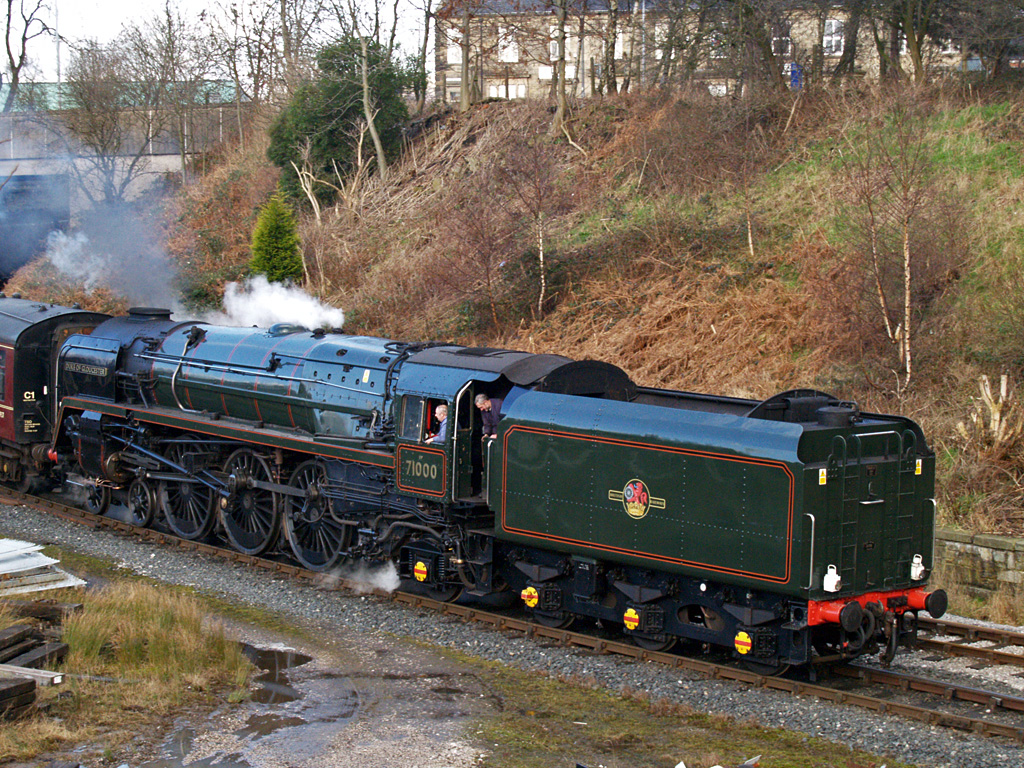
71000 Duke of Gloucester on the East Lancashire Railway, 2009. Note the British Caprotti valve gear.

At first, Riddles wanted to develop an enlarged version of his Standard Class 7 Britannias, because that design still featured a two-cylinder layout. However, the size of the cylinders needed to achieve the 8P power classification would mean that the locomotive was outside the British loading gauge, so a reluctant reversion to the three-cylinder layout ensued. That reluctance was born from experience with the Gresley Pacifics, in which the conjugated valve gear was difficult to maintain due to the middle cylinder being located between the frames. Therefore, an alternative type of valve gear had to be found.

A rotary cam-driven form of Caprotti valve gear was settled on, as developed by Heenan & Froude, using poppet valves. It was based on Italian locomotive practice and allowed precise control of steam admission to the cylinders, as well as improving exhaust flow and boiler draughting when compared to the more conventional Walschaerts and Stephenson valve gear. On paper, that created a free-steaming, hard-working locomotive, capable of hauling heavy loads over long distances, but in practice, fundamental design errors and undetected deviations from the drawings made during construction combined to prevent the locomotive from achieving its expected performance during British Railways ownership.

The main problem was known even when the locomotive was under construction, because L.T. Daniels, the representative of the British Caprotti company, recommended the use of the Kylchap blastpipe, which could have coped with the fierce exhaust blasts experienced with the Caprotti system. A standard double chimney of the Swindon type had already been fabricated in order to cut costs and it had been installed in the smokebox, supposedly before Riddles could do anything about it. As a result, the locomotive's performance suffered, due to the choke area of both the chimney and blastpipe being much too small for the pressure created by the exhaust, which led to poor draughting. Further problems relating to the firebox of the locomotive were only discovered during its restoration, including a poorly dimensioned ashpan, and dampers that were too small, starving the fire of air when operating at speed.

Following the occasional appearance of cracks near the spring brackets of the Britannias and Clans, a substantial re-arrangement took place in that area, which resulted in the locomotive riding on three cast steel "sub-frames" carrying the ten front-most spring brackets, and lengthened spring brackets behind the rear driven axle.

== Construction history ==
The opportunity to create an entire batch of locomotives within the 8P category was declined by the Railway Executive because the design process had been very expensive and complex, so that when the locomotive emerged from Crewe Works in 1954, the construction of similar locomotives was seen as inappropriate, especially given the 1955 Modernisation Plan. As a result, 71000 remained the solitary member of the proposed class of Standard 8P locomotives.

=== Naming the locomotive ===
After emerging from Crewe Works in 1954, the locomotive was named Duke of Gloucester prior to entering revenue-earning service. Had further locomotives been constructed, they would have belonged to the Duke Class, standing alongside the sister locomotives of the Britannia and Clan Classes. Since then, the locomotive has colloquially been referred to by enthusiasts and crews as the Duke.

== Operational details ==
The Duke was highly unpopular with crews in British Railways service, who regarded it as something of a liability due to its poor steam production. Inefficiencies caused by the problems regarding its draughting abilities and firebox design meant that no further examples were constructed. The fact that no effort was made to rectify the problems indicates the change in policy regarding steam locomotives, with the Modernisation Plan coming into operation just as the "Duke" entered service. Based for its entire working life at Crewe North depot, the locomotive was used to haul boat trains on the undemanding North Wales Coast Line between Crewe and Holyhead. All those factors culminated in the locomotive having a short service life of only eight years, being withdrawn from service in 1962. The reputation of the locomotive amongst its crews as being a poor steamer was eventually to disappear, but only after it was rebuilt following its rescue from the scrap yard in 1974.

== Livery and numbering ==
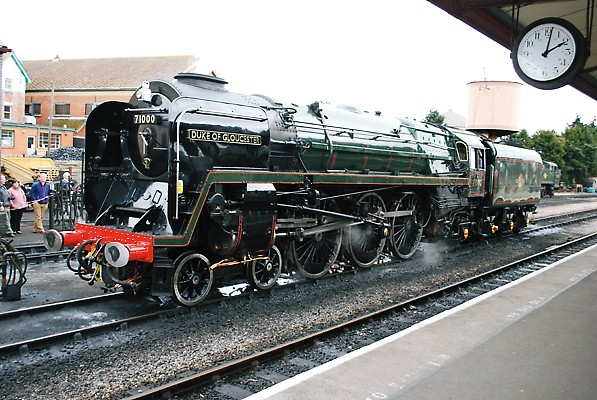
71000 at the terminus of the West Somerset Railway at Minehead, 2010

The livery of the Duke was a continuation of the British Railways standard class practice. The class was given the power classification 8P. Following on from the 'Britannias', the Duke was numbered under the British Railways standard numbering system in the 71xxx series. The "Duke" was given the number 71000, and featured brass nameplates with a black background, located on the smoke deflectors.

== Preservation ==
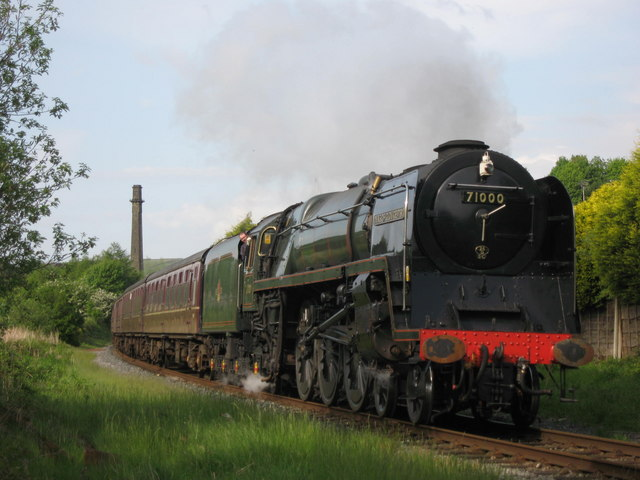
No 71000 Duke of Gloucester on the East Lancashire Railway, 2007

After withdrawal, the Duke was selected for inclusion in the National Railway Museum, but it was later decided that only the cylinder arrangement was of interest. One of the outside cylinders was removed for display at the Science Museum, and the other was removed to restore balance in readiness for scrapping. The locomotive was purchased by Dai Woodham, though it was initially sent to the wrong scrapyard. After being retrieved, the Duke spent seven years in Woodham Brothers scrapyard, before enthusiasts purchased the locomotive in 1974, forming the Duke of Gloucester Steam Locomotive Trust.

Restoration began in earnest on 24 April 1974. With many components missing, including the Caprotti valve gear, it took 13 years of effort on the part of enthusiasts, with assistance in the guise of sponsorships from industry, to return the locomotive to near as-built condition. One of the very few compromises made was replacing the previous steel cylinders with spheroidal graphite iron.

Two significant construction errors were discovered during restoration:

- The chimney was too small compared with other locomotives of similar size, resulting in poor boiler draughting at times of high steam demand.
- The firebed (grate) air inlet dampers had not been built to the drawings and were too small, resulting in poor air supply and inefficient combustion.

Those errors were corrected and the opportunity was taken to incorporate some other improvements, including the previously recommended Kylchap exhaust system, which finally unlocked the locomotive's true potential as a powerful express passenger locomotive. When the "Duke" was first allowed to haul a full load on the main line, it became immediately obvious that the boiler was producing steam at a more efficient rate and that the reborn "Duke" was unrecognisable from the failure experienced under British Railways ownership. With the modifications, the "Duke" is now one of the most powerful steam locomotives ever to run on Britain's railways, past or present (the LMS Coronation Class Pacifics held that title under British Railways auspices - the three cylinder "Duke" never actually achieved the 3000 cylinder horse power figure that was recorded by the four cylinder Princess Coronation Class). Ironically, it is not only more powerful than the English Electric Type 4 diesel locomotives which replaced it directly in service, but also the type 4 and 5 diesel locomotives built to replace the earlier diesels.

In the 1995 "Shap trials" (30 September to 3 October) 71000 broke the record for the fastest northbound ascent and achieved the highest Estimated Drawbar Horsepower (EDHP) figures during the event, its average over the Shap ascent was 2300 EDHP and peak 2803. Coronation class 46229 Duchess of Hamilton generated EDHP figures of 2150 and 2343 respectively. A4 class 60007 Sir Nigel Gresley suffered from poor coal and possible leaking tubes so only achieved an EDHP of 1671 (average) and 1812 (peak).

In preservation, the "Duke" had an impeccably reliable operational record. However, on 9 June 2007, the engine operated a railtour from Preston to Carlisle returning via Settle, where, for operational reasons, the locomotive's start position was changed to Carnforth. A little over 30 miles (48 km) into the journey, the locomotive was stopped at Penrith with leaking tubes in the firebox and removed from the train. It was withdrawn for repairs and returned to service in January 2008.

Because the locomotive now bears little mechanical resemblance to that which operated under British Railways, it has also been used as a test bed, incorporating several other modifications and innovations. They are intended to investigate how much further the locomotive's performance can be enhanced, raising speculation about the capabilities of an entire batch of Standard class 8 "Pacifics" had history been different. As a result, Duke of Gloucester frequently hauled railtours and other passenger-carrying services over the British mainline in preservation until its boiler certificate expired in 2012. After undergoing a heavy overhaul, the locomotive returned to main line operation in 2025.

== Models ==
A ready-to-run model in O scale, produced by Ace Trains, was released in Summer 2019, built to coarse scale standards, which apply mainly to the wheels rather than the model more generally. Uniquely, the model has a representation of working Caprotti valve gear.

The only well-documented construction of working live-steam scale model of Duke of Gloucester in Model Engineer magazine was by Denis Evans, of Blackpool, England. Beginning in the 1966, and using original drawings from British Railways and Associated Locomotive Equipment (a subsidiary of Heenan & Froude), Evans built three Dukes, with fully working Caprotti valve gear, first in 7¼ inch gauge, and then 5 inch and 3½ inch gauges. The 7¼ inch gauge Duke won awards at the 48th Model Engineer Exhibition in 1979, as did his 3½ inch gauge locomotive at the 61st Model Engineer Exhibition in 1992.
