= LMS Stanier Class 5 4-6-0 4767 =

Preserved British steam locomotive

LMS 4767
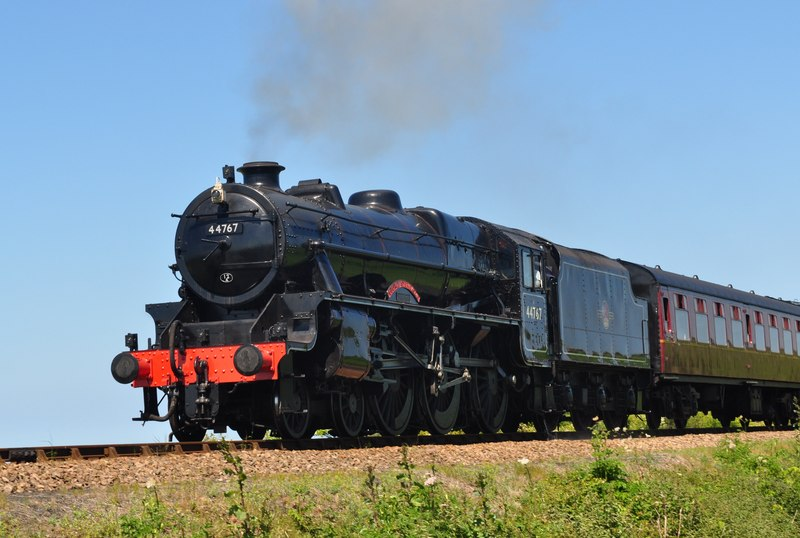
- 44767 on a train to Weybourne on the North Norfolk Railway in June 2010
Type and origin
- Power type: Steam
- Designer: William Stanier
- Builder: Crewe Works
- Build date: Dec 1947
Specifications
- Configuration
  - Whyte: 4-6-0
- Gauge: 4 ft 8 1/2 in (1,435 mm)
- Leading dia.: 3 ft 3 1/2 in (1.003 m)
- Driver dia.: 6 ft 0 in (1.829 m)
- Length: 63 ft 7 3/4 in (19.40 m)
- Fuel type: Coal
- Fuel capacity: 9 long tons (9.1 t; 10.1 short tons)
- Water cap.: 4,000 imp gal (18,000 L; 4,800 US gal)
- Firebox
  - Grate area: 28 1/2 sq ft (2.65 m^{2})
- Boiler: LMS type 3C
- Boiler pressure: 225 lbf/in^{2} (1.55 MPa)
- Cylinders: Two, outside
- Cylinder size: 18 1/2 in × 28 in (470 mm × 711 mm)
- Valve gear: Stephenson link motion
- Valve type: Piston valves
- Loco brake: Vacuum
- Safety systems: AWS, TPWS, OTMR, GSMR
Performance figures
- Tractive effort: 25,455 lbf (113.23 kN)
Career
- Operators: London, Midland and Scottish Railway; → British Railways
- Power class: LMS: 5P5F; BR: 5MT
- Axle load class: BR: Route Availability 7
- Withdrawn: December 1967
- Current owner: David Smith
- Disposition: Under Overhaul

London Midland and Scottish Railway (LMS) Stanier Black Five, LMS number 4767, BR number 44767 is a preserved steam locomotive. In preservation it has carried the name George Stephenson though it never bore this in service with British Railways.

== Service ==
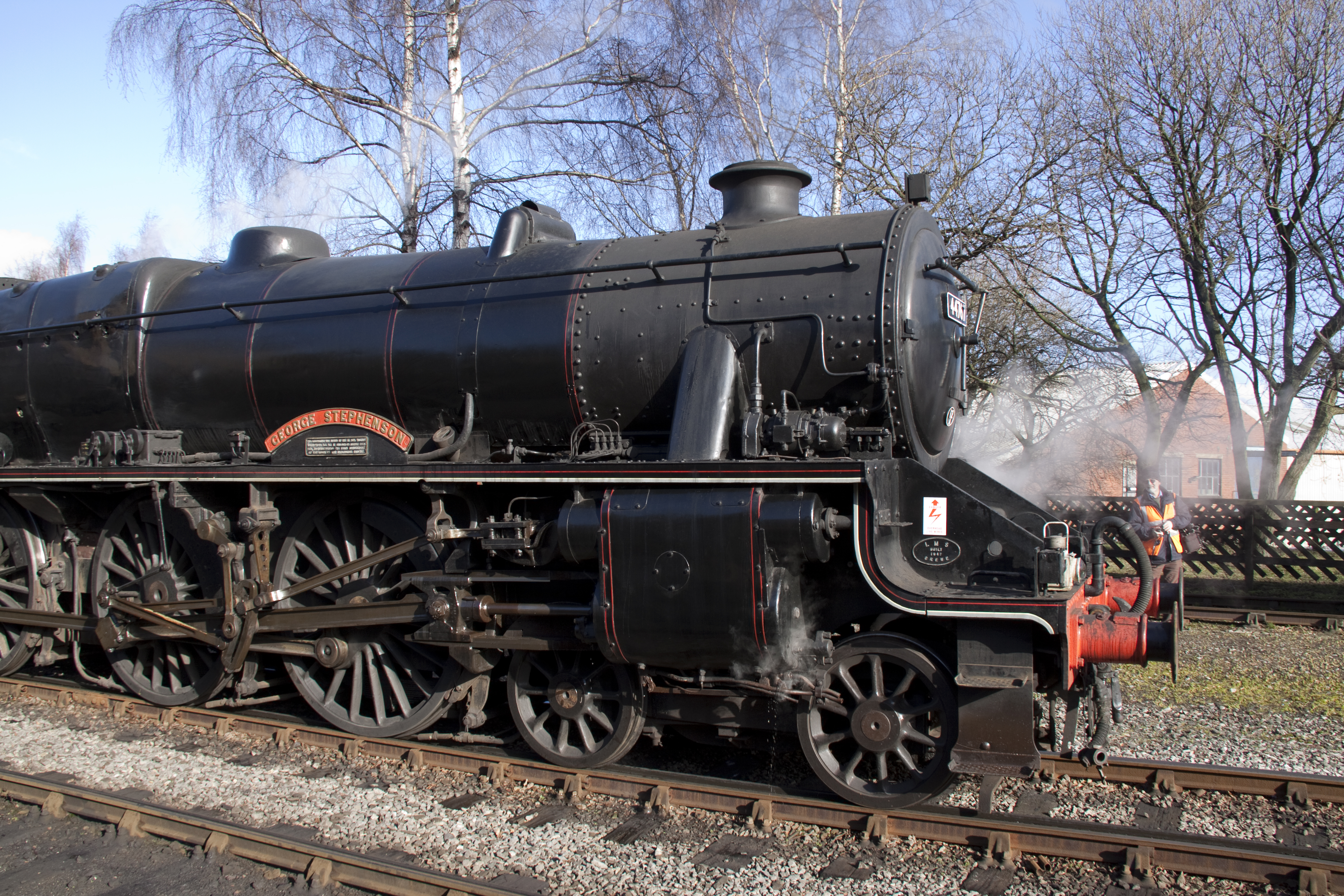
The outside Stephenson link motion of no. 4767

4767 was completed on the last day of the LMS, 31 December 1947 at Crewe Works. It was unique amongst the 842-strong class in that it featured outside Stephenson link motion in addition to other experimental features; a double chimney, Timken roller bearings throughout and electric lighting.

These modifications were part of a series of experiments by George Ivatt to improve the already excellent William Stanier-designed Black Five.

4767 was renumbered 44767 by British Railways after nationalisation in 1948. Its double chimney was removed in 1953. It was withdrawn in December 1967 after a working life of only 20 years.

== Allocations ==
44767 was only transferred between sheds five times during its career with British Railways with its first allocation being to Crewe North and its final allocation being at Carlisle Kingmoor. The list below shows the shed locations of 44767 on particular dates.

Shed allocations
Location	Shed code	From
Crewe North	5A	1 January 1948
Polmadie	66A	11 February 1950
Bank Hall	27A	30 November 1950
Southport	27C	17 March 1962
Carlisle Kingmoor	12A	14 November 1964

== Preservation ==
44767 was purchased directly from British Railways for preservation by Ian Storey and was stored at Carnforth until 1974 when it was taken to Thornaby for restoration to running order by the North Eastern Locomotive Preservation Group. Restoration work was complete for the 150th anniversary of the Stockton and Darlington Railway in 1975. At Shildon, the former Secretary of State for Northern Ireland, William Whitelaw named 44767 after famous railway engineer George Stephenson. A plaque below its nameplates reads:

This locomotive was named by the Right Hon. William Whitelaw C.H. M.C. M.R. at Shildon on August 25th 1975 to commemorate the 150th anniversary of the Stockton and Darlington Railway.

In 1988, it was featured in 'The Thistle' music video by Jesse Rae. Filming locations on the West Highland Line with Glenfinnan Viaduct.

The locomotive saw regular use along the mainline, including services in Scotland. The locomotive was based on the North Yorkshire Moors Railway before being taken out of service at the end of 2002 for a full overhaul.

In December 2009, 44767 returned to steam at Morpeth in Northumberland, where it was overhauled, from where it was moved to the Great Central Railway for running in and painting.

Between May and September 2010, 44767 was in use at the North Norfolk Railway, before visiting the West Somerset Railway for their Autumn Gala. It then spent the winter of 2010 at the Churnet Valley Railway, before visiting the Keighley and Worth Valley Railway for their winter steam gala in February 2011. It then returned to the North Yorkshire Moors Railway for the 2011 season, before returning to the Churnet Valley Railway for the 2011 winter season, although its stay there was curtailed due to firebox troubles. Following a two-year repair effort, the engine re-entered service at the North Norfolk Railway in February 2014, where it ran for the rest of the year, before moving to Swanwick at the Midland Railway – Butterley to undergo work. In September 2018, 44767 was sold to the West Coast Railway Company.

During an interview by Trackside with David Smith in May 2026 regarding if 45110 would operate on the main line again following its Toddington debut, 44767 was mentioned by David Smith who stated: "We've got George Stephenson coming up which will be a better engine for the main line, so there's no point in doing three 'Black Fives'". Although undergoing a significant rebuild since 2014, it has the edge over its 60 mph sisters, being registered for 75 mph running.
