= Otto Jabelmann =

American locomotive designer (1891–1943)

- Born: 24 July 1891; Cheyenne, Wyoming, United States
- Died: 6 January 1943 (aged 51); London, England
- Known for: Designer of the Big Boy locomotives

Otto Jabelmann was an American locomotive designer, best known for being the designer of the Big Boy Locomotives, some of the heaviest locomotives ever built.

== Early life ==
Jabelmann was born in Cheyenne, Wyoming to Louis and Anna Jabelmann. He attended high schools in Cheyenne, Seattle and Ann Arbor. He studied engineering at University of Michigan and Stanford University. He married Teresa M. Jabelmann in 1927.

== Career ==
In July 1 1936 Union Pacific placed Jabelmann in charge of the department with the title of assistant superintendent of motive power and machinery. He was headquartered in Omaha. His first job was to create a steam-turbine locomotive with electrical transmission, the first of its kind in the states. He called for a complete rebuild of the steam program claiming smaller and older engines could not keep up with soaring demand for tonnage and speed, let alone the sheer volume of trains needed. In 1940 William Jeffers, the president of the Union Pacific order Jabelmann to design a locomotive capable of pulling unassisted trains over Sherman Hill and the Wasatch Range. He concluded that the locomotive would have to have 135,000 pounds of tractive effort and an adhesion factor of four and to meet the demands. Within three months, Union Pacific’s Department of Research and Mechanical Standards designed the giant locomotive and the American Locomotive Company (ALCo) of Schenectady, New York agreed to build the new Class. In an amazing feat of engineering and manufacturing, it only took about a year to complete the entire project, six months to design and fabricate the engine parts and another six months to deliver the first locomotive.

== Death ==
In June 1941, Jabelmann suffered a heart attack. Despite doctor’s advice, he continued with his work. During World War II, W. Averell Harriman, UP chairman of the board, took on a government role. He was sent to London by then U.S. president Franklin D. Roosevelt to speed up the Lend-Lease act. While in England he saw the effect the war was having on the railways and asked Jabelmann to come over to help the situation. Despite every doctor recommeding Jabelmann not to travel he didn't want to let his country down so he secretly went to New York to receive a doctor's approval. He travelled to London in the fall of 1942 and in January 6th, 1943 he suffered another heart attack while at a London railway station, this time fatal.

== In popular culture ==
One of Jabelmanns locomotives, Union Pacific 844 was used in the intro of Shining Time Station and featured frequently in the series as Rainbow Sun.

Other works of Jabelmann include the Union Pacific Challenger and the Union Pacific FEF series
