= Arturo Caprotti =

Italian engineer and architect (1881–1938)

- Born: 22 March 1881
- Died: 9 February 1938 (aged 56)
- Occupations: Engineer, architect

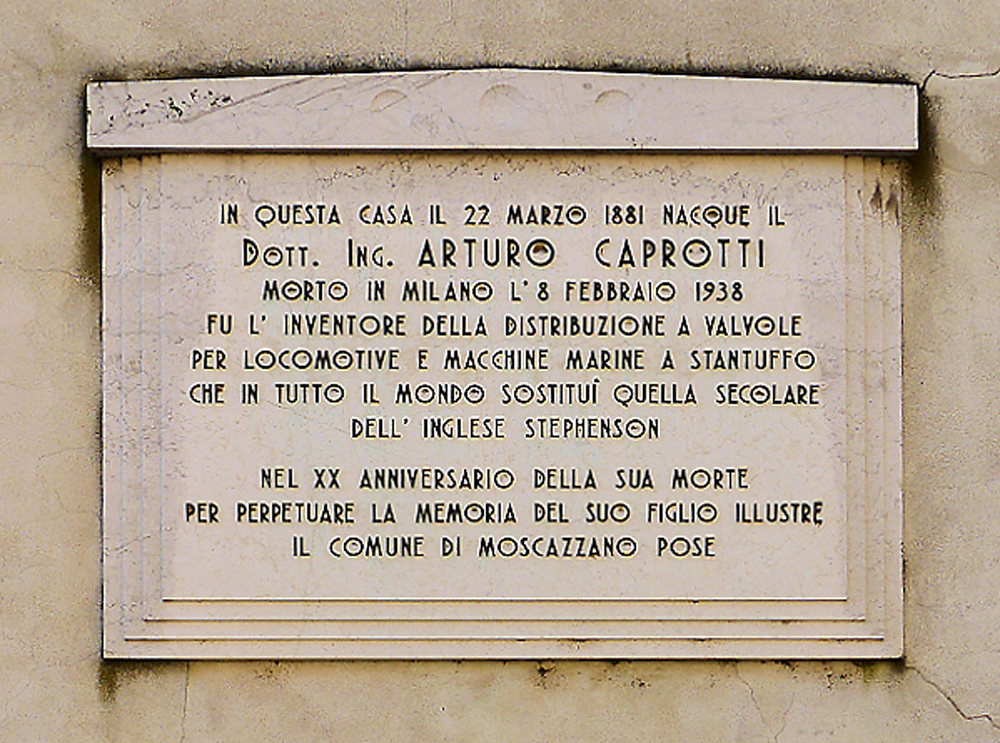
Plaque on the birthplace of Arturo Caprotti

Arturo Caprotti (22 March 1881 – 9 February 1938) was an Italian engineer and architect. In 1915 or 1916 he invented the Caprotti valve gear rotary cam poppet valve gear for steam engines of all kinds, but in practice it was employed almost exclusively in railway locomotives.
