= Caprotti valve gear =

Type of steam engine valve gear

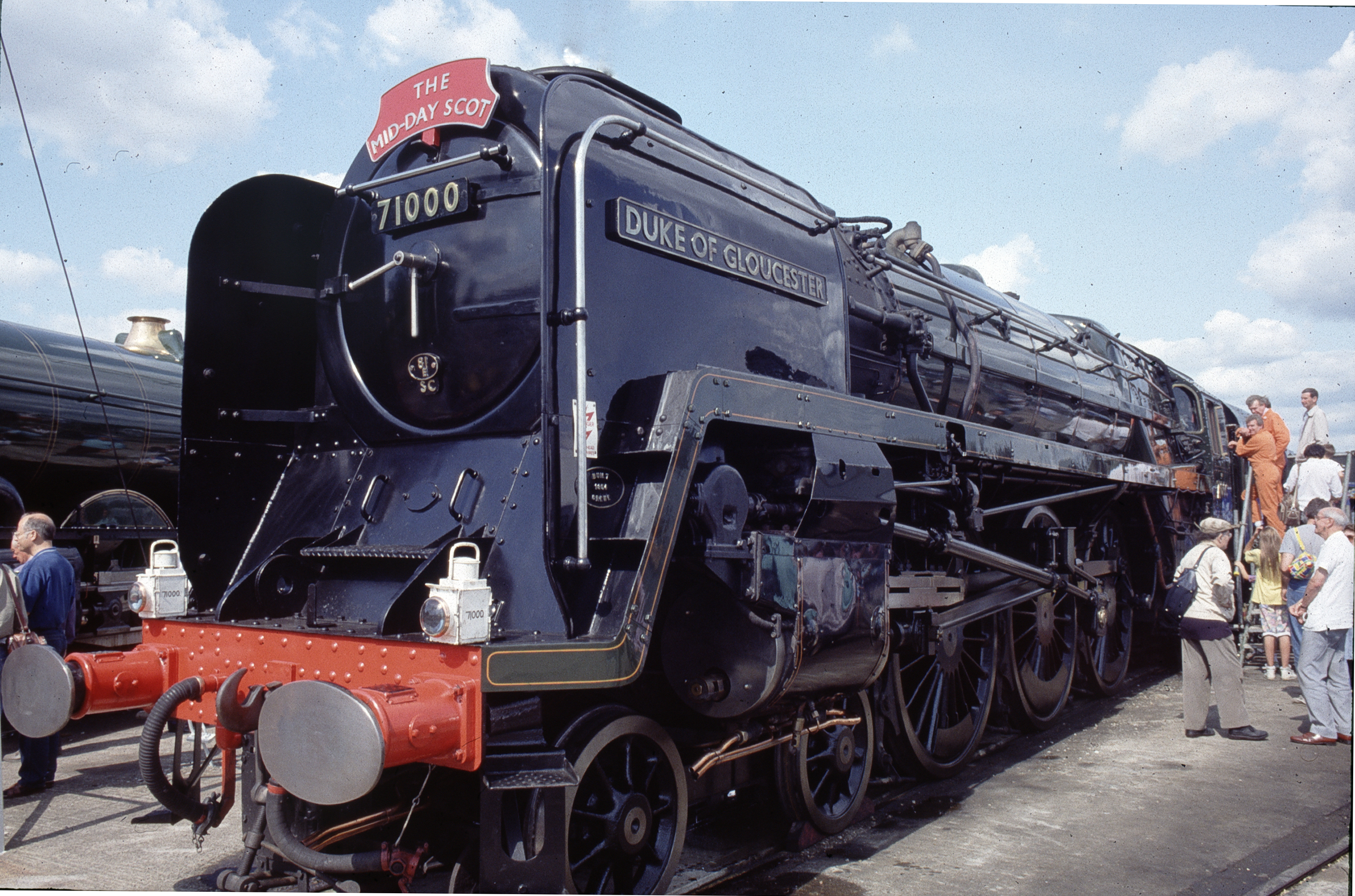
Duke of Gloucester

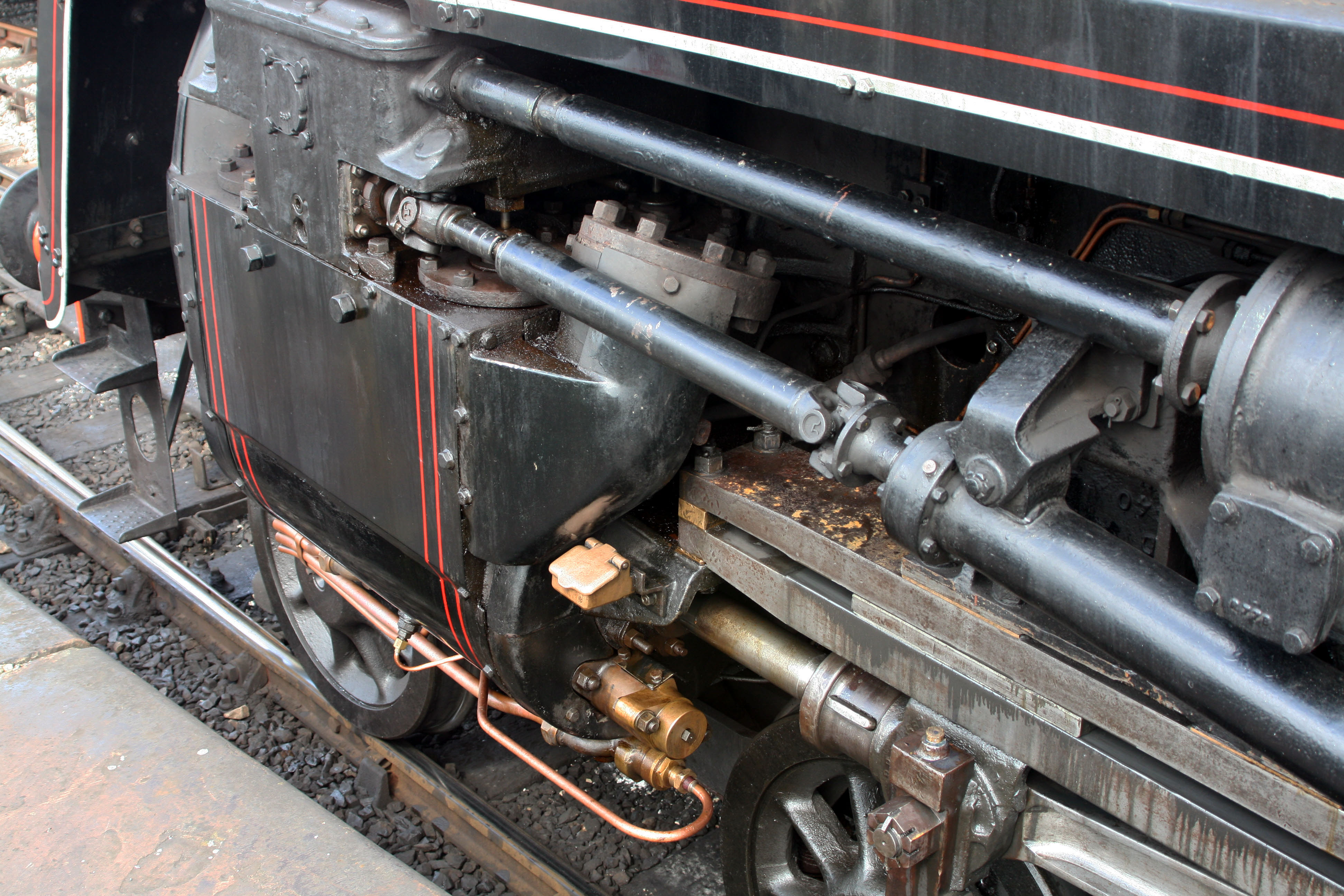
Caprotti valve gear on BR no. 73129

The Caprotti valve gear is a type of steam engine valve gear invented in the early 1920s by Italian architect and engineer Arturo Caprotti. It uses camshafts and poppet valves rather than the piston valves used in other valve gear. While basing his design on automotive valves, Caprotti made several significant departures from this design to adapt the valves for steam. Having agreed a joint-venture with Worcester-based engineering company Heenan & Froude from 1938, Heenan & Froude fully acquired Caprotti post-World War II in 1947.

== Usage in Italy ==
The Caprotti valve gear was first tested on a Ferrovie dello Stato Italiane Class 740 2-8-0 mixed-traffic locomotive in 1921; although more expensive and complicated than the standard piston valves, it substantially improved the locomotive's performance. Until the 1930s it was fitted on some 334 FS locomotives and on 77 narrow-gauge locomotives of other companies; of the former, some were new-builds, the others were rebuilds of non-superheated compound locomotives.

Given their need for more complex and expensive maintenance, most of these locomotives were generally withdrawn from service before those with Walschaerts valve gear, in the 1960s.

== Usage in Great Britain ==
In August 1926, the London, Midland and Scottish Railway equipped four-cylinder 4-6-0 locomotive no. 5908 of the Claughton Class with Caprotti valve gear and poppet valves. Following trials, nine more were rebuilt in 1928 with Caprotti valve gear, poppet valves and larger boilers, and also in 1928 ten others of the same class were given the larger boiler but retained the Walschaerts valve gear and piston valves with which this class was originally fitted, to enable comparisons to be made between the two types of valve gear. Later that year, no. 5908 was also given a larger boiler. It was found that the Caprotti-fitted locomotives were more economical on coal and water than those with Walschaerts valve gear, but it was later found that some of the losses of the Walschaerts locomotives was due to leakage of steam past the valve heads, where a single wide ring was used. New piston valves having several narrow rings were fitted to one locomotive, and it was then found that the Walschaerts valve gear could be just as economical as the Caprotti, but with considerably less cost of fitment. No more Claughtons were fitted with Caprotti valve gear, and the ten locomotives were withdrawn in 1935–36.

On the London and North Eastern Railway (LNER), two 4-6-0 locomotives of LNER Class B3 were rebuilt with Caprotti valve gear in 1929, followed by a further two in 1938–39. These locomotives also had four cylinders, and the poppet valves were mounted vertically, two at each end of each cylinder. One of the first pair of locomotives was rebuilt with Walschaerts valve gear in 1943, but the other three ran with Caprotti valve gear until withdrawal in 1946–47.

== British Caprotti ==
In the 1950s, Caprotti valve gear was improved and this British Caprotti valve gear was fitted to the last two British Railways-built 'Black Fives' 44686/7, the last 30 BR Standard Class 5s, numbers 73125-54, and the unique BR Standard Class 8 71000 Duke of Gloucester. Results were mixed, with the performance of the Duke of Gloucester being particularly disappointing. That was later found to be due to errors elsewhere in the design and construction of the locomotive.

Although more expensive to manufacture than its rivals, the improved Caprotti valve gear is considerably more efficient than any other. A major improvement is that much of the mechanism is enclosed, leading to reduced wear and tear from the harsh steam locomotive environment, and completely independent control of admission and exhaust. The restored Duke of Gloucester, with its flaws eliminated, has proved the concept.
