= Compass Tours =

UK railtour organiser

Compass Tours by Rail
- Compass Tours' 2007 logo
- Company type: Charter train operator
- Industry: Railway
- Founded: 2003
- Founder: Kevin Melia
- Defunct: 2014
- Fate: ceased trading
- Headquarters: Frodsham railway station
- Area served: United Kingdom
- Services: Operation of charter trains

Compass Tours was a UK railtour organiser specialising in excursions with heritage diesel locomotives such as the Class 37, Class 40 and Class 47 and also using Steam Engines such as the LMS Black 5.

A pro-rail company, Compass Tours heavily promoted the advantages of rail as a mode of transport, encouraging passengers to leave their cars and take the train. Nearly 300 tours were organised by the company, with many thousands of passenger journeys being taken. The tours were typically very popular, carrying 400–600 passengers in up to 13 vehicles of Mark 1 or Mark 2F coaching stock.

Compass Tours became one of Britain's main rail excursion organisers operating in the North West, West Midlands, North Wales, and Scottish Borders as well as latterly the North East and East Midlands regions, building a loyal customer base.

Operating with a regular team of volunteer stewards to operate the Secondary Door Locking system and staff the buffet, Compass Tours had a reputation for friendly operations with focused customer service, efforts recognised with a TripAdvisor Certificate of Excellence in 2014.

The company had a regularly updated website, with PayPal booking system to allow passengers to book their tours online, and a comprehensive guide to each of the tours, information also provided to passengers in an on-board souvenir booklet.

== History ==
The brand was originally conceived in 2003 by Kevin Melia when he joined with two friends, Shaun and Nick to operate 30 August 2003 "The Tayside Liner" railtour from Crewe and stations in Cheshire and Lancashire to Stirling and Perth.

As the company grew, Kevin's older brother John Melia joined the company in 2006 as General Manager. On 19 December 2014 the final independent Compass Tours charter train ran. It was their 264th trip, although 276 in total had been intended to run - the other 12 having made it through the advertising stages. Only two were ever cancelled because of a shortage of bookings, quite a remarkable achievement. Nine that didn't run were down to planning issues and the remaining one was cancelled on the morning of the tour itself because of multiple issues with the coaching stock which was being provided by Cotswold Rail.

A new company targeting the same customer database and with a similar name involving West Coast Railways and a business partner, commenced operations in 2015. A new website was introduced branding forthcoming excursions as Compass by West Coast Railways. The original business ceased to exist, with the founder, Kevin Melia, assisting with the transition of the business into its new ownership before stepping down shortly afterwards.

On 3 April 2015 it emerged that forthcoming Compass by West Coast excursions were in doubt due to safety concerns by Network Rail regarding the Safety Management System of West Coast Railways and subsequently, their operating licence was withdrawn.

After a return to operation in May 2015, West Coast Railways reduced the prominence of the Compass brand further, with around half of the original year's programme being cancelled during June. With the reputation of the Compass brand reduced, the new owners dropped the Compass brand entirely, rebranding the tours as West Coast Railways operations.

== Operations ==
=== Steam operations ===
In 2011, Compass Tours ran its first steam operations with five Mersey Moorlander trips running every Monday during August. This service operated from Crewe via Liverpool to Preston, where the steam engine was attached to run to Carlisle via the Settle & Carlisle line and returning directly to Preston via the West Coast Main Line. Locomotives used for the trips included LMS Black 5 45305, BR Britannia Pacific 70013 Oliver Cromwell and LMS Black 5 45231 The Sherwood Forester. Most of the initial excursions were a notable success, although a cylinder failure on 45321, the locomotive on the final tour, caused a failure at Hellifield on the outward leg.

Following on from the success of the initial tours, in 2012 Compass Tours ran a second set of three steam tours, this time to York, under the name of The Roses Express for three Wednesdays during April. The tours operated from Southport on 4 April, Barrow-in-Furness on 11 April and finally Hooton on 18 April, of the 3 only the Southport to York trip was steam hauled throughout with the other two having diesel haulage from the start to certain locations where the steam engines were attached. Locomotives used for these trips were LMS Stanier 8F 48151 and LMS Royal Scot 46115 Scots Guardsman. 48151 worked 4 and 18 April tours with 46115 only working 11 April's service from Barrow-in-Furness.

The Mersey Moorlander services had a resurgence in 2012, with two dates in July and the remainder being on Mondays during August. Unlike the 2011 services, hauled by a multitude of locomotives, all of the 2012 excursions were hauled by LMS Black 5 45305.

In 2013 a number of steam excursions were planned to run. However, the first services were plagued by problems; LMS 8F 48151 failed at Carlisle with the White Rose Moorlander, due to a broken spring. The Yorkshire Coast Express also suffered problems when the same locomotive caused numerous fires on the return trip which resulted in its removal at York. Out of the three further tours that were planned only one went ahead, with LMS Black 5 44932 hauling The Fylde Coast Express from Carlisle to Blackpool North.

No steam trips were planned for 2014, however rather quietly it was decided that one portion of the multiday West Highlander was to be steam hauled between Crianlarich and Oban with the locomotive being confirmed as LMS Black 5 45407 The Lancashire Fusilier, unusually with 44871 on the rear providing a hitherto unseen sight of top and tail steam locomotives hauling air-conditioned Mark 2F stock. This was because of a shortage of lightweight diesel locomotives being available for the trip in to Oban, where Route Availability requirements are stringent. They were provided at no extra cost to Compass Tours.

In 2015, under new ownership, planned steam haulage returned; locomotives used include LMS Jubilee Class 4-6-0s numbers 45690 Leander and 45699 Galatea.

=== Rolling stock used ===
In its 12-year history, Compass Tours never owned any rolling stock but hired in coaches and locomotives from a train operating company or locomotive preservation group as required.

In later years it used West Coast Railways, based at Carnforth MPD to provide both locomotives and rolling stock, but also used DB Schenker, Cotswold Rail, FM Rail, Direct Rail Services, Freightliner, Riviera Trains, Class 40 Preservation Group and AC Locomotive Group. The Compass Tours archive shows a full list of previously used locomotives.

== Social responsibility and charity operations ==
Until cessation of operations at the end of 2014, Compass Tours supported AYME - the Association of Young People with ME through an organised charity raffle and a collection box on-board most of its commercially operated charter services. Over £100,000 was raised for the charity over the 12 years. Additional on board raffles were occasionally used to raise funds for the owning/operating group of the locomotive on the tour (such as Class 40 Preservation Society when tours are hauled by 40145 "East Lancashire Railway").
