= Scarborough Spa Express =

Overview
- Service type: Passenger train
- First service: 1981
- Current operator: West Coast Railways

Route
- Termini: Carnforth; Scarborough
- Service frequency: Selected summer Thursdays

Technical
- Rolling stock: Mark I carriages

The Scarborough Spa Express (SSE) is a regular summer heritage steam locomotive service between York and Scarborough. It is currently operated by the West Coast Railways, but has been operated in previous years by different companies, including the Railway Touring Company.

== History ==
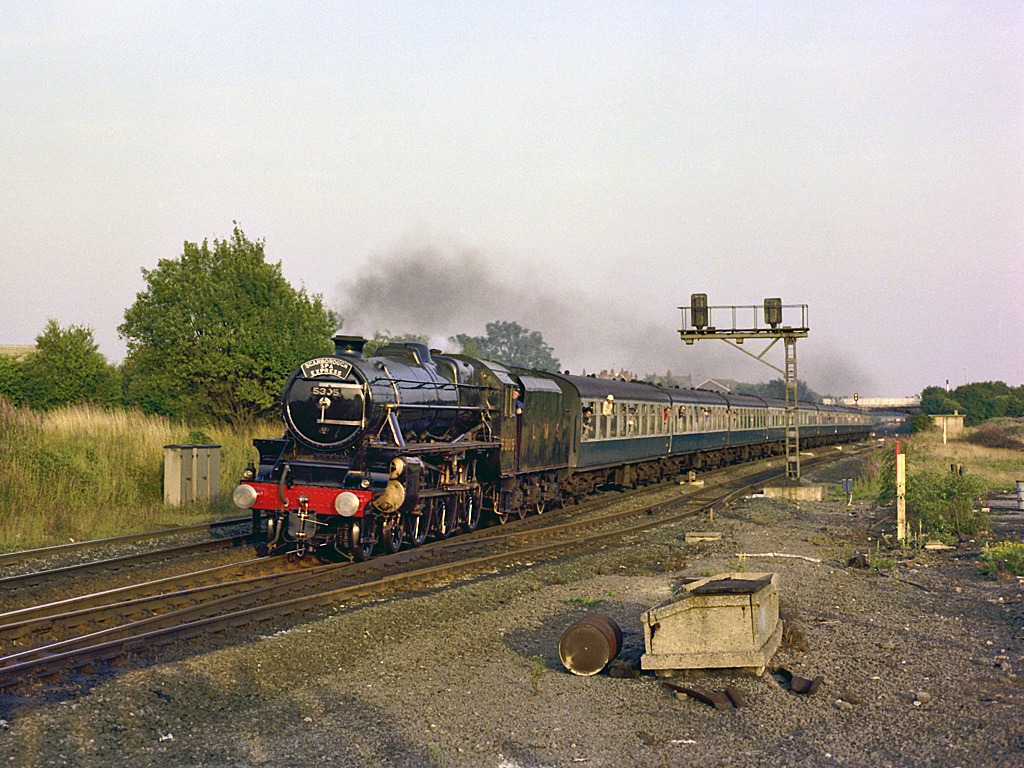
5305 approaching Garforth station, 1980s

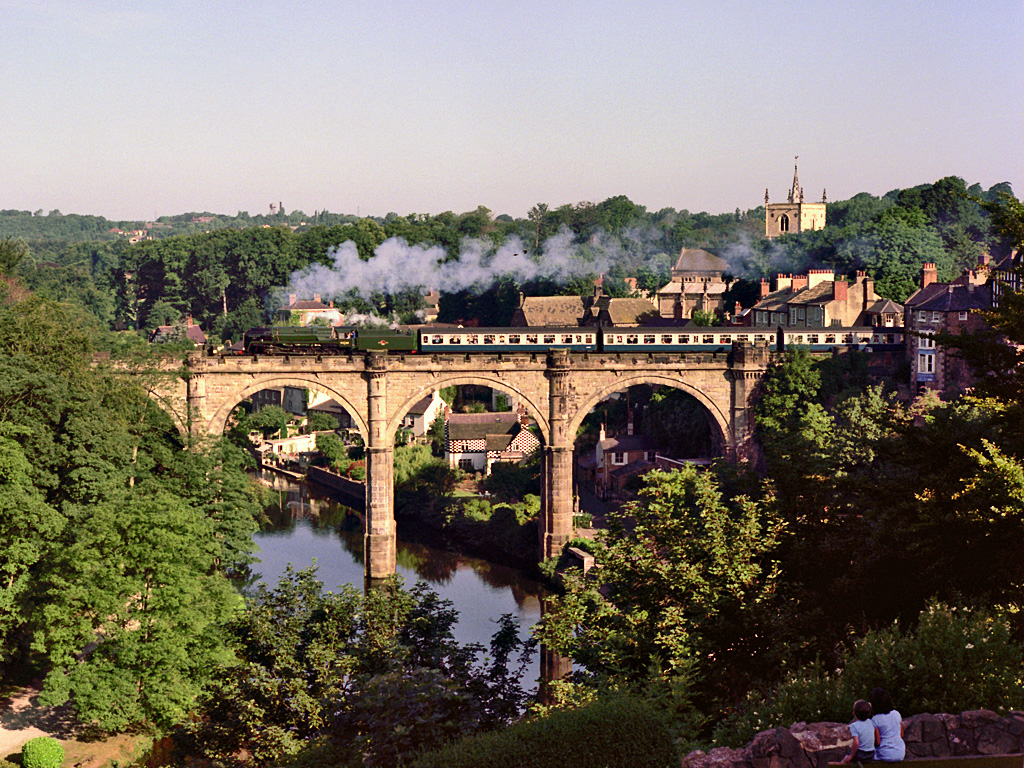
92220 Evening Star on Knaresborough Viaduct, 1980s

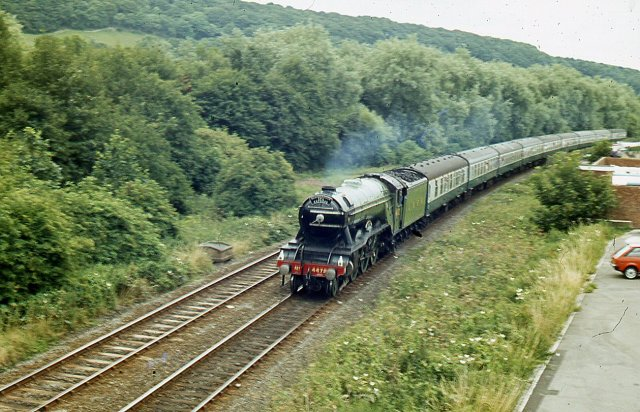
4472 Flying Scotsman approaching Scarborough

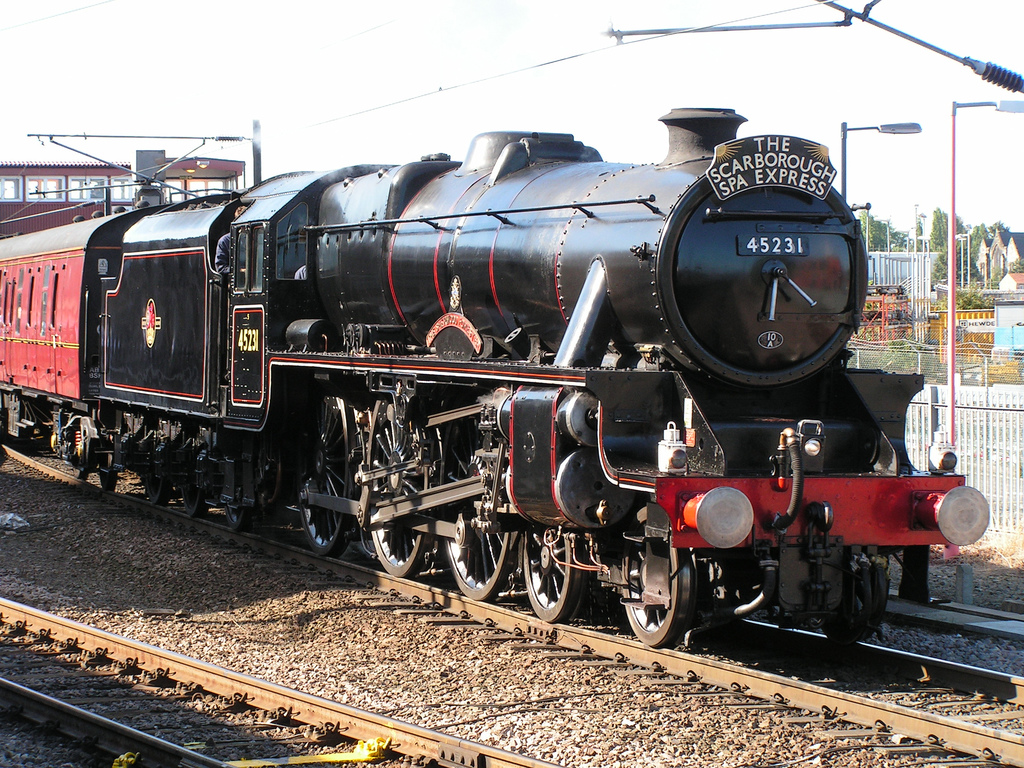
45231 The Sherwood Forester at York in August 2007

Regular steam operations on most of British Rail (BR) ended in 1968. In the early 1970s, BR allowed steam back on the main line, using preserved steam locomotives, and in 1978 it ran a series of trains during the summer months on a circular route from York via Leeds and Harrogate. In 1981, the route was extended to Scarborough after a turntable was reinstated and named the Scarborough Spa Express. These ran until 1988, but ceased when the staff at York who were responsible were reassigned to separate divisions at InterCity and Regional Railways.

== In the 2000s ==
After 1988, there were occasional steam railtours to Scarborough, featuring locomotives which included 60800 Green Arrow, 46229 Duchess of Hamilton, 48151 Gauge O' Guild, 3440 City of Truro and 45596 Bahamas. It was not until 2002 that regular trips began again. These were introduced by West Coast Railways and ran from Scarborough to York and return for three days a week during July and August. The same format was used again in 2003.

The National Railway Museum (NRM) began running a service directly from York to Scarborough in 2004. 4472 Flying Scotsman, having just been acquired by the NRM, was the main locomotive used, but 45407 The Lancashire Fusilier was available in the event of any failure. 5972 Olton Hall also stood in on at least one occasion, still wearing its Hogwarts Express livery. The NRM sponsored the SSE until the end of 2006, when they decided to hand over the running of the SSE to the Railway Touring Company. In 2007, the Railway Touring Company included the Harrogate loop in the SSE itinerary once more and ran a number of very successful tours during July and August. In 2008–2009, WCR took over the running of the SSE and they again utilised the Harrogate loop, running on three days a week during July and August.

In 2010, the route was changed when gauging problems on the Harrogate loop put a stop to any steam locomotive using that route. This is how the Wakefield Circle was born, with WCR again running the SSE three days a week during July and August. The route was York-Normanton-Wakefield Kirkgate-Wakefield Westgate-Woodlesford-Castleford and back to York; then, from York the usual trip to Scarborough and back to York and the Wakefield Circle as per the morning run, and finally returning to York at 21–00. It was intended that the same route would be used in 2012.

As at 2019, it operates on selected Thursdays during the summer, being hauled by a WCR diesel from Carnforth to York where a steam locomotive takes over for the journey to Scarborough.

== Locomotives ==
The following locomotives have been used:

- 4472 Flying Scotsman
- 60009 Union of South Africa
- 6233 Duchess of Sutherland
- 45231 The Sherwood Forester
- 45407 The Lancashire Fusilier
- 34067 Tangmere
- 45690 Leander
- 48151 Gauge O Guild
- 70013 Oliver Cromwell
- 45699 Galatea
- 35018 British India Line
- 46115 Scot Guardsman

On 31 July 2007, 6233 Duchess of Sutherland made its first run of the summer but hit a bridge on the approach to Harrogate, this caused minor damage to the drivers side of the firebox. Because of this incident 6233 was not allowed on the Harrogate line for the remainder of the year.

== See also ==
- Northern Belle
