= LMS Stanier Class 8F 8151 =

British 2-8-0 locomotive

LMS 8151
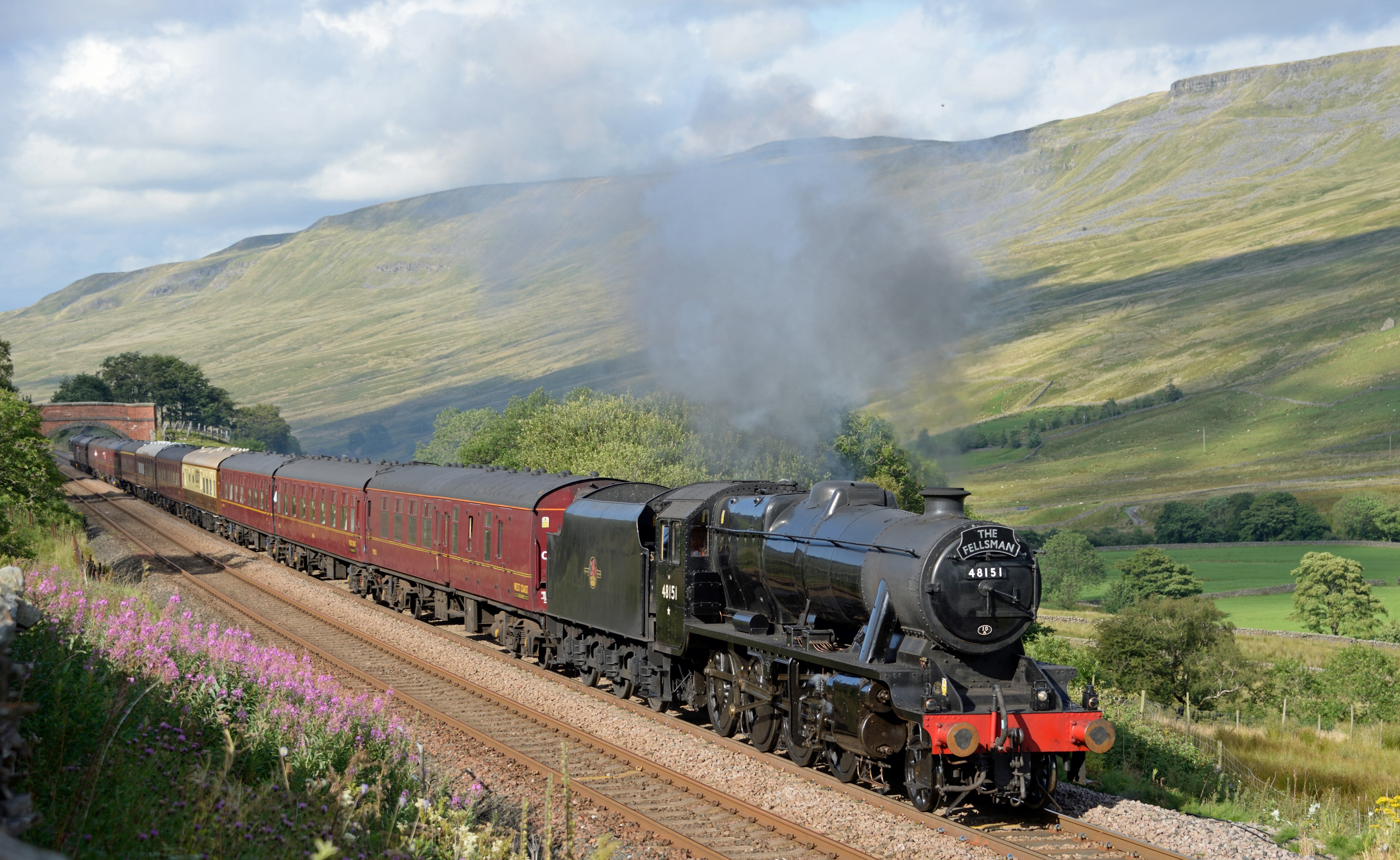
- 48151 approaching Aisgill
Type and origin
- Power type: Steam
- Designer: William Stanier
- Builder: Crewe Works
- Serial number: 154 (second series)
- Build date: September 1942
Specifications
- Configuration
  - Whyte: 2-8-0
  - UIC: 1′D h2
- Gauge: 4 ft 8 1/2 in (1,435 mm)
- Leading dia.: 3 ft 3 1/2 in (1.003 m)
- Driver dia.: 4 ft 8 1/2 in (1.435 m)
- Length: 63 ft 0 1/2 in (19.22 m)
- Loco weight: 72.10 long tons (73.26 t; 80.75 short tons)
- Fuel type: Coal
- Fuel capacity: 9 long tons (9.1 t; 10.1 short tons)
- Water cap.: 4,000 imp gal (18,000 L; 4,800 US gal)
- Firebox
  - Grate area: 28 1/2 sq ft (2.65 m^{2})
- Boiler: LMS type 3C
- Boiler pressure: 225 lbf/in^{2} (1.55 MPa)
- Cylinders: Two, outside
- Cylinder size: 18 1/2 in × 28 in (470 mm × 711 mm)
- Valve gear: Walschaerts
- Valve type: Piston valves
Performance figures
- Tractive effort: 32,440 lbf (144.30 kN)
Career
- Operators: London, Midland and Scottish Railway; → British Railways
- Power class: LMS & BR: 7F, later 8F
- Numbers: LMS: 8151; BR: 48151
- Axle load class: BR: Route Availability 6
- Withdrawn: January 1968
- Restored: 1988
- Current owner: West Coast Railways
- Disposition: Operational, Mainline Certified

LMS Stanier Class 8F 8151 (British Railways No. 48151) is a preserved British 8F class 2-8-0 steam locomotive.

== History ==
8151 was built at Crewe Works in 1942 by the LMS as one of the 8F Class. Following nationalisation in 1948, 40000 was added to the class's original numbers and so in 1949 it was renumbered to 48151.

The engine originally was allocated to Grangemouth TMD and spent over thirteen years at Grangemouth before being transferred to Canklow in July 1955. Other sheds the engine was allocated to included Staveley in January 1963, Edge Hill (8A) in April 1964, and finally Northwich in March 1966. The engine remained at Northwich for its remaining working career for British Railways until January 1968, when it was withdrawn from service. No. 48151 was one of the last 359 steam engines operating on British mainline railways, those still in service in 1968.

== Preservation ==
No. 48151 was sold to Woodham Brothers scrapyard on Barry Island for in September 1968, and remained there until November 1975 when it was purchased for preservation.

No. 48151 was based at the Embsay and Bolton Abbey Railway for a number of years, but its restoration was not completed there. It was then bought by David Smith and after its heavy restoration was completed in 1988 at Carnforth MPD, it was certified for mainline use and is currently operated by West Coast Railways (WCR) working steam charters across the UK, running on lines never visited before by an 8F.

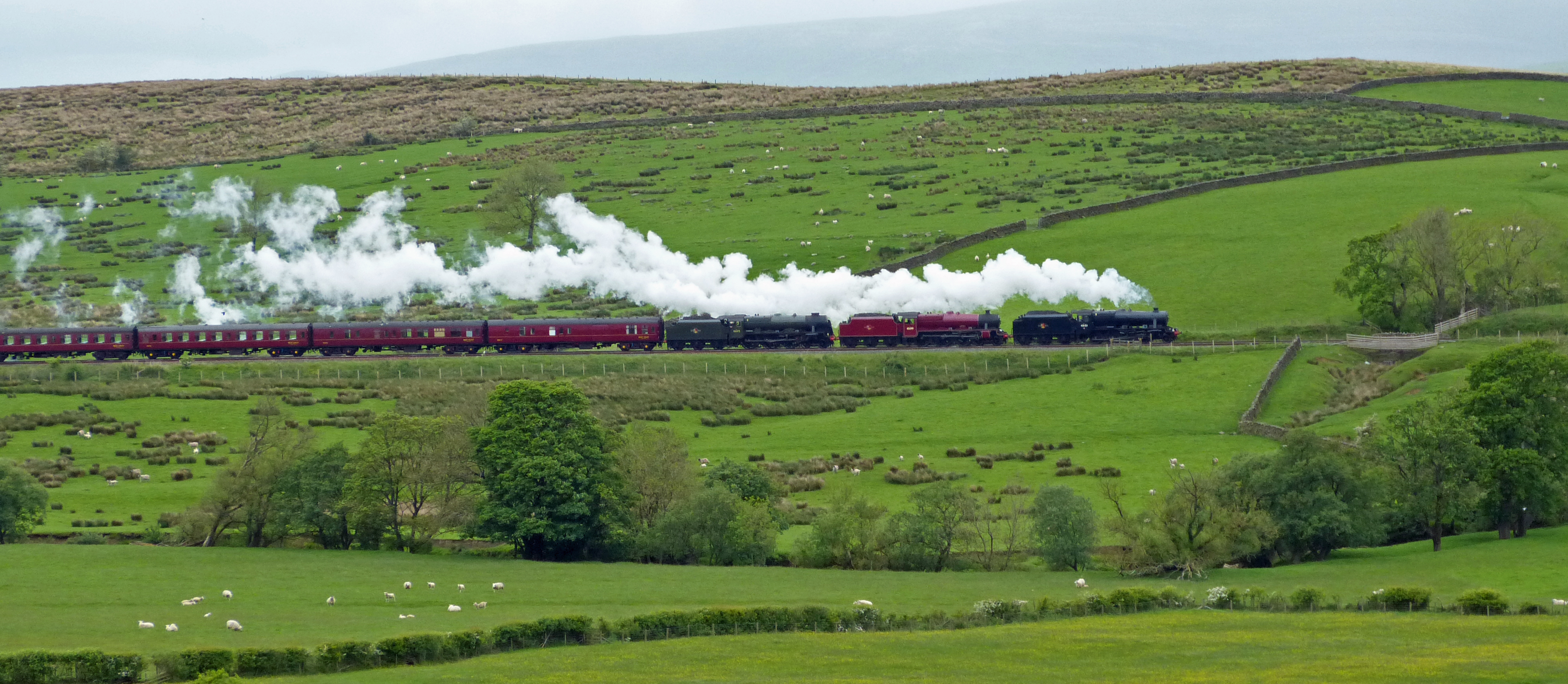
48151 leading 45699 Galatea' working back to Carnforth from the Mid Norfolk Railway in triple headed formation

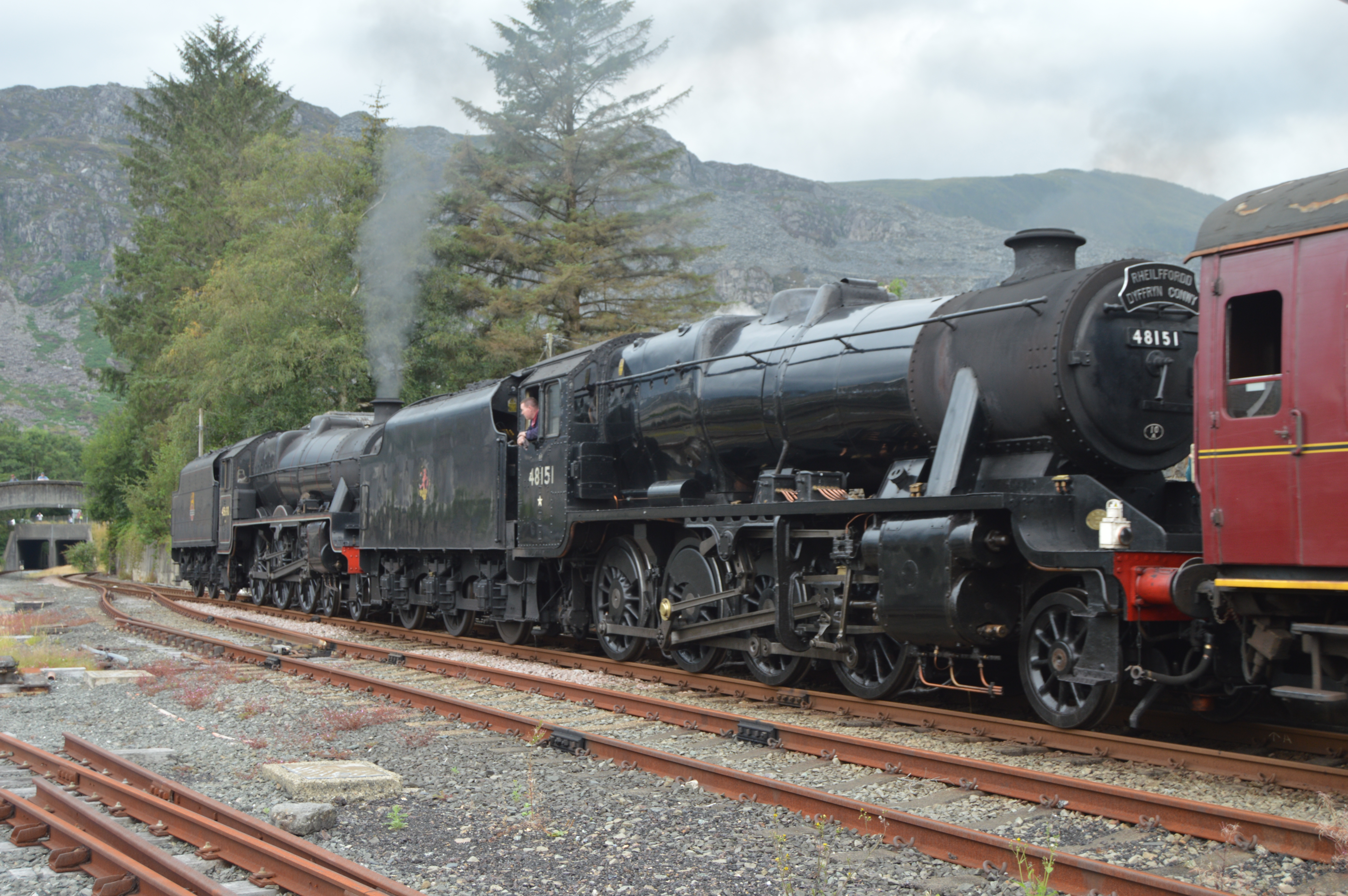
48151 & 45690 Leander shunting their empty coaches in Blaenau Ffestiniog after arriving with "The Conwy Quest" railtour.

In November 1995, it was loaned for a short time to Tunstead Quarry to haul a 975-ton train of hopper wagons.

In 2000, it made its first operational visit to a heritage railway, when it visited the Great Central Railway for a brief period in June of that year, as well as making a brief visit back to Staveley the following month, now the Barrow Hill Engine Shed. In December 2000, it worked a special one-off freight train along the Settle and Carlisle line from Hellifield to Ribblehead Quarry where the hopper wagons were loaded. It then worked the loaded train on from Ribblehead Quarry to Carlisle.

That same year, the engine was considered to portray the Hogwarts Express in the 2001 fantasy film, Harry Potter and the Philosopher's Stone, but GWR 4900 Class 5972 Olton Hall was chosen instead.

In October 2003, No. 48151 worked its first train over Shap Summit since the end of steam in 1968, the charter was operated by WCR and ran from Carnforth to Carlisle via Shap both ways.

In August 2008, No. 48151 worked the Liverpool to Manchester leg of the Fifteen Guinea Special reenactment which was celebrating 40 years since the ending of steam on BR in August 1968, it was covering for 45110 as its mainline certificate had run out. This was also to be the first time since 1966 that 48151 had visited Liverpool since being allocated to Edge Hill.

In August 2010, it became the first member of its class to work over the Conwy Valley Line. The train was the Railway Touring Company's Welsh Mountaineer from Preston to Blaenau Ffestiniog running via Chester and Llandudno Junction, the section from Chester to Llandudno Junction being tender first due to the train reversing direction at the junction alongside the fierce 1 in 47 gradient in the Blaenau direction. The engine has visited the route on a number of occasions in July and August 2011, 2012, 2014 and 2018 with other trips being worked by 45231 The Sherwood Forester, 46115 Scots Guardsman and 61994 The Great Marquess.

In April 2012, it worked the first steam railtour from Southport since 1995, the train in question being Compass Tours "Roses Express" which ran from Southport to York traveling out via Eccles and returning via Bolton. 48151 was also the first member of its class to visit the resort as no 8F's were allocated to Southport Derby Road MPD in steam days.

In May 2014, it made only its second appearance at a heritage railway when it alongside fellow 10A based engines 45699 Galatea and 46115 Scots Guardsman. The three engines travelled from Carnforth to Dereham on Thursday, 29 May in triple headed formation along with a set of coaches as most of the Mid-Norfolk Railway's coaches weren't vacuum braked. The three engines then ran at the MNR's West Coast Railways steam gala from Friday, 30 May to Sunday, 1 June and then on Monday, 2 June, the three engines returned to Carnforth once more travelling as a triple headed formation.

On 14 June 2014, it worked only its second train over Shap Summit for the first time since October 2003, the train this time being the Railway Touring Company's Cumbrian Coast Express that ran from London Euston to Carlisle. The 8F took over the train at Carnforth and worked northbound over Shap's 1 in 75 to Carlisle with the return leg being via Whitehaven and Grange-over-Sands on the Cumbrian Coast and Furness Lines.

In July 2018, its third Shap Summit train was the Railway Touring Company's Cumbrian Mountain Express that ran from London Euston to Carlisle on Saturday, 21 July. The engine's two previous trips up Shap was worked alon, but due to a restricted use of steam engines on Network Rail lines due to the hot weather at the time, 48151 was assisted by a Class 47 diesel No. 47237. The return route of this tour was via the Settle and Carlisle Line.

In March 2019, the Conwy Valley Line was temporarily closed following multiple washouts along the route inflicted by Storm Gareth. The damage from the storm had left sections of the line suspended in the air as the embankments had been washed away and other sections were under water which made the route unsafe for rail traffic. Following repair work to mark the reopening of the line "Transport for Wales Rail" in co-operation with "West Coast Railways" ran a train called "The Conwy Quest" which ran from Chester to Blaenau Ffestiniog via Llandudno Junction on Sat 3 Aug. The load that was to be hauled on the day which was 9 coaches required the special to be double headed (the gradient being 1 in 40 in the Blaenau direction alongside the tight curves would be too much for the 8F to cope with alone). 46115 Scots Guardsman was the original second engine intended to work with 48151 however owing to a hot axlebox days before while on a test run following completion of its overhaul her place was taken by 45690 Leander. In August 2019, No. 48151 hauled the Conwy Quest from Chester to Blaenau Ffestiniog via Llandudno Junction while double heading with 45690 Leander. This trip was run to mark the re-opening of the Conwy Valley Line following a closure period due to damage inflicted from Storm Gareth which resulted in numerous washouts.

48151 was withdrawn from service in August 2019 for an overhaul following the expiry of its boiler certificate. Following its overhaul the locomotive made its first mainline test run on 16 June 2026.
