= Peter Beet =

Peter Leslie Beet MRCS LRCP (17 February 1937 – 28 October 2005) was an English general practitioner notable for his pioneering work in the preservation of steam locomotives.

== Early years and education ==
Raised in Kendal on the edge of the Lake District, close to the London, Midland and Scottish Railway's West Coast Main Line, he was educated in Harrogate, close to the London and North Eastern Railway's East Coast Main Line. He attended medical school in Leeds, where on the weekends he would visit Tebay and its engine shed, with staff letting him clean and prepare locomotives. After graduation he became a general practitioner in Morecambe, Lancashire, in 1964.

== Preservation work ==
Beet first tried to save the Sir William Stanier-designed Coronation 46243 City of Lancaster, but was unsuccessful. He then tried to save the Furness Railway's Lakeside branch line, chairing the Lakeside Railway Estates Company. However, he was able to save an Ivatt Class 2 Mogul No. 46441 from being scrapped. He also managed to save LMS Black 5 No. 44871, which hauled the last steam service on British Railways, with the help of Graham Ellis, LMS Black 5 No. 44932 with the assistance of Sir Bill McAlpine and LMS Black 5 No. 45407 with the help of Sir William McAlpine and David Davis when visiting Lostock Hall in 1968. Although the plan was backed by transport minister Barbara Castle, the need to widen the A590 road and the resultant loss of a railway bridge over the River Leven, meant that the complete vision was unsuccessful, but the company saved 3.5 miles (5.6 km), albeit isolated from the main network, to create the Lakeside and Haverthwaite Railway from 1973. He also purchased LMS Jubilee Class 5690 Leander from Brian Oliver in 1972. He also saved one German tank engine and five Andrew Barclay 0-4-0 saddle tank engines, one of which is still owned by his son.

However, not all of Dr. Beet's attempts at preserving steam locomotives were successful. Aside from the failed attempt to LMS Coronation Class No. 46243 City of Lancaster, which was his most well-known unsuccessful preservation attempt. He tried to purchase Fowler 2-6-4T No. 42414 and Fairburn 2-6-4T No. 42210 which had served as banking engines in Tebay. He also tried to save LMS Ivatt Mogul No. 46400, which was the first member of the class, but that was attempt was ultimately unsuccessful. He also tried to save LNER Peppercorn Class A1 No. 60158 Aberdonian which ended in failure. There are also unconfirmed reports of him trying to rescue LMS Coronation Class No. 46255 City of Hereford, LMS Ivatt Prairie Tank Engine No. 41286 and LMS Rebuilt Patriot Class No. 45526 Morecambe and Heysham.

Still looking to preserve mainline locomotives, Beet was instrumental in saving 23. Realising that there would be a need for maintenance and servicing, in 1968 he successfully acquired a lease on the LMS 10A shed at Carnforth, creating the attraction of Steamtown from 1968, funded by industrialist and fellow steam enthusiast Sir William McAlpine, 6th Baronet. Originally planned to be the maintenance base for the L&HR, it became the base for some of the first private mainline preserved trains, operating from Carnforth to Sellafield and York. The venture closed as a public access visitor attraction in 1997, some years after the preserved site was taken over by businessman David Smith to become the base for his West Coast Railways (WCR).

After the Severn Valley Railway decided to sell their Jubilee 5690 Leander, Beet bought the locomotive and had it restored at the East Lancashire Railway. Still owned by his family, it is now operated by WCR from Carnforth.

== Personal life ==
Beet died on 28 October 2005, aged 68.
