= Riviera Trains =

British railway spot-hire company

Riviera Trains Limited
- Founded: 1995
- Headquarters: Crewe, England
- Subsidiaries: Pathfinder Tours UK Railtours
- Website: www.riviera-trains.co.uk

Riviera Trains Limited was a railway spot-hire company based at Burton-on-Trent and Eastleigh in England. In September 2024, all of its assets were sold to West Coast Railways.

== History ==
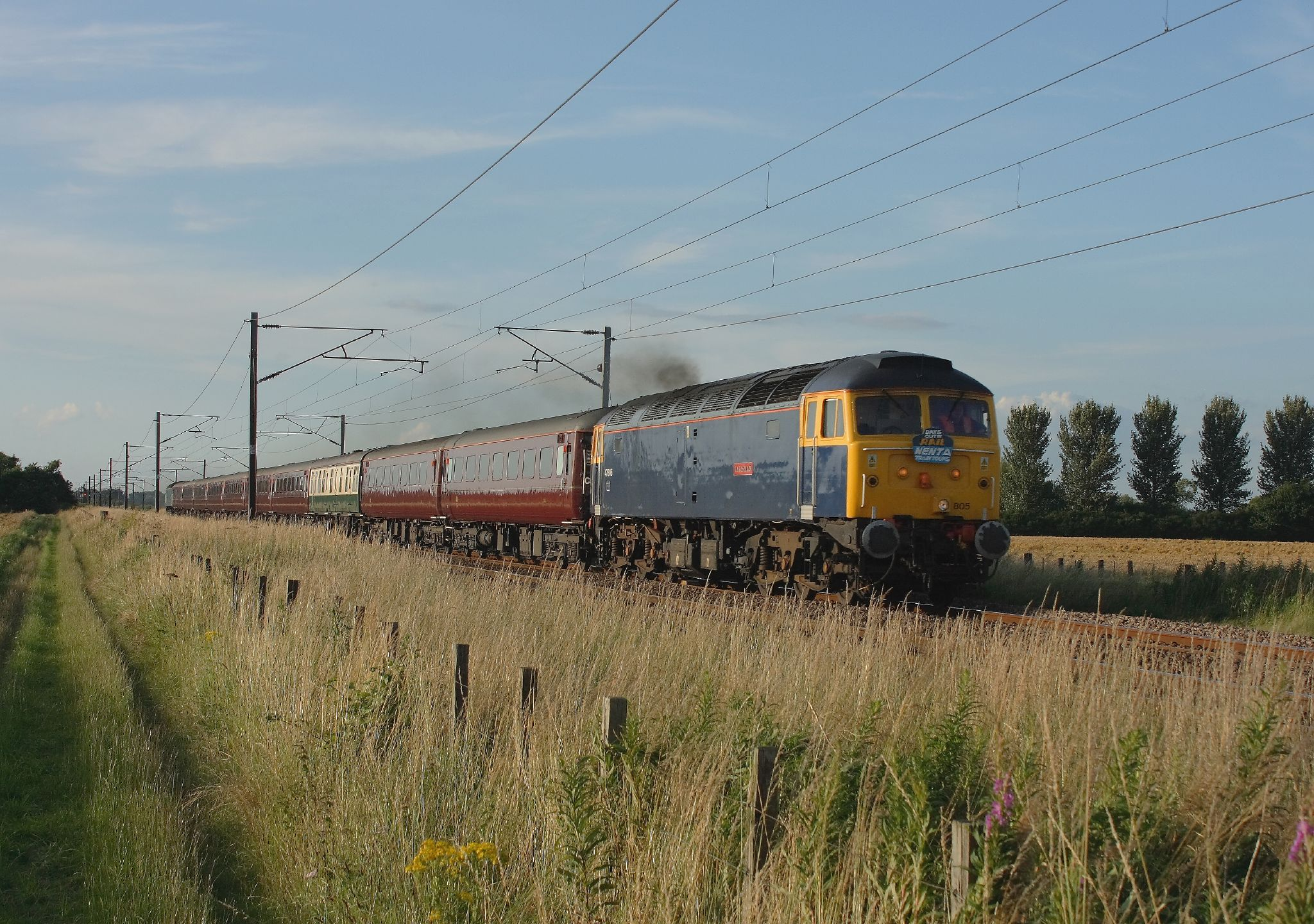
47805 at Cromwell Moor in July 2007

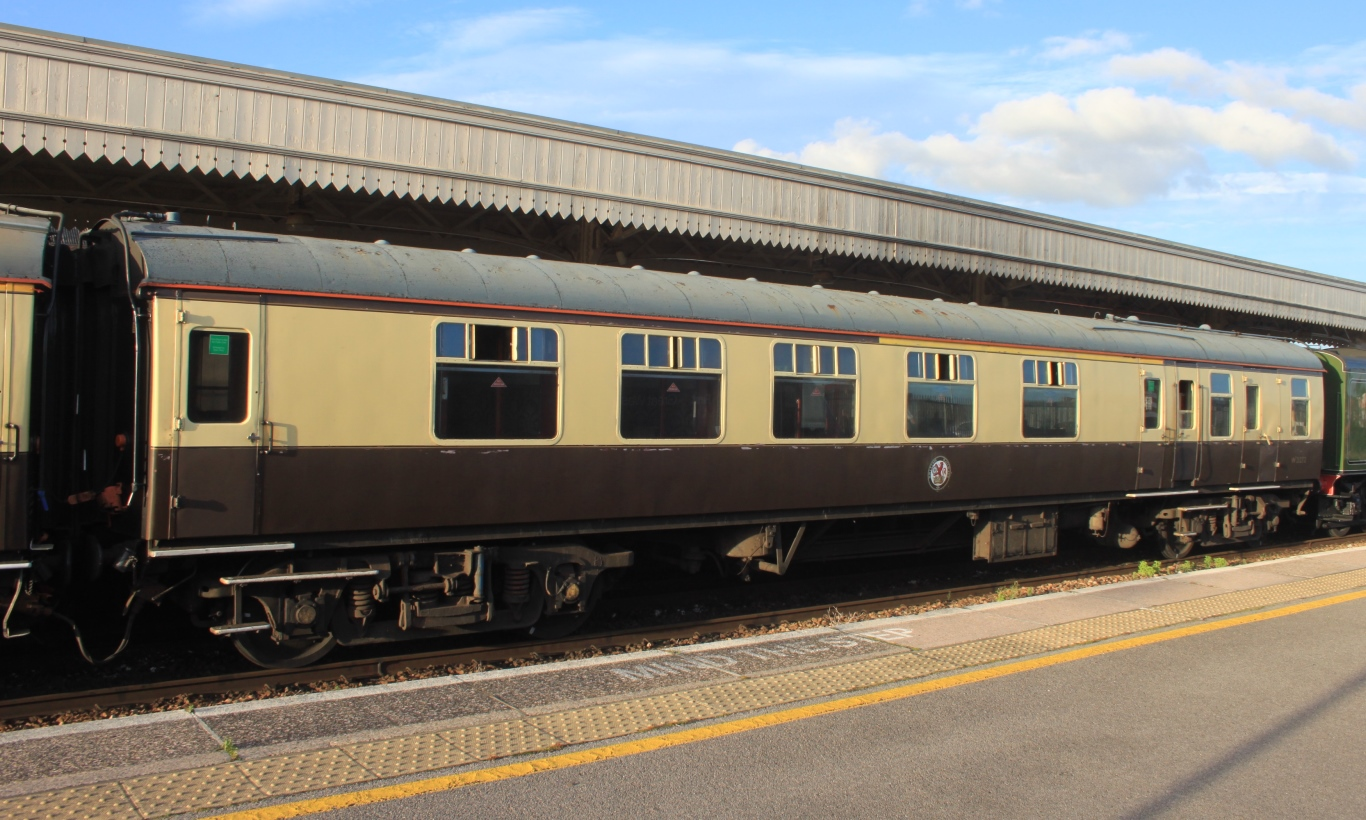
Mark 1 in Great Western Railway livery

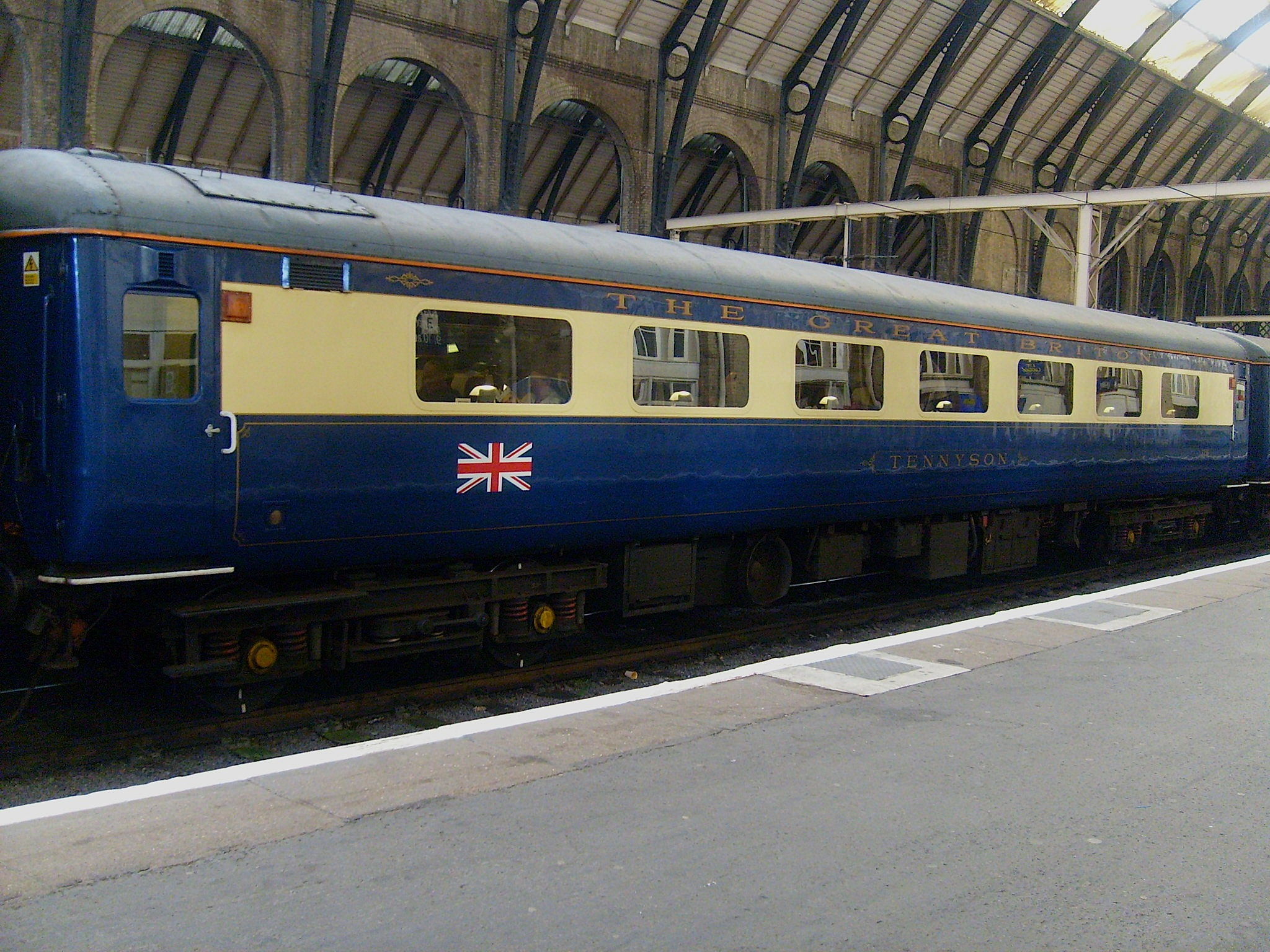
Mark 2 in Great Briton livery

Riviera Trains was founded in 1995, initially based at Cranmore on the East Somerset Railway. It later relocated to Crewe and Eastleigh.

== Operations ==
Riviera Trains has provided rolling stock on both short and long term hire to many train operating companies including Abellio ScotRail, Arriva Trains Wales, Direct Rail Services, First Great Western, First ScotRail, Grand Central, Virgin CrossCountry and Wales & Borders.

Riviera also hire to rail tour customers who include: The Branch Line Society, Compass Tours, Kingfisher Railtours, Past Time Rail, Pathfinder Tours 2006, SRPS, The Railway Touring Company and UK Railtours. In 2006 Riviera Trains acquired Pathfinder Tours.

== Charter Alliance ==
On 1 April 2007 EWS and Riviera Trains launched Charter Alliance to provide charter services.

== Fleet ==
=== Locomotives ===
In 1999 Riviera Trains purchased its first locomotives; 37029 and 47705. Two further Class 47s (47805 and 47839) were acquired from Porterbrook in 2002. Further Class 47s were purchased from Harry Needle Railroad Company (47575 and 47769) and Porterbrook (47812, 47815, 47829, 47843, 47847 and 47848). After long periods with little use, the 47s were sold to Direct Rail Services, Harry Needle Railroad Company and Rail Operations Group between 2011 and 2016.

=== Carriages ===
Riviera Trains commenced with one set of Mark 1 carriages. It later purchased further Mark 1s and Mark 2s.

Riviera Trains launched a rake of Mark 2F coaching stock early in 2006, called The Great Briton. All carriages were in the livery of Oxford Blue and Cream, which were hand painted at LNWR Crewe. The eight coaches are named after famous Britons, such as Shakespeare and Churchill, and feature hand painted Union Jacks on each side of the coaches. In January 2007 The Great Briton luxury Pullman train set took over the operation of the Blue Pullman for Hertfordshire Rail Tours after FM Rail ceased.

On 11 April 2008 Riviera launched a rake of Mark 1 coaching stock named The Royal Scot. This set has had over £500,000 invested in it, with all the coaches painted in carmine and cream livery and featuring The Royal Scot carriage destination boards. Both the interior and exterior of the vehicles underwent a full refurbishment.

== Past fleet ==
Key:	Withdrawn	Sold for further use

Number	Class	Name	Livery	Year acquired	Former operator	Status
47575	47	-	Rail Express Systems	2004	ex EWS	Scrapped in 2010
47705	47	Guy Fawkes	LNWR black	1997	ex Waterman Railways	Sold to Porterbrook in 2002, and converted to 57303
47747	47	-	EWS	2007	ex EWS	Sold to Direct Rail Services in 2011
47769	47	Resolve	Virgin CrossCountry	2004	ex Porterbrook	Sold to Harry Needle Railroad Company in 2013
47805	47	-	Oxford Blue	2005	ex Porterbrook	Sold to Direct Rail Services in 2011
47812	47	-	Oxford Blue	2005	ex Porterbrook	Sold to Rail Operations Group in 2016
47815	47	Great Western	Oxford Blue	2005	ex Porterbrook	Sold to Rail Operations Group in 2016
47829	47	-	British Transport Police	2005	ex Porterbrook	
47839	47	Pegasus	Oxford Blue	2002	ex Porterbrook	Sold to Direct Rail Services in 2011
47843	47	Vulcan	Oxford Blue	2005	ex Porterbrook	Sold to Rail Operations Group in 2016
47847	47	-	BR Blue Large Logo	2005	ex Porterbrook	Sold to Rail Operations Group in 2016
47848	47	Titan Star	Oxford Blue	2005	ex Porterbrook	Sold to Rail Operations Group in 2016
47853	47	Rail Express	XP64 Blue/Red	2002	ex Porterbrook	Sold to Direct Rail Services in 2011
