= LMS Jubilee Class 5699 Galatea =

Preserved British 4-6-0 locomotive

LMS 5699 Galatea
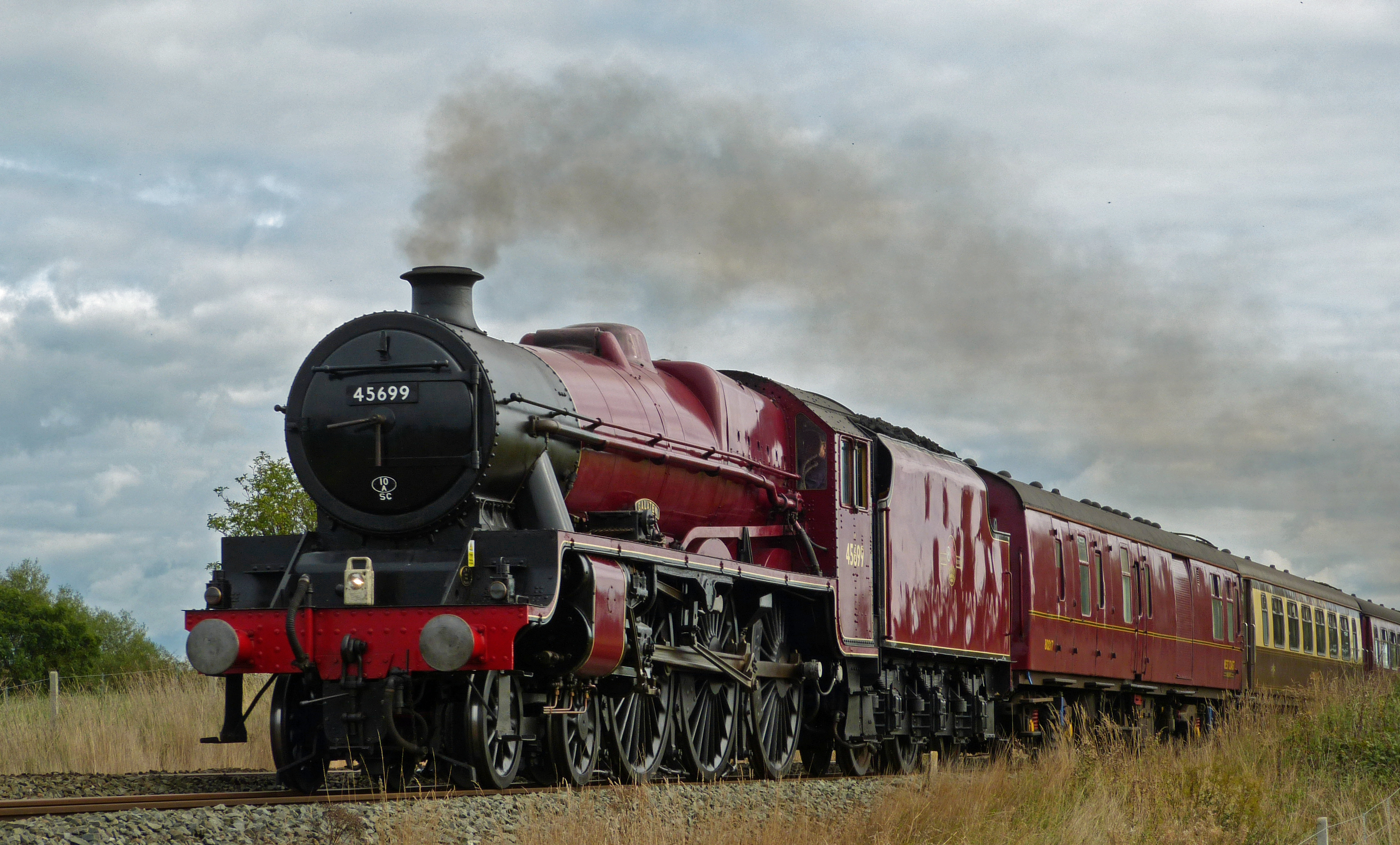
- 45699 Galatea passing Bates Mill in 2013.
Type and origin
- Power type: Steam
- Designer: William Stanier
- Builder: Crewe Works
- Order number: LMS Lot 122
- Build date: April 1936
Specifications
- Configuration
  - Whyte: 4-6-0
  - UIC: 2′C h3
- Gauge: 4 ft 8 1/2 in (1,435 mm) standard gauge
- Leading dia.: 3 ft 3 1/2 in (1.003 m)
- Driver dia.: 6 ft 9 in (2.057 m)
- Length: 64 ft 8 3/4 in (19.73 m)
- Loco weight: 79.55 long tons (80.83 t; 89.10 short tons)
- Tender weight: 54.65 long tons (55.53 t; 61.21 short tons)
- Fuel type: Coal
- Fuel capacity: 9.0 long tons (9.1 t; 10.1 short tons)
- Water cap.: 4,000 imp gal (18,000 L; 4,800 US gal)
- Boiler: LMS type 3A
- Boiler pressure: 225 lbf/in^{2} (1.55 MPa) superheated
- Cylinders: Three
- Cylinder size: 17 in × 26 in (432 mm × 660 mm)
- Valve gear: Walschaerts
- Valve type: Piston valves
- Train heating: Steam Heat
- Loco brake: Vacuum
Performance figures
- Tractive effort: 26,610 lbf (118.37 kN)
Career
- Operators: London, Midland and Scottish Railway; → British Railways
- Power class: LMS: 5XP; BR: 6P
- Nicknames: 45627 Sierra Leone
- Axle load class: BR: Route Availability 8
- Withdrawn: November 1964
- Restored: April 2013
- Current owner: West Coast Railways
- Disposition: Operational

London, Midland and Scottish Railway (LMS) Jubilee Class No. 5699 (BR No. 45699) Galatea is a preserved British 4-6-0 steam locomotive. Since 2021 the locomotive has been painted as scrapped sister locomotive 45627 Sierra Leone.

== History ==
5699 was built at Crewe Works in April 1936 and named Galatea after HMS Galatea, which in turn was named after the Galatea of mythology.

From new it was allocated to Newton Heath shed in Manchester where it remained until October 1937 when it was transferred to Millhouses in Sheffield. It was not transferred again until November 1944, when it was allocated to Derby. In 1946, it was transferred to Nottingham and Holbeck, Leeds. After British Railways took over operation of Britain's railway network in 1948, 5699 was renumbered to British Railways number 45699 and in May was transferred to Bristol Barrow Road.

On 16 August 1953, Galatea was derailed while hauling a passenger train at Wilnecote. The derailment was caused by a combination of defects on the locomotive and the condition of the track. The locomotive ended up on its side, but it was hardly damaged and only two people were reported injured.

Its final shed allocation was at Shrewsbury where it remained until November 1964, when it was withdrawn from service. After withdrawal it was stored at Eastleigh Works in December 1964, and remained there until January of the following year when it was moved by rail to Woodham Brothers scrapyard in Barry, Wales.

=== Allocation history ===
The locations of (4)5699 Galatea on particular dates.

18 April 1936 (First Shed)	Newton Heath
2 October 1937	Millhouses
4 November 1944	Derby
12 October 1946	Nottingham
3 November 1946	Holbeck, Leeds, 22A then 55A
29 May 1948	Bristol Barrow Road, 22A then 82E
9 October 1961 (Final Shed)	Shrewsbury, 84G then 89A
21 November 1964	Withdrawn
December 1964	Stored at Eastleigh Works
January 1965	Transferred to Barry Scrapyard
April 1980	Purchased for Preservation.
April 2013	Restored to working order

== Preservation ==
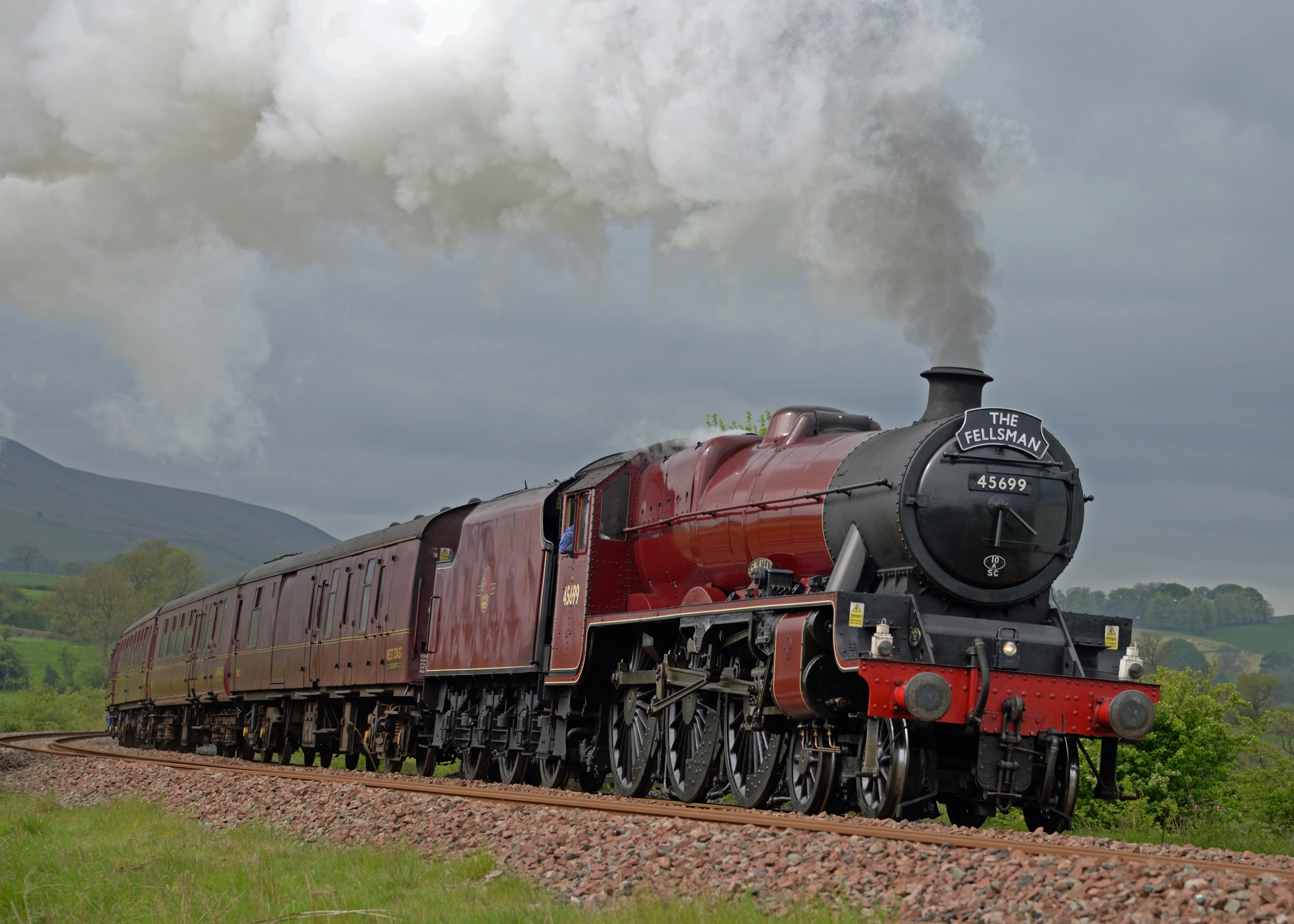
45699 Galatea with The Fellsman near Rimington

Galatea was rescued in April 1980 from Woodham Brothers scrapyard in Barry, South Wales by the late Brian Oliver and was moved to the Severn Valley Railway originally to provide a spare boiler for preserved sister engine 45690 Leander.

45699 was at Tyseley Locomotive Works until 2002 when it was sold to the West Coast Railways and moved to Steamtown Carnforth where it was given a complete rebuild. This also included the manufacturing of a new middle driving wheel after the original was cut through after a shunting accident at Barry Island.

45699 returned to steam in April 2013 on test runs around the Hellifield circle. When 45699 emerged on its first test run it was wearing the identity of its fellow class member No. 5690 Leander. Galatea made its railtour debut on 19 May 2013 working a private charter from King's Lynn to Norwich.

In May 2014, it made its first ever operational visit to a heritage railway, when it visited the Mid Norfolk Railway at Dereham for their West Coast Railways steam gala, during which it ran alongside fellow Carnforth-based engines LMS Rebuilt Royal Scot 4-6-0 no 46115 Scots Guardsman and LMS Stanier Class 8F 2-8-0 no 48151. All three engines ran in triple-headed formation from Carnforth to Dereham on Thursday 29 May. The three engines then ran during the three day gala from Friday 30 May to Sunday 1 June. The following day, Monday 2 June, the three engines returned to Carnforth along with the nine Mark 1 coaches that had been provided for the gala because most coaches at the Mid Norfolk Railway are air-braked, whereas the three engines and the Mark 1 coaches are vacuum-braked.

In November 2019, 45699 was repainted into British Railways Brunswick green with the late crest and renumbered as scrapped classmate No. 45562 'Alberta' after running in British Railways crimson lake livery since April 2013. In July 2021, It had another change of identity and began running as No. 45627 'Sierra Leone', though its cabside number remains 45562 in this guise. As of May 2026, it is still running as Sierra Leone now with 45627 cabside numbers and yellow cabside stripes.

In March 2022, the engine was withdrawn for overhaul which was undertaken at West Coast Railway's base in Carnforth, Lancashire. The engine returned to service 11 months later in February 2023.

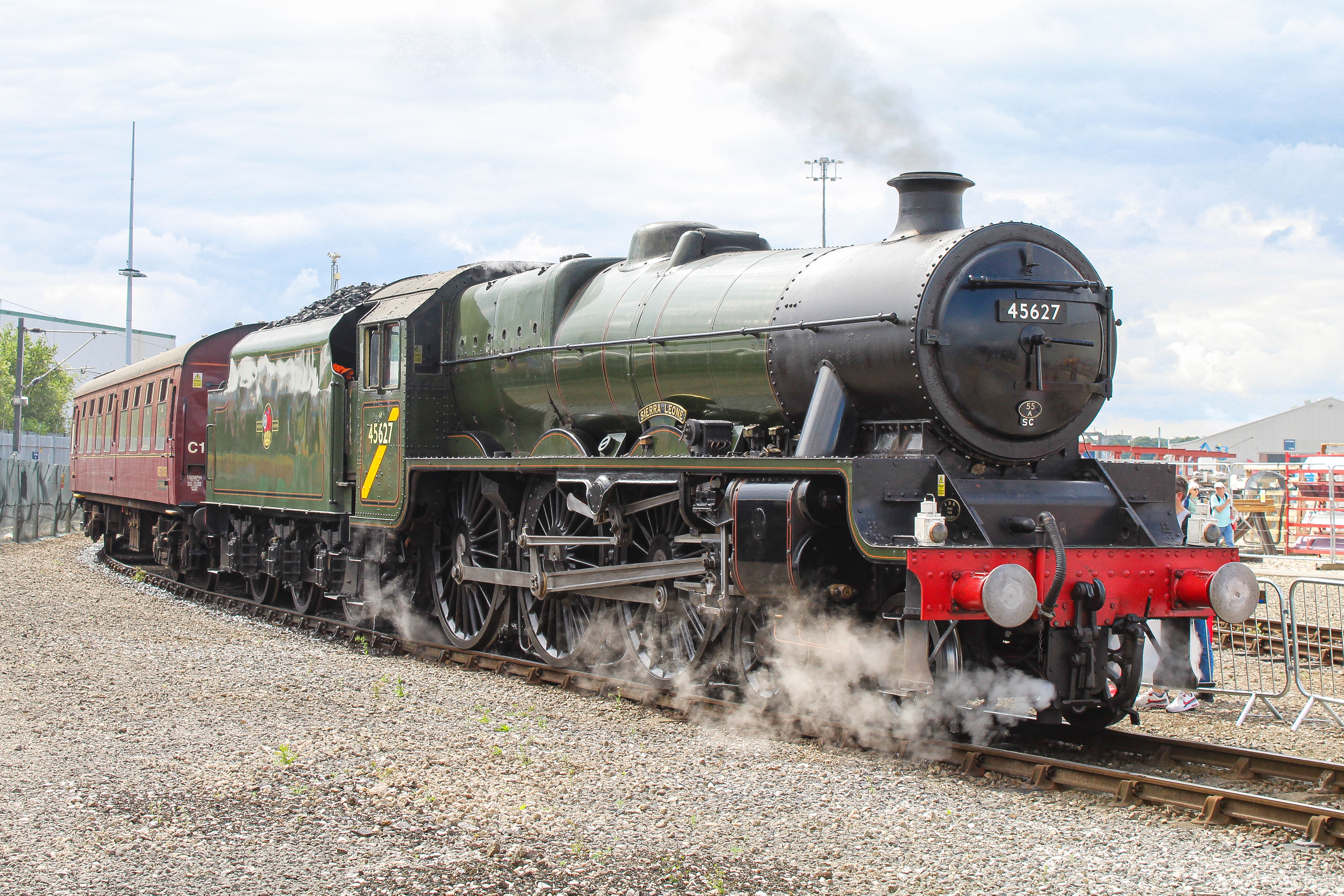
45627 Sierra Leone at the Greatest Gathering, Derby Litchurch Lane Works (2025)

In April 2025, 45699 while still running as No. 45627 'Sierra Leone' was to make its first operational visit to its old home at the Severn Valley Railway. The locomotive was chosen to appear at the railway's Spring Steam Gala alongside classmate No. 45596 'Bahamas' and newly completed locomotive No. 6880 'Betton Grange' alongside the railway's home fleet of operational steam locomotives. The gala which ran from Fri 18 April to Mon 21 April had services only operate between Hampton Loade and Kidderminster due to the landslip between Hampton Loade and Bridgnorth in January 2025.

=== The Greatest Gathering ===
In June 2025, it was announced that 45699 while still disguised as scrapped classmate 45627 'Sierra Leone' was to appear at The Greatest Gathering which was taking place from Friday 1 to Sunday 3 August 2025 at Derby Litchurch Lane Works as part of the rail 200 celebrations to celebrate 200 years of railways and the opening of the Stockton and Darlington Railway in 1825.

During the event 45699 was used for the steam train rides along the Litchurch Lane Works site running top and tailed with a British Rail Class 37 at the other end. Galatea was one of two jubilee's to attend the event as fellow classmate No. 45596 'Bahamas' was also chosen to attend the event.
