= Northwich Motive Power Depot =

Former railway maintenance depot in Northwich, Cheshire

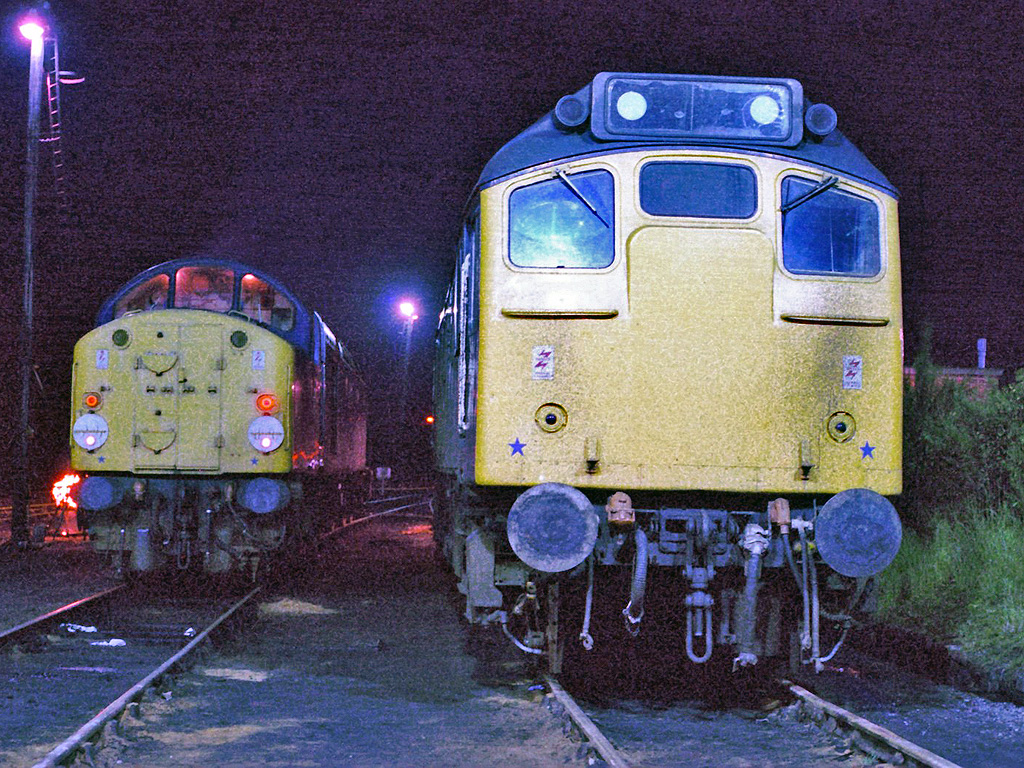
- A Class 25 and a Class 40 diesel locomotive outside the depot
- Interactive map of Northwich Motive Power Depot

Location
- Location: Northwich, Cheshire
- Coordinates: 53.2609°N 2.4961°W
- OS grid: SJ670738

Characteristics
- Owner: British Rail
- Depot code: NW (1973 - 1984)
- Type: Diesel

History
- Closed: 1984
- Former depot code: 39J (1 February 1950 - 30 April 1950) 9G (1 May 1950 - 31 March 1958) 8E (1 April 1958 - 5 May 1973)

Northwich Motive Power Depot was a traction maintenance depot located in Northwich, Cheshire, England. The depot was situated on the Mid-Cheshire line and was located immediately to the southeast of Northwich station.

The depot code was latterly NW.

== History ==
Before its closure in 1984, Class 08 shunters, Class 25 and 40 locomotives could be seen at the depot.
