= LMS Jubilee Class 5690 Leander =

LMS 5690 Leander
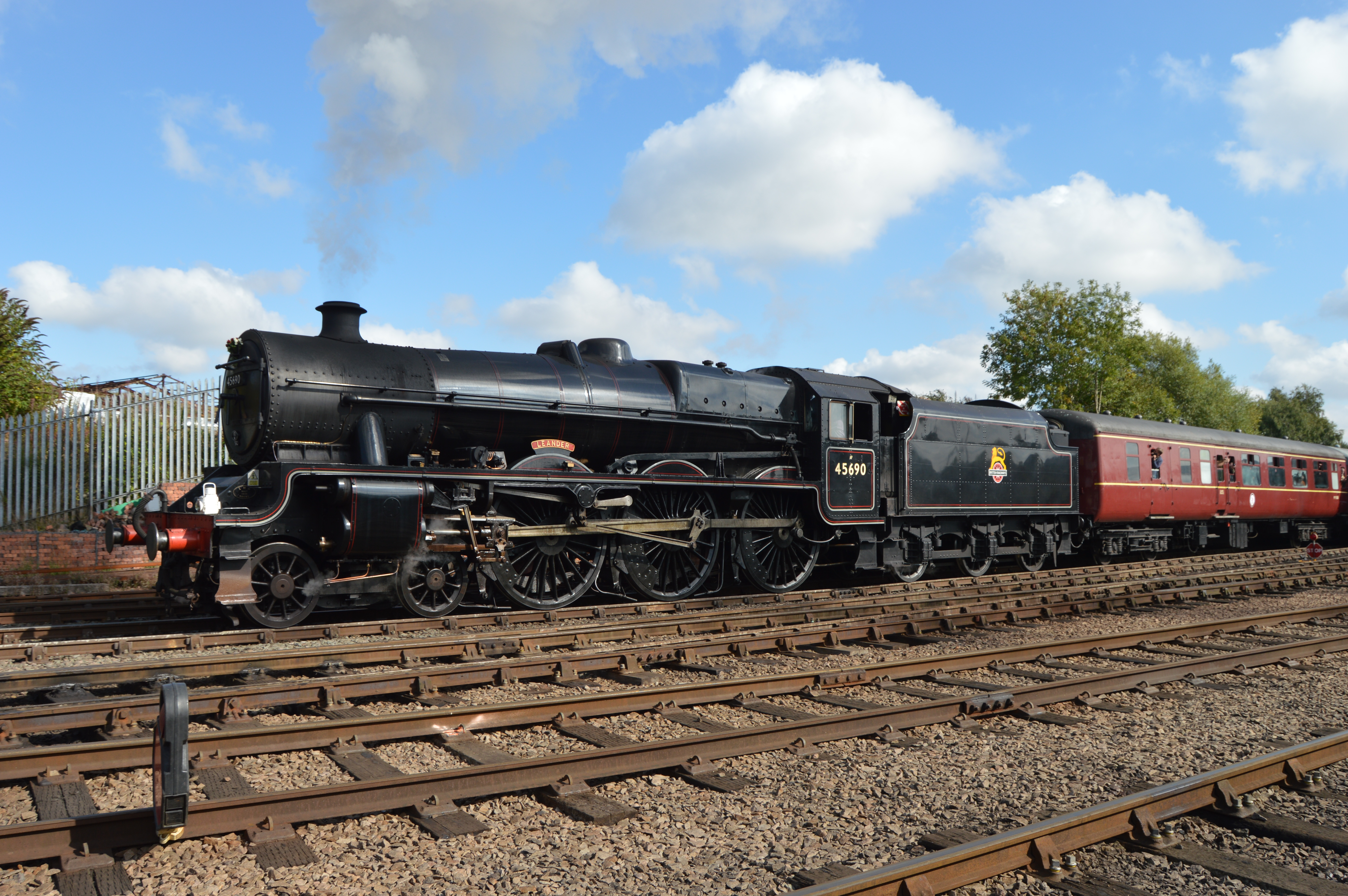
- Leander at Barrow Hill Roundhouse during the "Ticket to Ride" LMS Gala in Sept 2015.
Type and origin
- Power type: Steam
- Designer: William Stanier
- Builder: Crewe Works
- Order number: LMS Lot 122
- Build date: March 1936
Specifications
- Configuration
  - Whyte: 4-6-0
  - UIC: 2′C h3
- Gauge: 4 ft 8 1/2 in (1,435 mm) standard gauge
- Leading dia.: 3 ft 3 1/2 in (1.003 m)
- Driver dia.: 6 ft 9 in (2.057 m)
- Length: 64 ft 8 3/4 in (19.73 m)
- Loco weight: 79.55 long tons (80.83 t; 89.10 short tons)
- Tender weight: 54.65 long tons (55.53 t; 61.21 short tons)
- Fuel type: Coal
- Fuel capacity: 9.0 long tons (9.1 t; 10.1 short tons)
- Water cap.: 4,000 imp gal (18,000 L; 4,800 US gal)
- Boiler: LMS type 3A
- Boiler pressure: 225 lbf/in^{2} (1.55 MPa) superheated
- Cylinders: Three
- Cylinder size: 17 in × 26 in (432 mm × 660 mm)
- Valve gear: Walschaerts
- Valve type: Piston valves
- Train heating: Steam Heat
Performance figures
- Tractive effort: 26,610 lbf (118.37 kN)
Career
- Operators: London, Midland and Scottish Railway; → British Railways
- Power class: LMS: 5XP; BR: 6P
- Axle load class: BR: Route Availability 8
- First run: March 1936
- Last run: 1964
- Retired: 1964
- Withdrawn: 1964
- Restored: May 1972
- Current owner: Chris Beet
- Disposition: Operational

London, Midland and Scottish Railway (LMS) Jubilee Class No. 5690 (BR No. 45690) Leander is a preserved British 4-6-0 steam locomotive.

== Operational history ==
5690 was built at Crewe in March 1936 and named Leander after HMS Leander, which in turn was named after the Greek hero Leander. From March 1936 it was based at Crewe North shed where it remained until 1947 when it was transferred to the former LMS engine shed at Bristol (Barrow Road). After nationalisation in 1948, it was renumbered 45690 by British Railways.

After being withdrawn in 1964, Leander was sold to Woodham Brothers scrapyard in Barry, South Wales.

== Preservation ==
Rescued in May 1972, it was restored by the Leander Locomotive Society at Derby and later kept at the Dinting Railway Museum, Glossop. After later purchase by and running on the Severn Valley Railway, Leander was sold to Dr Peter Beet, and restored to running condition on the East Lancashire Railway in LMS Crimson Lake livery. As of 2008, Leander was owned by Chris Beet (Engineering and Rail Operations Manager, National Railway Museum) and operated by the West Coast Railway Company from their Carnforth MPD base.

In 2008, Leander provided motive power for the Scarborough Spa Express heritage service. It also spent October at the Great Central Railway "Steam Railway" gala, alongside Britannia Class No. 70013 Oliver Cromwell and LNER Peppercorn Class A1 No. 60163 Tornado.

In September 2010, Leander visited the Severn Valley Railway (SVR) for their 40th anniversary Autumn steam gala alongside fellow visiting locomotives and former Severn Valley based engines 2251 Class No. 3205, No. 3717 City of Truro, 4575 Class No. 5542 and West Country Class No. 34070 Manston. Leander departed from the SVR at the beginning of October hauling the Severn Valley Limited to Blackpool North one way only as the locomotive was en route to the East Lancashire Railway for a few weeks stay during their Autumn Steam Gala. Shortly afterwards, Leander returned to Carnforth and mainline operation.

In April 2012, Leander was withdrawn early for overhaul due to its poor condition. Chris Beet managed the overhaul, assisted by the team at West Coast Railway Company from their Carnforth MPD base. It returned to operation in October 2014, painted in BR Lined Black, the livery that it carried between 12 April 1949 and 15 November 1952, and which was also carried by 46 other members of the class from August 1948.

Leanders first revenue earning run was to be on 24 January 2015 when it was to double head with 45407 The Lancashire Fusilier at the head of Railway Touring Company's Winter Cumbrian Mountain Express which would run from Manchester Victoria over Shap Summit to Carlisle and back along the Settle-Carlisle line, however it failed its FTR exam. As a result its first revenue earning run was RTC's Hadrian which ran from Preston over Shap Summit to Carlisle and then back to Preston via Haltwhistle, Darlington, York and Manchester on 7 March 2015. It double headed with 45407 for the trip, acting as its train engine.

On 10 July 2022, Leander suffered a failed super heater element while working RTC's Waverley railtour on 10 Jul 2022. The engine was failed in Carlisle and dragged back to Hellifield behind a British Rail Class 47 No 47804 before being taken back to Carnforth MPD, 45690 returned to operational service in April 2023 following repairs. As of October 2023, Leander is in the final few months of its present boiler certificate which was due to expire in November 2023, this has now been extended to January 2024.

Leander worked its final railtour on 30 September 2023 which was RTC's Cumbrian Coast Express with Leander hauling the train from Carlisle to Carnforth travelling down the Cumbrian Coast and Furness Line running via Workington, Ravenglass and Grange-over-Sands. The London Euston to Carlisle & Carnforth to London Euston legs being worked by 86259 Les Ross. It was then moved by rail to the East Lancashire Railway the following day, it is to now see out the remainder of its ticket at the ELR until it is withdrawn from traffic. Following which it will be returned to Carnforth for overhaul.

In February 2024, it was announced that following its appearance at the East Lancs Railway's "Legends of Steam" gala in March 2024 the loco would be moved by road to the Lakeside and Haverthwaite Railway to spend a few days working alongside Chris Beet's second engine LMS Ivatt Class 2 2-6-0 number 46441 over the weekend of 23 and 24 March. Following its visit to Haverthwaite the engine will then be moved by road to the Mid Hants Railway to appear at their steam gala over the weekend of 26 to 28 April & then make its final appearance running at the Epping Ongar Railway at their steam gala weekend on 4 to 6 May, its final steamings will take place on the weekend of 11 and 12 May before expiry of the engines extended boiler certificate.

In an interview with Chris Beet regarding if Leander would go through another overhaul after it is withdrawn, Chris stated: "Twelve months ago I wasn't convinced we'd do it again and I'm still not convinced now. I'm 57 in October, in ten years I'll be 67 and I'll be done. If it does take place it's possible that Leander will appear in a new guise rather than Crimson Lake or BR Lined Black that it carried in Preservation. She was going to be repainted green this ticket but we never got round to it, however whatever colour she is in it will boil water".

=== Upcoming overhaul ===
In an interview by Steam Railway with Chris Beet in June he stated: "Leander has run well with very few problems and got safely through to the end of her ticket. The extra income from the additional running is a bonus and will certainly help with the cost of the overhaul. It was certainly great to get our two locomotives together at Lakeside which was a first - and hopefully not the last. Going to the Mid-Hants and Epping Ongar railways was a great experience, being in the south of England for a change. We never really planned to have an end-of-ticket tour of heritage railways but that's how it ended up, mainly owing to road transport costs". Chris further added: "Leander's overhaul has already begun with the removal of the brick arch and washing out of the boiler. The engine will be winterised while we work on the tender - fitting the new tender tank and repairs to the drag box. Once the tender is done we'll move on to the loco: new ashpan (as normal), change some stays, renew the smoke tubes and flues, and refurbish brake gear, in addition to any work that shows up when the boiler is stripped down. I think the overhaul will take a few years depending on the volunteer team's input; fewer people means it will take longer".

In a final comment on whether Leander's overhaul would be the last under its current overhaul, Beet Said: "It's hypothetical as we are talking ten years plus into the future and the heritage railway/main line landscape will have changed. Who knows? Realistically, I'm 56 years old; if we can get 45690 running again by the time I'm 60, then I'll be about 70 when the next overhaul is due".

=== Fame in Preservation ===
5690 Leander at Boar's Head

To mark the re-opening of the Conwy Valley line in August 2019 following a closure period after suffering from multiple washouts inflicted from Storm Gareth, on 3 August 2019 Leander double headed the Conwy Quest railtour from Chester to Blaenau Ffestiniog via Llandudno Junction while double heading with 48151. It was also covering for the unavailable LMS Royal Scot No. 46115 Scots Guardsman which had been failed days before with a hot axlebox during a test run. With the route's gradient being 1 in 45 heading towards Blaenau Ffestiniog, no members of the class ran along the branch in LMS & BR days and until Aug 2019 none had been down the branch in preservation. 45690 was therefore the first member of the class to run along the Conwy Valley Line and visit Blaenau Ffestiniog. The journey from Chester to Llandudno Junction & from Blaenau Ffestiniog to Llandudno Junction was done with the engines running tender first with the other legs being with the engines running chimney first.
