= Grangemouth TMD =

Former traction maintenance depot in Grangemouth, Falkirk

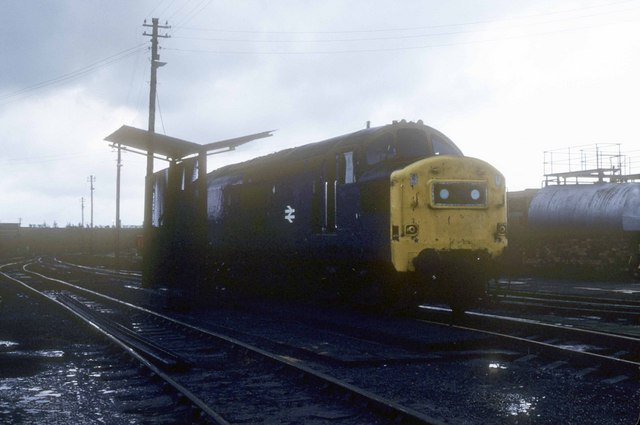
- A Class 37 locomotive at Grangemouth TMD in 1982
- Interactive map of Grangemouth TMD

Location
- Location: Grangemouth, Falkirk
- Coordinates: 56.0084°N 3.7442°W
- OS grid: NS913808

Characteristics
- Owner: British Rail
- Depot code: GM (1973 -)
- Type: Diesel

History
- Opened: 1908
- Closed: 1993

Grangemouth TMD was a traction maintenance depot located in Grangemouth, Scotland. The depot was situated on the Edinburgh to Dunblane Line and was near Falkirk Grahamston station.

The depot code is GM.

== History ==
Before its closure in 1993, Class 06 and 08 shunters could be seen at the depot.
