= Carnforth MPD =

Railway depot in Lancashire, England

Coordinates: 54.1311°N 2.7727°W

Carnforth MPD (Motive Power Depot) is a former London Midland and Scottish Railway railway depot located in the town of Carnforth, Lancashire, England.

Completed in 1944 on the site of the former Furness Railway depot, its late construction in the steam locomotive age resulted in its long-term use and conservation by British Railways. Targeted as part of a preservation scheme, when this failed it was developed as major visitor attraction Steamtown Carnforth. Today, closed as a museum, it acts as the major national operational base of West Coast Railways.

== Importance of Carnforth ==
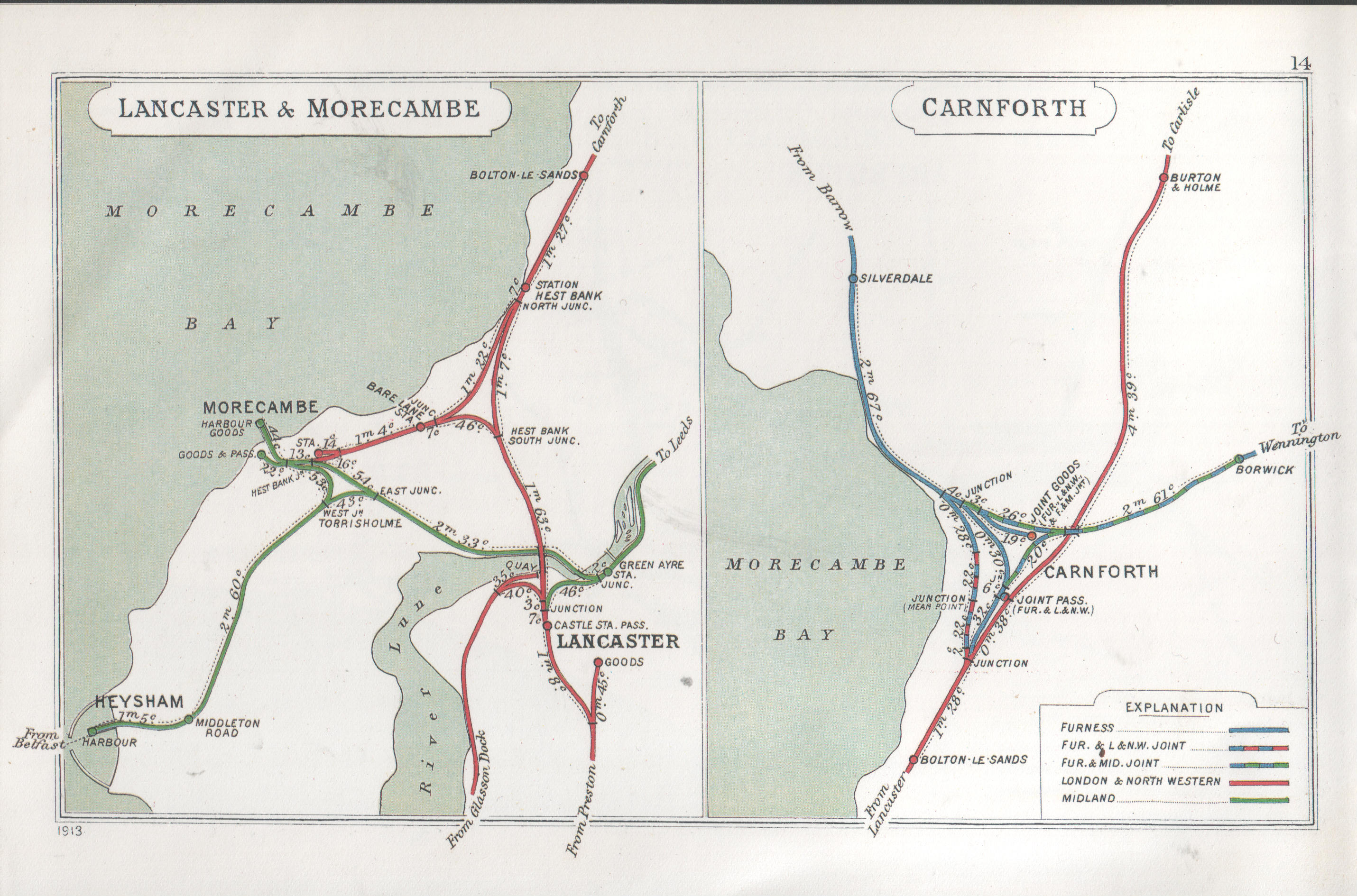
District railway map, Carnforth (right), 1914

Carnforth was not an important or well developed village before the Victorian era railway age, but was geographically strategically located to make it so. While supplies of limestone made it interesting, access into Westmorland, the Lake District and the coast of Cumberland beyond made it an ideal transport hub point.

Carnforth railway station opened as a single platform wooden structure for access to the then village, but was made into a permanent stone structure by the Lancaster and Carlisle Railway (L&CR) in 1846. In 1857 it became a junction station when the Ulverston and Lancaster Railway used it, as did the Furness Railway soon afterwards after taking control of the ULR. The Furness Railway built their own Engine Shed west of the Station; and it is this Shed which was later developed into the present facility. In the 1870s architect William Tite redesigned the station and layout, allowing Midland Railway trains access. The regionally competing London and North Western Railway (LNWR) took over the L&CR, and created a jointly - This growth continued from the late-Victorian era to post World War II and into the early 1950s. At its height Carnforth handled up to 100 trains a day of holidaymakers, commuters, freight and fuel bound for the seaside, cities, ports and industrial centres.

== History ==
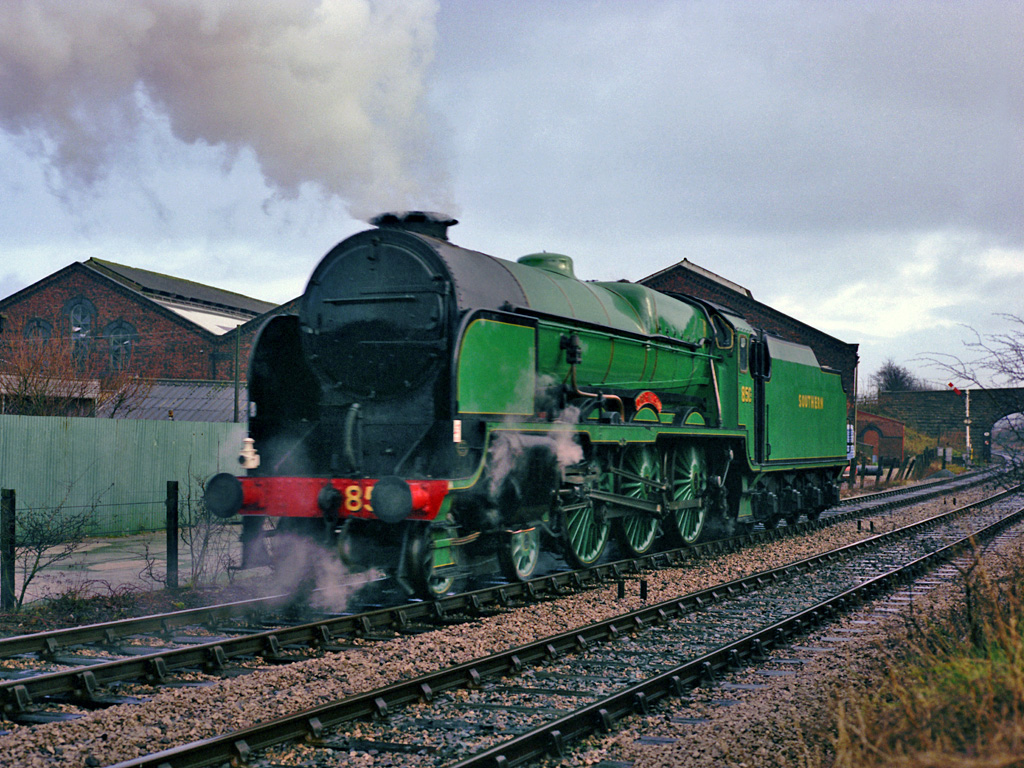
Lord Nelson Class No.850 Lord Nelson passes the former Midland Railway roundhouse, running light engine from Steamtown to Hellifield, 27 November 1982

When the Midland Railway reached Carnforth in 1857, it developed a small roundhouse depot and maintenance shed to service its locomotive stock. In Midland days, the Shed was coded "31". The building is still in use as a light industrial facility. In the 1880s the LNWR had rebuilt the small two-road L&CR facility south of the station into a standard-pattern LNWR 6-road facility.

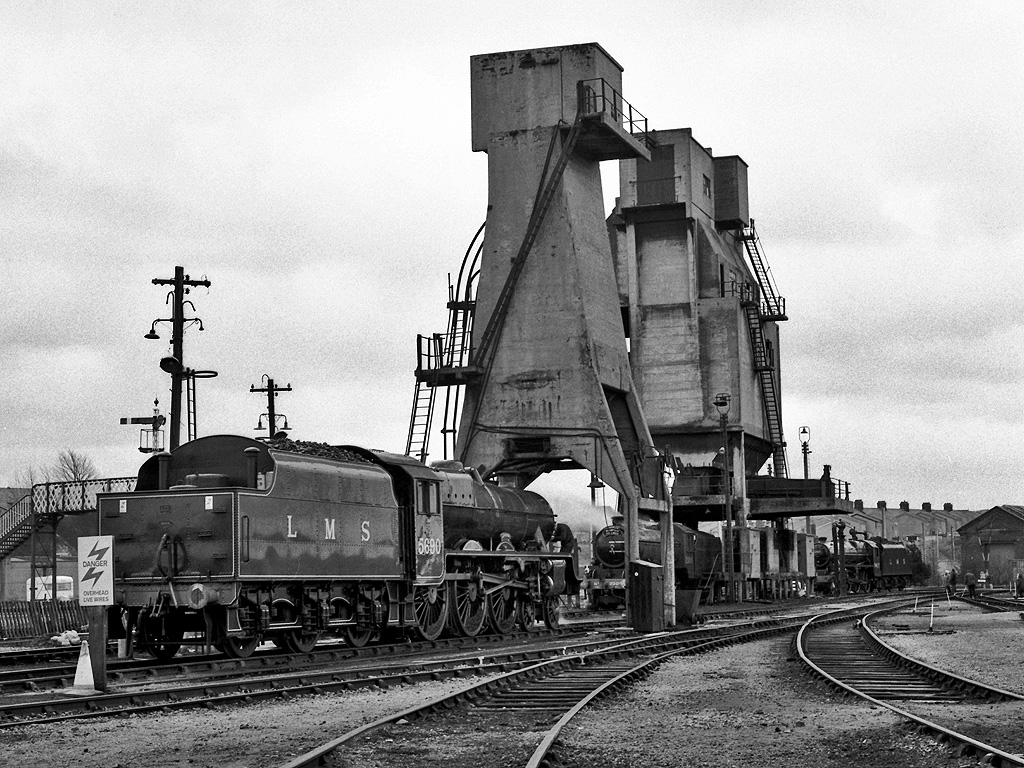
Preserved LMS Jubilee Class No.5690 Leander moves towards the ash tower with the giant cast-concrete coal stage beyond at Carnforth MPD, built during the 1944 reconstruction of the shed

At the railway grouping in 1923, the London Midland and Scottish Railway was created by amalgamation of the MR and the LNWR, together with other railway companies. About 1925, the Furness Shed at Carnforth was closed – the LNWR [Code, Sub of Preston No 27] and Midland Sheds continuing in use for the time being. It was only the largest three constituents of the LMS (LNWR, L&YR and Mid) which used shed codes. In 1935, the LMS reorganised the Operating Department; and introduced one composite list of codes to cover the entire system. And Carnforth became 11A – even though the depot was spread over two different sites. Resolution of that deficiency had to wait until after the advent of War.

From 1936 onwards under instruction from the Air Ministry's Sir Kingsley Wood, in a programme headed by Herbert Austin many key industries in London and the industrialised Midlands, had created a shadow factory to enable production should war break out. Many of these shadow factories, plus a number of Royal Ordnance Factories, were located in Cumbria and the Northwest coast, out of range of the bombers of the Nazi Luftwaffe. Consequently, when World War 2 did break out, staff moved and additionals were recruited to these facilities. The raw materials going in and requirement of distribution of output, the transport result was a relative boom in both freight and passenger traffic.

With the United States involved in the war from 1941, planning for Operation Overlord the invasion of Europe began. The Port of Liverpool and the west coast ports of Scotland were key to importing war machinery and supplies from North America, as well as distributing US Army and Canadian Army troops across England for training, initially in the northwest and northeast. The combination of these factors put a huge strain on local locomotive servicing facilities at Carnforth. Therefore, in late 1942, the Government agreed to fund the construction of a new shed at Carnforth, to allow for the new and planned level of locomotive servicing requirement. Built on the site of the former Furness facility and opened in 1944, it allowed for the servicing of many more locomotives, and together with highly mechanised supporting infrastructure greatly reduced the need for operational manpower. Both the LNWR and the Midland Sheds were closed at this juncture. The new facilities included a 70-foot turntable, which could turn LMS Pacifics.

On nationalisation in 1948, British Railways inherited an almost brand new depot (Code:11A), which was bigger—due to a lack of war activity—than was required. This allowed them to close a number of other local and older or less efficient sheds, and secondly to keep the shed open longer than many when the decision to modernise traction to electric and diesel came. The code was changed to 24L in 1958; and became 10A (the code it is known by nowadays) in 1963. Carnforth MPD remained relatively unchanged from its reconstruction in 1944, until it closed in 1968.

== Steamtown Carnforth ==
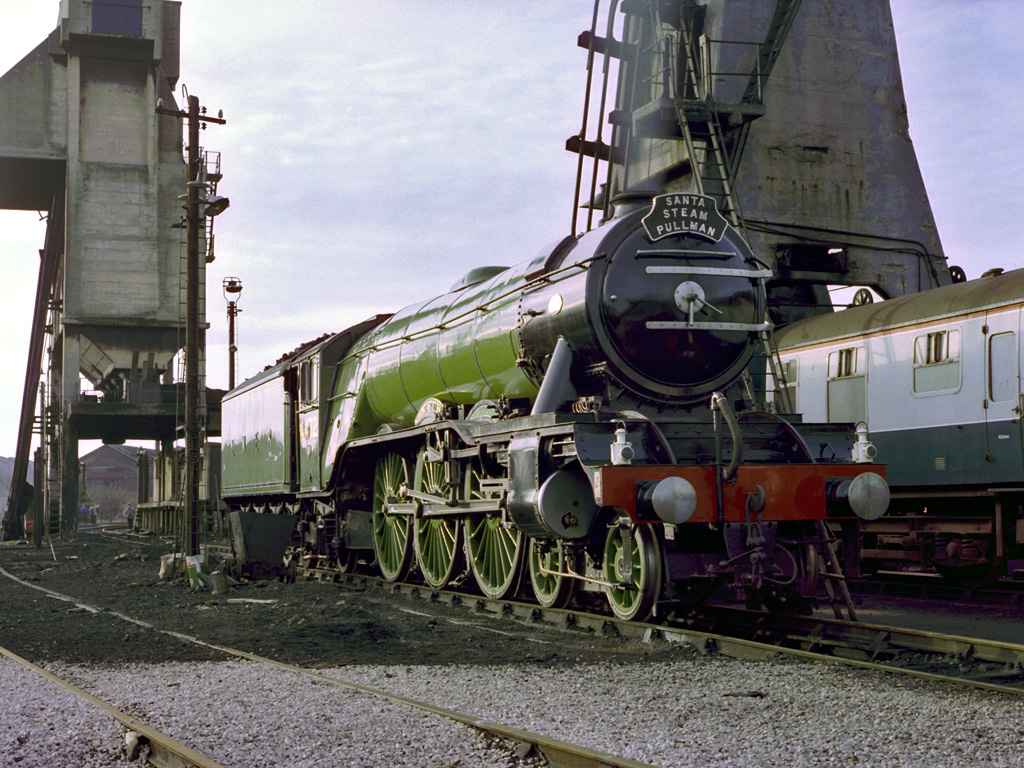
LNER A3 Pacific No.4472 Flying Scotsman at Steamtown Carnforth, prior to working the Carnforth to Sellafield Santa Steam Pullman' charter, 28 December 1982

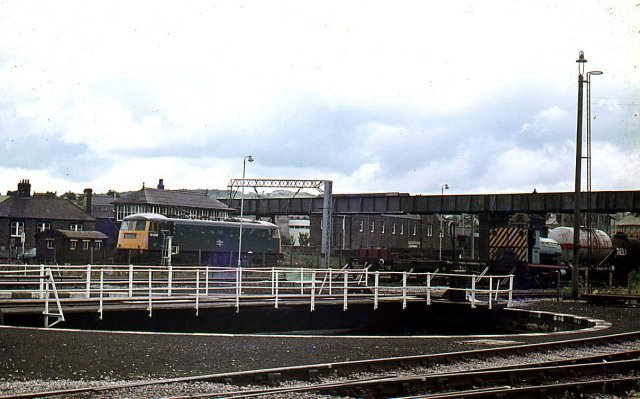
Turntable at Steamtown Carnforth, July 1977

BR closed the Lakeside branch to passengers on 6 September 1965, and to all traffic two years later.

A group of enthusiasts chaired by Dr Peter Beet formed the Lakeside Railway Estates Company, with the idea of preserving both the line and Carnforth MPD, to provide a complete steam operating system. Negotiations with BR resulted in an agreement to buy the majority of the Lakeside branch, and at Carnforth rent out: the former wagon works; west side sidings; and 3-roads of the former MPD. Beet formed Steamtown Railway Museum Ltd, and the resultant visitor attraction Steamtown Carnforth became a mecca for steam enthusiasts, then facing a national ban on steam traction on the BR network. With the assistance of the Lancaster Railway Circle, an increasing number of steam engines arrived at Steamtown from 1967 onwards.

However, although backed by then transport minister Barbara Castle, the need to build a number of motorway bridges and re-routing of the A590 road from Haverthwaite via Greenodd to Plumpton Junction, meant that the complete vision was unsuccessful. This caused a split within the Lakeside Railway society in 1970, with one part of the group forming the Lakeside & Haverthwaite Railway to operate the residual line, taking four of the engines with them.

Steamtown continued under the leadership of Dr Beet, who developed it as a major regional visitor attraction. This included the purchase of both SNCF Chapelon Pacific No. 231.K.22, Deutsche Bundesbahn oil-fired 012 Pacific No. 012 104-6 (né 01 1104), and the development of an extensive 15 in (381 mm) miniature railway.

In 1974 Sir Bill McAlpine became a shareholder in the company, allowing his LNER A3 Pacific 4472 Flying Scotsman to make Carnforth its home for many years. Subsequently, McAlpine acquired a controlling interest in the company, in order to fund the purchase of the complete site including the track from BR.

Even after the mainline steam ban was removed in the early 1970s, the site remained a hub for both enthusiasts and major servicing point for steam locomotives and associated rolling stock. The museum's own stock developed with the purchase of some ex-industrial shunters, and three hulks from Woodham Brothers scrapyard at Barry Island: GWR 6959 Class No.6960 Raveningham Hall; SR Merchant Navy class No.35005 Canadian Pacific; GWR 5600 Class No.5643.

== West Coast Railways ==
McAlpine's interest declined, and resultantly so did Steamtown through lack of investment. In 1990 McAlpine's controlling stake in Steamtown Railway Museum Ltd was sold to David Smith, who over the following years has bought out the majority of the minority shareholders.

With increasing Health and Safety Executive regulations, and an increased reliance on revenue from supplying and servicing steam locomotives to power enthusiast trains, the commercial decision was taken not to reopen Carnforth as a museum or visitor attraction for the 1998 season.

Steamtown Railway Museum Ltd is a holding company, and operates a railway repair and operating facility on the site. Smith later set up West Coast Railways, which operates heritage steam and diesel trains on the national UK railway network. Ex LMS locomotives known to have been based at Carnforth or based at Carnforth following their preservation include: 44767 George Stephenson, 44871, 44932, 45110, 45407 The Lancashire Fusilier, 45690 Leander, 45699 Galatea, 46115 Scots Guardsman, 46441 & 48151. Classes of locomotives which weren't based at Carnforth in LMS and BR days are also based at or were formerly based at Carnforth include: 5972 Olton Hall, 34016 Bodmin, 34067 Tangmere, 34073 249 Squadron, 35018 British India Line & 61994 The Great Marquess.
