= LMS Royal Scot Class 6115 Scots Guardsman =

Preserved 4-6-0 British steam locomotive

LMS 6115 Scots Guardsman
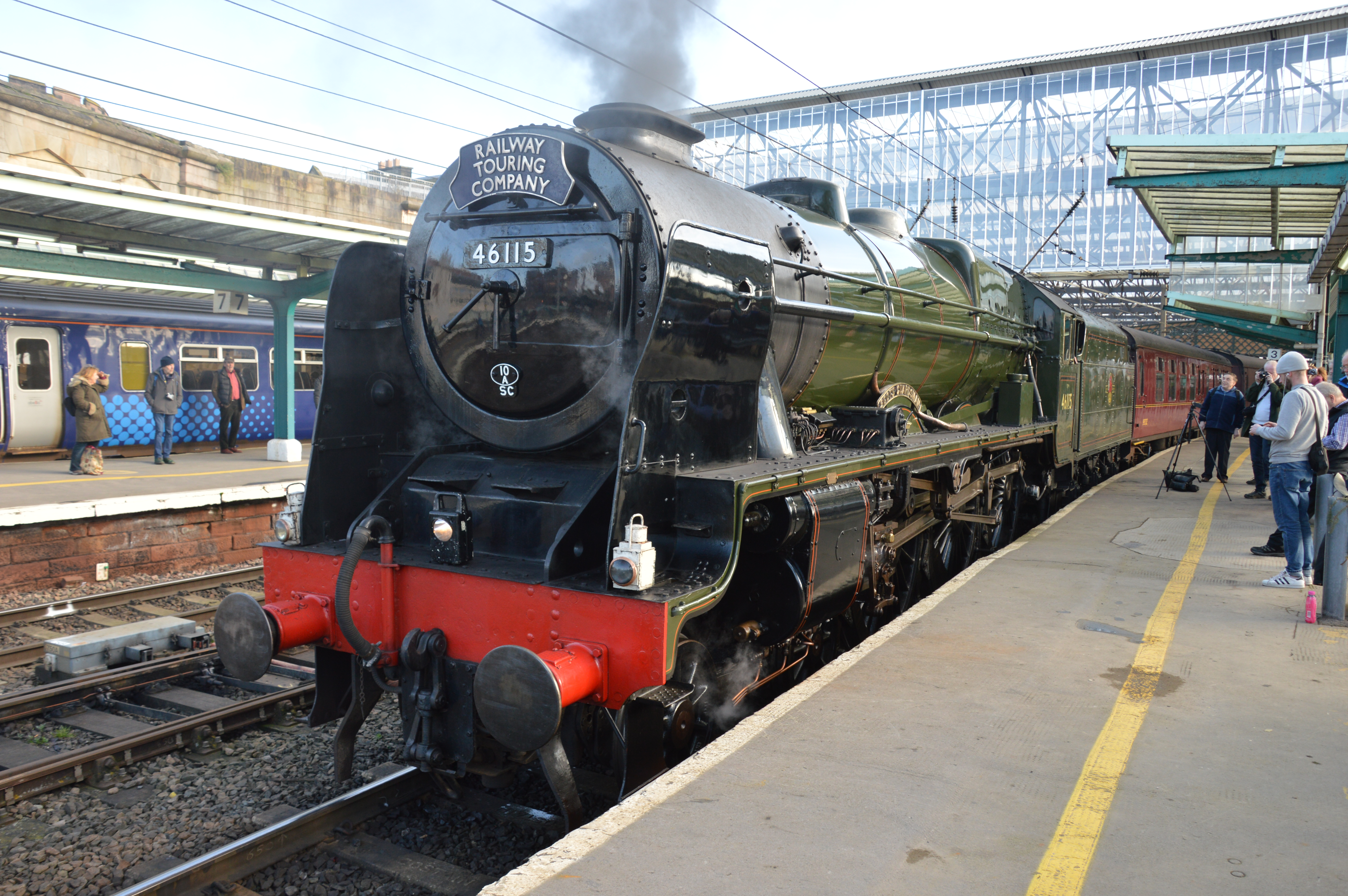
- Freshly overhauled 46115 at Carlisle Citadel on 8 Feb 2020.
Type and origin
- Power type: Steam
- Designer: William Stanier
- Builder: North British Locomotive Company, Glasgow
- Serial number: NBL: 23610
- Build date: October 1927
Specifications
- Configuration
  - Whyte: 4-6-0
  - UIC: 2′C h3
- Gauge: 4 ft 8 1/2 in (1,435 mm)
- Leading dia.: 3 ft 3 1/2 in (1.003 m)
- Driver dia.: 6 ft 9 in (2.057 m)
- Length: 63 ft 0 1/2 in (19.22 m)
- Loco weight: 84.90 long tons (86.26 t; 95.09 short tons)
- Fuel type: Coal
- Fuel capacity: 9 long tons (9.1 t; 10.1 short tons)
- Water cap.: 3,500 imp gal (16,000 L; 4,200 US gal) later: 4,000 imp gal (18,000 L; 4,800 US gal)
- Boiler: G10¼S; rebuilt: 2A
- Boiler pressure: 225 lbf/in^{2} (1.55 MPa)
- Cylinders: Three
- Cylinder size: 18 in × 26 in (457 mm × 660 mm)
- Valve gear: Walschaerts
- Valve type: Piston valves
Performance figures
- Tractive effort: 33,150 lbf (147.46 kN)
Career
- Operators: London, Midland and Scottish Railway; British Railways
- Power class: 6P; reclassified 7P in 1951
- Numbers: LMS: 6115; BR: 46115
- Axle load class: Route availability 9
- Withdrawn: January 1966
- Restored: 20 June 2008
- Current owner: West Coast Railways
- Disposition: Operational

LMS Royal Scot Class 6115 Scots Guardsman is a preserved British 4-6-0 steam locomotive. Built by the London, Midland and Scottish Railway (LMS) as a member of the Royal Scot Class, it was later operated by British Railways.

== History ==
6115 was built in 1927 by the North British Locomotive Company in Springburn, Glasgow. It was named Scots Guardsman in 1928 after the Scots Guards. After receiving smoke deflectors, it starred in the 1936 film Night Mail.

6115 was rebuilt in 1947 with a new tapered type 2A boiler, and was painted in LMS 1946-style black livery. It was the first of the rebuilt engines to receive smoke deflectors and the only one to run with them as an LMS engine. It was renumbered 46115 by British Railways in 1948 and was withdrawn in January 1966.

== Preservation ==
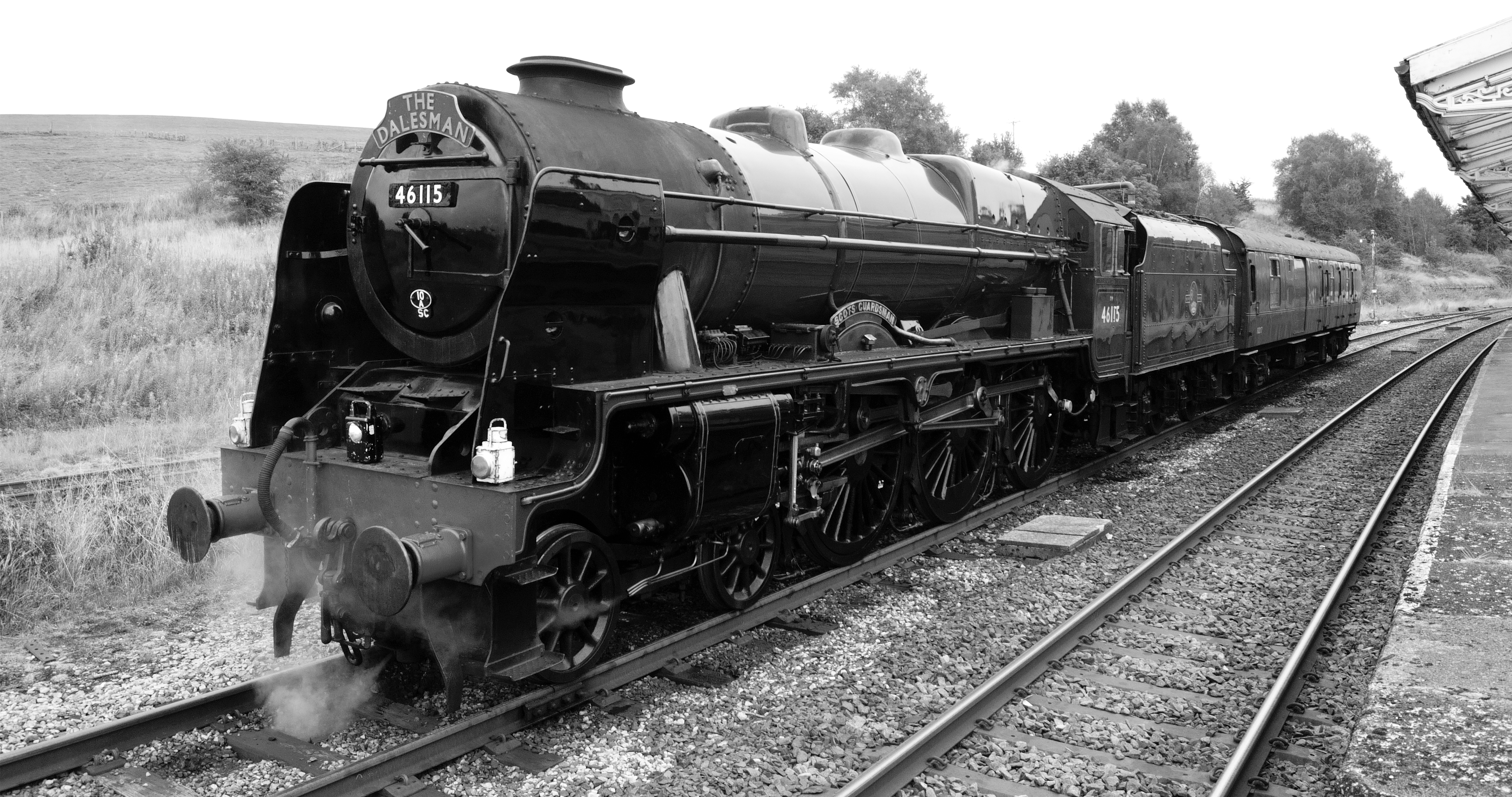
Hi-key monochrome of 46115 Scots Guardsman with "The Dalesman" at Hellifield, in preparation for the Settle - Carlisle run, September 2021

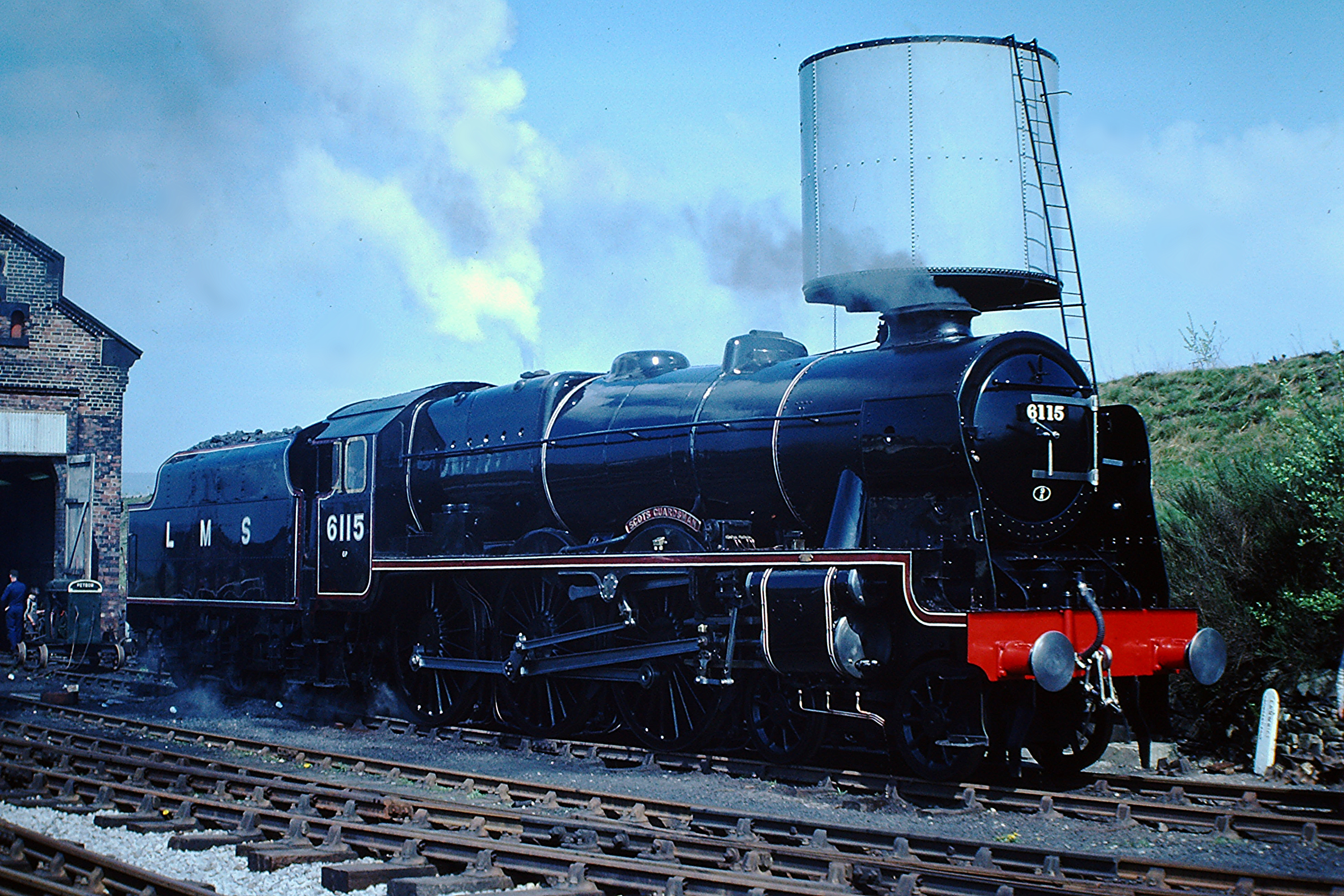
6115 Scots Guardsman in LMS lined black livery at the Dinting Railway Centre, April 1980

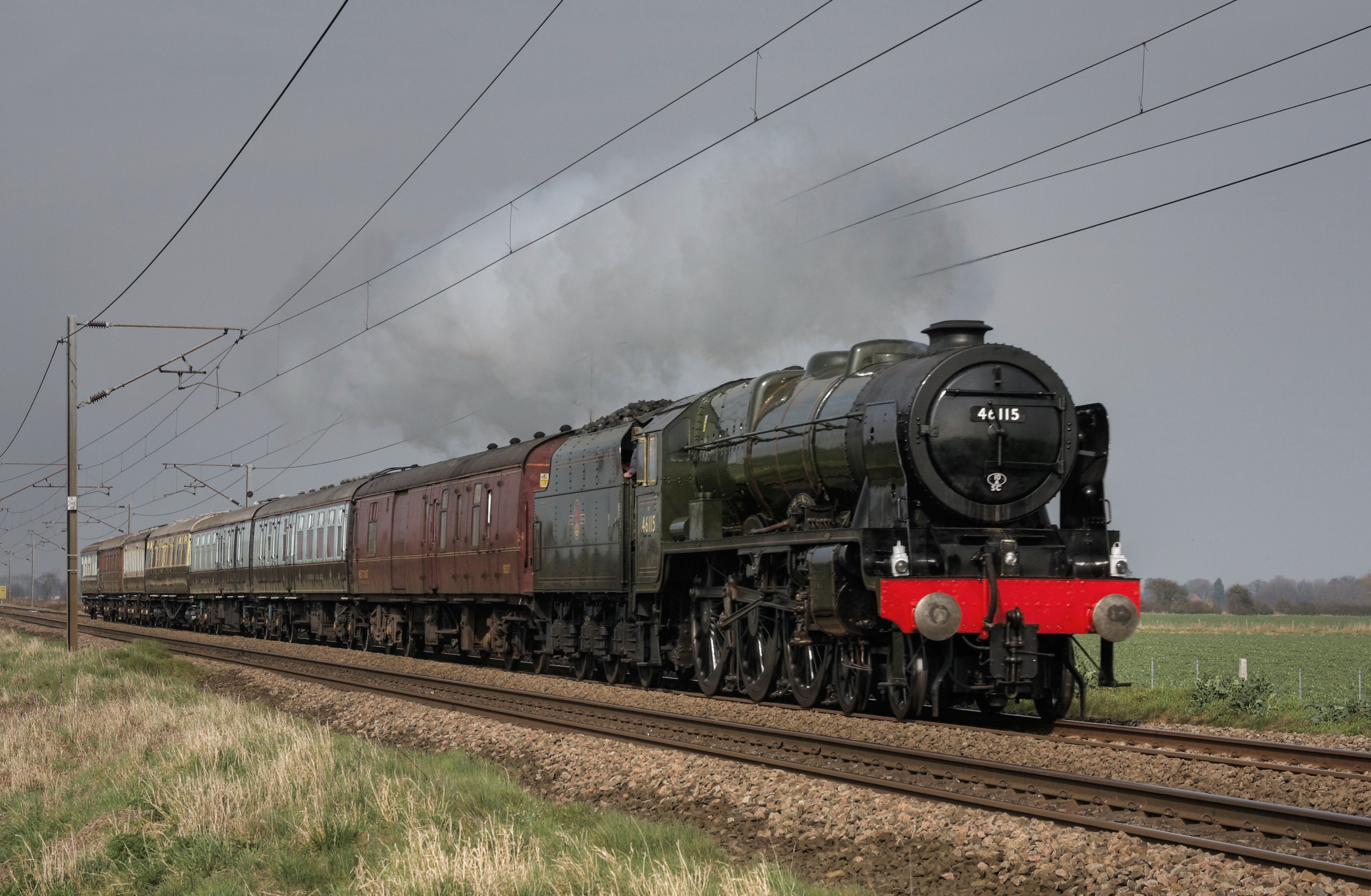
46115 Scots Guardsman at Cromwell Moor in 2009

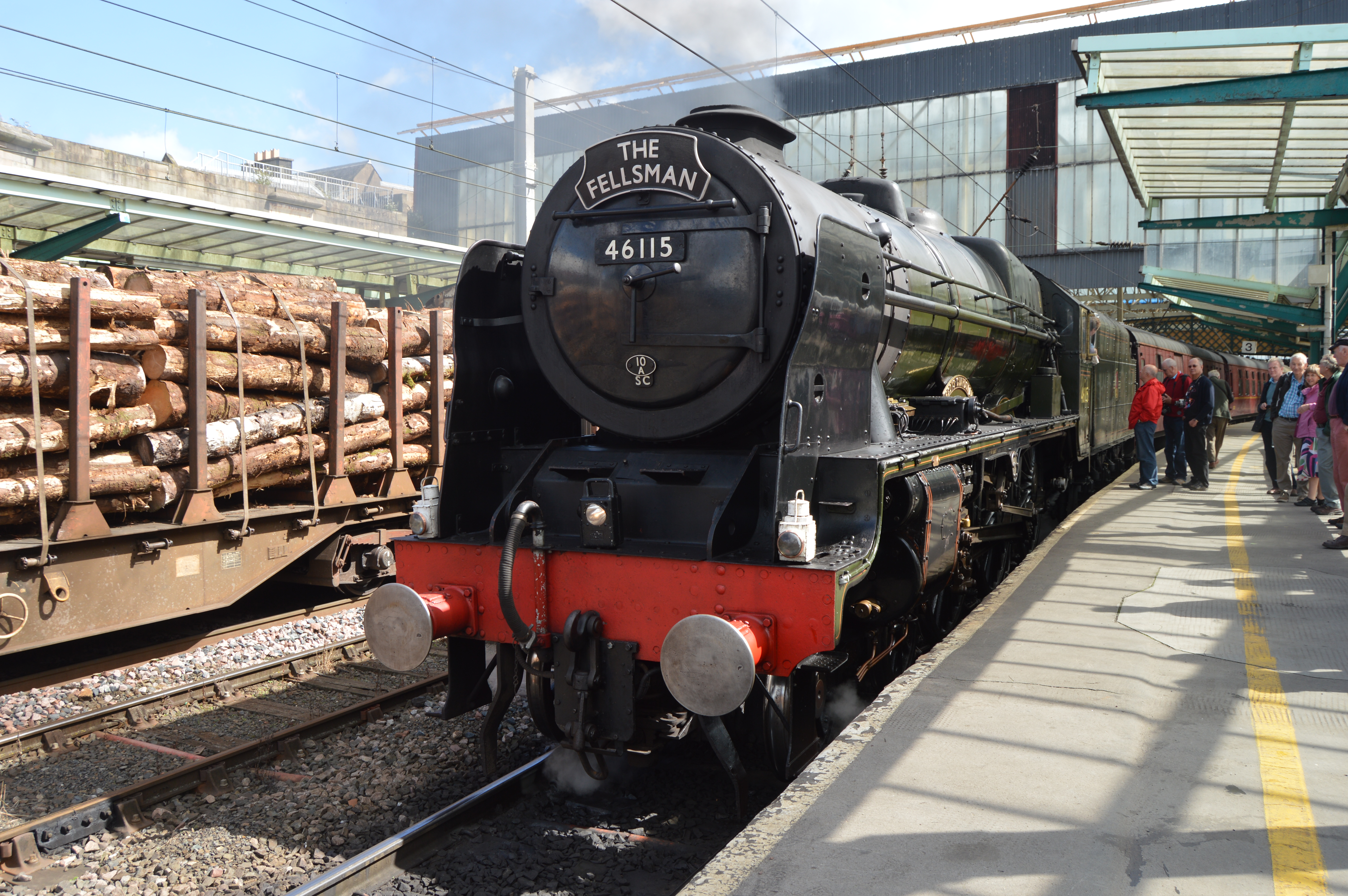
46115 Scots Guardsman at Carlisle in August 2015

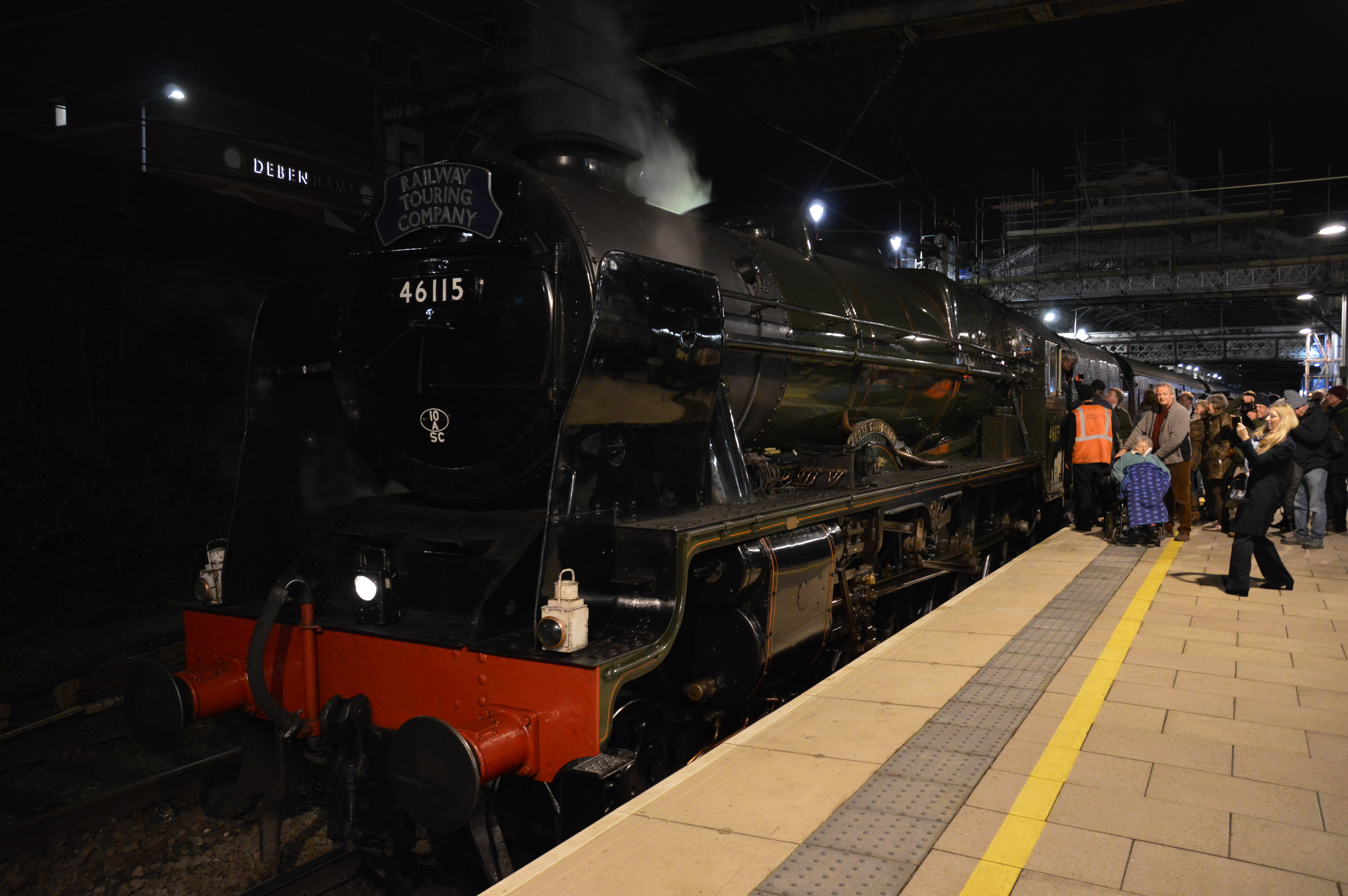
46115 Scots Guardsman stood at the northern end of Preston's platform 6 while waiting for a path home to Carnforth MPD, February 2020

6115 was purchased for preservation by Ron Bill and in 1969 moved to the Dinting Railway Centre. It was later purchased by the 46115 (Scots Guardsman) Steam Locomotive Trust.

In the 1970s, it was based on the Keighley and Worth Valley Railway (KWVR) during the main line steam ban on BR (which was broken in 1971). Due to the branch being only able to operate small engines in the early days of preservation and the weight of 46115 being too much for some bridges, she did not see that much use on the line and eventually departed from the KWVR in the mid-1970s to operate on the main line.

In 2002, 6115 was sold to the Waterman Railway Heritage Trust. 6115 was purchased by the West Coast Railways and in 2008, it was restored to main-line running standard at Carnforth MPD. Its first test run from Carnforth to Hellifield was completed on 20 June 2008. The loco was then repainted BR Brunswick Green, appearing in this livery at the Steamtown Open Weekend on 26/27 July 2008. The loco then hauled its first railtour called The Settle-Carlisle Venturer from Hellifield to Carlisle and returned on 16 August 2008.

On 6 September 2009, 46115 worked "The Yorkshire Scot" from Liverpool Lime Street to York running via Manchester Victoria, Rochdale and Leeds. The tour was run as a special for the centenary of the Girl Guides; it was also for the occasion temporarily renamed to 46168's name The Girl Guide; however it not re-numbered.

In May 2014, it made its second visit to a heritage railway ever, when she visited the Mid Norfolk Railway at Dereham for their West Coast Railways steam gala, during which she ran alongside fellow Carnforth-based engines LMS Jubilee 4-6-0 45699 Galatea and LMS Stanier 8F 2-8-0 48151. All three engines ran in triple headed formation from Carnforth to Dereham on Thursday 29 May. The three engines then ran during the three day gala from Friday 30 May to Sunday 1 June. The following day, Monday 2 June, the three engines returned to Carnforth along with the nine Mark 1 coaches which had also been provided for the gala (due to most coaches at the Mid Norfolk Railway being air braked and the three visitors only being vacuum braked).

Over the summer, it also took turns alongside fellow Carnforth-based engines in working The Fellsman from Lancaster to Carlisle via the Settle and Carlisle Line. Other summer workings include The Dalesman from York to Carlisle running down the Settle and Carlisle with steam taking over at Hellifield, the Cumbrian Mountain Express from London Euston to Carlisle, with one way being worked over Shap Summit and the other traveling down the Settle and Carlisle Line, and the West Coast Railways Scarborough Spa Express from York to Scarborough running via Wakefield Kirkgate and Castleford.

On 16 July 2016, 46115 made its third visit to a heritage railway when she worked The Railway Touring Company's West Somerset Steam Express from London Paddington to Bishops Lydeard running via Reading, Newbury and Westbury. From Bishops Lydeard S&DJR 7F 2-8-0 no 53808 took over the train for the journey to Minehead and then returned the train to Bishops Lydeard where 46115 took over for the journey back to London via the outward route.

On 26 July 2016, 46115 made its first appearance on the Conwy Valley line when she worked RTC's Welsh Mountaineer from Preston to Blaenau Ffestiniog running via Chester and Llandudno Junction. This was also the first time a Royal Scot had ever gone up the branch, as none of the class ran up the line in the steam era due to the fierce 1 in 47 gradient in the Blaenau direction being unsuitable for an express passenger locomotive. Because the train had to reverse at Llandudno Junction in order to attack the fierce gradients on the branch whilst running forward, the Chester to Llandudno Junction section was done with 46115 running tender first.

On 15 August 2017, 46115 hauled its last railtour before withdrawal for overhaul. It worked from Hellifield to Carlisle and return via the Settle-Carlisle line. The train was West Coast Railways' The Dalesman from Chester to Carlisle and return. 46115 took over the train from diesel traction at Hellifield and worked along the Settle-Carlisle in both directions.

The overhaul was undertaken at West Coast Railway's Carnforth, Lancashire, base. In 2018 a new inside cylinder was cast for the locomotive and 46115 returned to the main line in late July 2019 with a 'light engine' test run. A loaded test run a few days later (scheduled for 1 August 2019) was cancelled but it completed a loaded test run on 15 August 2019. On 8 September 2019 it worked from Hellifield to Carlisle in a final unannounced 'proving run' (also its first public passenger special since overhaul), when it piloted to Merchant Navy 35018 British India Line, which had brought the West Coast Railway-promoted train from York.

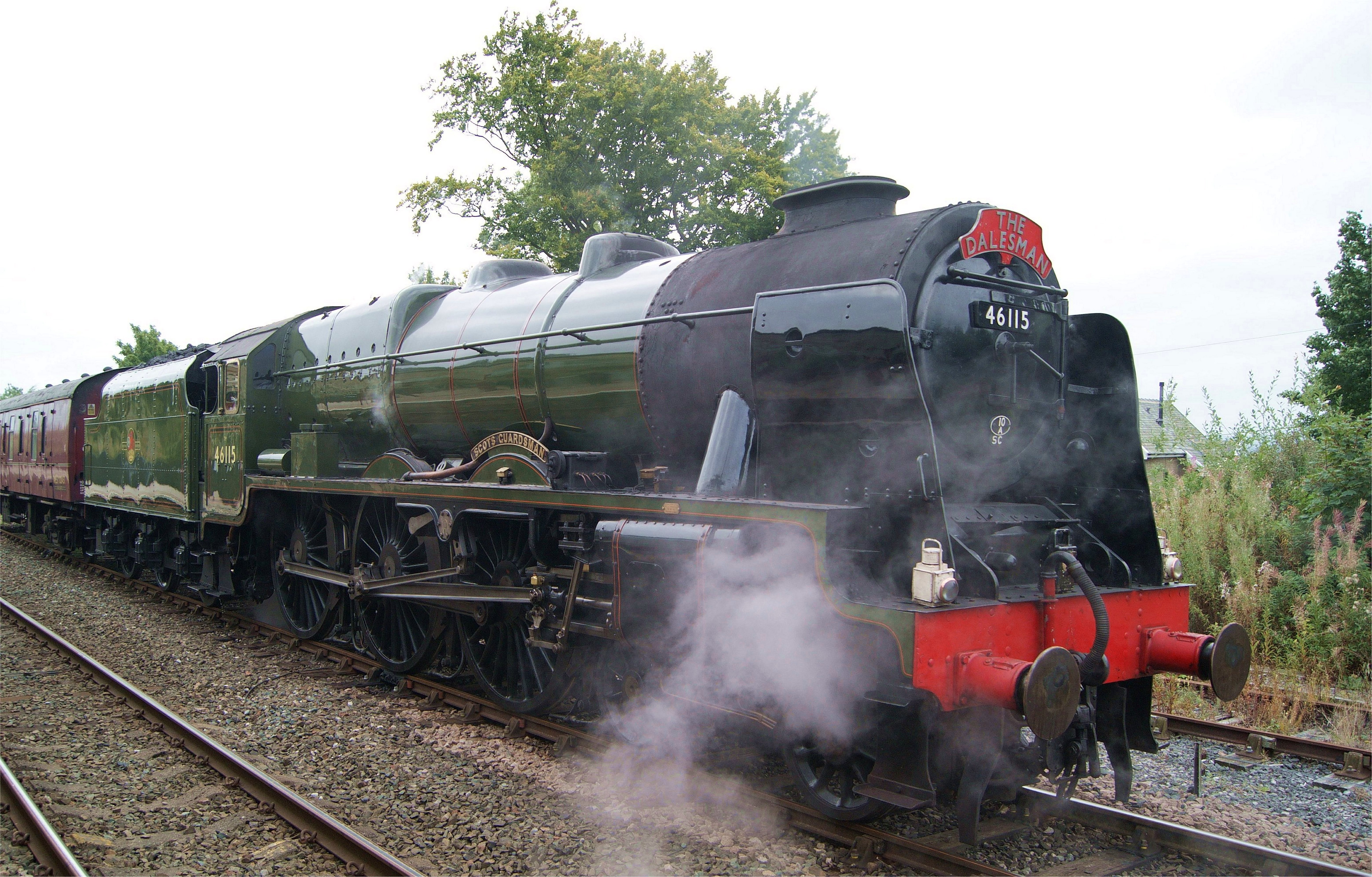
46115 Scots Guardsman, in BR green livery, at Hellifield, being prepared for the weekly "Dalesman" run on the Settle - Carlisle line.

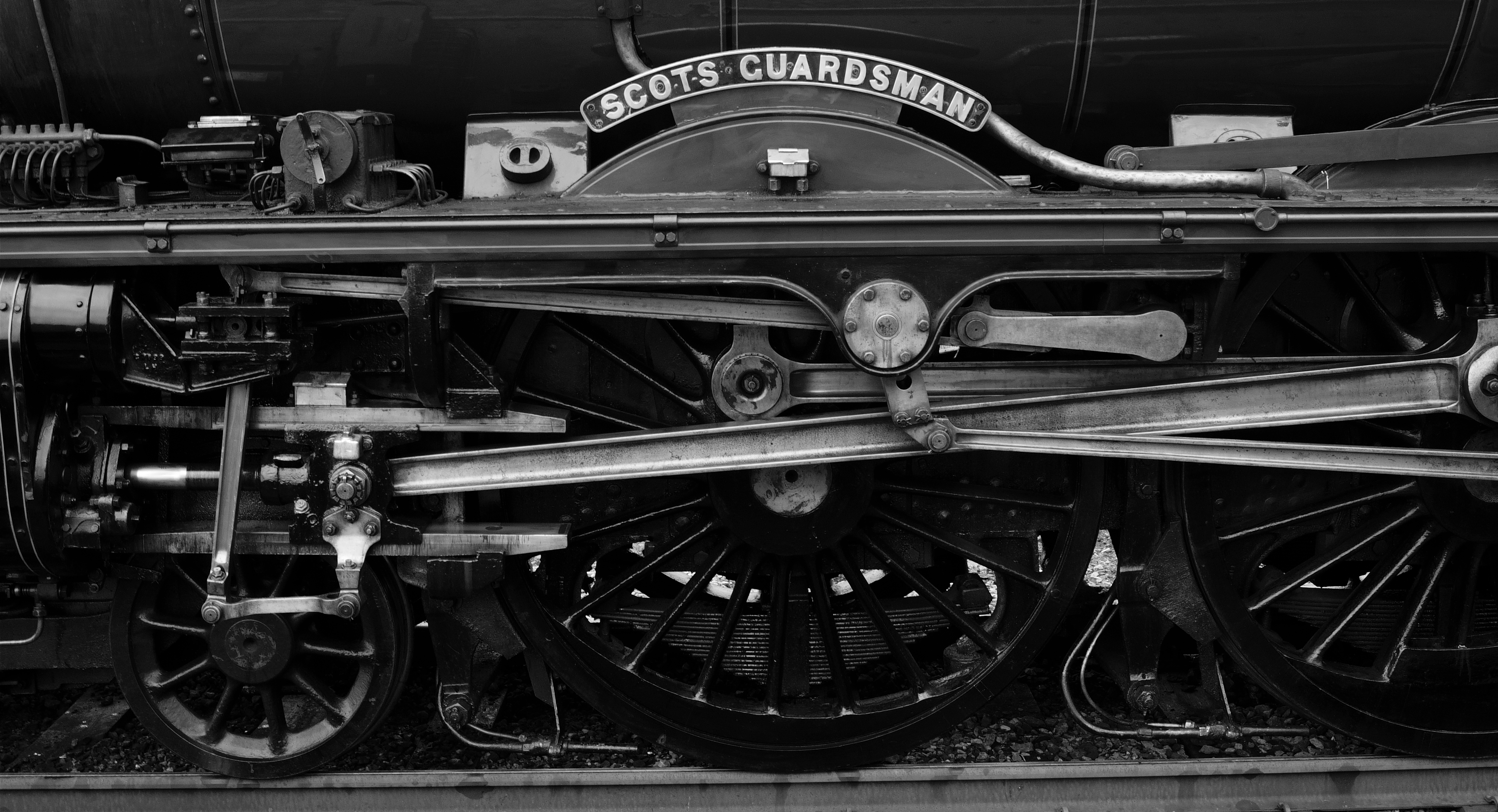
Connecting rod and valve gear

It is now in a 'pool' of steam locomotives operated by West Coast Railway that mainly haul its own trains and those of the Railway Touring Company and is normally based at Carnforth.

=== Olympic torch run ===
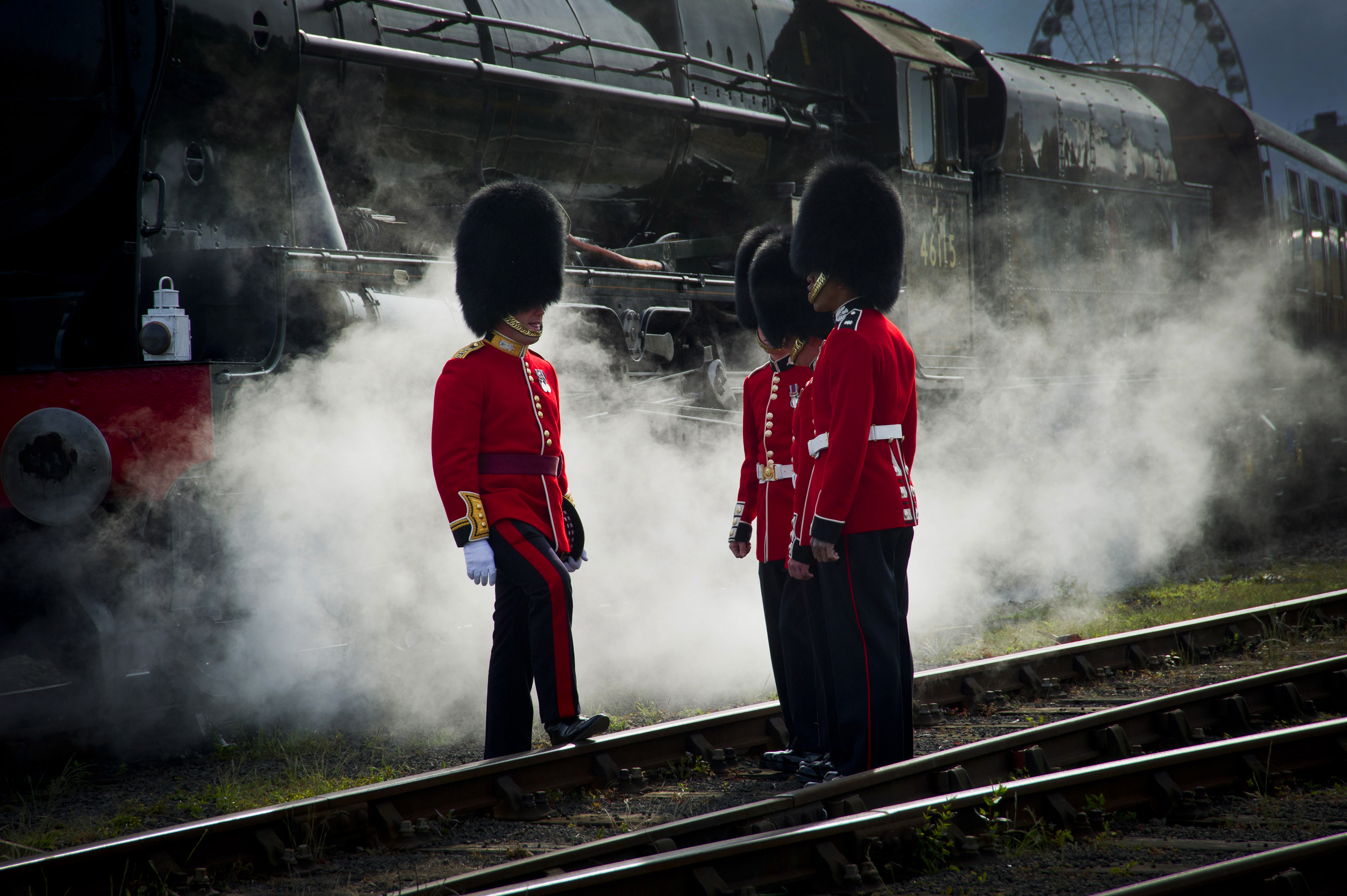
Soldiers of the Scots Guards standing beside the steam locomotive Scots Guardsman in York, before the locomotive brought the Olympic torch for the 2012 Olympic Games from York to Carlisle

On 20 June 2012, 6115 participated in the 2012 Summer Olympics torch relay taking it from York to Thirsk. It had been planned that the Olympic torch would be taken by LNER Class A3 4472 Flying Scotsman. However, due to the engine's overhaul over-running due to additional problems being found with the engine, which prevented it from taking the train, it was decided that 46115 would take her place on the Olympic torch train.

46115 took the Olympic torch train Thirsk where the Olympic torch party left the train to resume the torch's journey to Carlisle. Following this the train continued onto the National Railway Museum Shildon before being hauled by a diesel back down to Eaglescliffe and then 46115 took the train back to York. 46115 was one of five steam engines to be chosen to haul the Olympic torch on its journey around the UK. The others were 7812 Erlestoke Manor (SVR), LMS Stanier Class 8F No. 48624 (GCR), BR Standard Class 4 4-6-0 No. 75029 The Green Knight (Whitby - Grosmont, NYMR) and 60007 Sir Nigel Gresley (Grosmont - Pickering, NYMR).
