= List of BR 'Britannia' Class locomotives =

Below are the names and numbers of the steam locomotives that comprised the BR Standard Class 7, or 'Britannia' Class that ran on the British Railways network. They represented an attempt to standardise steam design for ease of maintenance and usage. Celebrating key British historical figures, the class name was based upon a suggestion by Bishop Eric Treacy.

== Fleet list ==
BR No.	Name	Builder	When built	Withdrawn	Notes
70000	Britannia	Crewe	January 1951	June 1966	Preserved. Owned by the Royal Scot Locomotive and General Trust. Operated by Locomotive Services Ltd.
70001	Lord Hurcomb	Crewe	February 1951	August 1966	
70002	Geoffrey Chaucer	Crewe	March 1951	January 1967	
70003	John Bunyan	Crewe	March 1951	March 1967	
70004	William Shakespeare	Crewe	March 1951	December 1967	Delivered 29 March 1951. Received special finish for static display at Festival of Britain exhibition at South Bank, London, from 4 May until 30 September of that year.
70005	John Milton	Crewe	April 1951	July 1967	
70006	Robert Burns	Crewe	April 1951	May 1967	
70007	Coeur-de-Lion	Crewe	April 1951	June 1965	First of the Class to be withdrawn. Taken out of service from Crewe Works on 19th June 1965 with cracked frames.
70008	Black Prince	Crewe	April 1951	January 1967	
70009	Alfred the Great	Crewe	May 1951	January 1967	
70010	Owen Glendower	Crewe	May 1951	September 1967	After its original nameplates were stolen, replacement Welsh plates reading Owain Glyndwr were fitted by December 1966.
70011	Hotspur	Crewe	May 1951	November 1967	
70012	John of Gaunt	Crewe	December 1951	December 1967	
70013	Oliver Cromwell	Crewe	May 1951	August 1968	Preserved. National Railway Museum collection. Overhauled on the Great Central Railway. Has seen mainline duty.
70014	Iron Duke	Crewe	June 1951	December 1967	
70015	Apollo	Crewe	June 1951	August 1967	
70016	Ariel	Crewe	June 1951	August 1967	
70017	Arrow	Crewe	June 1951	October 1966	Withdrawn as a result of damage incurred on 30 July 1966 in a collision with a goods train near Carlisle.
70018	Flying Dutchman	Crewe	June 1951	December 1966	
70019	Lightning	Crewe	June 1951	March 1966	
70020	Mercury	Crewe	July 1951	January 1967	
70021	Morning Star	Crewe	August 1951	December 1967	
70022	Tornado	Crewe	August 1951	December 1967	
70023	Venus	Crewe	August 1951	December 1967	
70024	Vulcan	Crewe	October 1951	December 1967	
70025	Western Star	Crewe	September 1952	December 1967	
70026	Polar Star	Crewe	October 1952	January 1967	Involved in Milton rail crash of 1955, which resulted in 11 fatalities.
70027	Rising Star	Crewe	October 1952	July 1967	
70028	Royal Star	Crewe	October 1952	September 1967	
70029	Shooting Star	Crewe	November 1952	October 1967	
70030	William Wordsworth	Crewe	November 1952	June 1966	
70031	Byron	Crewe	November 1952	November 1967	
70032	Tennyson	Crewe	December 1952	September 1967	Also carried Lord Tennyson nameplates
70033	Charles Dickens	Crewe	December 1952	July 1967	
70034	Thomas Hardy	Crewe	December 1952	May 1967	
70035	Rudyard Kipling	Crewe	December 1952	December 1967	
70036	Boadicea	Crewe	December 1952	December 1966	
70037	Hereward the Wake	Crewe	December 1952	November 1966	
70038	Robin Hood	Crewe	January 1953	August 1967	
70039	Sir Christopher Wren	Crewe	February 1953	September 1967	
70040	Clive of India	Crewe	March 1953	April 1967	
70041	Sir John Moore	Crewe	March 1953	April 1967	
70042	Lord Roberts	Crewe	April 1953	March 1967	
70043	Lord Kitchener	Crewe	June 1953	August 1965	Initially equipped with air brakes, and the compressors fitted in place of the smoke deflectors.
70044	Earl Haig	Crewe	June 1953	October 1966	
70045	Lord Rowallan	Crewe	June 1954	December 1967	
70046	Anzac	Crewe	June 1954	July 1967	
70047	—	Crewe	June 1954	July 1967	Never named
70048	The Territorial Army 1908–1958	Crewe	July 1954	May 1967	Aluminium nameplate
70049	Solway Firth	Crewe	July 1954	December 1967	
70050	Firth of Clyde	Crewe	August 1954	August 1966	
70051	Firth of Forth	Crewe	August 1954	December 1967	
70052	Firth of Tay	Crewe	August 1954	April 1967	Involved in Settle rail crash of 1960, which resulted in 5 fatalities
70053	Moray Firth	Crewe	September 1954	April 1967	
70054	Dornoch Firth	Crewe	September 1954	November 1966	

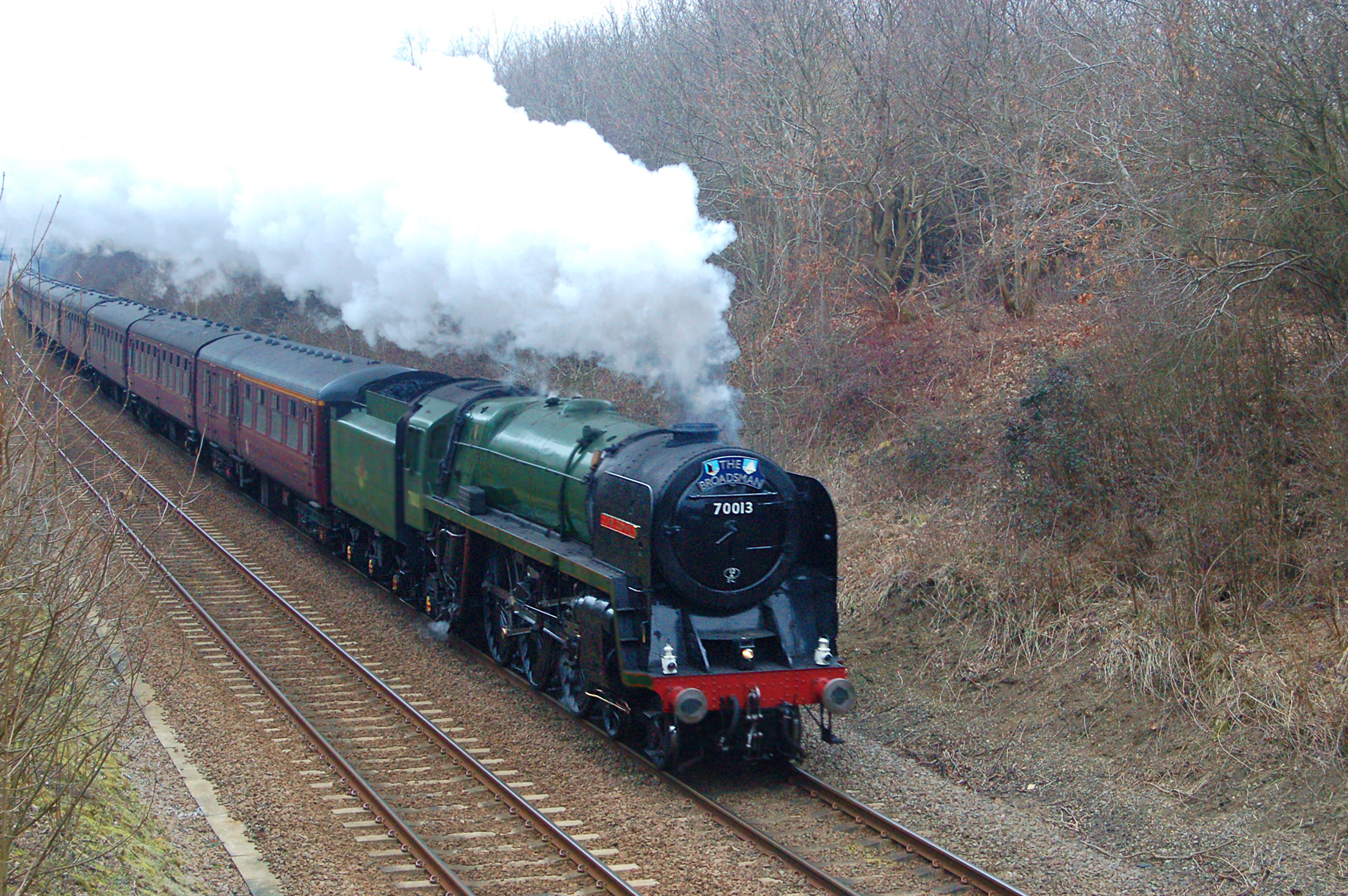
Preserved 7MT 70013 Oliver Cromwell on the Ely-Norwich line near Hethersett on 11 March 2010.
