= Class 7 =

Class 7 may refer to:

- Baltimore and Ohio P-7
- British Rail Class 07
- BR Standard Class 7
- BR Standard Class 7 70000 Britannia
- BR Standard Class 7 70048 The Territorial Army 1908–1958
- GWR 7 Class
- GWR 7 (Armstrong) Class
- Ha-7-class submarine
- HAZMAT Class 7 Radioactive substances
- I-7-class submarine
- Indian locomotive class WAG-7
- Indian locomotive class WAP-7
- Indian locomotive class WDM-7
- L&YR Class 7
- LMS Class 7F 0-8-0
- LSWR M7 class
- LSWR T7 class
- MGWR Class 7
- Milwaukee Road class F7
- NSB Class 7, a standard-gauge steam locomotive of Norway
- NSB Class VII, a narrow-gauge steam locomotive of Norway
- Class VII (U.S. Army), Major items: A final combination of end products which is ready for its intended use: (principal item) for example, launchers, tanks, mobile machine shops, vehicles
- NSB El 7, an electric locomotive of Norway
- NSB Di 7, a diesel locomotive of Norway
- Southern Pacific class AC-7
- Surface of class VII, non-algebraic complex surface
- TS Class 7, a tram of Trondheim, Norway
- Class 7 truck, a US truck class for heavy trucks up to 33,000 pounds weight limit
- TS Class 7
- U-7 class submarine (Austria-Hungary)
- VR Class Dm7
- W-7-class minesweeper
