= Seventh grade =

Educational year

Seventh grade (also 7th grade or Grade 7) is the seventh year of formal or compulsory education. The seventh grade is typically the first or second year of middle school. In the United States, kids in seventh grade are usually around 12–13 years old. It is the eighth school year since kindergarten. Different terms and numbers are used in other parts of the world.

== Brazil ==
In Brazil, grade 7 (7º Ano or 7ª Série) is the second year of middle school. It is the sétimo ano do Ensino Fundamental II.

== Canada ==
In Canada, the equivalent is Grade 7. In the province of Quebec, Grade 7 is the first year of secondary school or Secondaire 1.

== Finland ==
In Finland, 7th grade is the first year of lower secondary education or yläaste. Students in this grade are generally age 12 - 14. Starting this year, the elementary school subject formerly known as "science" is broken down into their own separate subjects: biology, chemistry, physics, and geography, as well as health education. Another subject called home economics is also introduced, though it usually only lasts for this school year unless taken as an elective. Other subjects taken in this year are: mathematics, Finnish, English, Swedish, history, religious education/ethics, music, arts, crafts and physical education.

Before winter break, students choose 1 or 2 long electives to last them through 8th and 9th grade, and 2 short ones to last them through 8th grade. Short electives do not get graded as each of them last only half of the school year, while long electives do get a formal grade as they last through the rest of lower secondary.

== India ==
In India, the equivalent of seventh grade is generally known as Class 7 or Grade 7. Students are typically around 12–13 years old and study subjects including mathematics, science, social science, and languages. Under the National Education Policy 2020, Classes 6 to 8 form the middle stage of school education.

== United States ==
In the United States, in mathematics, 7th grade students go more into pre-algebra or the beginnings of algebra, including ratios, proportions, and percentages. New topics sometimes include scientific notation, concepts with negative numbers or integers, and more advanced geometry. Some schools allow advanced students to take an Algebra I course instead of following the standard 7th grade math curriculum.

In social studies, advanced pre-Civil War History is taught. Though American history is usually the most common, other cultures and time periods may be taught, including state and capital history (in, for example, Texas and South Carolina), European history (in Connecticut), World History, (in New Jersey), and Civics (in Florida).

See also

- Educational stage
- Curriculum

Preceded by Sixth grade	Seventh grade age 12–13	Succeeded by Eighth grade
