= BR Standard Class 7 =

Class of 55 two-cylinder 4-6-2 locomotives

British Railways Standard Class 7 Britannia Class
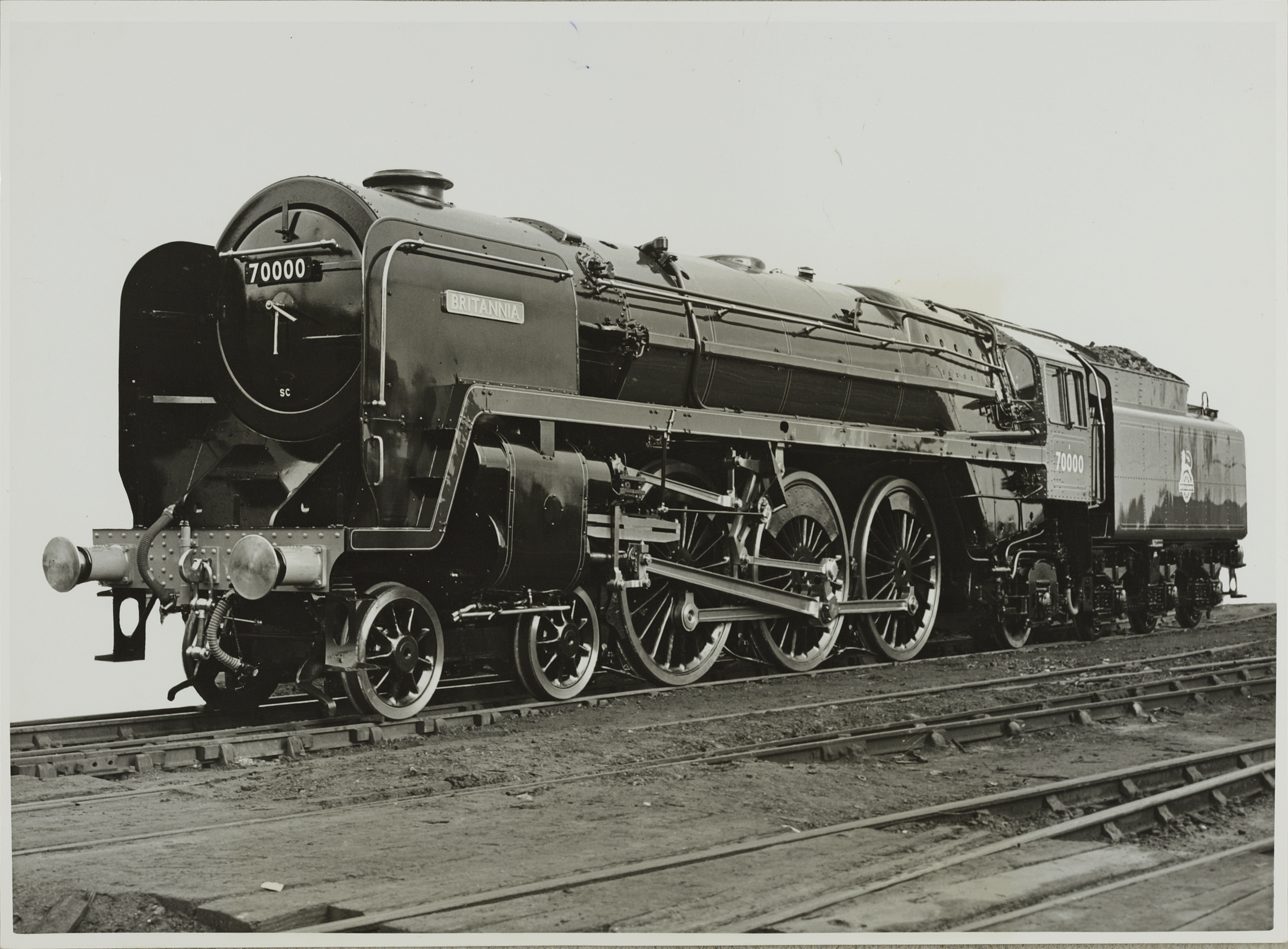
- No. 70000 "Britannia" in January 1951
Type and origin
- Power type: Steam
- Designer: Robert Riddles
- Builder: BR Crewe Works
- Build date: January 1951 – September 1954
- Total produced: 55
Specifications
- Configuration
  - Whyte: 4-6-2
  - UIC: 2′C1′h2
- Gauge: 4 ft 8 1/2 in (1,435 mm) standard gauge
- Leading dia.: 3 ft 0 in (0.914 m)
- Driver dia.: 6 ft 2 in (1.880 m)
- Trailing dia.: 3 ft 3 1/2 in (1.003 m)
- Length: 68 ft 9 in (20.96 m)
- Width: 8 ft 8 3/4 in (2.66 m)
- Height: 13 ft 0 1/2 in (3.98 m)7004
- Axle load: 20.5 long tons (20.8 t; 23.0 short tons)
- Adhesive weight: 61.5 long tons (62.5 t; 68.9 short tons)
- Loco weight: 94 long tons (96 t; 105 short tons)
- Tender weight: BR1: 49.15 long tons (49.94 t; 55.05 short tons); BR1A: 52.5 long tons (53.3 t; 58.8 short tons); BR1D: 54.5 long tons (55.4 t; 61.0 short tons)
- Tender type: BR1 (40), BR1A (5), or BR1D (10)
- Fuel type: Coal
- Fuel capacity: BR1/BR1A: 7.0 long tons (7.1 t; 7.8 short tons); BR1D: 9.0 long tons (9.1 t; 10.1 short tons)
- Water cap.: BR1 4,250 imp gal (19,300 L; 5,100 US gal); BR1A: 5,000 imp gal (23,000 L; 6,000 US gal); BR1D: 4,750 imp gal (21,600 L; 5,700 US gal)
- Firebox
  - Grate area: 42 sq ft (3.9 m^{2})
- Boiler: BR1
- Boiler pressure: 250 psi (1.72 MPa)
- Heating surface
  - Firebox: 210 sq ft (20 m^{2})
  - Tubes and flues: 2,264 sq ft (210.3 m^{2})
- Superheater
  - Heating area: 718 sq ft (66.7 m^{2})
- Cylinders: Two, outside
- Cylinder size: 20 in × 28 in (508 mm × 711 mm)
Performance figures
- Tractive effort: 32,150 lbf (143.0 kN)
- Factor of adh.: 4.23
Career
- Operators: British Railways
- Power class: 7MT
- Numbers: 70000–70054
- Nicknames: Brits
- Axle load class: Route availability 8 BR (WR): Red
- Locale: Eastern Region, London Midland Region, Scottish Region, Southern Region, Western Region
- Withdrawn: June 1965 – August 1968
- Disposition: Two preserved, remainder scrapped

The BR Standard Class 7, otherwise known as the Britannia Class, is a class of 4-6-2 "Pacific" type steam locomotive designed under Robert Riddles for use by British Railways for mixed-traffic duties. 55 were constructed between 1951 and 1954. The design employed results from the 1948 locomotive exchange trials undertaken in advance of further locomotive classes being constructed. Three batches were constructed at Crewe Works, before the publication of the 1955 Modernisation Plan.

The Britannia Class design was based on best practice from the pre-nationalisation railway companies in terms of operating efficiency and lower maintenance costs; various weight-saving measures also increased the route availability of a Pacific-type locomotive on the British Railways network. The Britannias received a positive reception from their crews, with those regularly operating the locomotives giving them favourable reports as regards performance. However, operation in some areas of the British Railway network returned negative feedback, primarily due to indifferent operation of the locomotive, with its effects on adhering to timetables. They were capable of reaching speeds of up to 90 mph (145 km/h).

The Britannias took their names from great Britons, former Star class locomotives, and Scottish firths. The class remained in service until the last was withdrawn in 1968. Two survived into preservation, the first-of-class, number 70000 Britannia, and 70013 Oliver Cromwell. Number 70000 has hauled mainline excursions and 70013, after a period of display following limited steaming, returned to mainline steam in 2008 for the first time since leaving British Railways ownership. 70000 was returned to the main line in 2011.

== Background ==
Locomotive exchanges were commissioned by the fledgling British Railways (BR) during 1948, to compare pre-nationalisation locomotive design across the Big Four railway companies. The research gained from operating the best designs of the GWR, LMS, LNER and Southern railways on different areas of the British Railways network paved the way for several new classes of standardised locomotives intended to replace some of the ageing designs inherited.

The new classes were designed by E. S. Cox, under Robert Riddles who had previously designed the WD Austerity 2-8-0 and WD Austerity 2-10-0 locomotives for wartime use. The first design requested by the Railway Executive was for a new express passenger "Pacific" locomotive, designed specifically to reduce maintenance and using the latest available innovations in steam technology from home and abroad. Various labour-saving devices were utilised to produce a simple, standard and effective design, able to produce equivalent power to some of the "Pacifics" that were still available as legacies of the Big Four.

== Design features ==
The design of the "Britannias" was based on best practice from the pre-nationalisation railway companies. For example, they utilised a variation of both boiler and trailing truck of the Merchant Navy class, while weight was kept within the margins laid down by the Light Pacifics, all of which were designed by Oliver Bulleid. The firebox was also similar in having a rocking grate, which allowed the fire to be rebuilt without stopping the locomotive, removing both ash and clinker on the move; but unlike the SR Pacifics, the inner firebox was constructed of copper instead of steel and lacked thermic syphons.

The "Britannias" had 6 ft 2 in (1.88 m) driving wheels, a compromise for their mixed-traffic role to allow sustained fast running with passenger trains, yet small enough to give sufficient tractive effort for freight haulage.

The largest, only outside, cylinders capable of giving maximum tractive effort whilst staying within the British loading gauge were used for ease of maintenance compared with "inside" cylinders located between the frames of a three- or four-cylindered locomotive. Boiler 'plumbing' was also generally exposed to give ease of access. For ease of maintenance, outside Walschaerts valve gear was used.

A self-cleaning smokebox enabled ash to be ejected through the chimney, reducing the workload of the engine cleaner at the end of a working day. The single chimney was unusual for a "Pacific" type of locomotive, but was chosen because the exhaust dimensions including the blastpipe were designed using work done at the Rugby test plant and by S.O. Ell at Swindon Works, who claimed that "better results could be obtained from a well-designed single chimney than some of the previous double chimney arrangements".

The design also featured raised running plates above the wheels, which allowed easy access to the inside of the frames for purposes of lubrication.

The "Britannias'" footplate was designed around the requirements of the operating crews, with a mock-up being constructed at Crewe to test ergonomics and usability.

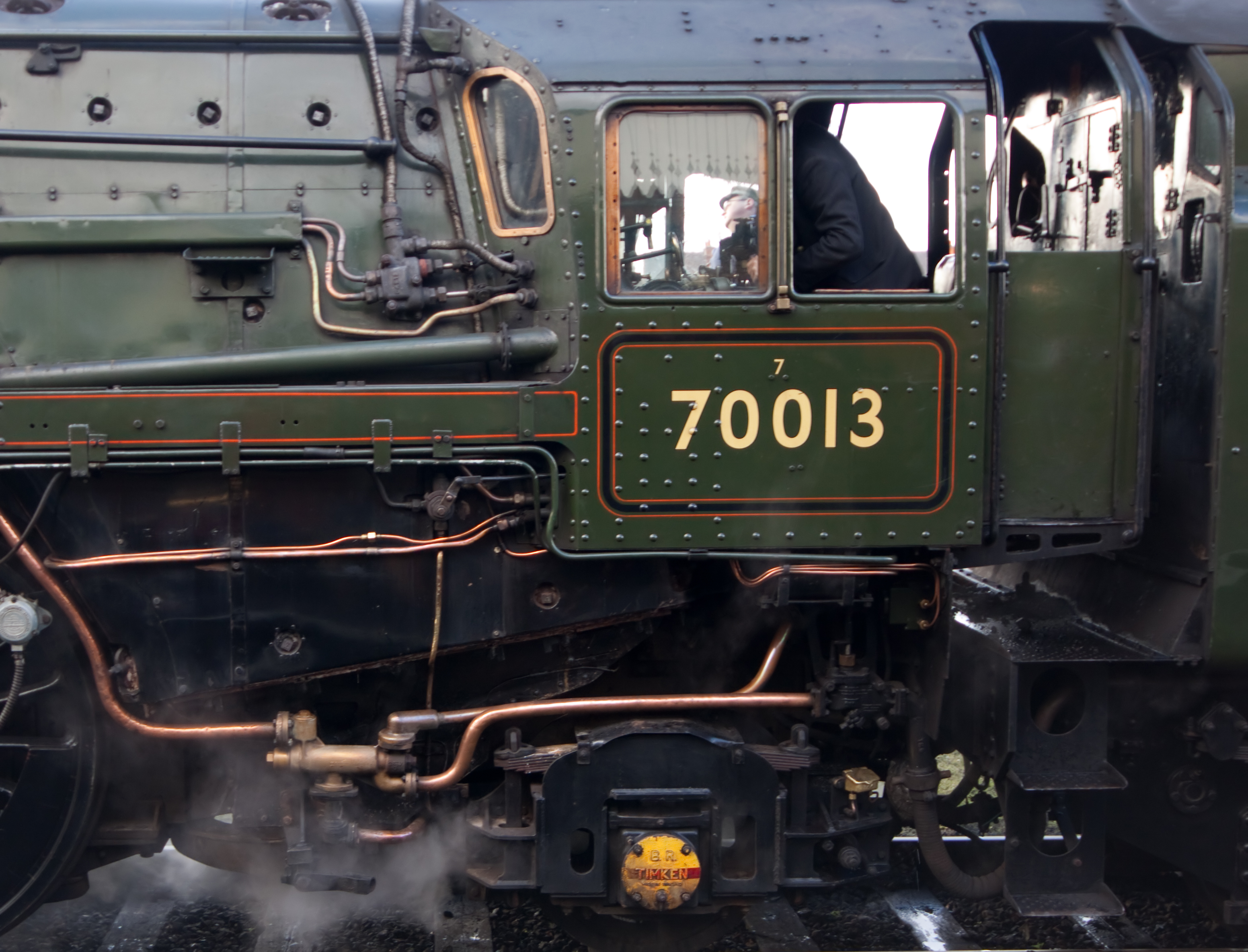
Live steam injector on no. 70013. The four pipe connections are (clockwise from top left): feed to boiler; steam inlet; water inlet; overflow.
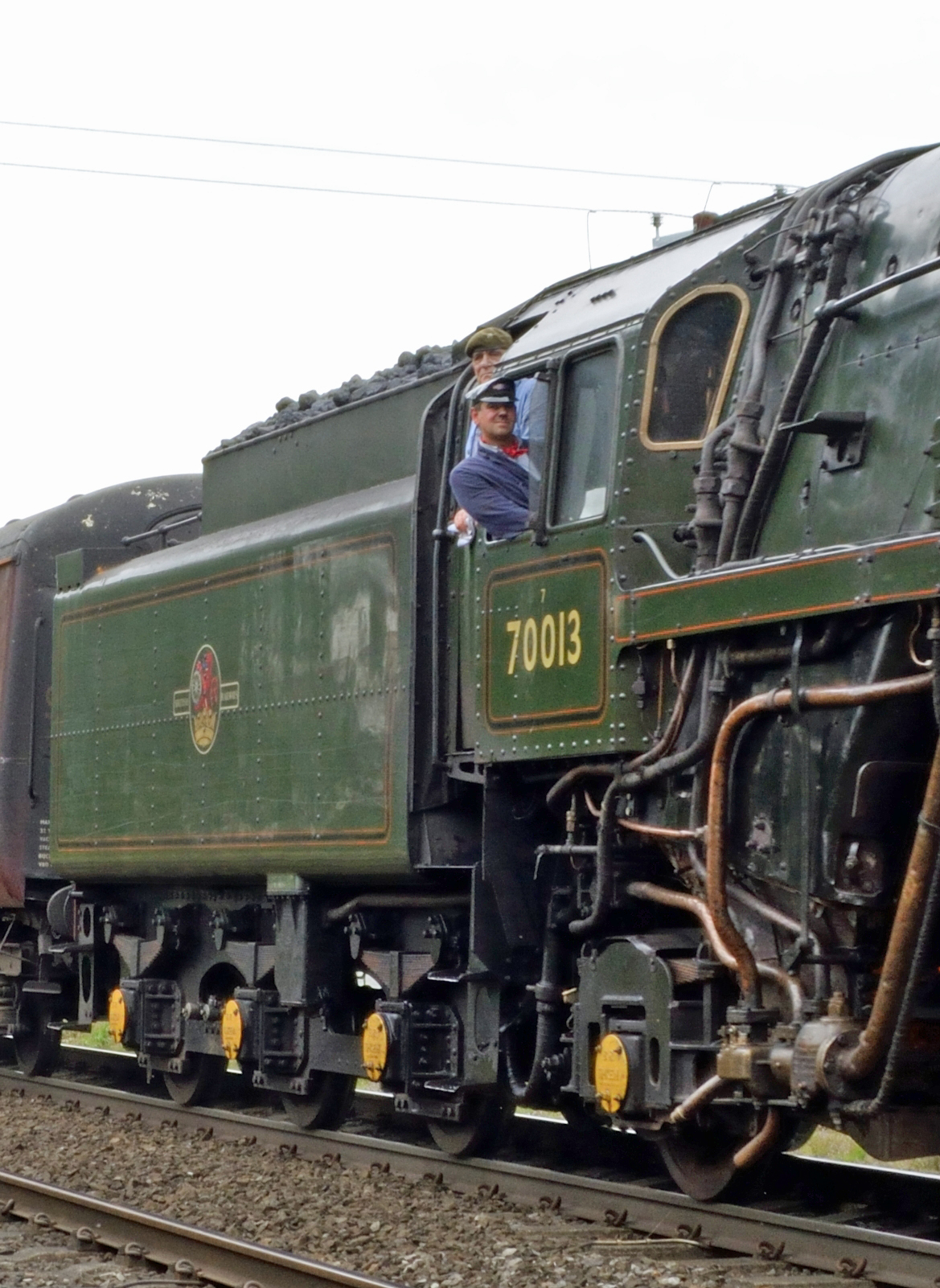
Exhaust steam injector on no. 70013. The four pipe connections are (clockwise from left): exhaust steam inlet; water inlet; feed to boiler; overflow.

Two injectors were fitted, one on each side of the boiler, securely fixed to the firebox foundation ring to eliminate problems previously experienced with fractured pipework on frame-mounted injectors. The injector on the left of the firebox was a GWR-type live steam injector, that on the right was an 11 mm Davies and Metcalfe exhaust steam injector. These injectors fed the boiler through clack valves of SR design. Unlike the smaller BR Standard locos the exhaust steam manifold within the smokebox saddle (along with the BR Standard Class 6 engines) was an intricate steel casting.

== Construction history ==
Designed at British Railways' Derby Works, the new class was constructed at British Railways' Crewe Works between 1951 and 1954. The initial order was for 25 locomotives, but such was the demand for the Britannias on the Eastern Region that more were rushed through construction before the teething problems had been ironed out on the prototypes. In total, 55 members of the class were constructed over three batches at Crewe Works, where each was given improvements to improve reliability and efficiency, and to overcome flaws with the original design.

- First batch: 70000–70024, constructed between January and October 1951
- Second batch: 70025–70044, constructed between September 1952 and October 1953
- Third batch: 70045–70054, constructed in 1954.

=== Variations and modifications ===
Problems with the class were experienced immediately, with the first 25 locomotives being withdrawn in October 1951 after several complaints were received from crews regarding the driving wheels shifting on their axles. They were subsequently modified, and released back into revenue-earning service. Initially the return cranks on the main driving wheels were of LNER block type, as seen on Arthur Peppercorn's A1s and A2s, but this was changed to the simpler LMS four-stud fitting. This was the result of a problem of overheating bearings within the cranks, and difficulty in removing the LNER-type casings. 70035–70039 were built with roller bearings on the leading and trailing coupled axles only and plain bearings on the remaining axles, whilst 70040–70049 were built with plain bearings throughout. However throughout their service the roller bearings used in remaining cases showed no advantage in reliability or cost.

An unusual fault with the first engines of the class was fore-and-aft vibration, strong enough to prompt passengers to complain and to cause fire-irons stowed in a longitudinal compartment on top of the tender to work their way forward into the cab. The passengers' complaints were dealt with by reducing the tension in the drawbar spring.

Locomotive tenders were also changed as new, improved designs became available. Some examples of the second batch (70025–70029) were equipped with the BR1A tender, which had a higher water capacity of 5,000 gallons. Members of the third batch (70045–70054) were equipped with another tender design, the BR1D, which had 9 tons of coal and 4,750 gallons of water, due to the fact that they were intended for use on longer runs in the north of the railway network. This tender design also featured a steam-powered coal pusher, which eliminated the need for crew members to mount the tender to pull forward coal when the locomotive was at a stop.

Nos.70043 and 70044 were delivered with Westinghouse airbrakes fitted alongside the smokebox and with no smoke deflectors. The two locomotives, which looked radically different from the rest of the class, were allocated to Manchester (Longsight) and ran a series of brake trials on the London Midland main line during the mid-1950s. Subsequently, both had the equipment removed and deflectors fitted.

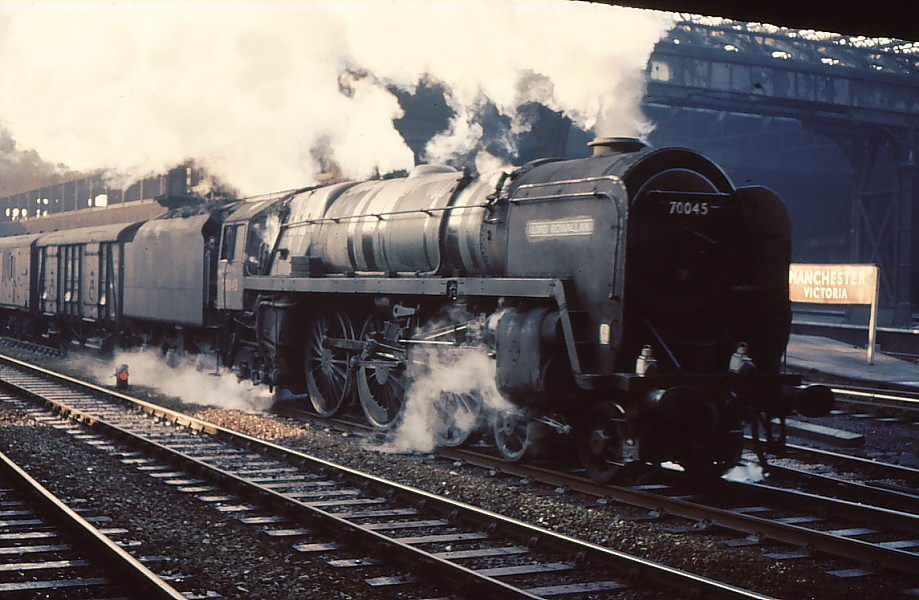
70045 Lord Rowallan with LMS-style buffers.

No. 70045 was fitted with LMS-style oval buffers in the course of repairs after collision damage.

On 21 January 1960, the Settle rail crash, which cost the lives of five passengers, was caused when the piston rod, cross-head and connecting rod of No. 70052 came loose and damaged the opposite line as a freight train was approaching. The locomotive of the freight train was derailed towards 70052's train and tore out the sides of three passenger coaches. Part of the slide assembly was redesigned, and was fitted as the locomotives were routinely "shopped".

Western Region based examples had hand/foot holds cut into the smoke deflectors replacing the original handrails after a major derailment, to improve forward visibility. Some of these deflectors subsequently migrated to other members of the class.

=== Naming ===
From 1948 until the mid-1950s, the responsibility for recommending names for locomotives on British Railways rested with a Locomotive Naming Committee of three senior railway officers, E. S. Cox, George Dow with Derek Barrie as chairman.

The Committee set itself several rules and over the years developed many practices. The names had to be euphonious (they had to have a pleasant sound). Also, their meaning had to be readily apparent to anyone interested, whether railwayman or member of the public. There had to be good publicity value in the names as well as providing good morale for the staff, and the collection of names for a class had to provide some form of class identity. Another rule was not to use names of people who were still alive at the time, and some on the committee had a strong dislike of names or associations with the military (largely because they were fed-up with the recently ended war). There was a preference for names of heroes and other well-known people. However, slavishly following a single theme to an absurd extent was discouraged.

The name that was to be bestowed on the first class member caused great debate on the committee and the wider executive of British Railways. However noted enthusiast Bishop Eric Treacy suggested the name "Britannia". This set the general theme of the naming process, which featured great Britons, although several deviations from the theme were allowed. These exceptions were allocated to those that operated on the Western Region, which were given names of former Star Class locomotives, and those of the Scottish Region, which were granted the names of the various Scottish firths. The locomotive naming ceremonies were carried out at various railway stations around the British Railways network. No. 70047 was never named.

== Operational details ==
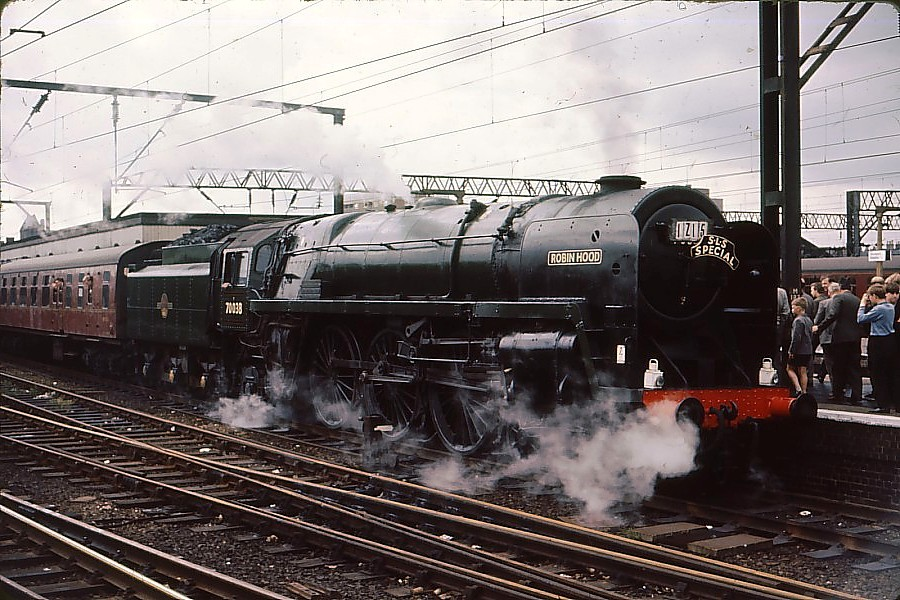
70038 'Robin Hood' at Stockport station in July 1967.

The class was well liked by crews in most regions of British Railways, with especially glowing reports from those operating them from Stratford depot on the Eastern Region, where its lower weight and high power transformed motive power over the restricted East Anglian lines. However, negative feedback was received from various operating departments, most notably on the Western Region. The criticism was primarily out of partisan preference for GWR-designed locomotive stock among Western Region staff; in particular, the class was 'left-hand drive' in contrast to 'right-hand drive' GWR locomotive and signalling practice, a factor in the Milton rail crash of 1955.

For this reason, the Western Region locomotive depots at Old Oak Common TMD and Plymouth Laira declared that the class was surplus to requirements. However Cardiff Canton depot displayed its liking for the class (despite being part of the former GWR empire) and managed to obtain good results on South Wales passenger traffic.

The London Midland Region also had favourable reports, but a marked consistency in losing time on the longer runs between Holyhead and Euston was recorded, although all complaints were down to the individual techniques of the operating crews. This was compounded by the irregular allocation of the class to depots all over the network, meaning that few crews ever had a great deal of experience in driving them. The Southern Region also had an allocation of seven in May 1953, when all Merchant Navy Class locomotives were temporarily withdrawn for inspection after 35020 "Bibby Line" sheared a crank axle on the central driving wheel.

Repairs to the class were undertaken at Crewe, Swindon and Doncaster Works until the financial constraints of the British Railways Modernisation Plan in terms of expenditure on steam began to preclude the regular overhaul of locomotives. During the mid-1960s overhauls were carried out exclusively at Crewe Works. The first locomotive to be withdrawn from service was number 70007 "Coeur-de-Lion" in 1965, and the entire class was gradually transferred to Carlisle Kingmoor and Glasgow Polmadie depots as steam was displaced by the dieselisation of British Railways. Some members of this class were a common sight in the Cumbrian main line, pulling both passenger trains and parcel trains in Grange-over-Sands, Barrow-in-Furness, Preston, and other locations in the area. A succession of bulk withdrawals began in 1967, and the last, of number 70013 "Oliver Cromwell", took place in 1968, at the very end of steam operation in Britain. Subsequently, that locomotive was selected to represent the class in the National Collection. Only 70000 "Britannia", which was privately preserved, saw main line service during the preservation era – until 2008, when 70013 "Oliver Cromwell"'s restoration was completed, and she worked part of the "15 Guinea Special" – a special train run to commemorate the final BR steam working in 1968. 70013 is now to be found operating main line railtours over the Network Rail system.

Table of withdrawals
Year	Quantity in service at start of year	Quantity withdrawn	Locomotive numbers	Notes
1965	55	2	70007/43	
1966	53	12	70000–01/17–19/30/36–37/50/52–54	70000 preserved
1967	41	40	70002–06/08–12/14–16/20–29/31–35/38–42/44–49/51	
1968	1	1	70013	Hauled the Fifteen Guinea Special, later preserved

== Accidents and incidents ==
- On 20 November 1955, locomotive No. 70026 Polar Star was hauling an excursion train that was derailed at Milton, Oxfordshire due to excessive speed through a crossover. Eleven people were killed and 157 were injured.
- On 21 January 1960, locomotive No. 70052 Firth of Tay was hauling an express passenger train that was derailed at Settle, Yorkshire due to a defect on the locomotive. Five people were killed and nine were injured.
- On 5 June 1965, locomotive 70051 Firth of Forth was hauling a passenger train when a blowback of the fire occurred near Winsford. Driver Wally Oakes managed to safely bring the train to a stand, but both he and fireman Gwilym Roberts were severely injured. Oakes died a week later. He was awarded the George Cross and the Carnegie Hero Trust bronze medal for his actions. Class 86 locomotive 86 260 was later named Wallace Oakes G.C. in his honour.
- On 30 July 1966, locomotive No. 70017 Arrow was hauling a set of empty coaches from Carlisle Citadel when it was derailed at Carlisle St Nicholas after a rear-end collision with a goods train on the Carlisle Joint Goods Line. The locomotive would later be withdrawn from service owing to the damage received in the accident and derailment.
- On 27 May 2012, locomotive No. 70013 Oliver Cromwell was involved in a blowback incident at Wood Green tunnel near New Southgate station in North London on a Railway Touring Company railtour called 'The Peak Forester'. Two of the three crew on board the locomotive had to attend hospital as a result. A Rail Accident Investigation Branch investigation was conducted after the accident.
- On 22 August 2023, locomotive No. 70000 Britannia while hauling a Steam Dreams circular tour around the Surrey Hills suffered a catastrophic failure of its right side crosshead just after passing through Chilworth. Following an inspection by the engines support crew it was discovered that the crosshead had snapped in two and the piston had disconnected then damaged the front cylinder cover. Under cover of darkness with a blockade in place the right side connecting rod had to be removed and then 70000 was towed behind a diesel and its train back to London Victoria via Guildford.

== Livery and numbering ==
The first member of the class was given a livery of plain black without lining; this was changed to the new standard British Railways Dark Locomotive Green that was applied to express passenger locomotives after nationalisation, despite the locomotive being classed as mixed traffic. This was lined in orange and black, and the class was given the power classification 7MT. The "Britannias" were numbered under the new British Railways standard numbering system in the 70xxx series. The locomotives were numbered between 70000 and 70054, and featured brass nameplates with an initial black background, followed by red, located on the smoke deflectors. Towards the end of steam plain green livery was substituted, with the touching-up of existing paintwork being preferred to full aesthetic overhaul.

== Preservation ==
Two Britannias have survived: the prototype engine number 70000 Britannia, and 70013 Oliver Cromwell. Both engines have also operated at certain points in preservation as well as both running on the main line in preservation.

Number	Name	Built	Withdrawn	Base	Owner	Status	Mainline Certified	Livery	Tender	Photo	Notes
70000	Britannia	Jan 1951	May 1966	Crewe Diesel TMD	Royal Scot Locomotive and General Trust	Operational, Boiler ticket expires: 2032	Yes (2022 - ongoing)	BR Green, Late Crest	BR1A		Recently returned to traffic from overhaul. Withdrawn from traffic in August 2023 for repairs following the failure of its right side crosshead while working a railtour in August 2023. Returned to service in March 2024 following completion of repairs.
70013	Oliver Cromwell	May 1951	Aug 1968	Great Central Railway	National Railway Museum, cared for by 5305 Locomotive Association.	Under Overhaul, Boiler ticket expired: 31 December 2018	No (to be certified)	BR Green, Late Crest	BR1A		Overhaul anticipated for completion in 2024.

Number 70000 was originally selected to represent the class in the embryonic form of the future National Railway Museum, but was ultimately rejected due to the locomotive's poor mechanical condition. As a result, 70013 was eventually selected to represent the class for the benefit of future generations. However, 70000 had been purchased privately from British Railways by the Britannia Locomotive Group, which ensured that the doyen of the class was to survive into the preservation era. Subsequently, utilised on mainline railtours, the locomotive was out of use in the late 1990s, requiring work to bring it back to steam; it was eventually sold to Pete Waterman and stored at Crewe. After a spell in storage on the Bressingham Steam Museum in Diss, Norfolk, 70013 was moved to the Great Central Railway (preserved), following an ownership dispute between Bressingham and the National Railway Museum. The locomotive returned to steam in May 2008 on the Great Central Railway after the readers of Steam Railway magazine contributed towards its overhaul. In July 2008 it appeared in WCRC's Open Weekend at Steamtown, Carnforth. August saw the locomotive return to the main line. Its first turn was the 1T57 'Fifteen Guinea Special' re-run from Manchester to Carlisle, 40 years after it performed the same duty in 1968. As a result, both preserved members of the class have operated on the mainline in preservation.

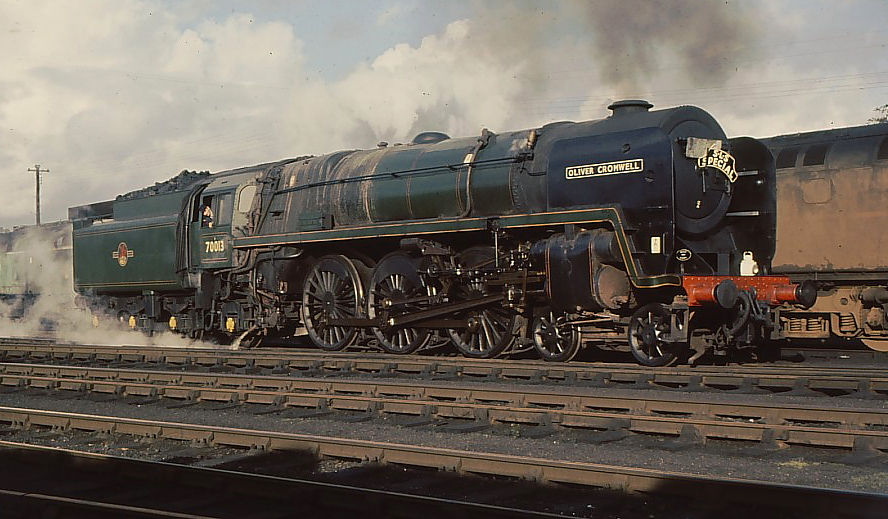
Standard Class 7 Oliver Cromwell at Carlisle Kingmoor in 1968.

After its sale to the Royal Scot Locomotive and General Trust, 70000 was overhauled at Crewe and returned to the main line in 2011 (its 60th anniversary), initially in unlined black without name plates as originally outshopped in 1951 (the plates were first fitted for the Festival of Britain later that year).

== See also ==
- List of BR 'Britannia' Class locomotives
- BR Standard Class 7 70000 Britannia
- BR Standard Class 7 70013 Oliver Cromwell
