= Combat Estimate =

Combat estimate for military engagements

The Combat Estimate, also known as the Seven Questions, is a sequence of questions used by military commanders, usually in contact with the enemy, to plan their response, such as a platoon attack. It provides a means for formulating a plan that meets the exigencies of battle, even in very difficult circumstances. However, it may also be used at all levels in the chain of command, from tactical to strategic.

The Combat Estimate was introduced by the British Army in 2001, although the military estimate or appreciation process is used widely by militaries around the world. It was developed to simplify and speedup the planning process at Battlegroup (BG) level. The approach focuses all of the work strands carried out during planning and ensures that these works have purpose. Its effectiveness has led to variants of it being used as a tool for decision making in a variety of contexts, from surgery to management consulting. An example is its application in identifying the process of plan development, the initial research stage for SMEs.

== The questions ==
The Combat Estimate consists of seven questions as follows:

1. What is the situation and how does it affect me?
2. What have I been told to do and why?
3. What effects do I need to achieve and what direction must I give to develop my plan?
4. Where can I best accomplish each action or effect?
5. What resources do I need to accomplish each action or effect?
6. When and where do these actions take place in relation to each other?
7. What control measures do I need to impose?

== See also ==
- Military strategy
- Battle drill
