= Army Reserve (United Kingdom) =

Element of the British Army

- Active: 1908–present
- Allegiance: United Kingdom
- Branch: British Army
- Role: Volunteer Reserve
- Website: Army Reserve

Commanders
- Chief of the General Staff: General Sir Roland Walker
- Director Reserves: Major General The Lord Lancaster of Kimbolton

Insignia
- War flag

- Non-ceremonial flag
- Units: List of current Army Reserve units of the British Army

The Army Reserve is the volunteer reserve force of the British Army. It is separate from the Regular Reserve whose members are ex-regular personnel who retain a statutory liability for service. Descended from the Territorial Force (1908 to 1921), the Army Reserve was known as the Territorial Army (TA) from 1921 to 1967 and again from 1979 to 2014, and the Territorial and Army Volunteer Reserve (TAVR) from 1967 to 1979.

The force was created in 1908 by the Secretary of State for War, Richard Haldane, when the Territorial and Reserve Forces Act 1907 combined the previously civilian-administered Volunteer Force, with the mounted Yeomanry (at the same time the Militia was renamed the Special Reserve).

Haldane planned a volunteer "Territorial Force", to provide a second line for the six divisions of the Expeditionary Force which he was establishing as the centerpiece of the Regular Army. The Territorial Force was to be composed of fourteen divisions of infantry and fourteen brigades of cavalry, together with all the supporting arms and services needed for overseas war, including artillery, engineers, commissariat and medical support. The new Special Reserve was to take over the depots of the militia, as an expanded reserve for the Regular Army. Under multiple political pressures, Haldane made a last-minute alteration to his Territorial and Reserve Forces Act; the public purpose of the Territorial Force was changed to home defence, although its planned structure was left intact. During the First World War, by the end of April 1915, six full Territorial divisions had been deployed into the fight.

Between the wars the Territorial Army (as it was now called) was re-established to be the sole means of expansion in future wars, but it was smaller than before and poorly resourced. Yet eight TA divisions were deployed before the fall of France. After the Second World War, the TA was reconstituted with ten divisions, but then successively cut until rebuilding began in 1970, with numbers peaking at nearly 73,000. It was then run down again despite a major role in the Iraq and Afghanistan operations, bottoming at an estimated 14,000. From 2011 that trend was reversed and a new target of 30,000 trained manpower set with resourcing for training, equipment and the emphasis restored to roles for formed units and sub-units.

During periods of total war, the Army Reserve is incorporated by the royal prerogative into Regular Service under one code of Military Law for the duration of hostilities or until de-activation is decided upon. After the Second World War, for example, the Territorial Army, as it was known then, was not demobilised until 1947. Army Reservists normally have a full-time civilian job or career, which in some cases provides skills and expertise that are directly transferable to a specialist military role, such as NHS employees serving in Reservist Army Medical Services units. All Army Reserve personnel have their civilian jobs protected to a limited extent by law should they be compulsorily mobilised. There is, however, no legal protection against discrimination in employment for membership of the Army Reserve in the normal course of events (i.e. when not mobilised).

== History ==
=== Origins ===
Before the creation of the Territorial force, there were three "auxiliary forces"—the Militia, the Yeomanry, and the Volunteers. All militiamen over 19 could join the Militia Reserve, accepting the liability to serve overseas with the Regular Army in case of war if called on to do so. The second element of the auxiliary forces was the Yeomanry, 38 regiments of volunteer cavalry, which had historically been used as a form of internal security police. The third arm was the Volunteers, There were 213 rifle corps and 66 corps of artillery, though the latter were mostly coastal artillery or static "position batteries" and they did not constitute an organised field force. There were some engineer and medical units, but no service corps.

The Yeomen of the 18th century were cavalry-based units, which were often used to suppress riots (see the Peterloo Massacre). Several units that are now part of the Army Reserve bear the title "militia".

=== South African War, the need for reform and formation of the Territorial Force ===
In 1899, with the outbreak of the South African War, the British Army was committed to its first large-scale overseas deployment since the 1850s. The Cardwell Reforms of 1868–1872 had reformed the system of enlistment for the Regular Army so that recruits now served for six years with the colours and then a further six years liable for reserve service, with the Regular Reserve. The administrative structure of the Army had been further reinforced by the creation of regimental districts, where regular infantry regiments were paired together to share a depot and linked to the local militia and volunteer units.

The reforms had ensured that a sizable force of regular troops was based in the United Kingdom for service as an expeditionary force, over and above the troops already stationed overseas. However, once the decision was taken to send a corps-size field force to fight in the South African War, the system began to show a strain. By the end of January 1900, seven regular divisions, roughly half of their manpower from the Regular and Militia Reserves, had been dispatched leaving the country virtually empty of regular troops.

This was the end of the planned mobilisation; no thought had been given pre-war to mobilising the Militia, Yeomanry or Volunteers as formed units for foreign service. On 16 December, the first request was sent from South Africa for auxiliary troops, and a commitment was made to send a "considerable force of militia and picked yeomanry and volunteers". The first Volunteer unit to be sent out was a 1,300 man composite battalion group, composed of infantry recruited from across London units and a field battery from the Honourable Artillery Company, the City Imperial Volunteers, which was raised in early January 1900; it was sent into combat after six weeks of training in South Africa, where Lord Roberts described it as "quite excellent", and was returned home in October.

At the same time, a number of service companies were raised from volunteer units, employed as integral companies of their sister regular battalions, and were well regarded in the field. The decision was taken in late December to form a new force, the Imperial Yeomanry, to consist of mounted infantry. Whilst the Yeomanry provided many of the officers and NCOs, only a small number of the junior ranks came from existing Yeomanry regiments, with some more from Volunteer corps. The units performed well, but recruiting proceeded in fits and starts—recruitment stopped in May, and was only resumed in early 1901—and so an adequate supply of manpower was not always available. Sixty militia battalions, around 46,000 men, also volunteered and were eventually sent to South Africa. They were employed mainly on lines of communication, and regarded as second-line troops of low quality; this was unsurprising, as they were strongly deficient in officers, heavily composed of men of 18 and 19, who were regarded as too young by the Regular Army, with many of their best and most experienced men already deployed with regular units as members of the Militia Reserve.

The dominions and colonies provided 57 contingents, overwhelmingly of volunteer forces as none had a substantial full-time force; those from Canada alone numbered some 7,400 Altogether, Britain and her empire deployed some half a million soldiers.

After the South African War, the Conservative government embarked on a series of reorganisations that had a negative impact on all the auxiliary forces. The Militia was heavily understrength and disorganised, whilst the number of recruits for the Volunteers was falling off and it was becoming apparent that many Volunteer Corps were headed towards financial collapse unless some action was taken.

The Territorial Force was created by the Secretary of State for War, Richard Burdon Haldane, following the enactment of the Territorial and Reserve Forces Act 1907 which combined and re-organised the old Volunteer Force with the Yeomanry. As part of the same process, the remaining units of militia were converted to the Special Reserve. Most Volunteer infantry units had unique identities, but lost these in the reorganisation, becoming Territorial battalions of Regular Army infantry regiments. Only one infantry unit, the London Regiment, has maintained a separate identity.

The TF was formed on 1 April 1908 and contained fourteen infantry divisions, and fourteen mounted yeomanry brigades. It had an overall strength of approximately 269,000. Haldane designed it to provide a much larger second line for the six divisions of the Expeditionary Force which he was establishing as the centerpiece of the Regular Army. Under multiple political pressures, Haldane altered the public purpose of the Territorial Force in his Territorial and Reserve Forces Act to home defence, at the last moment.

=== First World War ===
Britain declared war on Germany on 4 August 1914. The next day, General - later Field Marshal - Haig, who had been central to Haldane's reforms and was then commanding First Corps, recorded in his diary that Field Marshal Kitchener did 'not appreciate the progress made by the Territorial Force towards efficiency', The subsequent day, the 6th, Kitchener took up his post as Secretary of State for War announcing that morning 'He could take no account of anything but regular soldiers'. He went on to denounce the Territorial Force as 'a few hundred thousand young men, officered by middle-aged professional men who were allowed to put on uniform and play at soldiers.'

Nevertheless, by 9 August, the Army Council, under Kitchener's direction, agreed that TF units volunteering en bloc for overseas service should be sent to France, while Kitchener set in hand the machinery for the recruiting of an entirely separate 'New Army' of what came to be known as Kitchener units, in parallel with the expansion of the Territorial Force. These New Army units were given priority for equipment, recruits and training over the Territorials for the bulk of the war. Kitchener justified this, during the first few months of the war, on the grounds that the Territorial Force should focus mostly on home defence.

In the first few days after the call for overseas service on 9 August, the result in many TF units was hesitant, with some units only recording around 50% volunteering, partly because men with families were reluctant to leave well-paid jobs especially while there was talk of a German invasion of the homeland, but the pace rapidly accelerated and, within a fortnight, 70 infantry battalions and many other units had collectively volunteered for France. initially TF units were either fed into regular brigades or used for secondary tasks, such as guarding lines of communication but, by the end of April 1915, six full Territorial divisions had been deployed into the fight.

The (Regular) Expeditionary Force of six divisions had been rapidly sent to the Continent, where, facing overwhelming odds, they secured the left flank of the French Army. Of the 90,000 members of the original BEF deployed in August, four-fifths were dead or wounded by Christmas. So the arrival of the Territorials, first as reinforcements and then in whole divisions came at a critical juncture, while the New Army was still forming and training. Many of the Territorial units suffered immediate heavy casualties and on the night of 20 April 1915 Second Lieutenant Geoffrey Woolley of the Queen Victoria Rifles, secured the first of the 71 Victoria Crosses won by Territorials in the First World War.

General Sir John French, General Officer Commanding the BEF, later wrote 'Without the assistance which the Territorials afforded between October 1914 and June 1915, it would have been impossible to hold the line in France and Belgium.

Other Territorial formations were dispatched to Egypt and British India and other imperial garrisons, such as Gibraltar, thereby releasing regular units for service in France and enabling the formation of an additional five regular army divisions by early 1915. Territorial divisions went on to fight in all the major battles of the war in France and Belgium and several campaigns further afield including Gallipoli. (See main article Territorial Force).

From 1916, as the war progressed, and casualties mounted, the distinctive character of territorial units was diluted by the inclusion of conscript and New Army drafts. Following the Armistice all units of the Territorial Force were gradually disbanded.

=== Interwar re-establishment and mobilisation in 1939 ===
The Territorial Force (TF) was officially reconstituted in 1921 by the Territorial Army and Militia Act 1921 and renamed in October as the Territorial Army (TA). The First-Line divisions (that were created in 1907 or 1908) were reconstituted in that year. The TA's intended role was to be the sole method of expanding the size of the British Armed Forces, when compared to the varied methods used during the First World War including the creation of Kitchener's Army. All TA recruits were required to take the general service obligation: if the British Government decided, territorial soldiers could be deployed overseas for combat that avoided the complications of the TF, whose members were not required to leave Britain unless they volunteered for overseas service.

The composition of the divisions was altered, with a reduction in the number of infantry battalions required. There was also a reduced need for cavalry, and of the 55 yeomanry regiments, only the 14 most senior retained their horses. The remaining yeomanry was converted to artillery or armored car units or disbanded. The amalgamation of 40 pairs of infantry battalions was announced in October 1921. As part of the post-war "Geddes Axe" financial cuts, the TA was further reduced in size in 1922: artillery batteries lost two of their six guns, the established size of infantry battalions was cut and ancillary medical, veterinary, signals and Royal Army Service Corps units were either reduced in size or abolished. The bounty was also reduced to £3 for trained men and £2.10s 0d for recruits, which resulted in finding £1,175,000 of the total savings required from the army as a whole. An innovation in 1922 was the creation of two Air Defence Brigades to provide anti-aircraft defence for London. It appears that these two brigades relatively quickly became 26th and 27th Air Defence Brigades.

During the 1930s, tensions increased between Germany and the United Kingdom and its allies. In late 1937 and throughout 1938, German demands for the annexation of Sudetenland in Czechoslovakia led to an international crisis. To avoid war, the British Prime Minister Neville Chamberlain met with German Chancellor Adolf Hitler in September and brokered the Munich Agreement. The agreement averted a war and allowed Germany to annex the Sudetenland. Although Chamberlain had intended the agreement to lead to a further peaceful resolution of issues, relations between both countries soon deteriorated. On 15 March 1939, Germany breached the terms of the agreement by invading and occupying the remnants of the Czech state.

On 29 March, Secretary of State for War Leslie Hore-Belisha announced plans to increase the TA from 130,000 to 340,000 men and double the number of TA divisions. The plan was for existing TA units to recruit over their establishments (aided by an increase in pay for Territorials, the removal of restrictions on promotion, which had hindered recruiting, construction of better-quality barracks and an increase in supper rations) and then form second-line divisions from cadres that could be increased. The total strength of the TA was to be 440,000: the field force of the Territorial Army was to rise from 130,000 to 340,000, organized in 26 divisions, while an additional 100,000 all ranks would form the anti-aircraft section. The forming Second Line formations were given liberty to be numbered and named as they saw fit, with some using related names and numbers from the First World War e.g. the 23rd (Northumbrian) Infantry Division formed in 1939.

The immediate response to this announcement was a vast surge in recruiting with 88,000 men enlisted by the end of April. The London Rifle Brigade raised a second battalion in 24 hours. On 26 April, limited conscription was introduced. This resulted in 34,500 twenty-year-old militiamen being conscripted into the regular army, initially to be trained for six months before deployment to the forming second-line units. In parallel, recruits continued to surge into the Territorial Army but there were grave shortages of instructors and equipment. It was envisioned that the duplicating process and recruiting the required numbers of men would take no more than six months. In practice, existing TA units found themselves stripped of regular training staffs and often many of their own officers and NCOs to form and train the new units, long before their own units were fully trained. As a result, some TA divisions had made little progress by the time the Second World War began; others, who had started from a stronger position, were able to complete this work within a matter of weeks.

=== Second World War ===
The TA's war deployment plan envisioned the divisions being deployed, as equipment became available, in waves to reinforce the British Expeditionary Force (BEF) that had already been dispatched to Europe. The TA would join regular army divisions when they had completed their training. In 1938, it was envisaged that this would take at least eight months from mobilisation. In fact, with mobilisation in September 1939, the first three TA divisions arrived to take their places in the front line by February 1940: the 48th (South Midland) Division, 50th (Northumbrian) Division and 51st (Highland) Division. In April, they were joined by five more, 12th (Eastern) Division, 23rd (2nd Northumbrian) Division, 42nd (East Lancashire) Division, 44th (Home Counties) Division and the 46th Division, making eight of the thirteen British divisions deployed, although three, 12th, 23rd, and 46th, were deployed, minus much of their equipment, and dubbed 'labour divisions' to be used for infrastructure work.

In practice, all of the divisions were heavily engaged in the fighting. The 42nd, 44th, and 48th took part in the stand on the River Escaut, The 50th, 42nd, and 46th were chosen for the final stand at the perimeter of Dunkirk, despite the 46th being one of the digging" divisions with few anti-tank guns and artillery pieces. A London TA battalion, the Queen Victoria's Rifles deployed at Calais and fought off German reconnaissance forces before the arrival of the two regular sister battalions with whom they held the town for two crucial days shielding the Dunkirk evacuation.

Further south, The 51st fought in a rearguard action with the largely French forces along the Somme. At the same time, a small TA unit, the Kent Fortress Royal Engineers, carried out the first major commando-style operations of the war the XD Operations, destroying 2 million tons of crude and refined oil, along the coastline of France and the low countries.

Meanwhile, units with little training and cohesion were also sent abroad, despite their lack of preparation; the TA units which formed a majority of those which took part in the Narvik operation were untrained and had been subject to such turbulence, through expansion and reorganisation that many lacked cohesion. The failures of command, coordination and execution in that campaign led to a debate on its conduct with a no-confidence vote in the government. Partially as a result of lessons from Narvik, the Territorial Army was ordered to form 10 elite Independent Companies, forerunners of the Commandos. under the command of (then) Lt Colonel Colin Gubbins.

As the war developed Territorial units fought in every major theatre. The first reinforcing unit into Kohima, where the Japanese suffered their first major defeat in mainland Asia, was a TA unit, 4th Battalion, Queen's Own Royal West Kent Regiment who went on to hold the Tennis Court in some of the hardest fighting of the battle. Later the commander of the 14th Army, of which they were part, Field Marshal Slim, himself a pre-First World War Territorial became Chief of the Imperial General Staff and a strong promoter of the TA, coining the expression still in use today that Territorials are 'twice a citizen'. One pre-war Guards reservist, (then) Major David Stirling set up the Special Air Service, in North Africa, which fathered several other special forces units, including the Special Boat Service.

After VJ Day in August 1945, the Territorial Army was reduced and re-structured.

==== List of Territorial Army Divisions, Second World War ====
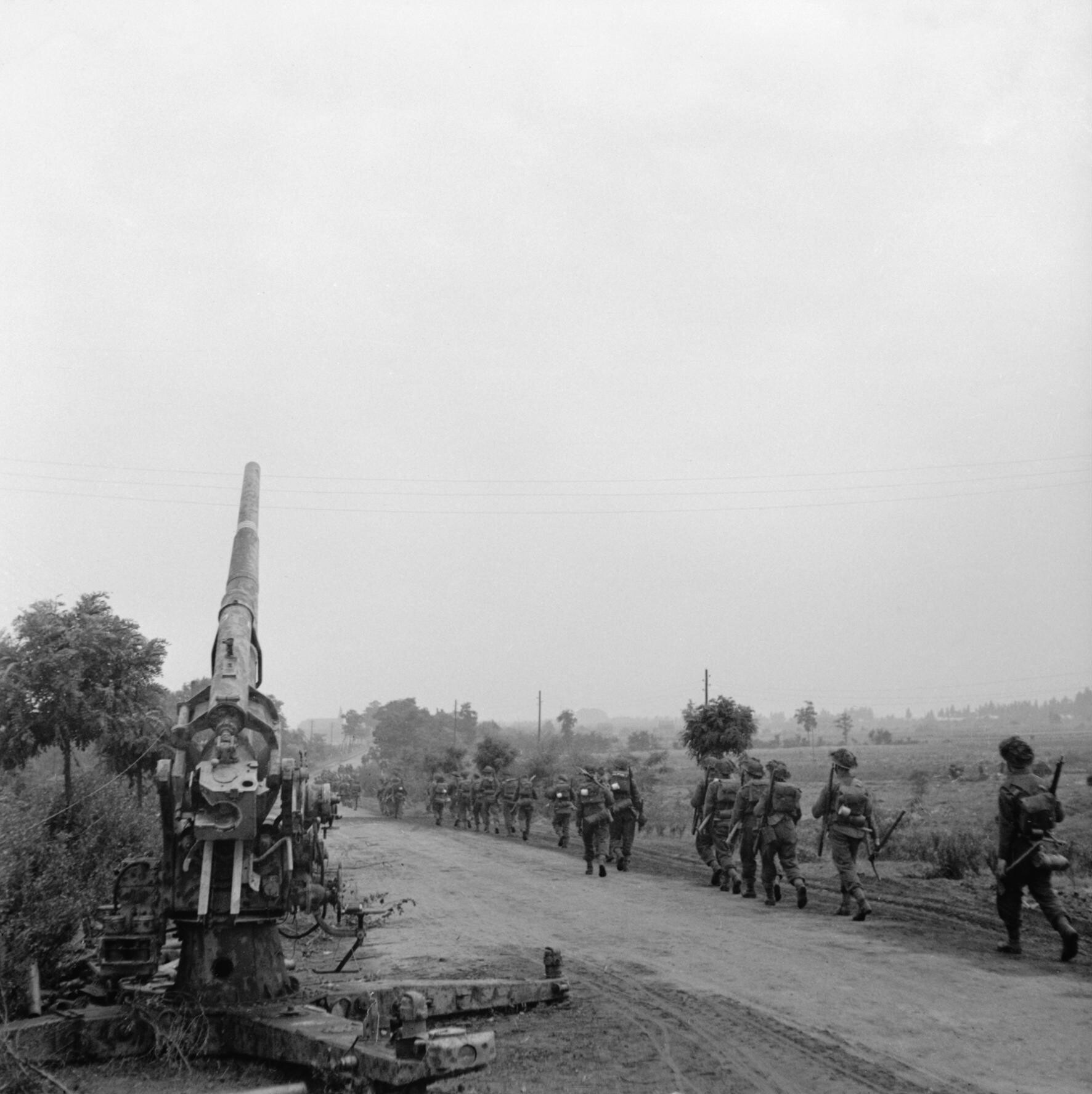
Infantry of 231st Brigade, 50th (Northumbrian) Division moving up past a knocked-out German 88mm gun near 'Joe's Bridge' over the Meuse-Escaut Canal in Belgium, 16 September 1944

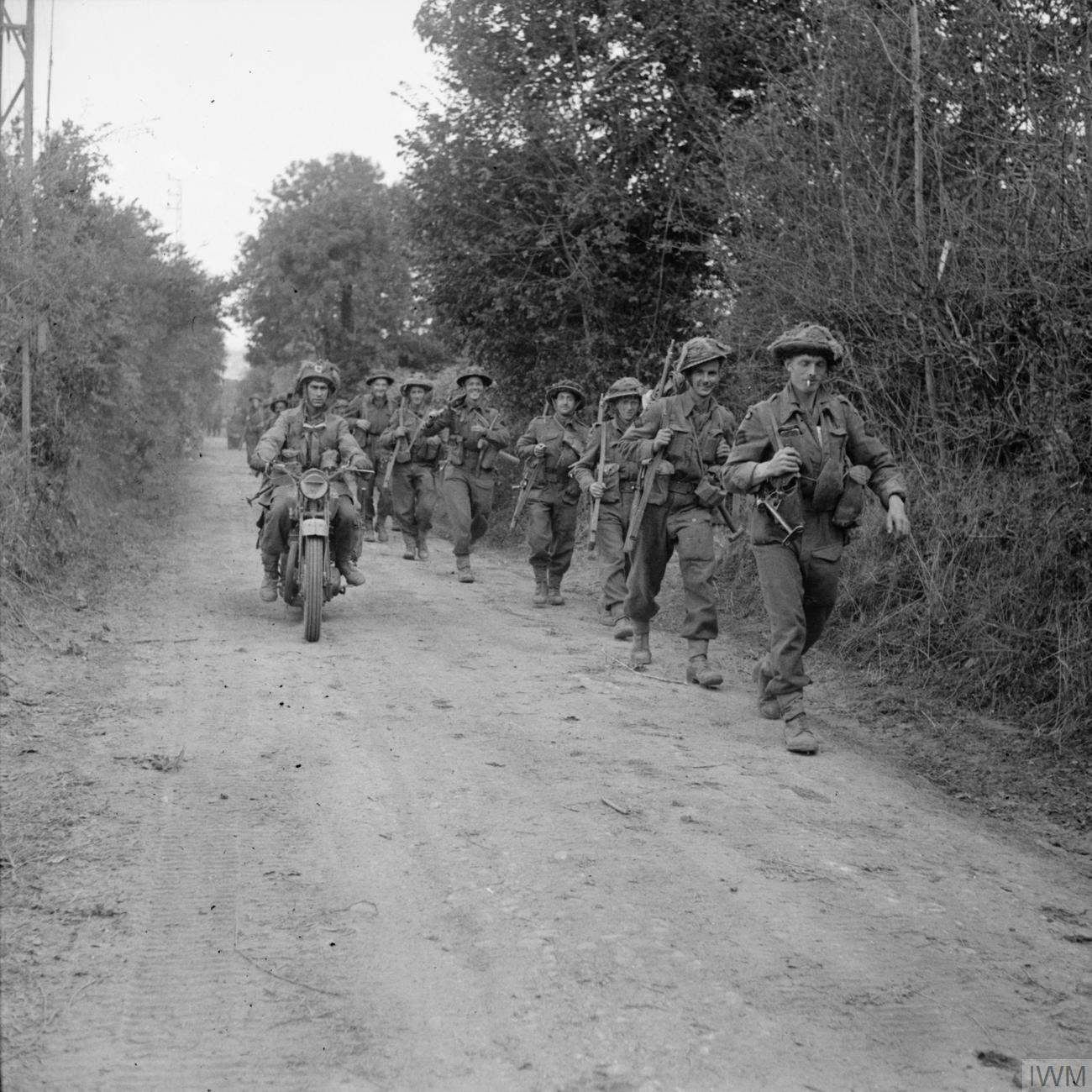
A motorcycle and infantry of the 2nd Battalion, Glasgow Highlanders, 46th Infantry Brigade, 15th (Scottish) Infantry Division, advance along a lane near Caumont, 30 July 1944.

First Line	Second Line
1st Cavalry Division (1st Line Yeomanry)	
1st London Division (Later 56th (London) Infantry Division)	2nd London Division (Later 47th (London) Infantry Division)
42nd (East Lancashire) Infantry Division	66th Infantry Division
43rd (Wessex) Infantry Division	45th Infantry Division
44th (Home Counties) Infantry Division	12th (Eastern) Infantry Division
48th (South Midland) Infantry Division	61st Infantry Division
49th (West Riding) Infantry Division	46th Infantry Division
50th (Northumbrian) Infantry Division	23rd (Northumbrian) Infantry Division
51st (Highland) Infantry Division	9th (Highland) Infantry Division
52nd (Lowland) Infantry Division	15th (Scottish) Infantry Division
53rd (Welsh) Infantry Division	38th (Welsh) Infantry Division
54th (East Anglian) Infantry Division	18th Infantry Division
55th (West Lancashire) Infantry Division	59th (Staffordshire) Infantry Division

=== Postwar and Cold War ===
In 1947, the TA was restructured and expanded through the reactivation of some of the 1st Line divisions that were initially disbanded after the war, keeping its former role of supplying complete divisions to the regular Army until 1967. For the first time, TA units were formed in Northern Ireland. The maneuver divisions established or re-established in 1947 were:

- 16th Airborne Division, under the command of Major-General Robert E. "Roy" Urquhart
- 42nd (Lancashire) Infantry Division
- 43rd (Wessex) Infantry Division
- 44th (Home Counties) Infantry Division
- 49th (West Riding & North Midland) Armoured Division (49th (West Riding and North Midland) Division/District in 1961)
- 50th (Northumbrian) Infantry Division (50th Northumbrian District by 1966)
- 51st/52nd (Lowland) Infantry Division
- 53rd (Welsh) Infantry Division
- 56th (London) Armoured Division

52nd (Lowland) Division was re-established as a tenth, 'mixed' division in March 1950. Three corps were planned to supervise the divisions. Two appear to have been actually formed, XXI (Northern) Corps, and XXIII (Southern) Corps. The planned 22nd Corps in Western Command was never formed although its sign, 'XXII in gold on blue with a red edge' was recorded in a Western Command letter to the War Office of 3rd July 1947 to be found in National Archives file WO32/18819.

The Territorials also provided much of the Anti-aircraft warfare defence for the United Kingdom until 1956. In that year, Anti-Aircraft Command and 15 anti-aircraft regiments of the Royal Artillery were disbanded, with nine others passing into "suspended animation" as new English Electric Thunderbird Surface to Air Missile units replaced them. On 20 December 1955, the Secretary of State for War informed the House of Commons that the armoured divisions and the 'mixed' division were to be converted to infantry, and the 16th Airborne Division reduced to a parachute brigade group. Only two divisions (43rd and 53rd), two armoured brigades, and a parachute brigade were to remain allocated for NATO and the defence of Western Europe; the other eight divisions were placed on a lower establishment for home defence only. The territorial units of the Royal Armoured Corps were also reduced in number to nine armoured regiments and eleven reconnaissance regiments. This was effected by the amalgamation of pairs of regiments, and the conversion of four RAC units to an infantry role. The new parachute brigade group become the 44th Independent Parachute Brigade Group.

British forces contracted dramatically as the end of conscription in 1960 came in sight as announced in the 1957 Defence White Paper. On 20 July 1960, a reorganisation of the TA was announced in the House of Commons. The territorials were to be reduced from 266 fighting units to 195. There was to be a reduction of 46 regiments of the Royal Artillery, 18 battalions of infantry, 12 regiments of the Royal Engineers and two regiments of the Royal Corps of Signals. The reductions were carried out in 1961, mainly by amalgamating units. Thus, on 1 May 1961, the TA divisional headquarters were merged with regular army districts, which were matched with Civil Defence Regions to aid mobilisation for war.

The Army Reserve Act of April 1962 made provision for a new TA Emergency Reserve (TAER), within existing TA units, who could be called out without Royal Proclamation as individuals to reinforce regular units around the world, for up to six months in every twelve. With opposition from employers and individuals to such a large peacetime liability, the target of 15,000 volunteers proved over-ambitious and the force peaked at 4,262 in October 1963, then dropping to around 2,400 by 1968. Nevertheless, the first batch of these so-called 'Ever Readies' was sent to Libya in 1963, followed by 200 to the Far East later that year. In 1965, 175 were called out, the majority deploying to Aden, where one of their officers, Lieutenant Mike Smith, won an MC.

==== 1966 White Paper: major cuts and a new name ====
This was followed by a large reduction and complete reorganisation, announced in the 1966 Defence White Paper and implemented from 1 April 1967, when the title Territorial and Army Volunteer Reserve (TAVR) was adopted. This abolished the former divisional structure of the TA. The size of the TAVR was to be reduced from 107,000 to under 50,000, with the infantry reduced from 86 to 13 battalions and the yeomanry (armoured units) from 20 to one. Units in the new TAVR were divided into various categories:

- TAVR I - Special Army Volunteer Reserve or 'Ever Readies', echoing the earlier nickname for the TAER, bringing the Regular Army to war establishment and replacing casualties. These were to be given extra training and equipment and could now be called out by Queen's Order rather than Royal Proclamation in anticipation of war and
- TAVR II - forces called 'The Volunteers', for whom the old call-out arrangements continued. This category was split further split into TAVR IIA (Independent), e.g.: 51st Highland Volunteers and TAVR IIB (Sponsored), e.g.: Central Volunteer Headquarters, Royal Artillery.

In addition were various miscellaneous units, such as OTCs and bands e.g. Northumbria Band of the Royal Regiment of Fusiliers.

In the face of a considerable Parliamentary battle, and a public outcry led by the County Associations, the government agreed to retain an additional 28,000 men in 87 'lightly armed' infantry units and a few signals units in a category called TAVR III, designed for home defence, but, months later in January 1968, these were all earmarked to be disbanded, with 90 becoming eight-man "cadres". In November that year, the call-out arrangements for TAVR II units were brought in line with TAVR I.

==== Rebuilding capability and exercising roles ====
In 1971, the new government decided to expand the TAVR, which led to the formation of twenty infantry battalions based on some of these cadres. In 1979, again, a new government planned further expansion. In the Reserve Forces Act of 1982, the Territorial Army title was restored, and, in the following years, its size was again increased, together with new equipment and extra training, the target being 86,000 by 1990. Some brigades were re-formed, which consisted mostly of TA units, including two out of three brigades for a new reserve division for the British Army of the Rhine (BAOR). In addition, a new organisation was established, the Home Service Force, with a separate target of 4,500, composed of older ex-regulars and territorials to guard key points, and a pilot program begun to raise "continental TA" units from among ex-servicemen who had settled in Western Europe.

As the Cold War intensified, the scale and pace of exercises involving the TA in its war roles increased. Two large-scale exercises were mounted testing the Army's ability to reinforce BAOR, Crusader in 1980 and Lionheart in 1984. The latter involved 131,000 British service personnel, including 35,000 Territorials, together with US, Dutch and German personnel. This was the largest British troop movement exercise by sea and air since 1945, involving 290 flights and 150 ferry sailings. Most UK-based units reached their wartime stations within 48 hours. In 1985, Exercise Brave Defender tested Britain's home defences, with 65,000 regulars and territorials involved.

=== 1988 to 2011: Reduced again but back on operations ===
At the end of the Cold War, the TA had a strength of 72,823, including 3,297 in the Home Service Force (HSF). in the 1991 Gulf War 205 Scottish General Hospital was mobilised as a unit based in Riyadh, Saudi Arabia, and a number of TA staff officers and others volunteered and served during the conflict, either in supporting roles in Germany or within 1 (UK) Armoured Division in the Middle East.

In December 1991, as part of the reductions in Options for Change, it was announced that the TA's establishment was to be reduced to 63,000, while the HSF element was to be disbanded. In July 1994, this was further reduced to 59,000.

The Reserve Forces Act of May 1996 was a landmark reform, making it much easier to call out any element of the Reserves at the behest of the Secretary of State for a range of purposes including 'protection of life or property' well short of the criteria for Queen's Order (e.g. 'great emergency', 'imminent national danger'). It also provides protection in employment law for members' civilian jobs should they be mobilised. This has led to the Army Reserve increasingly providing routine support for the Regular Army overseas including the delivery of composite units to release regular units from standing liabilities; including Bosnia, Kosovo, Cyprus and the Falkland Islands. Some 2,800 TA personnel volunteered for and deployed on Operation Resolute from 1995 to 1998, the UK's contribution to the NATO mission to enforce peace in the Former Yugoslavia. These were a mixture of formed units and individuals.

In Tony Blair's Strategic Defence Review of 1998, the TA's size was reduced to 41,200.

In 2003, 9,500 reservists were mobilised to take part in Operation TELIC, the invasion of Iraq. Reservists were deployed in a mixture of formed bodies and as individuals. For example, a formed sub-unit from 131 Commando Squadron Royal Engineers opened up a beach landing point on the Al Faw Peninsula and then two further crossing points on sequential watercourses for tanks in the attack on Basra. The Royal Yeomanry mobilised Regimental Headquarters (RHQ) and two sub-units to deliver the UK's Chemical, Radiological, Biological, and Nuclear counter-measures for Operation TELIC. At the peak in 2004, reservists made up 20% of Britain's strength in Iraq.

In Afghanistan too, large numbers of reservists deployed in a mixture of formed units and as individuals, until 2009 when the decision was taken to allow only individuals to deploy as reinforcements for regular units. One example of a formed body was Somme Company of The London regiment of whom Brigadier (later Lieutenant-General Sir) John Lorimer remarked: "Somme Company was an outstanding body of men: well trained, highly motivated and exceptionally well led." Approximately 1,200 members of the Army Reserve deployed annually on tours of duty in Iraq, Operation HERRICK in Afghanistan and elsewhere, normally on six-month-long roulements. Medical personnel were routinely deployed as formed units and individual augmentees since the start of operations in Iraq and, since 2003, Reserves provided over 40% of the hospital-based personnel for operations in Afghanistan and provided the 'lead unit' for 50% of the operational tours.

By 2011, across Iraq and Afghanistan, a number of reservists had been decorated and 27 had given their lives.

=== 2011: Rebuilding and named the Army Reserve ===
In 2010, the government set up a commission, chaired by General Sir Nicholas Houghton, to review the state of the reserves and to design their future. The commission reported in July 2011. It found that, despite their operational commitments, the reserves had been neglected: some estimates put its trained and active strength as low as 14,000. There had been 'a failure to resource recruiting and good training, especially collective training; to offer career progression; to update operational roles; to permit deployment in formed sub-units and therefore offer command opportunities' Its recommendations included that a new target of 30,000 trained strength by 2020 be set.

The government published the report on 18 July with an immediate promise of £1.5 billion funding over ten years. In October 2012 MoD announced a new name for the Territorial Army, its current name, the Army Reserve. Most of the recommendations of the commission were adopted in the White Paper July 2013 including the critical importance of providing operational and training opportunities for formed units and sub-units.

Some aspects required legislation and were introduced in the Defence Reform Act (2014). These included the name change, reforms in mobilisation arrangements and in employer compensation. They also included giving the Reserve Forces and Cadets Associations the power to produce an annual report to Parliament on the state of the volunteer reserves (the Royal Naval Reserve, The Royal Marines Reserve, the Army Reserve and the Royal Auxiliary Air Force). In January 2021, the Army Reserve trained strength stood at 26,820. (This figure excludes recruits undergoing phase 1 training and various non-deployable categories such as University Officers' Training Corps). During 2020, three reserve infantry battalions, 7 Rifles and 5 Fusiliers followed by 6 Rifles, provided the framework battalion for peacekeeping in Cyprus and over the winter 20/21 the Royal Yeomanry provided a composite squadron for a six-month tour on armoured reconnaissance as part of Britain's forward presence in Estonia.

Army Reservists have a minimum commitment to serve 27 training days per year or 19 days for some national units. This period normally includes a two-week period of continuous training either as an Army Reserve unit, on courses or attached to a Regular unit. Army Reserve soldiers are paid at a similar rate to their regular equivalents while engaged on military activities.

== Basic training ==
=== Soldiers ===
For Army Reserve soldiers, recruit training is structured into two phases: Phase 1, also known as the Common Military Syllabus (Recruit) (CMS(R)), and Phase 2, specialist training.

Phase 1

In Phase 1, recruits cover the Common Military Syllabus (Reserve)14 (CMS(R)14). Phase 1 A is a series of 5 training weekends at regional Army Training Units (ATUs), or the recruit could attend a consolidated Phase 1 A 9-day long course. Phase 1 training concludes with a 16-day long Phase 1 B training course normally held at the Army Training Centre Pirbright or the Army Training Regiment, Winchester, or Grantham. Recruits to the 4th Battalion, The Parachute Regiment and the Honourable Artillery Company complete their equivalent of CMS(R) within their own units.

Phase 2

Phase 1 is followed by Phase 2, a further period of specialist training specific to the type of unit the recruit is joining. This is normally conducted by the Arm or Service that the recruit is joining; for example, for infantry units, Phase 2 consists of the two-week Combat Infantryman's Course (TA) (CIC (TA)) held at the Infantry Training Centre, Catterick.

=== Officers ===
To gain a commission, Potential Officers have to pass the two stages of the Army Officer Selection Board (AOSB) and then successfully complete four modules of training, which together form the Army Reserve Commissioning Course. For professionally qualified officers (doctors, vets, lawyers etc.), there is only one stage at the AOSB.

Module A consists of basic field training and elementary military skills. This can be completed at either a UOTC over a number of weekends or over 2 weeks at the Royal Military Academy Sandhurst (RMAS).

Module B covers training in Tactics, Leadership, Doctrine and Navigation, both in theory and in practice, with a focus on the section battle drills and the platoon combat estimate. This training can either be spread over 10 weekends at a UOTC, or 2 weeks at the RMAS.

Module C builds on the Tactics, Leadership, Doctrine, and Navigation taught in Module B, with a greater focus on the theory behind these constructs. CBRN training is also added at this point, and Officer Cadets undergo a number of field exercises to test their military and leadership skills. Module C can only be undertaken at the RMAS.

Module D Once the Officer Cadet has completed their Army Officer Selection Board, they can complete this final module, after which they will become commissioned officers in the British Army. Based at the RMAS, this module consists primarily of a prolonged field exercise, followed by drill training in preparation for the passing out parade.

On successful completion of Module D, the Officer Cadets receive their Commission and become Second Lieutenants. Further training that is required prior to them being considered for operational deployment and promotion to Lieutenant includes:

Post Commissioning Training (formerly known as Module 5), again run at an OTC, over 3 weekends.

Special To Arm training is specific to the type of unit the Subaltern is joining and covers a 2-week period. This is increasingly integrated with the tactics phase of a Regular training course. For example, the Platoon Commander's Battle Course held at the Infantry Battle School in Brecon, which is integrated within a Regular training course, or the Light Cavalry Commander's Course held at the Reconnaissance & Armoured Tactics Division in Warminster, which is run separately to Regular training courses.

== Order of precedence ==
Preceded by Honourable Artillery Company	Order of Precedence	Succeeded by Royal Gibraltar Regiment

== See also ==
- List of Territorial Army units (2012)
- Auxiliary Territorial Service
- Auxiliary Units (1940–1944)
- Home Guard (1940–1944)
- Home Service Force (1982–1993)
- Reserve Forces and Cadets Association
- Royal Auxiliary Air Force
- Royal Marines Reserve
- Royal Naval Reserve
- Territorial Decoration
- The Territorial Army (British Rail)
- Volunteer Reserves Service Medal

== Bibliography ==
- Allport, Alan (2015). Browned Off and Bloody-minded: The British Soldier Goes to War 1939–1945. New Haven: Yale University Press. ISBN 978-0-300-17075-7.
- Beckett, Ian F. W. Territorials: A Century of Service, first published April 2008 by DRA Printing of 14 Mary Seacole Road, The Millfields, Plymouth PL1 3JY on behalf of TA 100, ISBN 978-0-9557813-1-5
- Bell, P. M. H. (1997) [1986]. The Origins of the Second World War in Europe (2nd ed.). London: Pearson. ISBN 978-0-582-30470-3.
- Campbell, John (2020). Haldane: The Forgotten Statesman Who Shaped Modern Britain. London: Hurst & Co.
- Dennis, Peter (1987). The Territorial Army. Woodbridge: The Royal Historical Society: Boydell Press.
- Dunlop, John K (1938). The development of the British Army 1899–1914. London: Methuen.
- Frederick, J. B. M. (1984). Lineage book of British land forces 1660-1978 : biographical outlines of cavalry, yeomanry, armour, artillery, infantry, marines and air force land troops of regular and reserve forces (Volume I). Wakefield: Microform Academic. ISBN 978-1-85117-007-4. OCLC 18072764.
- French, David (2001) [2000]. Raising Churchill's Army: The British Army and the War Against Germany 1919–1945. Oxford: Oxford University Press. ISBN 978-0-199-24630-4.
- Gibbs, N. H. (1976). Grand Strategy. History of the Second World War. Vol. I. London: HMSO. ISBN 978-0-116-30181-9.
- Gregory, Barry (2006). A History of the Artists Rifles 1859-1947. Barnsley: Pen and Sword.
- Heyman, M. A. The Territorial Army – 1999 – An archive document of The TA in 1999 before the implementation of The Strategic Defence Review.
- Joslen, H. F. (2003) [1960]. Orders of Battle: Second World War, 1939–1945. Uckfield, East Sussex: Naval and Military Press. ISBN 978-1-84342-474-1.
- Levy, James P. (2006). Appeasement and Rearmament: Britain, 1936–1939. Lanham: Rowman & Littlefield. ISBN 978-0-742-54537-3.
- Kiszley, John (2017). Anatomy of a Campaign, The British Fiasco in Norway, 1940. Cambridge: Cambridge University Press.
- Messenger, Charles (1994). For Love of Regiment 1915–1994. A History of British Infantry. Vol. II. London: Pen & Sword Books. ISBN 978-0-850-52422-2.
- Messenger, Charles (2005). Call to Arms: the British Army 1914–18. London: Cassell. ISBN 9780304367221.
- Miller, Russell (2013). Uncle Bill, The Authorised Biography of Field Marshal Viscount Slim. London: Weidenfeld and Nicolson.
- Perry, Frederick William (1988). The Commonwealth Armies: Manpower and Organisation in Two World Wars. War, Armed Forces and Society. Manchester: Manchester University Press. ISBN 978-0-7190-2595-2.
- Simkins, Peter (2007) [1988]. Kitchener's Army: The Raising of the New Armies 1914–1916. Barnsley: Pen & Sword Military. ISBN 978-1-844-15585-9.
- Sebag-Montefiore, Hugh (2006). Dunkirk, Fight to the Last Man. New York: Viking.
- Sellwood, A. V. (1966). The Saturday Night Soldiers: The Stirring Story of the Territorial Army. London: Wolfe Publishing.
- Sheppard, Eric (1950). A short history of the British Army (4th ed.). London: Constable.
