= MGWR Class 7 =

Class of 1 Irish 0-4-0 locomotive

Type and origin
- Power type: Steam
- Builder: R & W Hawthorn, Leith
- Serial number: 786
- Build date: 1852
- Total produced: MGWR: 1
Specifications
- Configuration
  - Whyte: 0-4-0
- Gauge: 5 ft 3 in (1,600 mm)
- Coupled dia.: 5 ft 0 in (1,520 mm)
- Cylinder size: 15 in × 20 in (381 mm × 508 mm)
Career
- Operators: Midland Great Western Railway (MGWR)
- Numbers: 24→94
- Locale: Ireland
- Delivered: 1852
- Withdrawn: 1873-1876

The MGWR Class 7 consisted of a single engine named Hawthorne for the Midland Great Western Railway of Ireland. It was the sole representative of type 0-4-0 on the MGWR though the builder R and W Hawthorn of Leith, Scotland had similar engines in build for the Great Southern and Western Railway at the same time. It was ordered for the luggage train service, and as such was the MGWR's first order for a specifically goods locomotive. The locomotive was named Hawthorne which relates to the locomotive builder but spelt with an additional 'e'. The lead locomotive of the later MGWR Class H was also named after its builder, Avonside. Hawthorne remained in service for just over 20 years.

| MGWR No. | Name | Introduced | Withdrawn |
|---|---|---|---|
| 24→94 | Hawthorne | 1852 | 1873/6 |
