= BR Standard Class 7 70048 The Territorial Army 1908–1958 =

BR 70048 The Territorial Army 1908-1958
Type and origin
- Power type: Steam
- Designer: Robert Riddles
- Builder: BR Crewe Works
- Build date: July 1954
Specifications
- Configuration
  - Whyte: 4-6-2
  - UIC: 2′C1′h2
- Gauge: 4 ft 8 1/2 in (1,435 mm) standard gauge
- Driver dia.: 6 ft 2 in (1.880 m)
- Trailing dia.: 3 ft 3 1/2 in (1.003 m)
- Fuel type: Coal
- Cylinders: Two, outside
Career
- Operators: British Railways
- Class: Standard Class 7
- Power class: 7MT
- Numbers: 70048
- Official name: The Territorial Army 1908-1958
- Retired: 6 May 1967
- Disposition: Scrapped

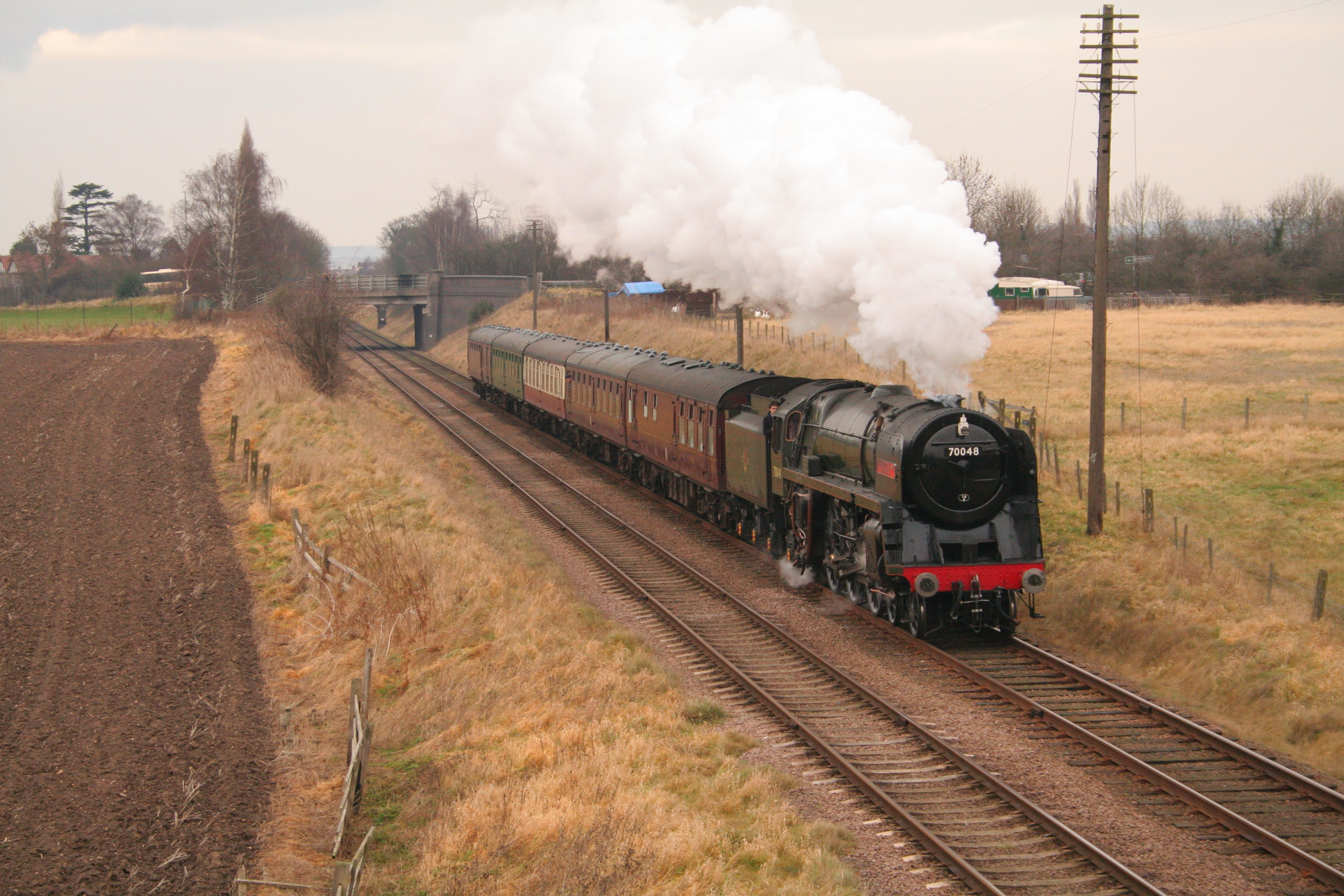
70013 in the guise of 70048 approaching Woodthorpe Lane bridge

70048 The Territorial Army 1908–1958 was a British Railways BR standard class 7 (also known as Britannia class) steam locomotive, named after the Territorial Army, a part of the British Army.

== Career ==
It was built at a cost of £23,445 at Crewe Works, being completed on 8 July 1954. It was allocated a BR1D 'high sided' tender number 982 and allocated to Holyhead depot.

Initially unnamed, it was not until 23 July 1958 when it was given its title by the Duke of Norfolk. It was probably no coincidence that the engine's driver on the day was Fred Brookes, himself a former Territorial. At the naming ceremony, David Blee, general manager of the London Midland Region, recognised that with the increasing use of diesel haulage it was likely that 70048 would not remain in service for much longer and suggested that the name The Territorial Army 1908–1958 would be transferred to a diesel-electric locomotive, although it never happened.

During its life it was allocated to various depots including Chester, Willesden, Newton Heath, Annesley, Aston, Carlisle Upperby and finally Carlisle Kingmoor. It was from this shed that it was finally withdrawn from service on 6 May 1967 and scrapped on 12 September 1967.

== Commemoration ==
On 8 November 2008 preserved sibling loco No. 70013 'Oliver Cromwell' was temporarily re-numbered as 70048 and temporarily renamed 'Territorial Army 1908–2008' as part of a ceremony to commemorate the 100th anniversary of the Territorial Army. The new name was carried on the left-hand-side smoke deflector, with the original 'Territorial Army 1908–1958' nameplate on the right. The naming was performed by the Duke of Gloucester at Quorn station on the preserved Great Central Railway.
