= Milton rail crash =

1955 railway accident in the UK

Coordinates: 51°37′13″N 1°17′28″W

Details
- Date: Sunday, 20 November 1955
- Location: Milton
- Country: England
- Line: Great Western Main Line
- Incident type: Derailment caused by excessive speed
- Cause: Driver's error

Statistics
- Trains: 1
- Deaths: 11
- Injured: 157

The Milton rail crash was a crash in 1955, at Milton, Berkshire (now part of Oxfordshire). A passenger train took a crossover too fast and derailed. Eleven people were killed, and 157 injured.

== Overview ==
The crash occurred at about 13:15 on Sunday, 20 November 1955, at Milton, between Steventon and Didcot on the line from Swindon on the Western Region of British Railways. The train involved was the 08:30 Paddington station-bound excursion train from Treherbert, South Wales, consisting of ten coaches hauled by Britannia Pacific no. 70026 Polar Star. Due to engineering work, the train was routed over a low-speed crossover into the goods loop, but the train failed to slow down for it. The driver has not read the weekly notice informing him of the diversion, and although the AWS appeared to have operated at the preceding signal at caution, it failed to slow down the train

The engine and several carriages rolled down an embankment, which exacerbated the severity of the accident.

== Contributing factors ==
Because the track involved had been formerly operated by the Great Western Railway, the signals were on the right hand side, but the train was hauled by one of the new British Railways Standard Class 7 locomotives, which had its driving position on the left hand side. This incompatibility hampered the driver's view of the signals.

There was a berth track circuit approaching the crossover, but it was much longer than the train, which made it hard for the signalman to estimate the speed of the train.

== Aftermath ==
The signals were later modified to prevent a driver seeing a proceed signal for the crossover too soon. This is known as approach release.

Handrails on the smoke deflectors also obscured the drivers' view, and these were later removed and replaced with hand holds on all the "Britannia" class locomotives that ran on the Western Region.

== See also ==
- (United Kingdom) Bourne End rail crash – similar overspeed through turnout
- (United Kingdom) Goswick rail crash – similar overspeed through turnout
- Jokela rail crash – similar overspeed accident in Finland
- (United Kingdom) Colwich rail crash – overspeed through turnout, signal aspects a factor
- Lists of rail accidents
