= Milton, Vale of White Horse =

Village in Oxfordshire, England

Coordinates: 51.627°N 1.298°W

Milton
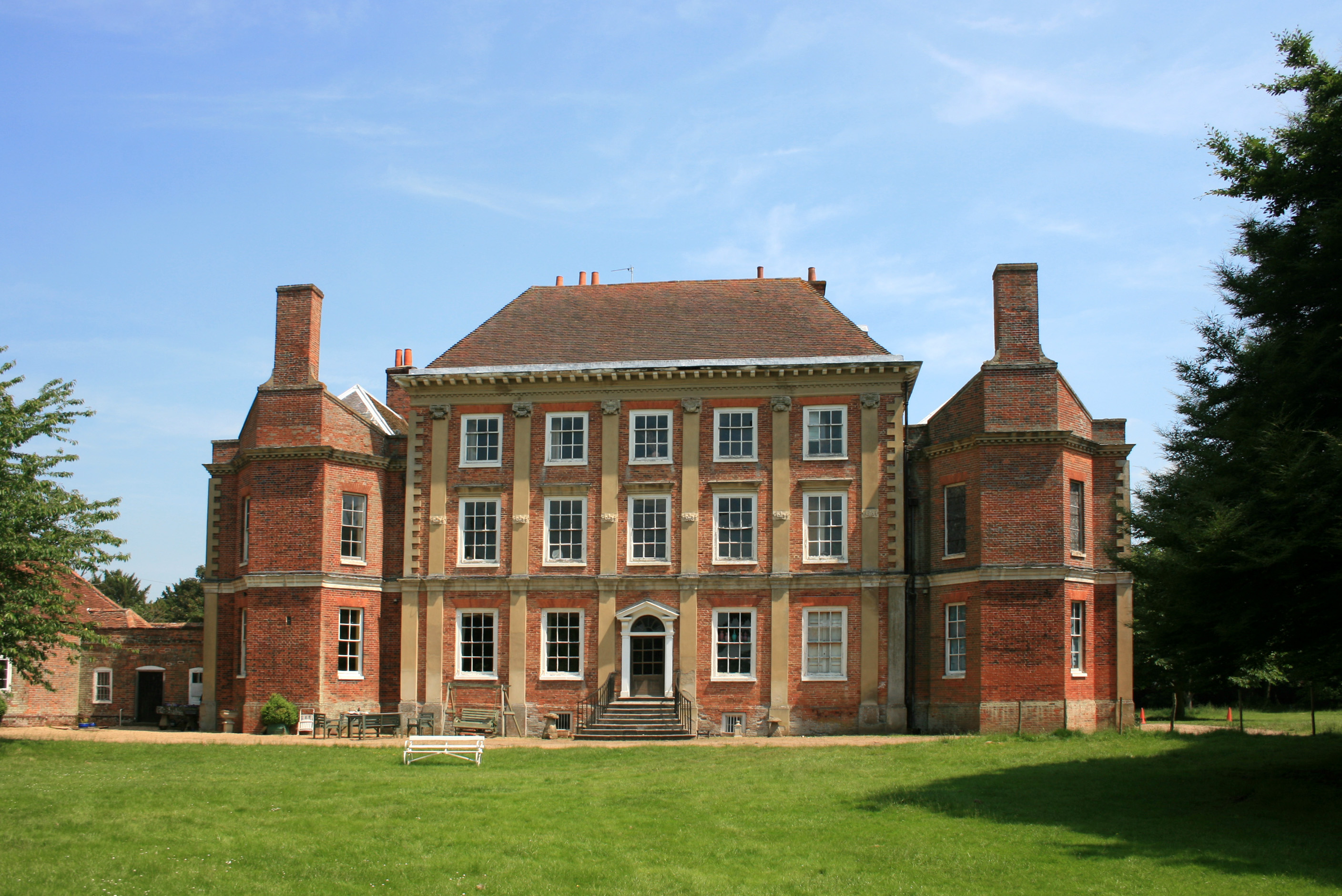
- Milton Manor

- Location within Oxfordshire
- Population: 1,290 (2011 Census)
- OS grid reference: SU4892
- Civil parish: Milton
- District: Vale of White Horse
- Shire county: Oxfordshire
- Region: South East
- Country: England
- Sovereign state: United Kingdom
- Post town: Abingdon
- Postcode district: OX14
- Dialling code: 01235
- Police: Thames Valley
- Fire: Oxfordshire
- Ambulance: South Central
- UK Parliament: Didcot and Wantage
- Website: Parish of Milton

Milton is a village and civil parish about 3 miles (5 km) west of Didcot and a similar distance south of Abingdon. The 2011 Census recorded the parish's population as 1,290.

== Toponymy ==
From the 10th to the 13th century the village's name was Middeltune. From the 13th to the 15th century it evolved as Middelton and Midelton, and from the 15th century to the 17th century it was Mylton.

== Archaeology ==
On land near Sutton Road, northeast of the village, is the site of an Anglo-Saxon cemetery. Archaeologists had investigated the western part of the cemetery by the early 1930s. In 2014 what appeared to be the easternmost part of the cemetery was found and more than 40 human burials were excavated. Few grave goods were found, apart from two metal knives and another metal object too corroded to be identified.

== Manor ==
In 956 King Eadwig granted 15 hides of land at Milton to his thegn Alfwin, who in turn gave the estate to the Benedictine Abingdon Abbey. In the Dissolution of the Monasteries in the 1530s the abbey surrendered its lands to the Crown. Milton was among a number of estates that Henry VIII granted to Baron Wriothesley in 1546. Wriothesley sold Milton that same year to Thomas Calton, a goldsmith of London, whose descendants retained it for the next 218 years.

In 1709 Paul Calton married Catherine, daughter of Admiral John Benbow. In 1764 Catherine, Martha and Mary Calton sold the estate to Bryant Barrett, in whose family the property remains. Bryant Barrett was a Roman Catholic, so, by English law, could not own property. He and his brother Isaac agreed that the latter should buy the house and estate on Bryant's behalf for £10,600.

Milton Manor House is a yellow and red brick manor house built for the Calton family in the 17th century. The actual date is unknown: in 1696 it was described as "newly built" but Sir Nikolaus Pevsner believed that it could not be much later than the 1660s. The original building is of five bays and three storeys and may have been designed by Inigo Jones. In 1772 short two-storey wings designed by Stephen Wright were added to the house for Bryant Barrett. The house is a Grade I listed building.

There was also a dower house, where Admiral Benbow lived in the 1690s. Tsar Peter the Great of Russia is said to have stayed at Milton House around this time, probably in order to consult Benbow on shipbuilding. No trace of the dower house remains. The manor house, gardens and park are open to the public between 2pm and 5pm on certain dates between Easter Day and 31 August each year.

== Churches ==
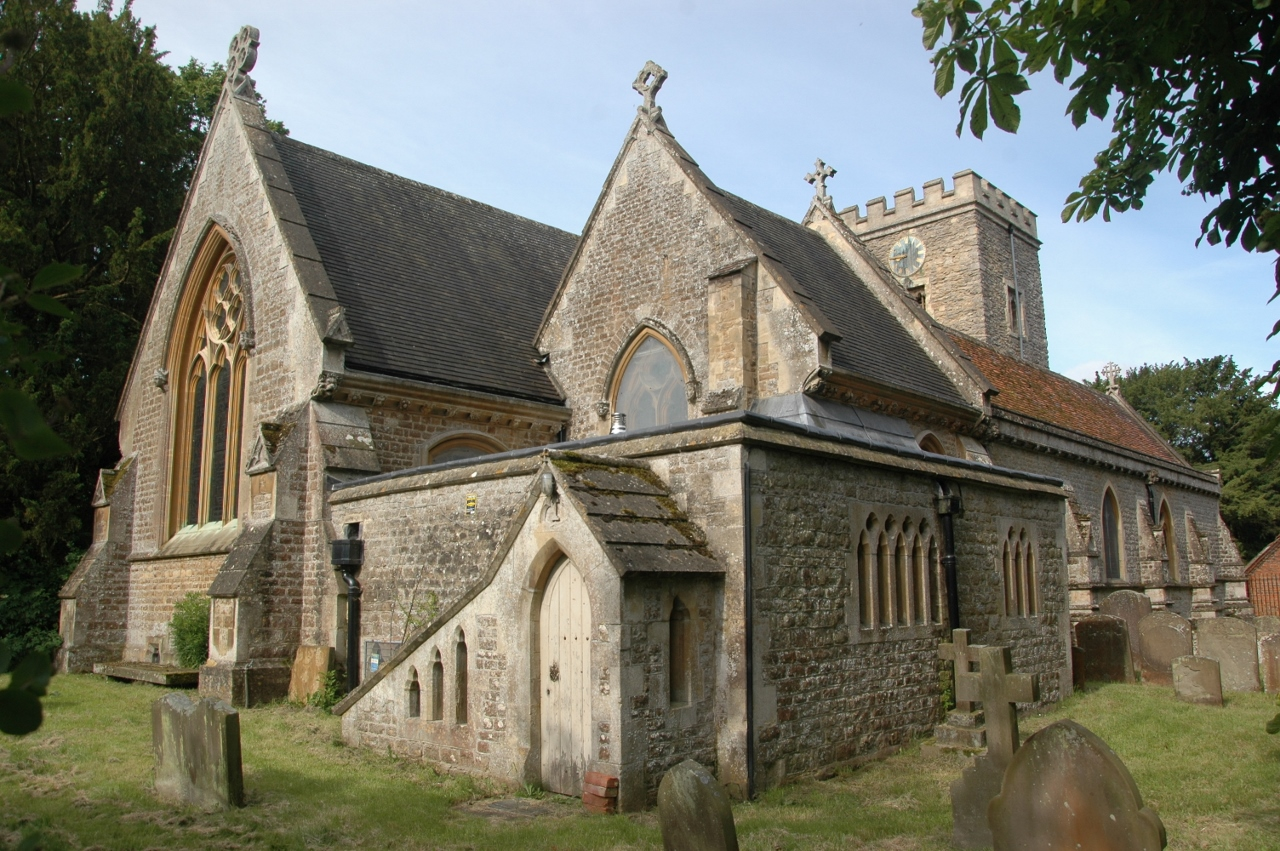
St Blaise's parish church

=== Church of England ===
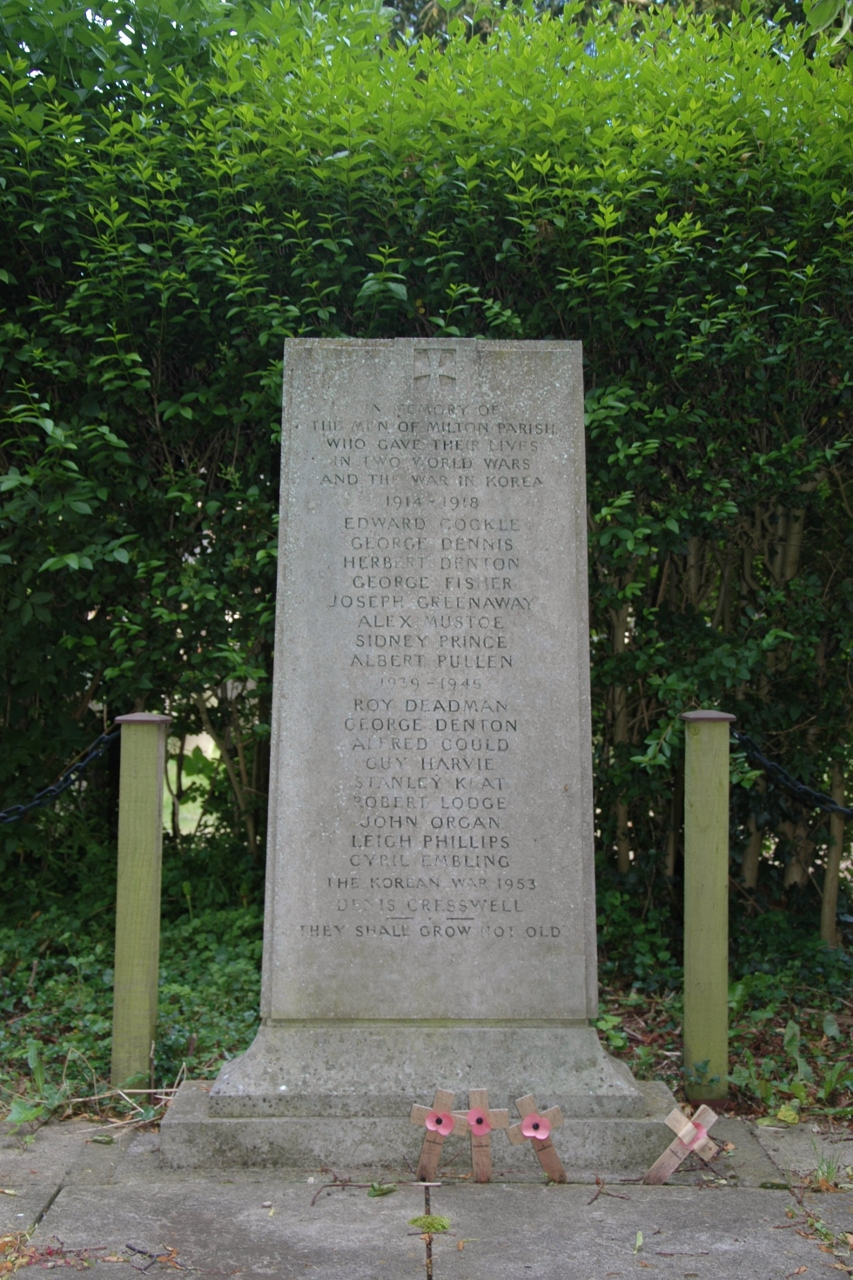
War memorial in High St

The Church of England parish church is dedicated to Saint Blaise as he is the patron saint of the wool trade, which was a major part of Milton's medieval economy. The church seems to have been built in the 14th century but only the porch, the lower part of the bell tower and part of the nave including the west window survive from this time. The upper part of the tower was rebuilt in the 18th century and the nave, chancel and four-bay north aisle were rebuilt by the Gothic Revival architect Henry Woodyer in 1849–51. Under the chancel arch is the Barrett family vault, in which the Roman Catholic bishop Richard Challoner (1691–1781) was buried until 1946 when his remains were translated to Westminster Cathedral. The church is a Grade II* listed building.

The tower has a ring of eight bells, all cast by Whitechapel Bell Foundry in 2001. Previously there was a ring of six, four of which were cast in 1682. At least three of the 1682 bells were cast by Richard Keene, who had foundries at Woodstock, Oxfordshire and Royston, Hertfordshire. Another of the bells had been cast in 1787 and the tenor was cast by Mears and Stainbank of the Whitechapel Bell Foundry in 1906. When the new bells were hung in 2001, five of the old bells were sold to St Michael and All Angels' parish church, Hackthorn, Lincolnshire. One of Richard Keene's 1682 bells has been retained at St Blaise but is not used.

=== Methodist ===
By 1924 Milton had a nonconformist corrugated iron chapel. Milton Methodist church now has a modern brick building and is a member of the Wantage and Abingdon Methodist Circuit.

== Economic and social history ==
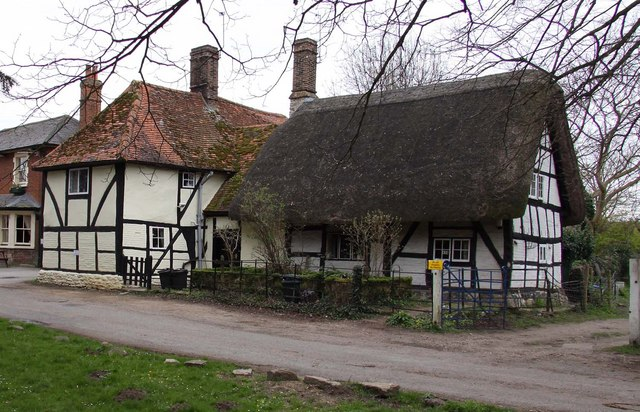
42A and 42B High Street

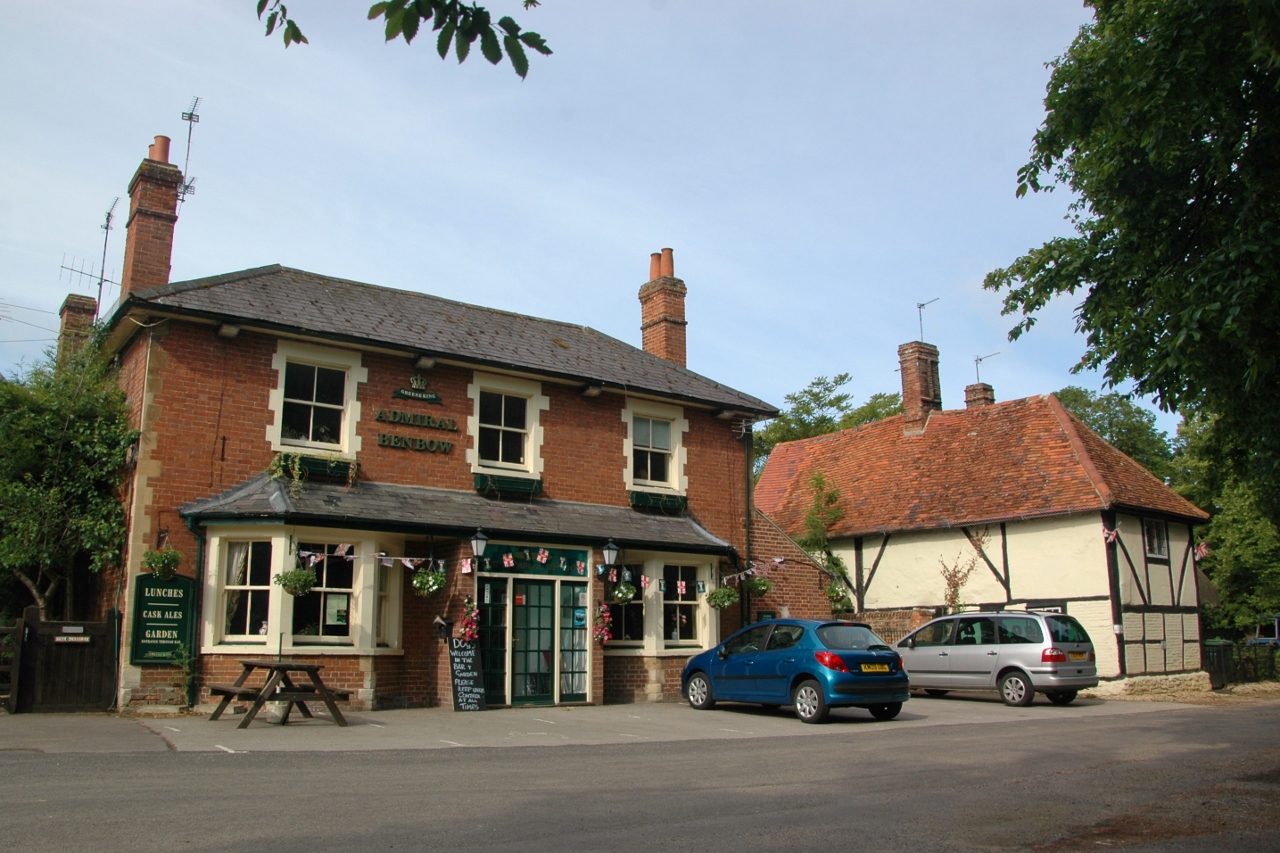
The village pub in 2012, when it was still the Admiral Benbow

Two watermills in the parish are recorded in the Domesday Book of 1086 and again in a record from 1401. There is still a Milton Mill on Ginge Brook. 42A and 42B High Street is an early 14th-century timber-framed cruck cottage, extended in the 15th century. It is a Grade II* listed building. Milton Church of England primary school was founded in 1796. In about 1770 Thomas Bowles of Abingdon inclosed land on Milton Hill about 1 1/2 miles (2.4 km) south of the village as a park and had Milton Hill House built there. His son Thomas (died 1837) enlarged both the park and the house. The library was designed by Sir George Gilbert Scott for John Samuel Bowles. It remained the Bowles family seat until 1905 when it was sold by Col. Thomas John Bowles. It is now a DeVere hotel. An open field system of farming continued in the parish until 1808–09, when Parliament passed an inclosure act for Milton.

In 1841 the Great Western Main Line was built through the parish about 1/2 mile (800 m) south of the village. In 1955 a British Railways excursion train was derailed at Milton, killing 11 people and injuring 163. During the Second World War the British Army had a large depot on land between Milton village and the railway line. The site is now Milton Park business park. In the 1970s a new dual carriageway was built through the parish as part of the realignment and enlargement of the A34 road. Milton Interchange was built just south of the railway line as a junction between the A34 and the A4130.

== Amenities ==
Milton has one public house, which for many decades was called the Admiral Benbow, and latterly it was controlled by Greene King Brewery. It is now renamed The Plum Pudding.

== Sport and leisure ==
Milton has a Non-League football club, Milton United F.C., whose home ground is at Potash Lane.

== Sources ==
- Coddington, Hugh; Oram, Richard; Lisk, Susan (2015). "Land off Sutton Road, Milton". Oxoniensia. LXXX. Oxford: Oxfordshire Architectural and Historical Society: 215. ISSN 0308-5562.
- Page, W.H.; Ditchfield, P.H., eds. (1924). A History of the County of Berkshire. Victoria County History. Vol. 4. assisted by John Hautenville Cope. London: The St Katherine Press. pp. 361–365.
- Peake, HJE (1931). The Archaeology of Berkshire. The County Archaeologies. London: Methuen & Co. pp. 134, 212.
- Pevsner, Nikolaus (1966). Berkshire. The Buildings of England. Harmondsworth: Penguin Books. pp. 178–179.
