= HAZMAT Class 7 Radioactive substances =

Radioactive substances are materials that emit radiation.

== Divisions ==
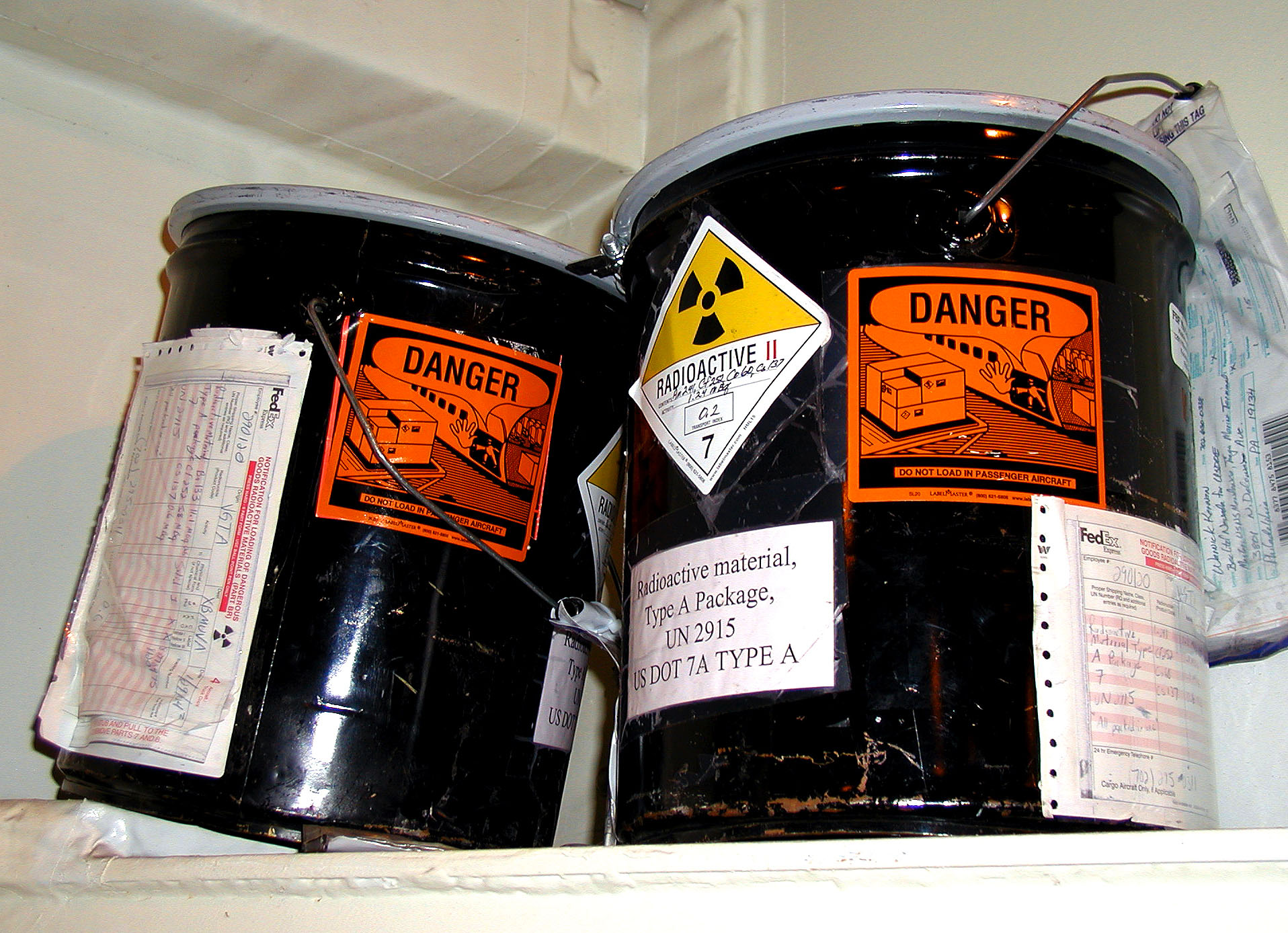
Radioactive label on containers aboard a US Navy ship.

Any quantity of packages bearing the RADIOACTIVE YELLOW III label (LSA-III).

Some radioactive materials in "exclusive use" with low specific activity radioactive materials will not bear the label, however, the RADIOACTIVE placard is required.

== Placards ==
Hazardous Materials
Class 7: Radioactive

== Compatibility Table ==
Load and Segregation Chart
	Weight		1.1	1.2	1.3	1.4	1.5	1.6	2.1	2.2	2.2	2.3		3	4.1	4.2	4.3	5.1	5.2	6.1	7	8
	Weight		1.1	1.2	1.3	1.4	1.5	1.6	2.1	2.2	2.2	A	B	3	4.1	4.2	4.3	5.1	5.2	A	7	8
7 - I	N/A	B																				
7 - II	N/A	B																				
7 - III	Any Quantity	B	No	No			No		O													
Key
The absence of any hazard class or division or a blank space in the table indicates that no restrictions apply.: X: These materials may not be loaded, transported, or stored together in the same transport vehicle or storage facility during the course of transportation.; O: Indicates that these materials may not be loaded, transported or stored together in the same transport vehicle or storage facility during the course of transportation, unless separated in a manner that, in the event of leakage from packages under conditions normally incident to transportation, commingling of hazardous materials would not occur.; B: Radioactive I and II are not required to be placarded, and does not have segregation requirements. Radioactive III must be placarded in any quantity.; I - Extremely low radiation levels: 0.5 millirems (0.0050 mSv) per hour.; II - Low radiation levels: >0.5–50 millirems (0.0050–0.5000 mSv) per hour, on surface. 1.0 millirem (0.010 mSv) maximum at 3.3 feet (1 m).; III - Higher radiation levels: >50–200 millirems (0.50–2.00 mSv), on surface. 10 millirems (0.10 mSv) maximum at 3.3 feet (1 m).; Source: United States Code of Federal Regulations, Title 49 CFR §177.848 - Segregation of hazardous materials.
