= Rugby Locomotive Testing Station =

British railway testing plant

Coordinates: 52.379236°N 1.243421°W

The Rugby Locomotive Testing Station was a British railway testing plant in Rugby, Warwickshire. Originally envisioned by Sir Nigel Gresley as a joint LMS-LNER operation, construction was started in the late 1930s but then deferred by the war. It was eventually opened in 1948 after both its owners had become constituents of British Railways. The location was one with access to both LMS and LNER main lines (West Coast Main Line and Great Central Main Line) respectively. The GWR meanwhile had their own testing plant at Swindon Works.

There was a rolling road to test engines.

The testing station was relatively short lived; the final test was made in 1965, and the plant was officially closed in 1970, however the building continued to be used until the early-1980s as an outpost of the British Rail Research Division, until it was demolished in 1984. The site is now an industrial estate.

The records of the Rugby LTS are part of the National Railway Collection held by the National Railway Museum.

News reel footage of the site is available on YouTube.
