= Settle rail crash =

Railway crash in England in 1960

Details
- Date: 21 January 1960; 66 years ago 01:48
- Location: Settle
- Coordinates: 54.073°N 2.277°W
- Country: England
- Line: Settle-Carlisle Line
- Cause: Disconnected connecting rod assembly

Statistics
- Trains: 2
- Passengers: 75
- Deaths: 5
- Injured: 8

The Settle rail crash was a railway accident that occurred at Langcliffe near Settle, England, on the night of 21 January 1960 in which two trains collided, killing five people and injuring eight more.

== The accident ==
BR Standard Class 7 No 70052 Firth of Tay was leading the 21:05 eight-carriage express train from Glasgow St Enoch to London St Pancras. On the descent from Ais Gill Summit, the driver heard a repeated knocking which he thought came from the connecting rods where they were connected to the locomotive's drive wheels. He reduced speed and later stopped the train in a gale-force wind while it was snowing at Garsdale, but was unable to find the cause of the noise. He continued south at what he thought was less than 20 miles per hour (32 km/h); however, timings from the signal boxes showed the speed was 40 miles per hour (64 km/h). The fireman on the right of the train then saw sparks from the side of the locomotive as ballast began to be thrown up against the cab. As the driver made a full brake application, a 20-wagon goods train, hauled by LMS Hughes Crab no. 42881, passed in the opposite direction. The freight engine and eight leading wagons derailed, colliding with the side of the express, ripping out the side of the first three carriages and scoring the remainder. Five people were killed and eight more were injured. The accident happened just north of Settle railway station at milepost 237.

== Cause ==
A search of the track along which the express had travelled revealed that between 33 miles (53 km) and 12 miles (19 km) before the accident, it had shed various components of its side assembly. At the point where the driver inspected the locomotive all the parts that were missing had already fallen off, but due to the severity of the weather during this inspection the official report did not attach any blame to the driver for not spotting this, although the report did comment that the driver proceeded afterwards at an unsafe speed. Eventually the entire connecting rod had ploughed into the ballast near the adjacent line; wrecking the track in front of the oncoming goods train. The root cause was the failure of maintenance staff to properly secure the slide bar nuts; a problem which had been reported several times previously on that locomotive and on others in the same class but without fatal consequences. As a result of the inquiry the difficult to access nuts were redesigned.
