= Battle drill =

Infantry training procedure

A battle drill is a type of standard operating procedure used in the training of infantry. Based on commonly encountered scenarios, battle drills are used to establish standardized actions of a team, allowing for a quick collective response without the need for deliberate decision making. Platoons and squads apply fire and maneuver accordingly, requiring leaders to rapidly make decisions and quickly issue brief oral orders. In 1944, Colonel Charles Stacey defined the practice of battle drill as "the reduction of military tactics to bare essentials which are taught to a platoon as a team drill, with clear explanations regarding the objects to be achieved, the principles involved and the individual task of each member of the team."

A US Army publication from 2016 identifies fourteen "essential battle drills that an Infantry platoon and squad must train on to ensure success":

- 1: React to Direct Fire
- 2: Conduct a Platoon Attack
- 2A: Conduct a Squad Assault
- 3: Break Contact
- 4: React to an Ambush
- 5: Knock out a Bunker
- 6: Enter and Clear a Room
- 7: Enter a Trench to Secure a Foothold
- 8: Conduct the Initial Breach of a Mined Wire Obstacle
- 9: React to Indirect Fire
- 10: React to Aircraft while Dismounted
- 11: Establish Security at the Halt
- 12: Conduct a Hasty Attack
- 13: Dismount a Vehicle under Direct Fire
- 14: React to a Chemical Attack
- 15: React to a Chemical Agent Attack

== See also ==
- Military strategy
