= BR Standard Class 7 70000 Britannia =

Preserved 4-6-2 British steam locomotive

BR 70000 Britannia
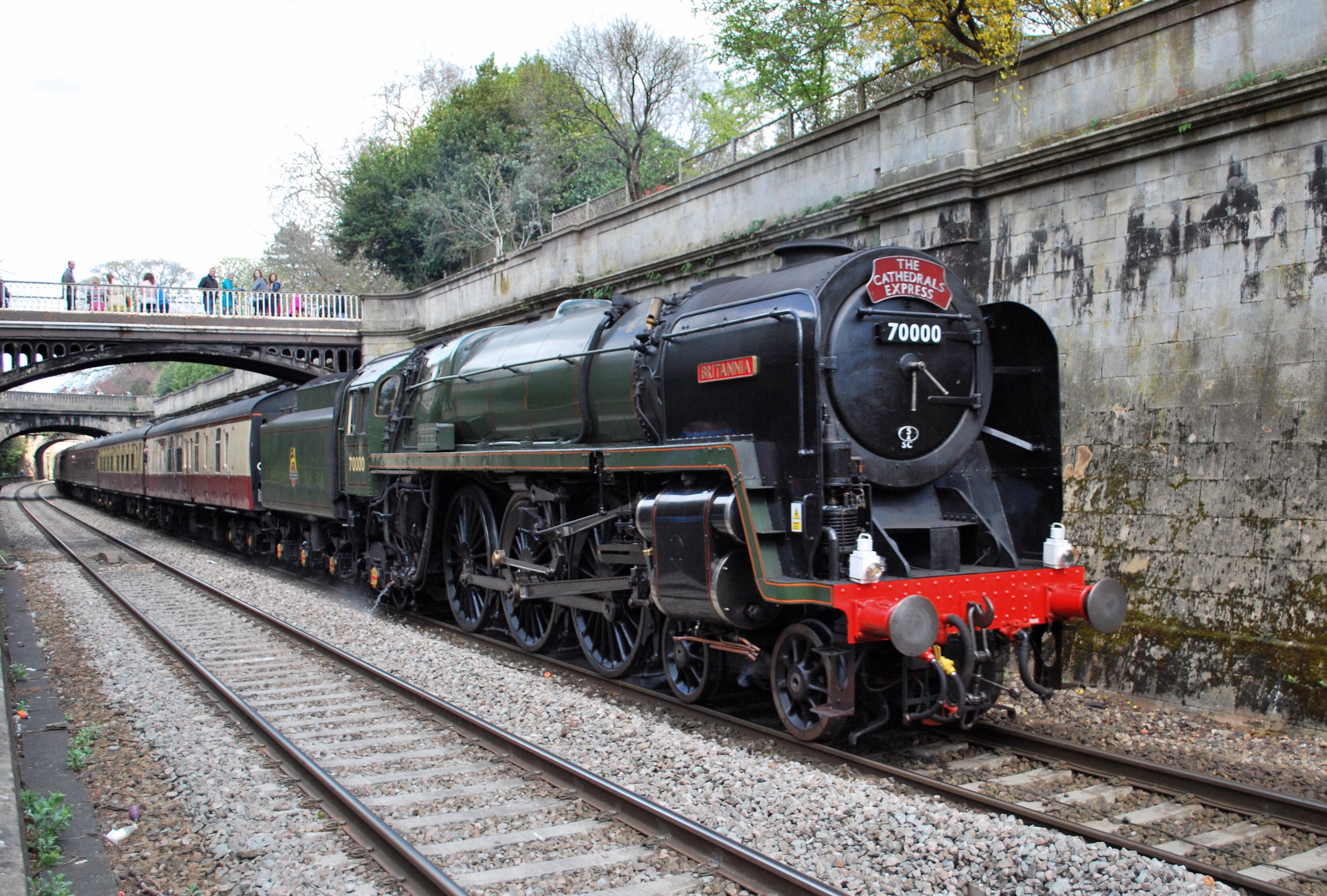
- Britannia approaching Bath, while on the Cathedrals Express railtour in 2012
Type and origin
- Power type: Steam
- Builder: British Railways Crewe works
- Build date: 2 January 1951
Specifications
- Configuration
  - Whyte: 4-6-2
  - UIC: 2′C1′h2
- Gauge: 4 ft 8 1/2 in (1,435 mm) standard gauge
- Driver dia.: 6 ft 2 in (1.880 m)
- Trailing dia.: 3 ft 3 1/2 in (1.003 m)
- Length: 68 ft 9 in (20.96 m)
- Width: 8 ft 8 3/4 in (2.66 m)
- Height: 13 ft 0 1/2 in (3.98 m)7004
- Axle load: 20.50 long tons (20.83 t; 22.96 short tons)
- Adhesive weight: 61.50 long tons (62.49 t; 68.88 short tons)
- Loco weight: 94.00 long tons (95.51 t; 105.28 short tons)
- Tender weight: 49.15 long tons (49.94 t; 55.05 short tons)
- Tender type: BR1
- Fuel type: coal
- Fuel capacity: 7.0 long tons (7.1 t; 7.8 short tons)
- Water cap.: 4,250 imp gal (19,300 L; 5,100 US gal)
- Firebox
  - Grate area: 42 sq ft (3.9 m^{2})
- Boiler: BR1
- Boiler pressure: 250 psi (1.72 MPa)
- Heating surface
  - Firebox: 210 sq ft (20 m^{2})
  - Tubes and flues: 2,264 sq ft (210.3 m^{2})
- Superheater
  - Heating area: 718 sq ft (66.7 m^{2})
- Cylinders: Two, outside
- Cylinder size: 20 in × 28 in (508 mm × 711 mm)
Performance figures
- Tractive effort: 32,150 lbf (143.0 kN)
- Factor of adh.: 4.23
Career
- Operators: British Railways
- Class: Standard Class 7
- Power class: 7MT
- Number in class: 1st of 55
- Numbers: 70000
- Official name: Britannia
- Retired: May 1966
- Current owner: Royal Scot Locomotive and General Trust
- Disposition: Preserved

British Railways Standard Class 7 'Britannia Class' No. 70000 Britannia is a preserved steam locomotive, owned by the Royal Scot Locomotive and General Trust.

== British Railways ==
Britannia was built at Crewe, completed on 2 January 1951. It was the first British Railways standard locomotive to be built and the first of 55 locomotives of the Britannia class. The locomotive was named at a ceremony at Marylebone Station by the then Minister for Transport Alfred Barnes on 30 January 1951.

The BR Locomotive Naming Committee were determined not to use names already in use on other locomotives. They tried to observe this by not selecting the name Britannia for use on 70000 because it was already in use on one of the ex-LMS Jubilee Class locomotives, specifically No. 45700 but Robert Riddles overruled them and the Jubilee had to be renamed to Amethyst.

Britannia was initially based at Stratford (30A) in order to work East Anglian expresses to Norwich and Great Yarmouth, but was also particularly associated with the Hook Continental boat train to Harwich. Subsequently, the loco was based at Norwich Thorpe (w/e 31 January 1959) and March (June 1961) before spending the remainder of its career on the London Midland Region: Willesden (1A) (w/e 30 March 1963), Crewe North (5A) (w/e 25 May 1963), Crewe South (5B) (w/e 19 May 1965) and finally Newton Heath (9D) (w/e 5 March 1966) from where it was withdrawn w/e 28 May 1966.

The locomotive pulled the funeral train of King George VI from King's Lynn, Norfolk to London following his death in February 1952 at Sandringham House, Norfolk. For this task, Britannia had its cab roof painted white, as was the custom with royal locomotives (B2 61617 Ford Castle, which pulled the train from Wolferton Station to King's Lynn, was similarly liveried). Britannia has also worn the white roof in preservation.

Britannia was withdrawn in May 1966, after 15 years of service.

== Preservation ==
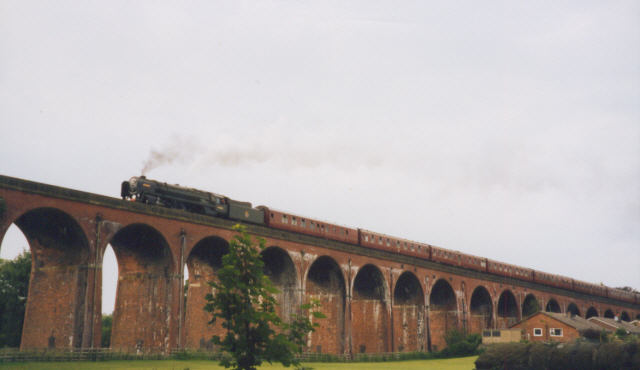
Britannia on a charter train on Whalley Viaduct in 1994

Initially destined for the National Railway Museum because of its cultural significance, it was stored. However, due to her prototype design and construction differences, the NRM chose standard sibling 70013 Oliver Cromwell, instead. Britannia was eventually bought by Britannia Locomotive Company Ltd.

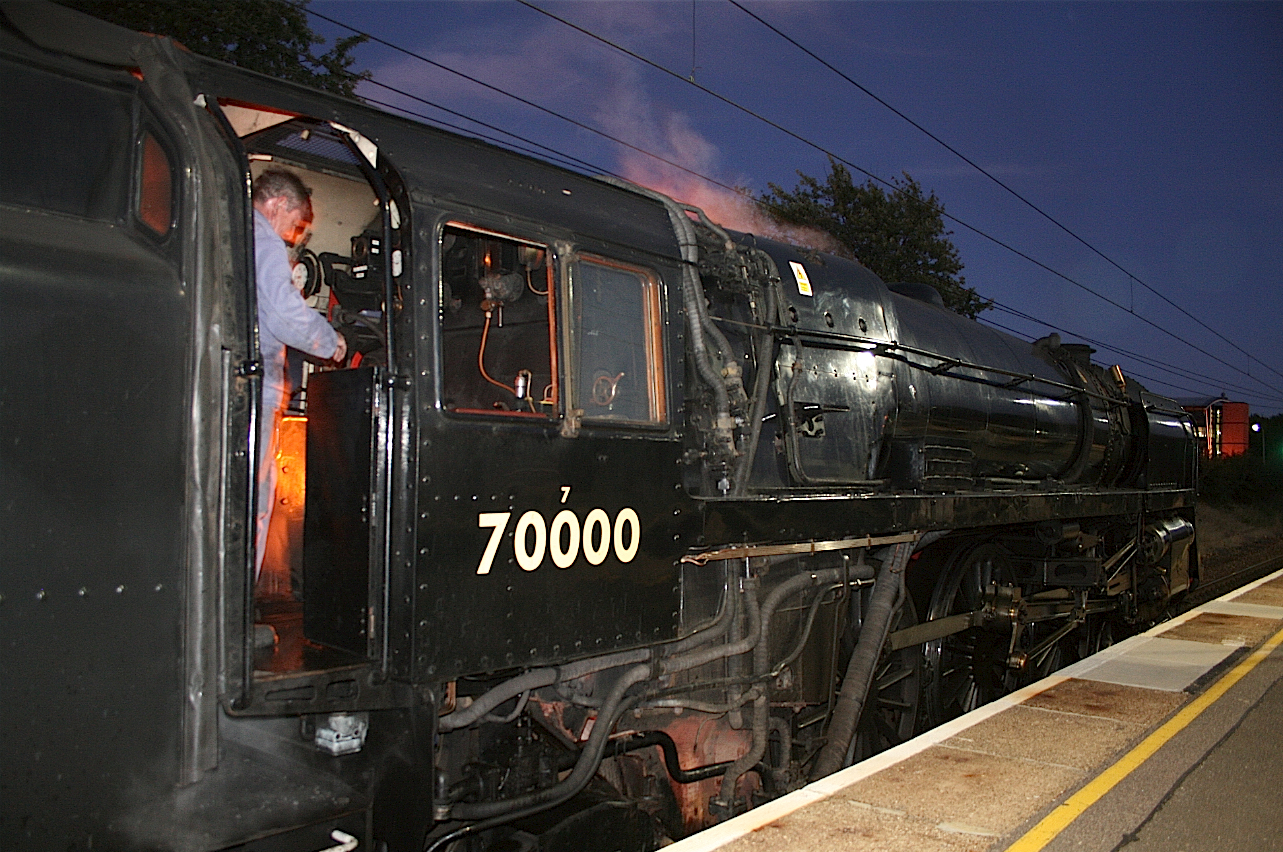
Britannia's cab, Stevenage, 2011

After a series of moves, she arrived on the Severn Valley Railway in April 1971 for restoration to working order. The locomotive was first steamed in May 1978 and was ceremonially renamed by Robert Riddles in the same month. However she was little used on the SVR due to the axle weight being too heavy for the railway at that time. With the society wishing to make more use of the locomotive, she was moved to the European gauge Nene Valley Railway in Peterborough, where she was also fitted with an air-brake compressor, and was based there from 1980 to 2000. Britannia made her return to the main line on 27 July 1991, successfully working enthusiast trips until 1997, and was featured in an episode of London's Burning.

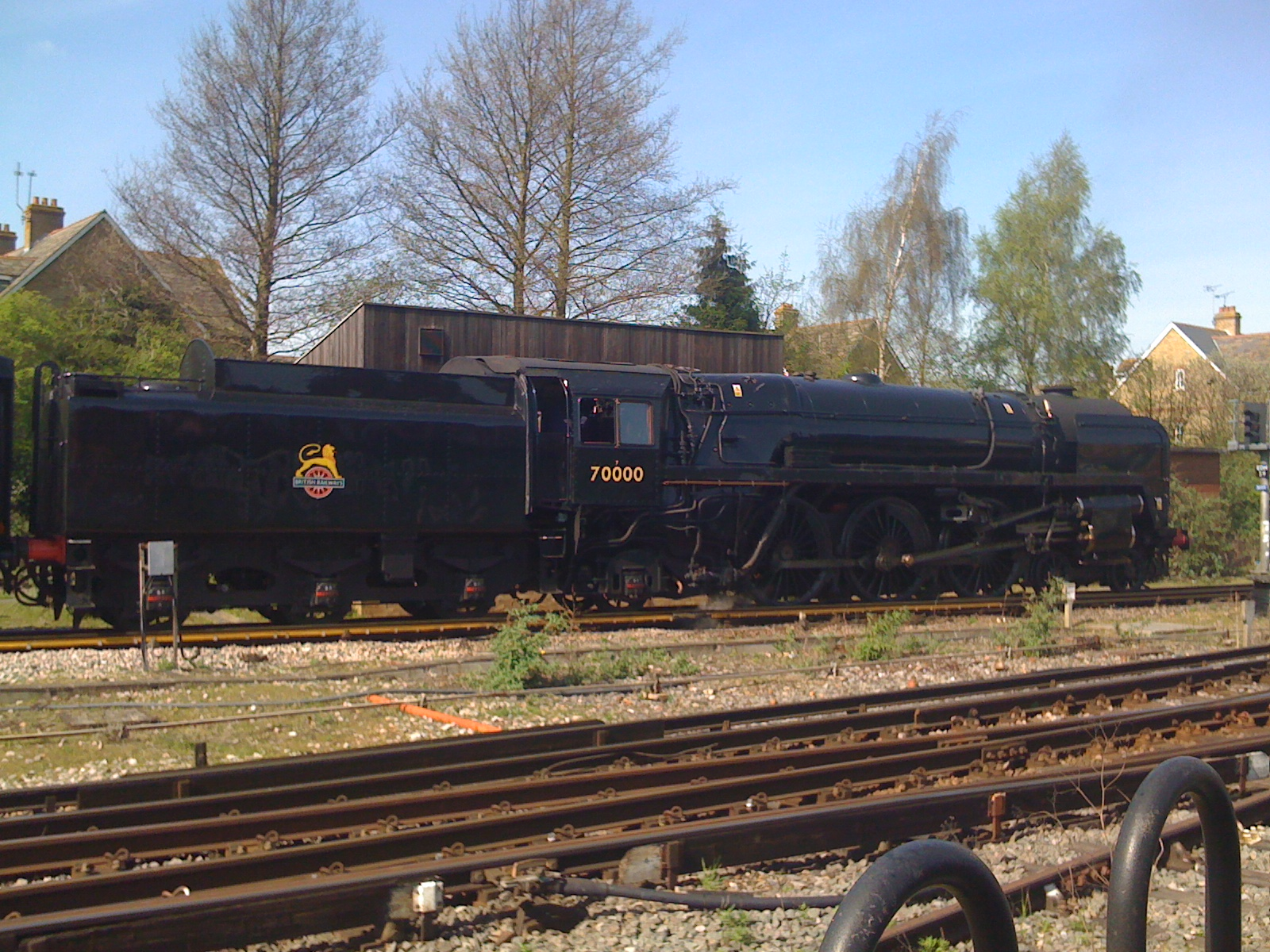
Britannia at Canterbury West, April 2011.

With an expired mainline boiler certificate, due to the high cost of refurbishment, the locomotive was sold to Pete Waterman in 2000. Stored at Waterman's workshops at the Crewe Heritage Centre, after initial assessment the amount of work resulted in Waterman selling her to Jeremy Hosking. The locomotive underwent restoration at Crewe which involved a newly refurbished cab, a new smoke box and major work on the boiler; replacement steel sides, new crown stays, new front section barrel section, new steel and copper tubeplate, repairs and patches to door plate and major work to copper firebox.

Transferred to the Royal Scot Locomotive and General Trust (RSL&GT), the locomotive was returned to main line operational condition in 2011, initially out shopped in its prototype black British Railways livery (where it did not have nameplates fitted, as was thus known by railway convention as 70000). After a running-in period, in 2012 the locomotive was repainted in British Railways Brunswick Green, but with an early BR crest (unlike her sister 70013 Oliver Cromwell which carries BR's Late Crest). On 24 January 2012, the loco hauled the Royal Train with Prince Charles on board to Wakefield Kirkgate, where he rededicated the locomotive. For the trip the loco again had a painted white cab roof, removed after the engine's appearance at the West Somerset Railway's Spring Gala.

Following repairs in 2018 after a vibration problem was discovered in 2015, the engine was moved to the Severn Valley Railway which included an appearance at the railway's autumn steam gala. Following the gala the engine was returned to Crewe and following a mainline test run the engine was given a repaint of its BR green which included replacement of the early crest for the later version.

On 22 August 2023, while hauling a Steam Dreams circular tour around the Surrey Hills. Shortly after passing through Chilworth, 70000 suffered a catastrophic failure of its right side crosshead which fractured into two pieces. Following isolation of the third rail and a block being placed on the running lines, an inspection on the severity of the damage was made. Under darkness the main right side connecting rod had to be removed and then 70000 was towed behind a diesel and its train back to London Victoria via Guildford. Following further assessment for damage 70000 was taken back to Crewe by road for repairs to be undertaken.
