= LMS Stanier Class 5 4-6-0 5212 =

Preserved British steam locomotive

LMS 5212
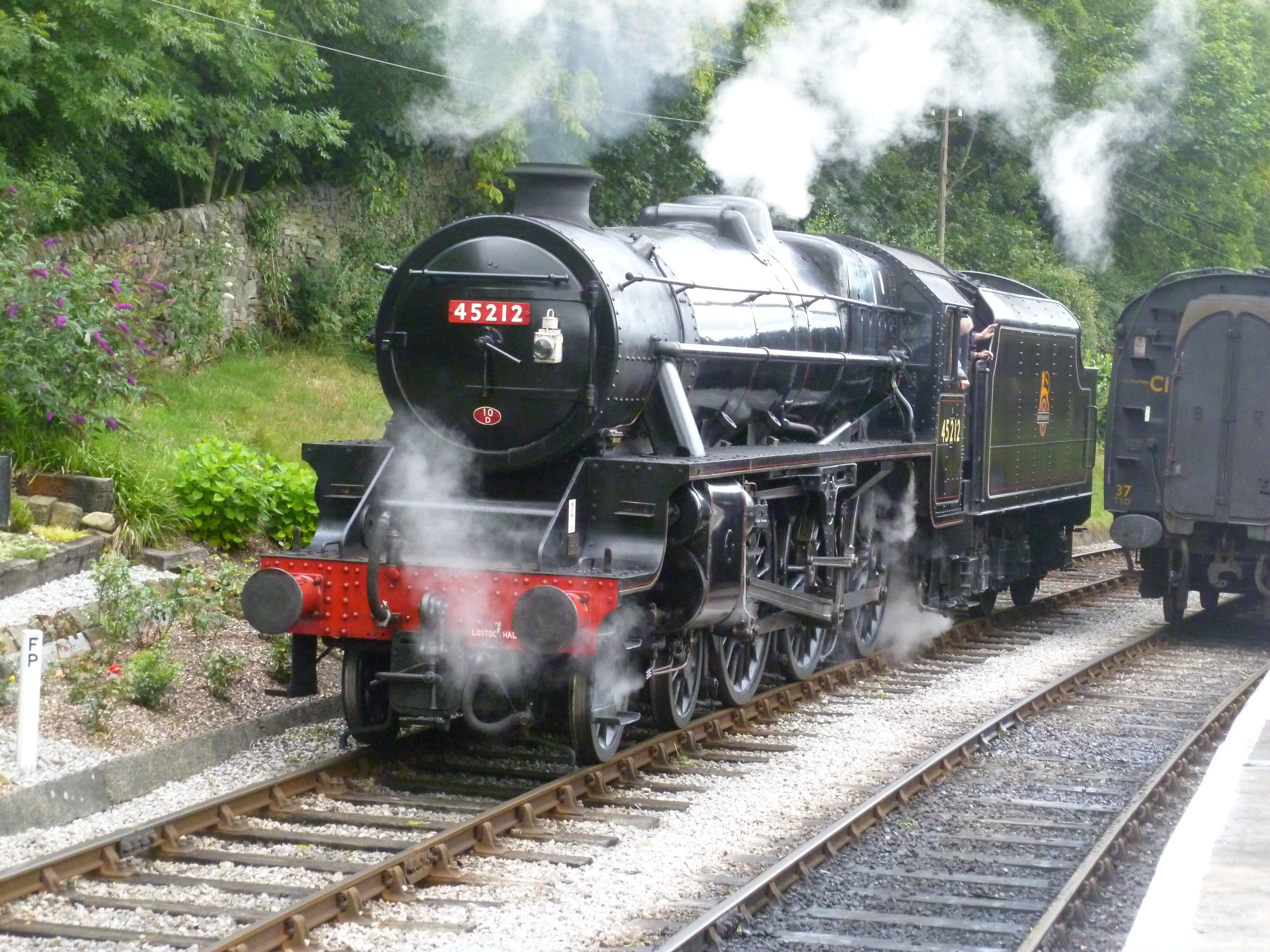
- 45212 Running round its train at Oxenhope.
Type and origin
- Power type: Steam
- Designer: William Stanier
- Builder: Armstrong Whitworth
- Serial number: 1253
- Build date: November 1935
Specifications
- Configuration
  - Whyte: 4-6-0
- Gauge: 4 ft 8 1/2 in (1,435 mm)
- Leading dia.: 3 ft 3 1/2 in (1.003 m)
- Driver dia.: 6 ft 0 in (1.829 m)
- Length: 63 ft 7 3/4 in (19.40 m)
- Fuel type: Coal
- Fuel capacity: 9 long tons (9.1 t; 10.1 short tons)
- Water cap.: 4,000 imp gal (18,000 L; 4,800 US gal)
- Firebox
  - Grate area: 28 1/2 sq ft (2.65 m^{2})
- Boiler: LMS type 3C
- Boiler pressure: 225 lbf/in^{2} (1.55 MPa)
- Cylinders: Two, outside
- Cylinder size: 18 1/2 in × 28 in (470 mm × 711 mm)
- Valve gear: Walschaerts
- Valve type: Piston valves
- Loco brake: Vacuum
- Safety systems: AWS, TPWS, OTMR, GSMR
Performance figures
- Maximum speed: 25mph - (heritage railways) 45mph - (mainline, tender first) 60mph - (mainline, chimney first)
- Tractive effort: 25,455 lbf (113.23 kN)
Career
- Operators: London, Midland and Scottish Railway; → British Railways
- Power class: LMS: 5P5F; BR: 5MT
- Axle load class: BR: Route Availability 7
- Withdrawn: 3 August 1968
- Current owner: KWVR (On loan to Ian Riley)
- Disposition: Operational, Mainline Certified

LMS Stanier Class 5 4-6-0 No. 45212 is a preserved British steam locomotive. It was built by Armstrong Whitworth at Newcastle upon Tyne in 1935.

== Service history ==
It is a LMS Stanier Class 5 4-6-0 locomotive, originally numbered 5212 by the LMS, it had 40000 added to its number under British Railways after nationalisation in 1948. 45212 was one of the last locomotives to be withdrawn from service, surviving until 1968, the last year of steam on British Railways. On 4 August 1968, it hauled the last regular steam powered service on British Railways.

Shed allocations
Location	Shed code	From
Bradford Low Moor	25F	November 1935
Fleetwood	24F	29 November 1947
Carnforth	10A	3 October 1964
Speke Junction	8C	13 March 1965
Carnforth	10A	10 July 1965
Carlisle Kingmoor	12A	9 October 1965
Lostock Hall	10D	6 January 1968

== Preservation ==
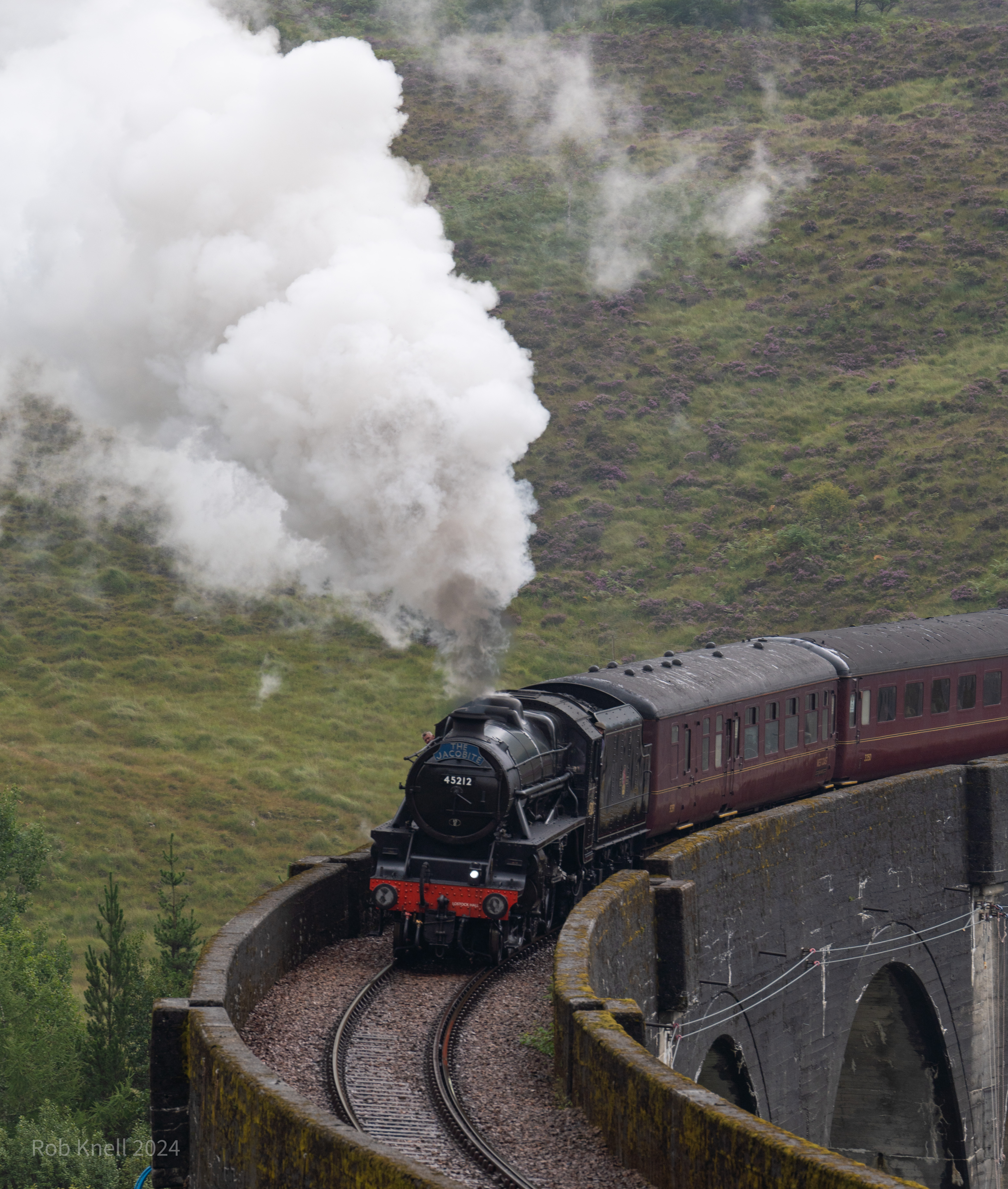
No. 45212 crossing the Glenfinnan viaduct as part of the Jacobite service, 2024.

In August 1968, Ron Ainsworth purchased 45212 directly from British Railways service for use on the Keighley & Worth Valley Railway, so it never had to be restored from scrapyard condition, and is now owned by the Keighley & Worth Valley Railway. Between 2000 and 2011, it was overhauled and operated at the North Yorkshire Moors Railway.

In 2012 an agreement was reached with Ian Riley for a 10 year period where the locomotive would be overhauled to mainline standards, while spending 3 months of the year at the Keighley & Worth Valley Railway. Following the 2016 completion of an overhaul at Riley's workshop in Bury, the engine was mainline certified, and was operated by them on the main line, alongside Black 5s 44871 and 45407.

In 2017, the engine began running on the Jacobite service from Fort William to Mallaig on the West Highland Line.

In 2026, following the expiry of its boiler ticket (necessitating another overhaul), the locomotive was returned to the Keighley & Worth Valley Railway pending a decision on its future.
