= LMS Stanier Class 5 4-6-0 =

British class of steam locomotives

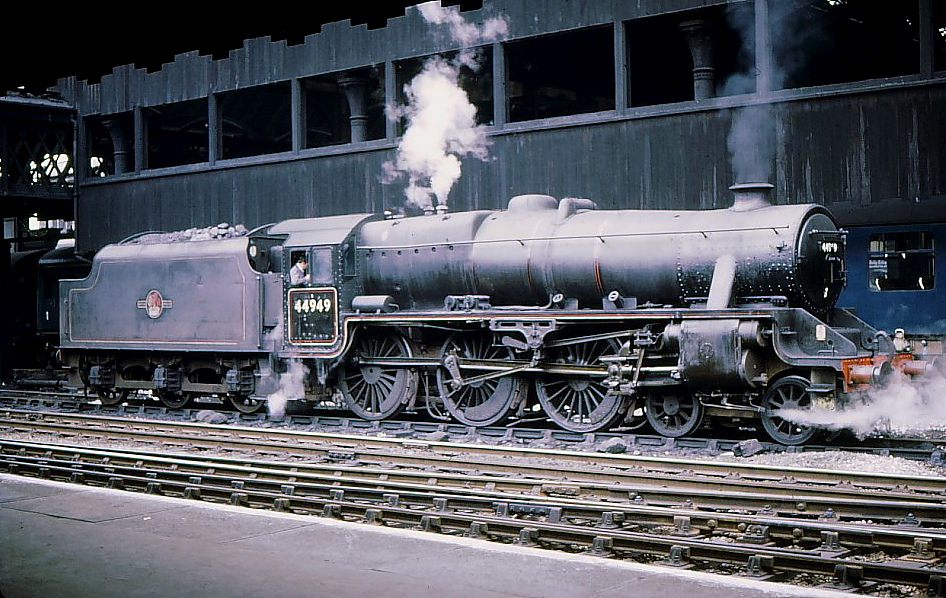
- No. 44949 at Manchester Victoria in 1968.
Type and origin
- Power type: Steam
- Designer: William Stanier
- Builder: LMS Crewe Works (241); LMS Derby Works (54); LMS Horwich Works (120); Vulcan Foundry (100); Armstrong Whitworth (327)
- Serial number: AW: 1166–1265, 1280–1506; VF: 4565–4614, 4618–4667
- Build date: 1934–1951
- Total produced: 842
Specifications
- Configuration
  - Whyte: 4-6-0
  - UIC: 2′C h2
- Gauge: 4 ft 8 1/2 in (1,435 mm)
- Leading dia.: 3 ft 3 1/2 in (1.003 m)
- Driver dia.: 6 ft 0 in (1.829 m)
- Length: 63 ft 7 3/4 in (19.40 m) or 63 ft 11 3/4 in (19.50 m)
- Loco weight: 72.1 long tons (73.3 t; 80.8 short tons) to 75 long tons (76 t; 84 short tons)
- Tender weight: 53.7 long tons (60.1 short tons; 54.6 t)
- Fuel type: Coal
- Fuel capacity: 9 long tons (9.1 t; 10 short tons)
- Water cap.: 4,000 imp gal (18,000 L; 4,800 US gal)
- Firebox
  - Type: Belpaire
  - Grate area: 27 3/4 or 28 1/2 sq ft (2.58 or 2.65 m^{2}) or 28.5 sq ft (2.65 m^{2})
- Boiler: LMS type 3B
- Boiler pressure: 225 lbf/in^{2} (1.55 MPa) superheated
- Heating surface
  - Firebox: 156 or 171 sq ft (14.5 or 15.9 m^{2})
  - Tubes and flues: 1,426 to 1,479 sq ft (132.5 to 137.4 m^{2})
- Superheater
  - Heating area: 228 to 365 sq ft (21.2 to 33.9 m^{2})
- Cylinders: Two, outside
- Cylinder size: 18 1/2 in × 28 in (470 mm × 711 mm)
- Valve gear: Most Walschaerts; Several fitted with Caprotti; one fitted with outside Stephenson
Performance figures
- Tractive effort: 25,455 lbf (113.23 kN)
Career
- Operators: LMS, BR
- Power class: LMS: 5P5F; BR: 5MT
- Axle load class: BR: Route Availability 7
- Withdrawn: 1961–1968
- Disposition: 18 preserved, remainder scrapped

The London, Midland and Scottish Railway (LMS) Stanier Class 5 4-6-0, commonly known as the Black Five, is a class of 4-6-0 steam locomotives. It was introduced by William Stanier and built between 1934 and 1951. A total of 842 were built, initially numbered 4658-5499 then renumbered 44658–45499 by BR. Several members of the class survived to the last day of steam on British Railways in 1968, and eighteen are preserved.

== Origins ==
The Black Five was a mixed-traffic locomotive, a "do-anything go-anywhere" type, designed by Stanier, who had previously been with the GWR. In his early LMS days, he designed his Stanier Mogul 2-6-0, experimenting with the GWR school of thought on locomotive design. A number of details in this design he would never use again, realising the superiority of details not used on the GWR. Stanier realised that there was a need for larger locomotives. These were to be the LMS version of the GWR Halls, but they were not direct copies, as the Hall was too wide to run in most places in Britain. They shared a similar cylinder arrangement (two outside), internal boiler design and size and 6 ft (1.8 m) diameter driving wheels.

In their early days the locomotives were known as the "Black Staniers" from their black livery, in contrast to Stanier's other class of 4-6-0, the LMS Jubilee Class, which were painted crimson (and known until April 1935 as the "Red Staniers"). Later on, the nickname of the former became "Black Five", the number referring to the power classification. This was originally 5P5F, but from 1940 was shown on cabsides as the simple figure 5. A total of 842 were constructed over 17 years. The locomotives were well-liked by their crews for their versatility. One of them was recorded reaching a speed of 96 mph (154 km/h) in service.

== Construction ==
There were a number of detail variations in the locomotives and they did not all remain in the same condition as built. Some locomotives built under British Railways administration were used as test beds for various design modifications, with a view to incorporating the successful modifications in the Standard Classes of locomotives built from 1951 onwards. These modifications included outside Caprotti valve gear, roller bearings (both Timken and Skefco types) on the coupled and tender axles in varying combinations, and an experimental steel firebox. Other locomotives had modified draughting to "self clean" the smokebox (thereby reducing turn-around and disposal times and eliminating or mitigating one of the most unpopular jobs).

=== The domeless engines ===
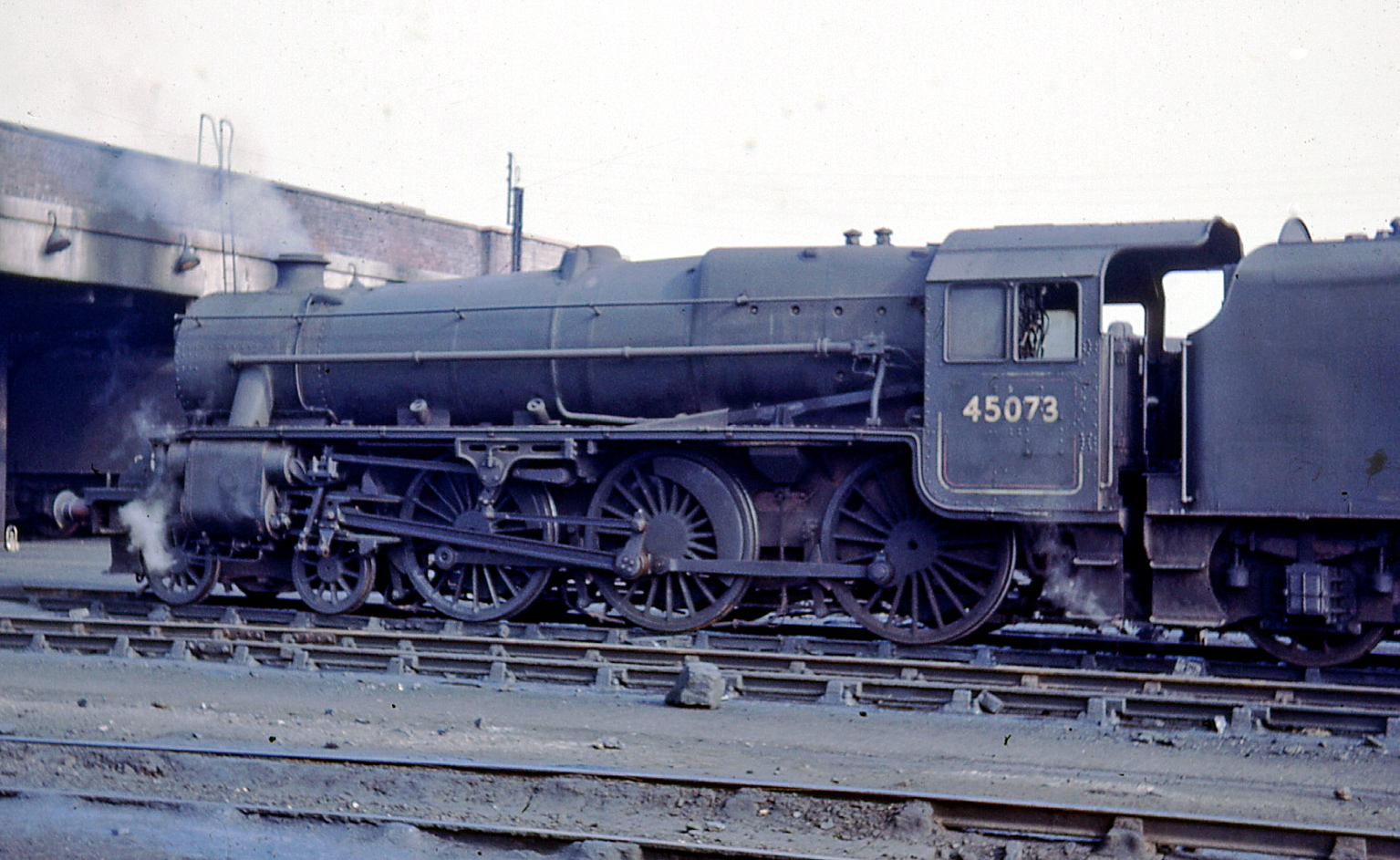
45073 at Rose Grove shed, spring 1968. Although it has a domeless boiler, the casing over the top feed is often mistaken for a dome

Numbering started from 5000, with the first twenty being ordered from Crewe Works in April 1934, and a further fifty (5020–5069) ordered from the Vulcan Foundry in 1933. The first of the Vulcan Foundry engines entered service in 1934, and the entire order of 50 was delivered before the first Crewe-built engine, No. 5000, was completed in February 1935.

The first 57 locomotives were built with domeless boilers with straight throatplates and a low degree of superheat (14 elements in two rows), the boilers of the remaining 13 (5007–5019) were provided with a three-row version (21 elements) having greater total surface area and giving less obstruction to gas flow. The original 57 boilers were converted later to higher superheat (24 elements) and fitted with a dome. Further orders were placed with Crewe (5070–5074), Vulcan Foundry (5075–5124) and Armstrong Whitworth (5125–5224) for a total of 155 locomotives which were also built with domeless boilers with straight throatplates and 21 element superheaters. All these boilers, including the early converted ones with a dome, were fitted indiscriminately to any of the first 225 engines, which could appear at various times with domed or domeless boilers.

However, many of the early frames were converted to accept sloping throatplate boilers, as listed below. This modification was carried out to provide a stock of spare boilers for the early engines, which would minimise the time spent in works by engines awaiting a fresh boiler. All locomotives from no. 5225 were fitted when new with the sloping throatplate boiler. All extra boilers made had the sloping throatplate arrangement, and only one example of a later engine having been fitted with a straight throatplate boiler is known - no. 45433. Several different patterns of boiler were used on the locomotives, running into double figures. The throatplate design was the most significant, but there were also different numbers of superheater flues, firegrate arrangement, stay material, dome and water feed arrangements, washout plug placement, etc. in various combinations.

The following locomotives were built with straight throatplate boilers but were later fitted with a sloping throatplate boiler (date in brackets). Conversion was done by relocating the frame stretcher immediately in front of the firebox. Some of them reverted to straight throatplate at a later date, and these are also shown where known. Those marked with an asterisk were fitted with a boiler which had the top feed on the front ring on the date shown. In the case of No. 45087, it had previously been converted. The first conversion was carried out on no. 5022, and the last known was on no. 45163, which has been preserved.

5002 (12/37), 45007 (1/60), 45008 (1/60*), 45011 (1/49*+), 5020 (2/37), 5022 (10/36) reverted (10/58), 5023 (2/38) reverted (3/53), 5026 (2/37) reverted (1/59), 5027 (12/36), 5040 (11/36), 5045 (11/54), 5047 (1/37), 45049 (7/54) reverted (8/59), 5054 (1/37), 5057 (11/37), 5058 (11/37), 5059 (7/45), 45066 (4/60), 45082 (12/56*), 45087 (9/55) (12/60*), 5097 (1/37), 5108 (6/45), 45109 (5/48), 5142 (12/37), 45151 (3/51), 45163 (5/61), 45169 (7/55), 45197 (5/60)

=== The pre-war domed engines ===
A further 227 were ordered from Armstrong Whitworth in 1936, the largest single locomotive order ever given by a British railway to an outside contractor. Crewe built a further 20, which had higher degree superheat boilers, with 28 elements, unlike the AW boilers, which had 24 elements.

5471, built at Crewe in 1938, would be the last built for five years. During the early stages of the Second World War, the priority was for heavy freight engines, and the closely related 8Fs were produced in large numbers.

=== Wartime and postwar domed engines ===
In 1943 construction was restarted, with Derby Works building its first. Construction continued up to no. 5499. As the numbering block from 5500 was allocated to the Patriot Class, a further batch of 200 locomotives were numbered from 4800 to 4999, followed by a batch from 4658 to 4799. By this time the LMS had been nationalised, and British Railways added 40000 to all numbers. Eventually the 842 examples would number 44658–45499.

=== Ivatt engines and experimental modifications ===
From early 1947, engines were built with the top feed on the front ring of the boiler (from No. 4998), and Nos 44758-767 had a longer wheelbase (27 ft 6 in (8.38 m) rather than 27 ft 2 in (8.28 m), with the coupled wheelbase extended from 7 + 8 ft (2.1 + 2.4 m) to 7 + 8.25 ft (2.13 + 2.51 m)); this was done to accommodate the Timken roller-bearing housings without fouling the ashpan. In 1948, George Ivatt introduced more modifications to bearings and valve gear; other experimental Ivatt features included the use of steel rather than copper fireboxes on certain engines, and the fitting of double blastpipes and chimneys in some instances. 44738-57 were built with Caprotti valve gear. The last two, Nos. 44686 and 44687 built at Horwich in 1951, were fitted with a new arrangement of Caprotti valve gear, which was later used on some of the BR standard Class fives, and the BR class 8 4-6-2.

No. 4767, built at Crewe and delivered in December 1947, had outside Stephenson valve gear: instead of eccentrics, double return cranks were used to drive the eccentric rods, and a launch-type expansion link was used. This one cost £13,278, which was about £600 more than those built at the same time with Walschaerts' valve gear. The aim of the experiment was to find out if a valve gear having variable lead (as opposed to the constant lead of the Walschaerts' motion) would affect performance. On trial, it proved to have no advantage, although in normal service it did gain a reputation as a good performer on banks.

== Accidents and incidents ==
- On 13 October 1939, No. 5025 was hauling an express passenger train from Euston to Stranraer (pilot to locomotive 6130 The West Yorkshire Regiment, an LMS Royal Scot Class 4-6-0) when it was in collision with locomotive LNWR Class G1 0-8-0 9169, which was attaching a van to the rear of an Inverness train at Bletchley, Buckinghamshire, severely damaging it. Five people were killed and more than 30 were injured. No. 5025 was repaired and survives at the Strathspey Railway.
- In 1941, locomotive No. 5425 was severely damaged in a Luftwaffe air raid. It was subsequently repaired at Crewe Works.
- On 1 January 1946, engine No. 5495 was involved in the Lichfield rail crash, in which the freight train it was hauling was derailed at Lichfield Trent Valley station, Staffordshire due to faulty points. The train collided with a passenger train, which was hauled by LNWR Prince of Wales Class 4-6-0 no. 25802, killing 20 people and injuring 21.
- On 23 January 1955, locomotive No. 45274 was hauling an express passenger train that was derailed due to excessive speed on a curve, in the Sutton Coldfield rail crash. Seventeen people were killed and 64 were injured.
- On 16 January 1958, a locomotive of the class was hauling a passenger train that collided with a light engine that was standing foul of the line at Preston due to a signalman's error. Both trains were derailed; thirteen people were injured.
- On 4 February 2006, locomotive 45305 Alderman A. E. Draper collided with a rake of six carriages at Loughborough Central, damaging the locomotive and one of the carriages. Two people were injured. An investigation by the Rail Accident Investigation Branch (RAIB) found that the driver was not wearing spectacles at the time of the accident, despite it being a requirement on his medical certificate to do so when driving.
- On 2 October 2015, locomotive No. 45231 was working a private charter train for West Coast Railways (WCRC) through Doncaster when it was noticed that its TPWS (Train Protection and Warning System) had been isolated by the footplate crew. Isolation of the TPWS had been a factor in the Wootton Bassett SPAD incident in March of the same year. As a result, WCRC were suspended from operating on the national network by the Office of Rail and Road.
- On 14 June 2026, locomotive No. 44871 was involved in a derailment during a run-round at Mallaig while hauling one of West Coast Railways Jacobite services.

== Construction details ==
LMS No.	BR No.	Lot No.	Date	Built at	Boiler type	Valve gear (Walschaerts unless stated)	Bearings (plain unless stated)	Additional notes
	44658–67	199	1949	Crewe	Forward topfeed			Coupled wheelbase 7'+ 8'3"
-	44668/9	199	1949	Horwich	Forward topfeed		Skefco roller bearings on driving axles	Coupled wheelbase 7'+ 8'3"
-	44670–7	199	1950	Horwich	Forward topfeed		Skefco roller bearings on driving axles	Coupled wheelbase 7'+ 8'3"
-	44678–85	199	1950	Horwich	Forward topfeed		Skefco roller bearings throughout	Coupled wheelbase 7'+ 8'3"
-	44686/7	199	1951	Horwich	Forward topfeed	British Caprotti	Skefco roller bearings throughout	Coupled wheelbase 7'+ 8'3"
-	44688–97	199	1950	Horwich	Forward topfeed		Timken roller bearings on driving axles	Coupled wheelbase 7'+ 8'3"
-	44698–717	192	1948	Horwich	Forward topfeed			Coupled wheelbase 7'+ 8'3"
-	44718–27	192	1948	Crewe	Forward topfeed			Steel firebox, Coupled wheelbase 7'+ 8'3"
-	44728–37	192	1948	Crewe	Forward topfeed			Coupled wheelbase 7'+ 8'3"
-	44738–47	187	1948	Crewe	Forward topfeed	Caprotti	Timken roller bearings throughout	Coupled wheelbase 7'+ 8'3"
4748–53	44748–53	187	1948	Crewe	Forward topfeed	Caprotti	Timken roller bearings throughout	Coupled wheelbase 7'+ 8'3"
-	44754–5	187	1948	Crewe	Forward topfeed	Caprotti		Coupled wheelbase 7'+ 8'3"
-	44756–7	187	1948	Crewe	Forward topfeed	Caprotti		double chimney, Coupled wheelbase 7'+ 8'3"
4758–66	44758–66	187	1947	Crewe	Forward topfeed		Timken roller bearings throughout	Coupled wheelbase 7'+ 8'3"
4767	44767	187	1947	Crewe	Forward topfeed	Stephenson link motion	Timken roller bearings throughout	double chimney, preserved - Coupled wheelbase 7'+ 8'3"
4768–82	44768–82	187	1947	Crewe	Forward topfeed			
4783–99	44783–99	187	1947	Horwich	Forward topfeed			
4800–6	44800–6	153	1944	Derby	Domed			
4807–25	44807–25	170	1944	Derby	Domed			
4826–60	44826–60	170	1945	Derby	Domed			
4861–71	44861–71	170	1945	Crewe	Domed			
4872–920	44872–920	174	1945	Crewe	Domed			
4921–31	44921–31	174	1945	Crewe	Domed			
4932–43	44932–43	174	1945	Horwich	Domed			
4944–66	44944–66	174	1946	Horwich	Domed			
4967–81	44967–81	174	1946	Crewe	Domed			
4982–90	44982–90	183	1946	Horwich	Domed			
4991–6	44991–6	183	1947	Horwich	Domed			
4997–9	44997–9	187	1947	Horwich	Forward topfeed			4997 was fitted with boiler 12462 from new which had the top feed on the 2nd ring, the other two had later pattern boilers.
5000–19	45000–19	114	1935	Crewe	Domeless			
5020–65	45020–65	119	1934	Vulcan Foundry	Domeless			
5066–9	45066–9	119	1935	Vulcan Foundry	Domeless			
5070–4	45070–4	122	1935	Crewe	Domeless			
5075–5124	45075–5124	123	1935	Vulcan Foundry	Domeless			
5125–5224	45125–5224	124	1935	Armstrong Whitworth	Domeless			
5225–98	45225–98	131	1936	Armstrong Whitworth	Domed			
5299–5451	45299–5451	131	1937	Armstrong Whitworth	Domed			
5452–71	45452–71	142	1938	Crewe	Domed			
5472–81	45472–81	151	1943	Derby	Domed			
5482–91	45482–91	152	1944	Derby	Domed			
5492–9	45492–9	153	1944	Derby	Domed			

== Names ==
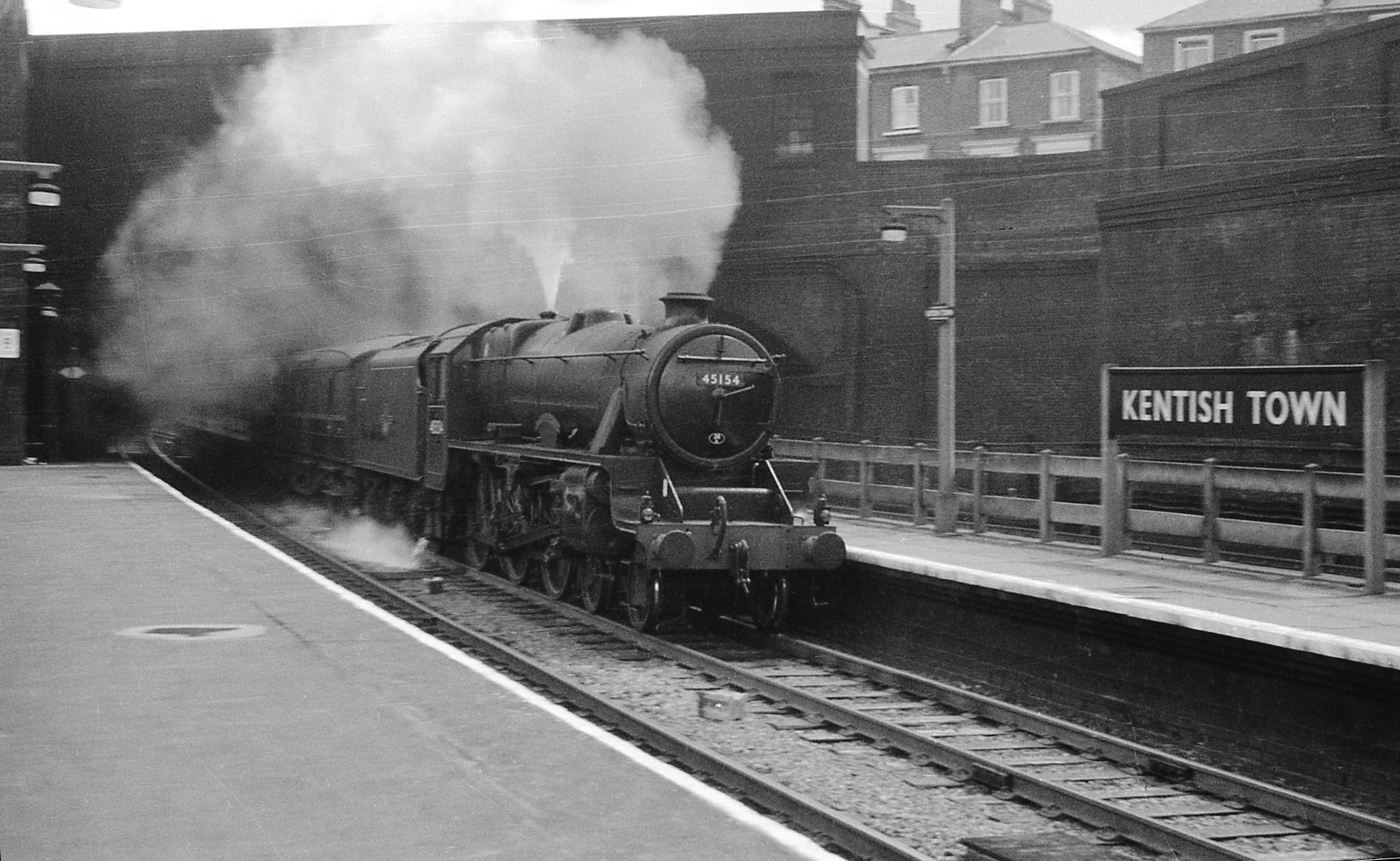
A named LMS Black 5 No. 45154 Lanarkshire Yeomanry in 1960.

Only five Black Fives received names during their mainline working lives, a small percentage of the total produced, although seven more have been named in preservation (see below). All of those named in mainline service were named after Scottish regiments. Locomotive 5155 carried the name The Queen's Edinburgh for only two years during the Second World War. Some sources have noted that no photographic confirmation of this naming is extant, although this is neither unique to the class, nor unexpected given restrictions on photography during wartime. The evidence for the naming of the locomotive is set out in full in various sources.

Stanier Class 5 4-6-0 names
LMS No.	BR No.	Name	Date named	Name removed
5154	45154	Lanarkshire Yeomanry	1937	1966 (withdrawal from service)
5155	45155	The Queen's Edinburgh	1942	1944 (remained in service until 1964)
5156	45156	Ayrshire Yeomanry	1936	1968 (withdrawal from service)
5157	45157	The Glasgow Highlander	1936	1962 (withdrawal from service)
5158	45158	Glasgow Yeomanry	1936	1964 (withdrawal from service)

== Withdrawal ==
The class remained intact until 1961 when 45401 was the first Black Five to be withdrawn from stock following a collision at Warrington, although the boiler was re-used and actually lasted to the end of steam on BR. The remainder of the class were withdrawn between 1962 and 1968. Some members of the class, 46 in total, survived to the last day of steam on BR in August 1968. No. 45318, a Lostock Hall based engine, hauled the last scheduled train on 3 August 1968; a Preston to Liverpool exchange. The locomotive was withdrawn a few days later and then scrapped the following year at Drapers.

Table of withdrawals
Year	Quantity in service at start of year	Quantity withdrawn	Locomotive numbers	Notes
1961	842	1	45401.	
1962	841	21	45030/36/85–86/98; 45119/25/51–52/57/59/65/69/74/79; 45265–66; 45355; 45452–53/58	
1963	820	29	44706/40/44/47/50/55; 44885; 44969; 45010/22–23/49/87/99; 45100/23/66/75/89/99; 45244/51; 45315/17/20/58/67; 45457/85	
1964	791	67	44660/76; 44701/19/38/42/45–46/48–49/51–52/54/56/83–85/89/93; 44801/49; 44922–23/57/61/67–68/76/94/96; 45007–08/32/35/66/88; 45103/21–22/36/44/53/55/58/70/72–73/83; 45356/61/66/84; 45400/13/56/59/62/65/68/70/76/79	
1965	724	97	44673/86; 44702/16/21/39/41/53/57/63–64/69/87/99; 44823/27; 44901/04/21/24/31/39/55/59/70/73/79–80; 45002/09/11/20/26/37/68/74/77–78/80/84/92/94; 45102/08/13/17/42–43/46/48/63/71/78/80/84/92/94; 45229–30/37/45/57/72/86/91/93; 45300–01/06/13–14/27/34–35/37/51/54/60/62/78–80/87/89/98; 45414/16/29/39/43/60/71/86/91/98	44901, 45163, 45293, 45337/79, 45491 preserved
1966	627	171	44668/70/87–88/92/98; 44700/03–05/07/10/12/14/18/20/23–24/26/29/31/43/60/62/79/82/86/88/91/97–98; 44808/10–11/13/20/39/41/47/50/69/80–81; 44908/19/25/35/41/45/51–54/56/60/66/72/74/77/84/87/92/95/99; 45004/12/16/18/29/33/44–45/47/51/53/58/63/82/84/91/97; 45105/12/15/18/27–29/37–38/40/54/60–62/64/68/76–77/81–82/85/95; 45205/07/10/13–14/16–18/20/23–24/33/35/38/48–49/52/89; 45309/11/22/25/29/32–33/38/44/48/57/64–65/70/72/85/93/96/99; 45403/08/10/18–19/22/27/30/32–34/38/42/51/61/63–64/67/69/72–75/77–78/80/83/88–90/92	
1967	456	305	44658–59/61–62/66–67/69/71/74–75/77–82/84–85/89/91/93–97/99; 44717/22/25/27/30/32–34/36–37/59/65–68/70–76/78/90/92/94–96; 44805/12/14/17/19/21–22/24–26/28/30–35/37/40/43–44/52–54/56–63/65–67/70/72–73/75–76/79/82–83/86–87/92–93/95–96/98; 44900/02/05/07/09/11–18/20/27–28/30/33–34/36–38/43–44/46/48/58/62/64/81–83/85–86/88–91/93/97–98; 45000/03/06/14–15/19/21/24/28/31/39–43/48/50/52/56–57/59–62/64/67/69–72/75/79–80/83/89/92/94; 45106–07/09/11/16/20/24/26/30/32/35/39/41/45/47/67/86/88/91/93/96–98; 45204/08/11/15/19/21–22/25–26/28/32/34/36/39–43/46–47/50/56/59/61/63–64/67/70–71/73–78/80–81/83/85/88/92/95/97–99; 45302–04/07–08/19/21/23–24/26/28/31/36/39–41/43/46–47/49/52/59/63/68–69/71/73–74/77/83; 45402/04–06/09/12/15/17/23/25/28/31/37/40–41/46/48–50/54–55/66/81/94–95	44767, 45000/428 preserved
1968	151	151	44663–65/72/83/90; 44708–09/11/13/15/28/35/58/61/77/80–81; 44800/02–04/06–07/09/15–16/18/29/36/38/42/45–46/48/51/55/64/68/71/74/77–78/84/88–91/94/97/99; 44903/06/10/26/29/32/40/42/47/49–50/63/65/71; 45001/05/13/17/25/27/34/38/46/54–55/65/73/76/95–96; 45101/04/10/14/31/33–134/49–50/56/87/90; 45200–03/06/09/12/27/31/53–55/58/60/62/68–69/79/82/84/87/90/94/96; 45305/10/12/16/18/30/42/45/50/53/75–76/81–82/86/88/90–92/94–95/97; 45407/11/20–21/24/26/35–36/44–45/47/93	44806/71/932, 45025/110, 45212/31, 45305, 45407 preserved

== Preservation ==
Eighteen Black Fives have been preserved, with twelve of them being purchased directly from BR for preservation (these being 44767, 44806, 44871, 44932, 45000, 45025, 45110, 45212, 45231, 45305, 45407 & 45428), the remaining six being rescued from Woodham Brothers' Barry Scrapyard (these being 44901, 45163, 45293, 45337, 45379 & 45491). Members of each of the builder's batches have survived into preservation: seven LMS-built engines and eleven by outside contractors. Of the eighteen to be preserved, fourteen have operated in preservation, the class members that have not yet run being 44901, 45163, 45293 & 45491. Thirteen Black Fives have been operated on the main line in preservation: 44767, 44806, 44871, 44932, 45000, 45025, 45110, 45212, 45231, 45305, 45337, 45407 & 45428.

As of May 2026, there are seven Black Fives in traffic, five of which have valid main line certificates. 44871, 44932 & 45407 have full main line certificates for use over the national network, while 44806 and 45428 are certified for main line use between Grosmont and Whitby only. Both 45025 and 45110 are only able to operate on preserved lines. 44767 & 45337 are in the process of undergoing overhauls, 45231 boiler certificate expired in January 2024 while four, 44901, 45163, 45293 and 45491, are undergoing restorations from Barry Scrapyard condition.

No. 44781 was a candidate for preservation, but was scrapped. In 2019, parts were rediscovered in Bartlow and in the National Railway Museum's collection in York.

Numbers in bold are those carried.

=== Preserved locos ===
Number	Name (Note: In all cases names are historically inaccurate, i.e. they have all been applied since preservation. Some engines might still have their names but where marked indicates that they currently do not carry them. Either for authenticity or other reasons like the engine is running in another identity.)	Builder	Boiler Type	Built	Withdrawn	Home Location	Status	Livery	Dual Braked	Notes
LMS / BR	Name	Builder	Boiler Type	Service Life		Home Location	Status	Livery	Dual Braked	Notes
4767; **44767**	George Stephenson (Note: 44767 carries a plaque on the splasher beneath the nameplate that reads 'This locomotive was named by the Rt. Hon. William Whitelaw, C.H., M.C., M.P. at Shildon on 25 August 1975, to commemorate the 150th anniversary of the Stockton and Darlington Railway.')	Crewe Works	Forward Topfeed	Dec 1947	Dec 1967	Carnforth MPD	Under overhaul as of 2026	BR Lined Black, Late Crest (on completion)	No	This locomotive was the sole member of the class equipped with Stephenson valve gear. Permitted to run at 75 mph due to it having free-running roller bearings.
4767; **44767**	George Stephenson	Crewe Works	Forward Topfeed	20 Years, 1 Month		Carnforth MPD	Under overhaul as of 2026	BR Lined Black, Late Crest (on completion)	No	This locomotive was the sole member of the class equipped with Stephenson valve gear. Permitted to run at 75 mph due to it having free-running roller bearings.
4806; **44806**		Derby Works	Domed	Jul 1944	Aug 1968	North Yorkshire Moors Railway	Operational and mainline certified as of 2026	BR Lined Black, Late Crest	No	Formerly named Magpie and later renamed to Kenneth Aldcroft (Note: 44806 was named after the TV series "Magpie" in 1973, it continued to wear this name during the time it was based at the Lakeside and Haverthwaite Railway and when it relocated to the Llangollen Railway until it was withdrawn for overhaul in 2003. After emerging from its last overhaul in 2007 it ran without the nameplates but was later named after its former owner "Kenneth Aldcroft". It is now based at the North Yorkshire Moors Railway and has since had its nameplates removed.)
4806; **44806**		Derby Works	Domed	24 Years, 1 Month		North Yorkshire Moors Railway	Operational and mainline certified as of 2026	BR Lined Black, Late Crest	No	Formerly named Magpie and later renamed to Kenneth Aldcroft
4871; **44871**		Crewe Works	Domed	Mar 1945	Aug 1968	Riley & Son (E) Ltd, Heywood	Operational and mainline certified as of 2026	BR Lined Black, Early Emblem	Yes	Hauled Fifteen Guinea Special in August 1968.
4871; **44871**		Crewe Works	Domed	23 Years, 5 Months		Riley & Son (E) Ltd, Heywood	Operational and mainline certified as of 2026	BR Lined Black, Early Emblem	Yes	Hauled Fifteen Guinea Special in August 1968.
4901; 44901		Crewe Works	Domed	Oct 1945	Aug 1965	Vale of Berkeley Railway	Boiler being overhauled by Riley & Son (E) Ltd, frames stored at private location (as of 2026)	N/A	No	Boiler sold in February 2013 to Ian Riley as a spare for 44871 and 45407.
4901; 44901		Crewe Works	Domed	19 Years, 10 Months		Vale of Berkeley Railway	Boiler being overhauled by Riley & Son (E) Ltd, frames stored at private location (as of 2026)	N/A	No	Boiler sold in February 2013 to Ian Riley as a spare for 44871 and 45407.
4932; **44932**		Horwich Works	Domed	Sep 1945	Aug 1968	Carnforth MPD	Operational and mainline certified as of 2026.	BR Lined Black, British Railways Lettering	No	
4932; **44932**		Horwich Works	Domed	22 Years, 11 Months		Carnforth MPD	Operational and mainline certified as of 2026.	BR Lined Black, British Railways Lettering	No	
**5000**; 45000		Crewe Works	Domeless	Mar 1935	Oct 1967	Shildon Locomotion Museum	Static Display.	LMS Lined Black	No	Part of the National Collection, last steamed in 1989.
**5000**; 45000		Crewe Works	Domeless	32 Years, 8 Months		Shildon Locomotion Museum	Static Display.	LMS Lined Black	No	Part of the National Collection, last steamed in 1989.
**5025**; 45025		Vulcan Foundry	Domeless	Aug 1934	Aug 1968	Strathspey Railway	Operational as of 2026	LMS Lined Black	No	Oldest surviving member of the class
**5025**; 45025		Vulcan Foundry	Domeless	34 Years		Strathspey Railway	Operational as of 2026	LMS Lined Black	No	Oldest surviving member of the class
5110; **45110**		Vulcan Foundry	Domeless	Jul 1935	Aug 1968	Carnforth MPD	Operational as of 2026	BR Lined Black, Late Crest	No	Purchased from Severn Valley Railway by private owner in August 2023. Hauled Fifteen Guinea Special in August 1968, and formerly named RAF Biggin Hill
5110; **45110**		Vulcan Foundry	Domeless	33 Years, 1 Month		Carnforth MPD	Operational as of 2026	BR Lined Black, Late Crest	No	Purchased from Severn Valley Railway by private owner in August 2023. Hauled Fifteen Guinea Special in August 1968, and formerly named RAF Biggin Hill
5163; 45163		Armstrong Whitworth	Domed	Aug 1935	May 1965	Riley & Son (E) Ltd, Heywood	Under restoration as of 2026.	N/A	Yes	To be operated by Riley and Son for a minimum of 25 years following completion of restoration.
5163; 45163		Armstrong Whitworth	Domed	29 Years, 9 Months		Riley & Son (E) Ltd, Heywood	Under restoration as of 2026.	N/A	Yes	To be operated by Riley and Son for a minimum of 25 years following completion of restoration.
5212; **45212**		Armstrong Whitworth	Domed	Nov 1935	Aug 1968	Keighley and Worth Valley Railway	Boiler ticket expired, awaiting assessment as of 2026	BR Lined Black, Late Crest	Yes	
5212; **45212**		Armstrong Whitworth	Domed	32 Years, 9 Months		Keighley and Worth Valley Railway	Boiler ticket expired, awaiting assessment as of 2026	BR Lined Black, Late Crest	Yes	
5231; **45231**	The Sherwood Forester	Armstrong Whitworth	Domed	Aug 1936	Aug 1968	Crewe Diesel TMD	Under overhaul as of 2026	BR Lined Black, Late Crest	Yes	
5231; **45231**	The Sherwood Forester	Armstrong Whitworth	Domed	32 Years		Crewe Diesel TMD	Under overhaul as of 2026	BR Lined Black, Late Crest	Yes	
5293; 45293		Armstrong Whitworth	Domed	Dec 1937	Aug 1965	Colne Valley Railway	Under restoration as of 2026.	N/A	No	
5293; 45293		Armstrong Whitworth	Domed	27 Years, 8 Months		Colne Valley Railway	Under restoration as of 2026.	N/A	No	
5305; **45305**	Alderman A. E. Draper	Armstrong Whitworth	Domed	Jan 1937	Aug 1968	Great Central Railway	Under overhaul as of 2026	TBC	No	
5305; **45305**	Alderman A. E. Draper	Armstrong Whitworth	Domed	31 Years, 7 Months		Great Central Railway	Under overhaul as of 2026	TBC	No	
**5337**; 45337		Armstrong Whitworth	Domed	Apr 1937	Feb 1965	Riley & Sons (E) Ltd, Heywood	Under overhaul as of 2026	LMS Lined Black (on completion)	No	
**5337**; 45337		Armstrong Whitworth	Domed	27 Years, 10 Months		Riley & Sons (E) Ltd, Heywood	Under overhaul as of 2026	LMS Lined Black (on completion)	No	
5379; **45379**		Armstrong Whitworth	Domed	Jul 1937	Jul 1965	Watercress Line	Stored at the One:One Collection at Margate as of 2026	BR Lined Black, Late Crest	No	Boiler ticket expired in early September 2018
5379; **45379**		Armstrong Whitworth	Domed	28 Years 1 Month		Watercress Line	Stored at the One:One Collection at Margate as of 2026	BR Lined Black, Late Crest	No	Boiler ticket expired in early September 2018
5407; **45407**	The Lancashire Fusilier	Armstrong Whitworth	Domed	Sep 1937	Aug 1968	East Lancashire Railway	Operational and mainline certified as of 2026	BR Lined Black, Early Emblem	Yes	Owned by Ian Riley.
5407; **45407**	The Lancashire Fusilier	Armstrong Whitworth	Domed	30 Years, 11 Months		East Lancashire Railway	Operational and mainline certified as of 2026	BR Lined Black, Early Emblem	Yes	Owned by Ian Riley.
**5428**; 45428	Eric Treacy	Armstrong Whitworth	Domed	Oct 1937	Oct 1967	North Yorkshire Moors Railway	Undergoing repair as of 2026	LMS Lined Black	No	
**5428**; 45428	Eric Treacy	Armstrong Whitworth	Domed	30 Years		North Yorkshire Moors Railway	Undergoing repair as of 2026	LMS Lined Black	No	
5491; 45491		Derby Works	Forward Topfeed	Dec 1943	Jul 1965	Great Central Railway	Stored as of 2026	N/A	No	Only surviving example having a boiler with top feed on the front ring in conjunction with Walschaerts valve gear.
5491; 45491		Derby Works	Forward Topfeed	21 Years, 7 Months		Great Central Railway	Stored as of 2026	N/A	No	Only surviving example having a boiler with top feed on the front ring in conjunction with Walschaerts valve gear.

== Sound ==
- 45212 passing Green End

== In fiction ==
In The Railway Series children's books by the Rev. W. Awdry and its television adaption Thomas and Friends, the character Henry the Green Engine, who was formerly based on flawed LNER Gresley A1 prototype designs, was rebuilt into a Black Five at Crewe Works after crashing into a goods train while pulling the Flying Kipper (a nightly fish train from Tidmouth, Sodor to Manchester) in 1935.

== In artwork ==
A Black 5 locomotive appears in the 1938 René Magritte painting Time Transfixed.

== See also ==
- BR Standard Class 5
