= West Coast Railways =

English railway company

Coordinates: 54.1311°N 2.7727°W

- Industry: Locomotive spot-hire; Charter train operations
- Predecessor: Steamtown Carnforth
- Founded: June 1998
- Headquarters: Carnforth, England
- Key people: David Smith (Majority owner); Patricia Marshall (Managing Director)
- Website: www.westcoastrailways.co.uk

West Coast Railways (WCR) is a railway spot-hire company and charter train operator based at Carnforth MPD in Lancashire. Using buildings and other facilities previously owned by the Steamtown Carnforth visitor attraction, in June 1998 the company became the first privately owned company to be given a licence as a train operating company.

== History ==
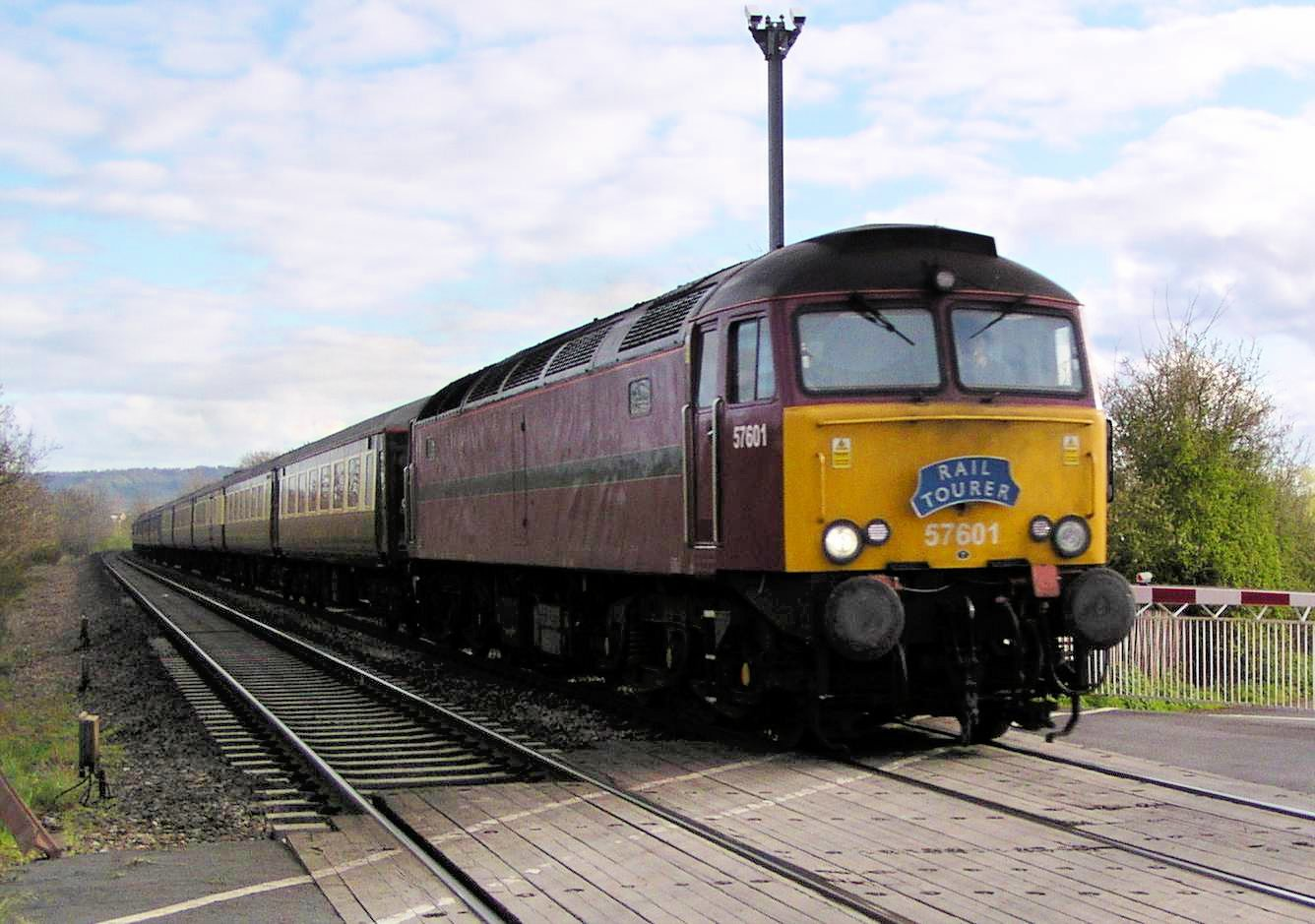
57601 passing Brockhampton in April 2005

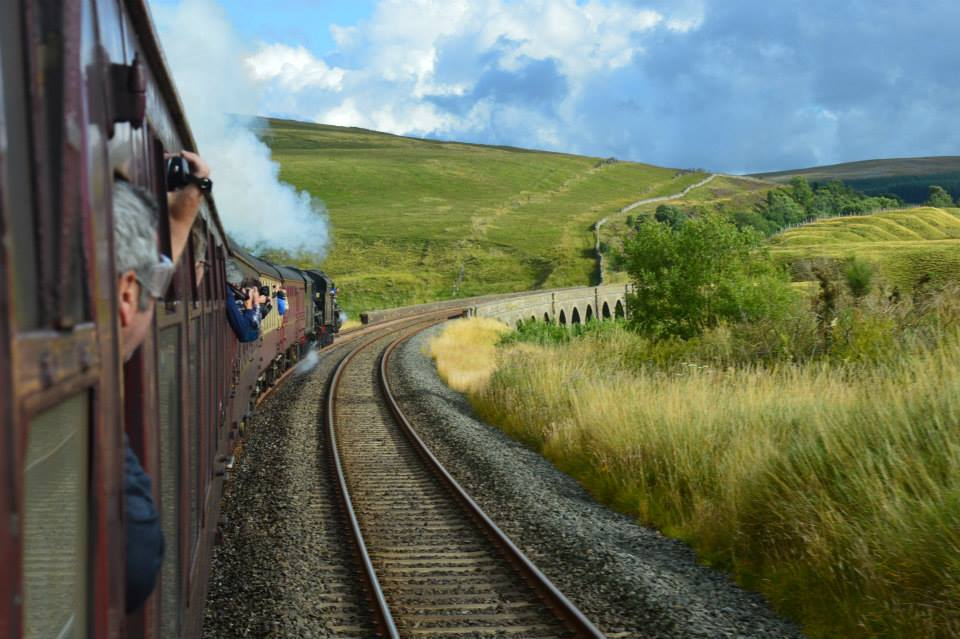
45231 & 44932 on the Settle & Carlisle line in August 2013

=== Before 1998 ===
After British Rail closed the Lakeside branch to passengers on 6 September 1965, a group of enthusiasts chaired by Dr. Peter Beet formed the Lakeside Railway Estates Company, with the idea of preserving both the line and Carnforth MPD, to provide a complete steam operating system. After agreeing to rent out part of the Carnforth MPD site, but with the counter the development of the A590 road meaning that the complete vision was unsuccessful, Beet developed the visitor attraction Steamtown Carnforth, which became a mecca for steam enthusiasts from 1967.

In 1974, Sir Bill McAlpine became a shareholder in the company, with his 4472 Flying Scotsman making Carnforth its home. McAlpine subsequently acquired a controlling interest in the company, in order to fund the purchase of the complete site including the track from British Rail.

In light of McAlpine's declining interest, in 1990 his controlling interest in Steamtown Railway Museum was sold to David Smith, who over the following years has bought out most of the minority shareholders. With increasing Health & Safety Executive regulations, and an increased reliance on revenue from supplying and servicing steam locomotives to power enthusiast trains, the commercial decision was taken not to reopen Carnforth as a museum or visitor attraction for the 1998 season. Steamtown Railway Museum still exists today as the holding company, and operates an extensive railway repair and operating facility on the site.

=== After 1998 ===
In June 1998, West Coast Railway Company was granted an operating licence to become a train operating company. WCR is a spot hire company which provides locomotives, stock and crews to other companies within the rail industry. The company operates charter trains, some of which are hauled by steam locomotives. The company provides stock and crews for steam workings on the national network, and for diesel tours. The headquarters, engineering base and depot are at Carnforth, where locomotives and stock are stored and maintained, and where contract work is undertaken for other operators.

WCR own and operated steam locomotive 5972 Olton Hall under the guise of Hogwarts Castle for the Harry Potter film series, with the Hogwarts Express.

==== March 2015 incident and operating licence suspension ====
On 7 March 2015, the 16:35 east bound Cathedrals Express operated by WCR (Bristol Temple Meads to Southend East) approaching from Chippenham, headed by Battle of Britain class No. 34067 Tangmere and 13 coaches passed signal SN45 at danger at Wootton Bassett Junction on the Great Western Main Line, overrunning the signal by 700 yards (640 m) and coming to a stand blocking the junction. This occurred less than a minute after an eastbound/up service from Swansea to London Paddington (operated by an InterCity 125 set), approaching via the Badminton line, had cleared the junction at 100 miles per hour (160 km/h). The signal was being maintained at danger to ensure the safety of the InterCity service after it had passed through the junction, as is signalling practice.

The incident was investigated by track owner Network Rail (NR), the Office of Rail Regulation and the Rail Accident Investigation Branch (RAIB). The RAIB launched an investigation into the incident on 27 March, releasing a statement in which they described the incident as a "dangerous occurrence". According to the RAIB, the incident was caused by driver error, after the traincrew isolated the Automatic Warning System and Train Protection & Warning System on approach to a temporary speed restriction in the area of line immediately after signal SN43, the signal before signal SN45. These were not reinstated on approach to signal SN45; as a result, the train was not automatically stopped by the safety systems as it passed the signal at danger. 700 yards (640 m) down the line, the train was manually brought to a stop by the driver; it came to a rest across Wootton Bassett Junction.

WCR and NR met on 30 March 2015. NR subsequently expressed the view that at that meeting "WCR demonstrated that its controls, communication and commitment following the recent SPAD were inadequate" and that since then "the response by the senior management of WCR to the issues raised" had been "inadequate", suspending WCR's operator's licence effective from midnight 3 April 2015. Previously operators had been banned from certain routes, but this was a total network ban unprecedented since privatisation. The suspension notice states:

Network Rail has had concerns about WCR's performance of its Safety Obligations for some time, and recent events lead Network Rail to believe that the operations of WCR are a threat to the safe operation of the railway. If five of the seven required remedies are completed by May 15, with demonstrable progress towards completion of the other two, the suspension notice will be withdrawn. The required steps include introducing a risk-based driver monitoring regime, and demonstrating that there is an effective and secure system of tamper-evident seals for train protection isolator cocks on all relevant traction.

WCR stated that it was in negotiations with NR regarding the terms of the suspension, and also with other train operating companies in order to prevent the cancellation of many scheduled WCR operated railtours during the period of suspension.

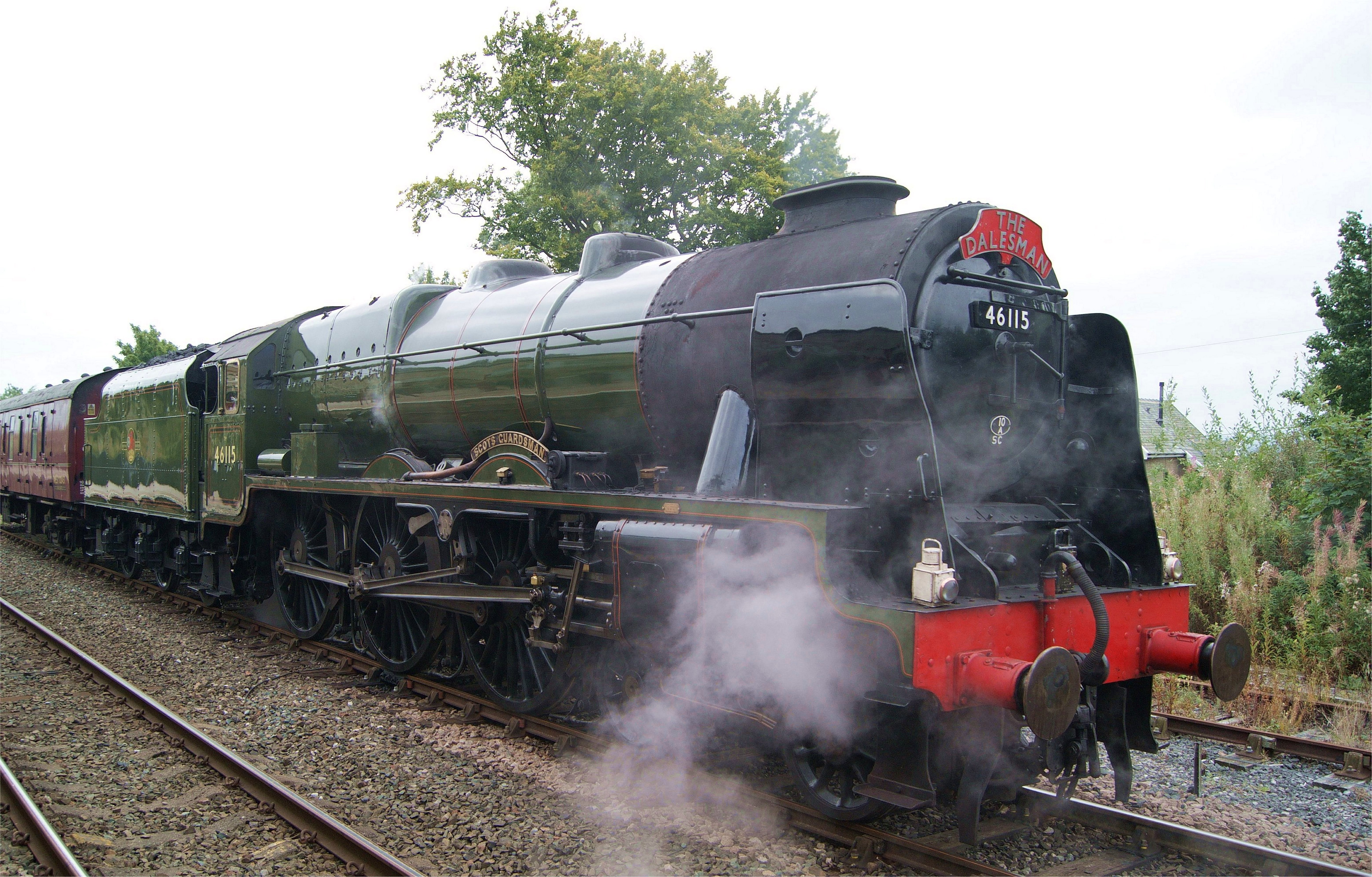
46115 Scots Guardsman, in BR green livery, at Hellifield, being prepared for the weekly "Dalesman" run on the Settle - Carlisle line.

On 8 May 2015, Network Rail lifted the track access ban off the company. This meant that the company could continue its scheduled tours for the coming months including the first of the Jacobite railtours.

Network Rail has confirmed that it reinstated West Coast Railway Company's track access agreement as of 00:01 this morning, five weeks after suspending the organisation over safety concerns. In a letter to West Coast Railway Company, Paul McMahon, Director for Freight at Network Rail, said that the company welcomed the commitment WCR has made to improving safety through changes to the Safety Management System (SMS), and the appointing of a new Director/General Manager, Head of Safety and Non-Executive Director. The new interim Head of Safety, Alex McGregor, from Lloyds Register and a Non-Executive Director are being appointed before services recommence.

On 9 December 2015, the Office of Rail & Road (ORR) announced that the WCR and the driver of the train involved in the incident at Wootton Bassett were to be prosecuted for offences contrary to the Health and Safety at Work etc. Act 1974. An initial hearing was scheduled at Swindon Magistrates Court for 11 January 2016. The case came to trial at Swindon Crown Court on 27 June 2016. WCR and driver Melvyn Cox both pleaded guilty. WCR was fined £200,000 and £64,000 costs. Cox was given a four-month prison sentence, suspended for eighteen months. He was also ordered to do 80 hours unpaid work.

==== Other Incidents in 2015 ====
- On 13 June 2015 it was reported that a service had moved forward at Reading at the same time as the doors were open. This was attributed to a miscommunication between the guard and the driver.
- On 19 August 2015 it was reported that the company had no systems in place for keeping drivers updated with route changes, instead getting updates from other operators, and no system for managing driver training.
- On 5 September 2015 it was reported that a service had hit the buffer at Weymouth. This was not reported to the ORR, contrary to RIDDOR rules.
- On 15 September 2015 it was reported that risk assessments for steam operation were outdated, and staff were unaware of them.
- On 2 October 2015 it was reported that a service had an unauthorised TPWS activation at Doncaster signal 264 at Hexthorpe Junction, between Doncaster and Conisbrough, whilst a locomotive and support coach was reversing.
- On 24 November 2015 it was reported that the ORR had temporarily prohibited WCR from operating steam trains on the mainline rail network, following an initial investigation into an incident near Doncaster on 2 October 2015 when 45231 The Sherwood Forester was hauling a WCR 'Spirit of the Lakes' charter train and the footplate crew of the engine had isolated the Train Protection & Warning System equipment which would have applied the emergency brake if the driver made a safety critical error.
- On 26 November 2015 it was reported that a service had moved at Bath Spa, approximately 1 meter, with the doors open and passengers boarding.
- On 1 December 2015 it was reported that an Improvement Notice was served on WCR following an inspection at Southall Railway Depot, due to issues around managing health and safety risks.

==== February 2016 Prohibition Notice ====
On 17 February 2016 the ORR issued a Prohibition Notice to WCR preventing it running its heritage rail services on the mainline railway. The notice related to concerns about WCR's management of safety, following a number of incidents over the past year. Under the terms of the notice, the company was not able to operate trains on the mainline network until the ORR was satisfied its governance and operations meet industry practice. Steps the company were required to take included: the introduction of clearer governance structures with proper accountability for safety; more robust risk assessments; and enhanced processes for managing staff with a focus on safety culture. Ian Prosser, HM Chief Inspector of Railways at ORR, said the decision to revoke the company's safety certificate had "not been taken lightly". The track access ban was lifted on 23 March 2016.

==== June 2023 Prohibition Notice ====
On 9 June 2023, a safety inspector attended the Jacobite service and found health and safety breaches. A prohibition notice was issued, coming into effect on 15 June 2023, preventing West Coast Railways from running the Jacobite until the issues discovered were rectified. Service was resumed on 21 August 2023.

==== January 2024 Exemption Revoked ====
In January 2024, the Office of Road and Rail issued West Coast Railways with a certificate of revocation for the exemption of its hinged door rolling stock with immediate effect from 11 January (the exemption was originally intended to expire on 29 February). Following the revocation of their exemption to run hinged door rolling stock until the end of February, West Coast Railways issued a statement: “We are extremely disappointed by this decision. We remain committed to working with the ORR to agree how we can safeguard the future of our heritage services. We are already considering a range of options and have asked the ORR to allow the current exemption to run its course, to give us time to put forward detailed proposals."

==== March 2024 New Request Sent ====
In March 2024, WCR announced that due to the ongoing issues with their coaches all Jacobite services which were due to start on 28 March were to be suspended until further notice. A new exemption request was submitted to the ORR on 8 March to allow the use of their Mk1 and Mk2 coaches for their 2024 railtour season alongside 2024's Jacobite services. In April 2024, it was confirmed that the deliberation for a new exemption request would take four months. The request was later declined due to missing paperwork.

==== 2026 Revised Application Sent ====
In June 2026 it was announced that following the submition of a revised application to the Office of Rail & Road in early 2026, the ORR are soon due to tell West Coast Railways whether its latest attempt to gain exemption to run BR Mk1 and MK2 stock without Central Door Locking has been successful. The revised application has requested a 13 year exemption until 2039 to permit the fitment of CDL to the coaches alongside develop the technology.

==== June 2026 derailment ====
On 14 June, a WCR locomotive was involved in a derailment during a run-round at Mallaig.

== Services ==
=== Jacobite ===
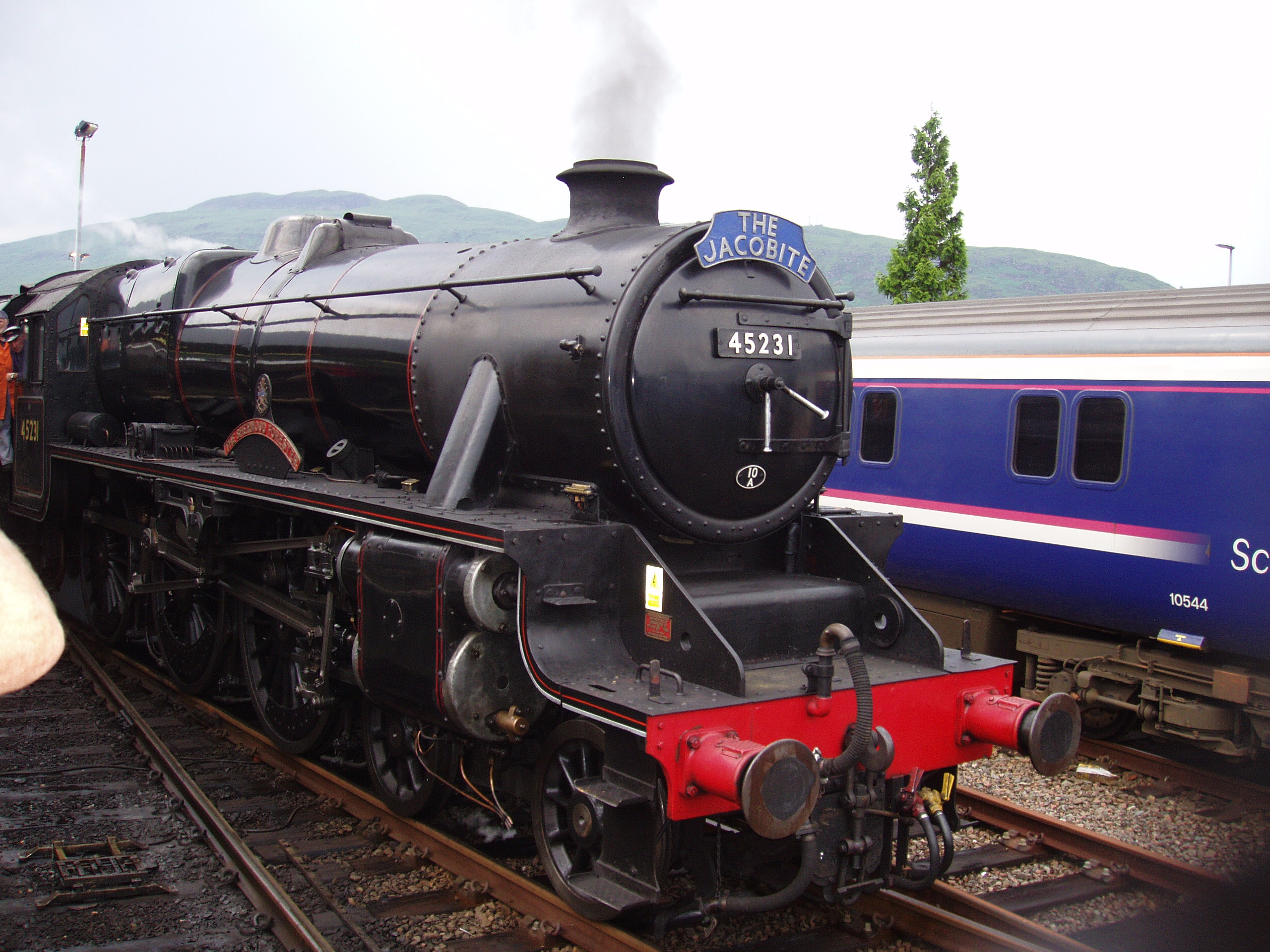
45231 The Sherwood Forester at Fort William after hauling The Jacobite from Mallaig; this is a regular service run by West Coast Railways from early May till late October.

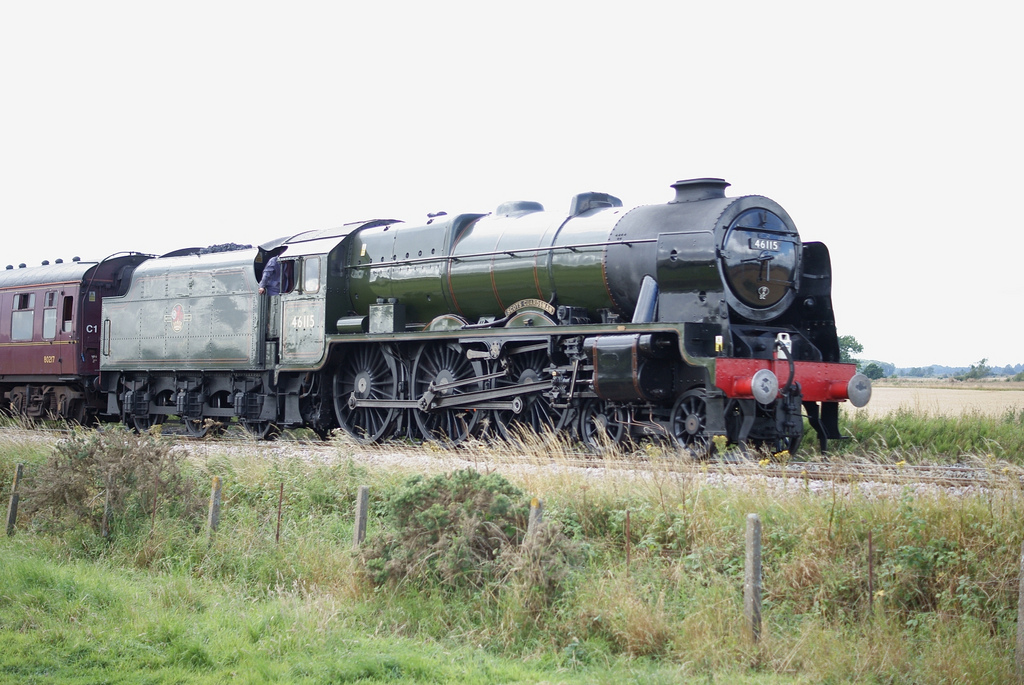
46115 working one of WCR's regular trains from York to Scarborough

WCR operates several regular steam-hauled excursions every summer. The most famous of these trains is The Jacobite (named for the historic Jacobite political movement). It runs along the West Highland Line from Fort William to Mallaig, a highlight of the route being the crossing of the Glenfinnan Viaduct. It runs Monday to Fridays from the middle of May until the end of October and also runs at weekends from the end of June until the end of August.

In 2011, WCR added a second Jacobite service, leaving Fort William in the afternoons from the start of June until the end of August running on Wednesdays, Thursdays and Fridays. 2012 saw this second service increase to five days a week, between June and August. In July 2023, all services were suspended following an inspection by the ORR. The morning services resumed on 9 August and the afternoon services restarted on 18 August.

In January 2024, WCR announced that discussions were being made regarding the viability of running a third Jacobite service. This service would however only run from Fort William to Arisaig, departure was set to be at 17:43 and arrive at 19:43 (a half hour long break at Glenfinnan is to be included). The return arrival at Fort William was provisionally going to be 21:18, however the entire proposal was later abandoned. In March 2024, WCR announced that due to the ongoing issues with their coaches all Jacobite services, which were supposed to start on 28 March, were to be suspended until further notice. In April 2024, WCR announced that the ongoing deliberation between them and the ORR for a new exemption on central door locking was expected to take four months and, that should their exemption request be rejected, Jacobite services would not be run for 2024. The morning Jacobite services restarted on 15 April 2024, albeit at a shorter length and a reduced capacity.

The 2026 Jacobite services were delayed with the start in April not taking place due to the ongoing coaches situation. West Coast's position remained that it wouldn't run 2026 trains with air-con stock. However by June 2026 the ORR still hadn't made its decision on WCR's latest exemption request with revisions & due to the need to protect the use it or loose it rights for the paths, the 2026 Jacobite season started on 2 June using MK2's with pressure vents to permit the use without a diesel on the rear to power electrics. In an interview by Trackside with David Smith he stated. "There's no guarantee we'll continue, we're taking it day by day".

=== Scarborough Spa Express ===
In July 2002, WCR began to operate the steam-hauled Scarborough Spa Express operated from York to Scarborough three times a week between July and September. After a steam ban on the eastern region in 2014 which resulted in the season being axed a restricted season ran for 2015 over three days in October. This was once again put into place for three days in October 2016; the tour was also renamed The Scarborough Flyer for the 2016 season.

The tour originally ran from York to Scarborough travelling via Normanton and Wakefield Westgate with steam haulage throughout. From 2016 the tour ran once a week from Carnforth to Scarborough traveling via Hellifield and Leeds with steam haulage only between York and Scarborough. From 2023 the tour now follows the same routing from 2016 but now runs with steam haulage throughout.

=== Dalesman & Pendle Dalesman ===
In 2014, The Dalesman was brought back after a few years absence. The tour started at York and travelled to Carlisle via Normanton, Wakefield, Leeds, Keighley, Skipton, Hellifield and the Settle & Carlisle line. The tour was diesel-hauled from York to Hellifield where steam traction took over the train and travelled along the Settle and Carlisle line to Carlisle and then back to Hellifield. It had been planned to run only on Thursdays for 2016 but due to a landslip north of Appleby on the Settle and Carlisle line, The Dalesman did not run again until 2017 when the line re-opened.

In 2016, to replace The Dalesman season, a new set of tours of The Scarborough Spa Express were run from Carnforth to Scarborough with steam haulage being between York and Scarborough. Alternating each week the tour would for one week run from Carnforth to York via Hellifield and Keighley and then the following week would run via Preston, Blackburn and Brighouse. As of 2020 these trips are still running in place of the original Scarborough Spa Express trains; the tours start off diesel worked from Carnforth with a steam loco taking over in York.

Following the transfer of The Fellsman to "Saphos Trains" and operation changed to Locomotive Services Limited after the 2018 season, WCR used the path formerly used for Fellsman trains and re-branded it as The Pendle Dalesman. The routing and pickups remain the same, but the pickup at Long Preston has now been dropped.

=== Other Operations ===
From 2009 until 2018, West Coast Railways provided motive power and coaches for The Fellsman which was run by "Statesman Rail", the tour started in Lancaster and ran toCarlisle traveling via the Settle and Carlisle Line. Pickups for the tour included Preston, Bamber Bridge (until 2011), Blackburn, Clitheroe and Long Preston.

In June 2018, West Coast Railways ran a service on the Windermere branch line between Oxenholme and Windermere after Arriva Rail North cancelled all trains on the line in the short term in an attempt to fix the disruption and cancellations around their network.

== Train Operating Company ==
Former companies operated with:

- Vintage Trains (WCR unable to provide crews for tours from start of 2018, trains now operated by Vintage Trains CBS)
- Belmond Royal Scotsman (Contracted ended April 2016 by owners due to running issues with WCR and awarded to GB Railfreight)

== Depots ==
The headquarters and main depot is at Carnforth MPD. The former LMS depot coded 10A has workshops for steam and diesel locomotives, and also carriage and wagon facilities to maintain the company's fleet of Mark 1 and Mark 2 carriages. The site includes extensive sidings plus a paint shop.

The company's second base is the former Great Western Railway depot at Southall Railway Centre in West London which it has occupied since 2008. "The Green Train" is based here, used on "The Cathedrals Express".

For half of the year the company also uses part of Fort William depot as a base for the stock and locomotives for its Jacobite service. The Transport for Wales depot at Machynlleth has also been used previously for the Cambrian trains, but due to the line having the new ETCS system fitted which presently isn't compatible with steam locos the services had to cease.

== Rolling stock ==
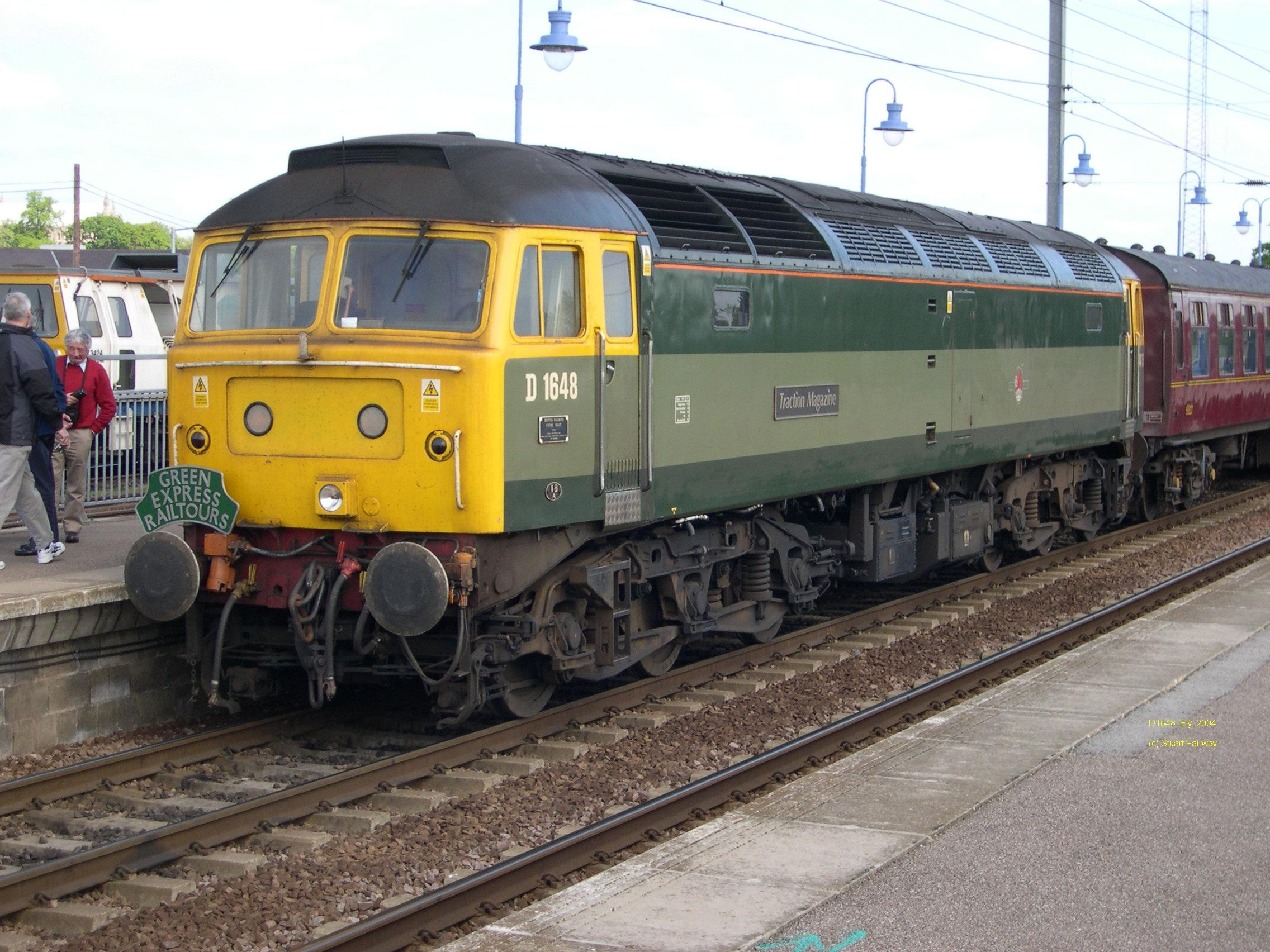
47851 Traction Magazine at Ely with a charter train in British Railways two-tone Green livery

The company owns and operates a fleet of diesel locomotives, which are primarily used to haul charter trains, but have also been hired to other railway operators. The fleet is mainly composed of Class 37 and Class 47 locomotives, but also includes Class 57 locomotives, including the prototype passenger locomotive 57601. Several Class 37 locomotives were purchased from Ian Riley Engineering, which ceased its spot-hire operations in mid-2004.

In 2005, WCR won the contract to haul The Royal Scotsman luxury train. As a result, its two operational Class 37 locomotives and a Class 47 were repainted into a revised maroon livery, officially known as Royal Scotsman Claret, based on that of the Royal Scotsman carriages. In late 2005, WCR sold its two operational Class 37 locomotives (nos. 37197 and 37261) to Direct Rail Services, and received four Class 33 locomotives in exchange. As of 2011, WCR started investing in more Class 57 locomotives, bought from Advenza Freight, Harry Needle Railroad Company, Freightliner and Porterbrook.

The company's coaching stock consists of vacuum and air plus dual braked Mark 1 and Mark 2 coaches, mostly painted in the British Railways maroon livery, albeit with West Coast Railways branding on the bodyside. Some of these coaches were built as British Railways Pullman coaches. Until January 2024 the company's hinged door coaches were locked and unlocked from a simple sliding bolt by one of the train stewards for each coach. West Coast Railways had previously applied for an exemption which was intended to expire on 29 February 2024, however the Office of Road and Rail revoked the exemption with immediate effect from 11 January 2024. Each of the company's coaches which are now operated on the mainline for either steam or diesel railtours now need to be fitted with Central Door Locks operated by a member of staff. With the company needing to supply dual braked Mark 1 and Mark 2 coaches for the full programme of railtours for 2024, West Coast Railways submitted a new exemption application to the ORR in March 2024 to allow the busy summer programme to run as normal for themselves alongside other railtour companys.

== Fleet details ==
=== Steam locomotives ===
Locomotives listed here are not owned by WCR, but are made available to operate on the mainline by their respective owners (assuming they have the appropriate mainline certification).

Some engines may not now be operated on the mainline because their mainline or boiler ticket has expired or may be on display away from the national network. 5972 Olton Hall was on a 2-year loan agreement from November 2014 to the Warner Bros Studio Tour in Leavesden for their Harry Potter tour.

Number	Name	Class	Livery	Owner	TOPS No	Air Brakes	ETCS Fitted	Location	Photograph	Present Status	Mainline Certified	Notes
4936	Kinlet Hall	GWR "Hall" 4-6-0	N/A	Kinlet Hall & Thornbury Castle Ltd	98536	No	No	Tyseley LW		Under Overhaul	No	
5972	Olton Hall	GWR "Hall" 4-6-0	Hogwarts Crimson	David Smith	98572	No	No	Leavesden		Static Display	No	On loan to Warner Bros.
9466	-	GWR "9400 Pannier Tank" 0-6-0PT	BR Black, Early Emblem	Johnathan Jones-Pratt	98466	No	No	Bishops Lydeard		Operational	No	
30777	Sir Lamiel	LSWR N15 4-6-0	BR Green, Early Emblem (on completion)	National Collection	98577	No	No	Loughborough		Under overhaul	No, to be certified	On loan from the National Collection to 5305 Locomotive Association.
34016	Bodmin	SR "West Country" 4-6-2	BR Green, Late Crest	David Smith	98716	No	No	Carnforth MPD		Stored	No	
34028	Eddystone	SR "West Country" 4-6-2	BR Green, Late Crest	Southern Locomotives Limited	98728	Yes	No	Swanage		Operational	Yes (2025-ongoing)	Plan announced in late 2024 for 34028 to be mainline certified in 2025.
34067	Tangmere	SR "Battle of Britain" 4-6-2	BR Green, Late Crest	David Smith	98767	Yes	No	Carnforth MPD		Operational	Yes (2021 - ongoing)	
35018	British India Line	SR "Merchant Navy" 4-6-2	BR Green, Late Crest	David Smith	98818	No	No	Carnforth MPD		Operational	Yes (2017 - ongoing)	
35028	Clan Line	SR "Merchant Navy" 4-6-2	BR Green, Late Crest	Merchant Navy Locomotive Preservation Group	98828	Yes	No	Stewarts Lane		Under Repair	Yes (2017 - ongoing)	
44767	George Stephenson	LMS Stanier Class 5 4-6-0	N/A		98567	No	No	Carnforth MPD		Under Overhaul	No (to be certified)	
44871	-	LMS Stanier Class 5 4-6-0	BR Black, Early Emblem	Riley & Son (E) Ltd	98571	Yes		Bury		Operational	Yes	
44932	-	LMS Stanier Class 5 4-6-0	BR Black, BR Lettering		98532	No	No	Carnforth MPD		Operational	Yes (2022 - ongoing)	Worked inaugural post overhaul railtour on 24 September 2022.
45110	-	LMS Stanier Class 5 4-6-0	BR Black, Late Crest	Private Owner	98510	No	No	Carnforth MPD		Operational	No	Purchased from Severn Valley Railway by private owner in August 2023. Returned to service in May 2026 at Gloucestershire Warwickshire Railway during the Cotswold Festival of Steam.
45163	-	LMS Stanier Class 5 4-6-0	BR Black, Late Crest	45163 Ltd	98563	Yes	No	Bury		Under Restoration	To be certified	To be operated by Riley and Son for a minimum of 25 years following completion of restoration.
45212	-	LMS Stanier Class 5 4-6-0	BR Black, Late Crest	Keighley & Worth Valley Railway	98512	Yes	No	Haworth		Under Overhaul	To be certified	Withdrawn early in September 2025 to the East Lancashire Railway before an overhaul
45305	Alderman A.E Draper	LMS Stanier Class 5 4-6-0	N/A	5305 locomotive Association	98505	No	No	Loughborough		Under overhaul		Planned for mainline use after overhaul
45407	The Lancashire Fusilier	LMS Stanier Class 5 4-6-0	BR Black, Early Emblem	Ian Riley	98507	Yes	No	Bury		Operational	Yes	
45593	Kolhapur	LMS "Jubilee" 4-6-0	LMS Crimson Lake	David Smith	98693	No	No	Carnforth MPD		Stored	No	Purchased from Tyseley by David Smith in May 2024
45596	Bahamas	LMS "Jubilee" 4-6-0	BR Green, Late Crest	Bahamas Locomotive Society	98696	No	No	Haworth		Under Overhaul	No (to be certified)	Only surviving Jubilee with double chimney. Returned to mainline on 15 January 2019.
45690	Leander	LMS "Jubilee" 4-6-0	BR Black, Early Emblem	Chris Beet	98690	No	No	Bury		Undergoing Overhaul	No (2014 - 2023)	Boiler ticket extended from November 2023 to January 2024.
45699	Galatea	LMS "Jubilee" 4-6-0	BR Green, Late Crest		98699	No	No	Carnforth MPD		Operational	Yes (2023 - ongoing)	Returned to service in Jan 2023 working first test run in Feb 2023.
46115	Scots Guardsman	LMS "Royal Scot" 4-6-0	BR Green, Late Crest		98715	No	No	Carnforth MPD		Operational	Yes (2019 - ongoing)	
6201	Princess Elizabeth	LMS "Princess Royal" 4-6-2	LMS Crimson Lake (on completion)	Princess Elizabeth Locomotive Society	98801	Yes	No	Carnforth MPD		Under Overhaul	No, to be certified	Withdrawn in October 2021 with leaks in firebox throat plate. Mainline Standard overhaul commenced in September 2023.
6233	Duchess of Sutherland	LMS "Princess Coronation" 4-6-2	LMS Crimson Lake	Princess Royal Class Loco. Trust	98834	Yes	No	Butterley		Under Overhaul	To be certified	
48151	-	LMS Stanier 8F 2-8-0	BR Black, Late Crest	David Smith	98851	No	No	Carnforth MPD		Operational	Yes (2026 - ongoing)	Undertook first post overhaul test-run on 16 June 2026.
60007	Sir Nigel Gresley	LNER A4 4-6-2	BR Blue	Sir Nigel Gresley Locomotive Trust	98898	Yes	No	Locomotive Services Ltd		Operational	Yes (2022 - ongoing)	Worked inaugural post overhaul railtour on 21 May 2022. No longer operated by WCR
60103	Flying Scotsman	LNER A3 4-6-2	BR Green, Late Crest	National Collection	98872	Yes	No	York NRM		Operational	Yes	Recently involved in shunting incident at Strathspey Railway on 29 September 2023.
60163	Tornado	LNER A1 4-6-2	BR Lined Green, Late Crest	A1 Steam Locomotive Trust	98863	Yes	Yes	Loughborough		Operational	Yes	Fitted with ETCS as part of Pathfinder Project. No longer operated by WCR due to a disagreement
1264	-	LNER B1 4-6-0	LNER Lined Black	Thompson B1 Loco Trust	98564	No	No	Ruddington		Under Overhaul		
62005	-	LNER K1 2-6-0	N/A	NELPG	98605	No	No	Carnforth MPD		Under Overhaul	No, to be certified	
70013	Oliver Cromwell	BR Standard Class 7 4-6-2	BR Green, Late Crest (on completion)	National Collection	98713	No	No	Loughborough		Under Overhaul	No, to be certified	Overhaul anticipated for completion in 2024. (Now 2026)
76017	-	BR Standard Class 4 2-6-0	BR Black, Early Emblem	John Bunch	98417	No	No	Southall MPD		Stored	No, to be certified	Intended to be mainline certified following change of ownership.

=== Modern Traction ===
All locomotives below are owned and operated by West Coast Railways.

==== Diesel locomotives ====
Note: Marked names indicate that the loco is not presently wearing them.

===== Shunting Diesels =====
Number	Class	Name	Livery	Date Acquired	Into Traffic	Previous Operator	Status	ETCS Fitted	Max Speed
D2084	Class 03		BR Green	January 2010	January 2010	ex-Preservation	Depot Shunter	Not Required	15 mph (24 km/h)
03196	Class 03		BR Green	July 2002	July 2002	ex-British Rail	Depot Shunter	Not Required	15 mph (24 km/h)
D2381	Class 03		BR Green	March 1976	March 1976	ex-British Rail	Stored	Not Required	15 mph (24 km/h)
08418	Class 08		EWS Red	August 2010	November 2010	ex-EWS	Stored	Not Required	15 mph (24 km/h)
08485	Class 08		BR Blue	August 2010	September 2010	ex-EWS	Depot Shunter	Not Required	15 mph (24 km/h)
08678	Class 08	Artila	WCR Maroon	November 1994	November 1994	ex-Glaxo, Ulverston	Depot Shunter	Not Required	15 mph (24 km/h)

===== Mainline Diesels =====
Number	Class	Name	Livery	Date Acquired	Into Traffic	Previous Operator	Status	ETCS Fitted	Max Speed	Notes
33025	Class 33		WCR Maroon	September 2005	November 2005	ex-Direct Rail Services	Operational	No	80 mph (130 km/h)	
33029	Class 33		WCR Maroon	September 2005	March 2006	ex-Direct Rail Services	Operational	No	80 mph (130 km/h)	
33207	Class 33	Jim Martin	WCR Maroon	September 2005	November 2005	ex-Direct Rail Services	Operational	No	80 mph (130 km/h)	
37516	Class 37	Loch Laidon	WCR Maroon	February 2009	June 2009	ex-EWS	Operational	No	80 mph (130 km/h)	
37517	Class 37		Loadhaul	December 2007	N/A	ex-EWS	Stored	No	80 mph (130 km/h)	
37518	Class 37	Fort William	WCR Maroon	October 2013	October 2013	ex-Ian Riley	Operational	No	80 mph (130 km/h)	
37668	Class 37		WCR Maroon	December 2007	October 2014	ex-EWS	Operational	Yes	80 mph (130 km/h)	
37669	Class 37		WCR Maroon	March 2011	March 2015	ex-EWS	Operational	Yes	80 mph (130 km/h)	
37676	Class 37	Loch Rannoch	WCR Maroon	November 2007	November 2008	ex-EWS	Operational	No	80 mph (130 km/h)	
37685	Class 37	Loch Arkaig	WCR Maroon	December 2007	May 2010	ex-EWS	Operational	No	80 mph (130 km/h)	
37706	Class 37		WCR Maroon	December 2007	December 2008	ex-EWS	Operational	No	80 mph (130 km/h)	
37712	Class 37		WCR Maroon	December 2007	June 2008	ex-EWS	Stored	No	80 mph (130 km/h)	
47237	Class 47		WCR Maroon	January 2011	July 2011	ex-Advenza Freight	Operational	No	95 mph (153 km/h)	
47245	Class 47	V.E. Day 75th Anniversary	WCR Maroon	April 2004	April 2006	ex-Harry Needle Railroad Company	Operational	No	95 mph (153 km/h)	
47270	Class 47	Swift	BR Blue	May 2010	May 2010	ex-Preservation	Operational	No	95 mph (153 km/h)	
47355	Class 47		FM Rail	May 2010	N/A	ex-European Metal Recycling	Stored	No	95 mph (153 km/h)	
47746	Class 47	Chris Fudge 29.7.70-22.6.10	WCR Maroon	March 2011	October 2013	ex-Preservation (BT4F)	Operational	No	95 mph (153 km/h)	
47760	Class 47		WCR Maroon	February 2007	April 2008	ex-EWS	Operational	No	95 mph (153 km/h)	
47768	Class 47		Undercoat	March 2011	N/A	ex-Preservation	Stored	No	95 mph (153 km/h)	
47772	Class 47	Carnforth TMD	WCR Maroon	June 2008	August 2017	ex-EWS	Operational	No	95 mph (153 km/h)	
47776	Class 47		Rail Express Systems	February 2007	N/A	ex-EWS	Stored	No	95 mph (153 km/h)	
47786	Class 47	Roy Castle OBE	WCR Maroon	February 2007	October 2008	ex-EWS	Operational	No	95 mph (153 km/h)	
47787	Class 47		WCR Maroon	February 2007	February 2008	ex-EWS	Under repair	No	95 mph (153 km/h)	
47802	Class 47		WCR Maroon	September 2014	August 2015	ex-Direct Rail Services	Operational	No	95 mph (153 km/h)	
47804	Class 47		WCR Maroon	February 2007	June 2007	ex-EWS	Operational	No	95 mph (153 km/h)	
47812	Class 47		WCR Maroon	April 2021	N/A	ex-Rail Operations Group	Operational	No	95 mph (153 km/h)	
47813	Class 47		WCR Maroon	April 2021	April 2021	ex-Rail Operations Group	Operational	No	95 mph (153 km/h)	
47815	Class 47	Great Western	BR two-tone Green	April 2021	April 2021	ex-Rail Operations Group	Operational	No	95 mph (153 km/h)	
47826	Class 47		WCR Maroon	April 2005	June 2005	ex-Virgin CrossCountry	Operational	No	95 mph (153 km/h)	
47832	Class 47		WCR Maroon	September 2014	October 2014	ex-Direct Rail Services	Operational	No	95 mph (153 km/h)	
47848	Class 47		WCR Maroon	April 2021	April 2021	ex Rail Operations Group	Operational	No	95 mph (153 km/h)	
47851	Class 47		WCR Maroon	April 2005	June 2005	ex-Virgin CrossCountry	Operational	No	95 mph (153 km/h)	
47854	Class 47	Diamond Jubilee	WCR Maroon	June 2003	February 2004	ex-Virgin CrossCountry	Operational	No	95 mph (153 km/h)	
57001	Class 57/0		WCR Maroon	January 2011	March 2011	ex-Freightliner	Awaiting repair	No	75 mph (121 km/h)	
57005	Class 57/0		Advenza Freight Blue	January 2011	N/A	ex-Advenza Freight	Stored	No	75 mph (121 km/h)	
57006	Class 57/0		WCR Maroon	April 2011	June 2012	ex-Advenza Freight	Awaiting repair	No	75 mph (121 km/h)	
57008	Class 57/0		DRS Blue	March 2022	N/A	ex-Direct Rail Services	Stored	No	75 mph (121 km/h)	
57009	Class 57/0		DRS Blue	March 2022	N/A	ex-Direct Rail Services	Stored	No	75 mph (121 km/h)	
57010	Class 57/0		WCR Maroon	March 2022	N/A	ex-Direct Rail Services	Operational	No	75 mph (121 km/h)	
57011	Class 57/0		DRS Blue	March 2022	N/A	ex-Direct Rail Services	Stored	No	75 mph (121 km/h)	
57012	Class 57/0		WCR Maroon	March 2022	N/A	ex-Direct Rail Services	Operational	No	75 mph (121 km/h)	
57313	Class 57/3	Scarborough Castle	Pullman	January 2013	April 2013	ex-Porterbrook	Operational	No	95 mph (153 km/h)	Formerly named Tracy Island.
57314	Class 57/3		WCR Maroon	January 2013	April 2013	ex-Porterbrook	Operational	No	95 mph (153 km/h)	Formerly named Firefly
57315	Class 57/3		WCR Maroon	January 2013	March 2013	ex-Porterbrook	Operational	No	95 mph (153 km/h)	Formerly named The Mole
57316	Class 57/3	Alnwick Castle	WCR Maroon	January 2013	March 2013	ex-Porterbrook	Operational	No	95 mph (153 km/h)	Formerly named FAB1.
57601	Class 57/6	Windsor Castle	Pullman	November 2003	February 2004	ex-Porterbrook	Operational	No	95 mph (153 km/h)	

=== Preserved locomotives ===
Bold = Current number

Number Pre-TOPS	Number TOPS	Class	Name	Livery	Owner	Status	Location	Photograph	Notes
**D345**	40145	Class 40		BR Green	Class 40 Preservation Society	Operational	East Lancashire Railway		
D1762	**47580**	Class 47	County of Essex	BR Blue (with Union Jack)	Stratford 47 Group	Operational	Mid Norfolk railway		
D407	**50007**	Class 50	Hercules	BR Large Logo	Class 50 Alliance	Operational	Kidderminster		
D444	50044	Class 50	Exeter	GB Railfreight	Class 50 Alliance	Operational	Kidderminster		
D449	**50049**	Class 50	Defiance	BR Large Logo	Class 50 Alliance	Operational	Kidderminster		
**D1015**	~	Class 52	Western Champion	BR Chromatic Blue	Diesel Traction Group	Operational	Kidderminster		
**E3137**	86259	Class 86	Les Ross	BR Electric Blue	Les Ross	Operational	Rugby		Named Les Ross on one side & Peter Pan on the other.
E3199	**86401**	Class 86	Mons Meg	Caledonian Blue	David Smith	Operational	Carnforth MPD		Purchased in February 2020 from AC Locomotive Group

== See also ==
- Accidents and incidents involving West Coast Railways
