= LMS Stanier Class 5 4-6-0 5000 =

LMS 5000
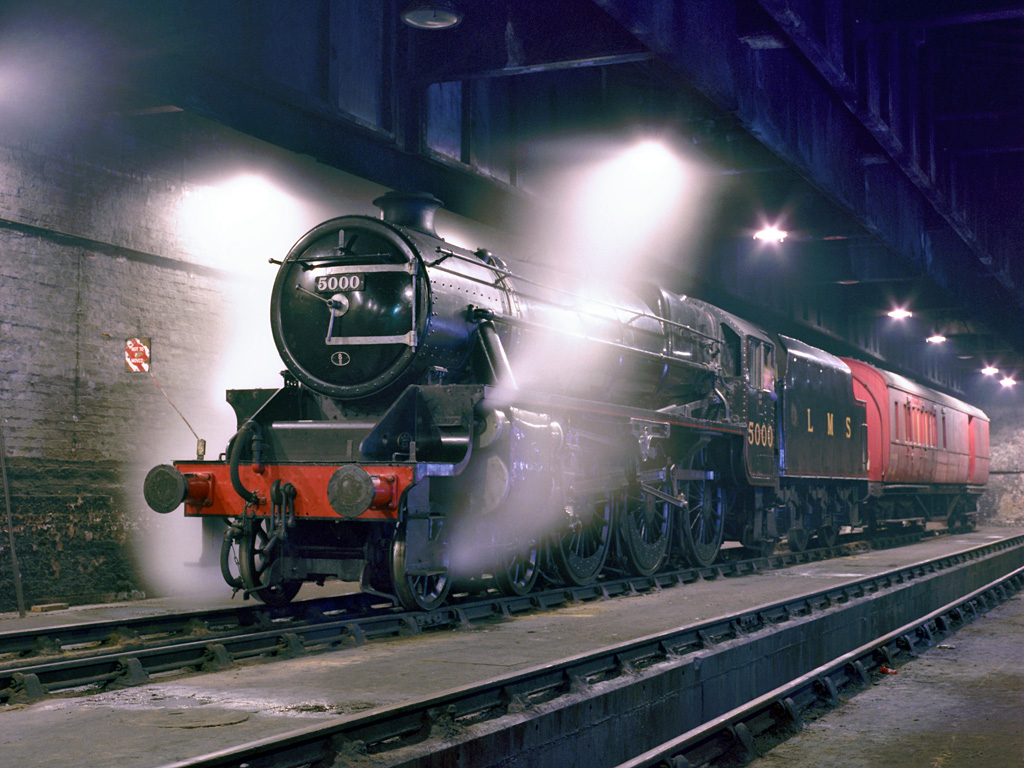
- No. 5000 in 1982
Type and origin
- Power type: Steam
- Designer: William Stanier
- Builder: LMS Crewe Works
- Build date: March 1935
Specifications
- Configuration
  - Whyte: 4-6-0
  - UIC: 2′C h2
- Gauge: 4 ft 8 1/2 in (1,435 mm)
- Leading dia.: 3 ft 3 1/2 in (1.003 m)
- Coupled dia.: 6 ft 0 in (1.829 m)
- Length
  - Over beams: 63 ft 8 in (19.41 m)
- Width: 8 ft 8 in (2.64 m)
- Height: 12 ft 10 1/2 in (3.92 m)
- Fuel capacity: 9 long tons (9.1 t; 10 short tons)
- Water cap.: 4,000 imp gal (18,000 L; 4,800 US gal)
- Firebox
  - Type: Belpaire
  - Grate area: 27 3/4 sq ft (2.58 m^{2})
- Boiler
  - Model: LMS type 3B
  - Type: Domeless
- Boiler pressure: 225 lbf/in^{2} (1.55 MPa)
- Safety valve: Pop
- Heating surface
  - Firebox: 156 sq ft (14.5 m^{2})
  - Tubes and flues: 1,426 sq ft (132.5 m^{2})
- Superheater
  - Heating area: 228 sq ft (21.2 m^{2})
- Cylinders: Two, outside
- Cylinder size: 18 1/2 in × 28 in (470 mm × 711 mm)
- Valve gear: Walschaerts
- Valve type: Piston valves
- Loco brake: Vacuum
- Safety systems: AWS, TPWS, OTMR, GSMR
Performance figures
- Maximum speed: 25 mph - (heritage railways) 45 mph - (mainline, tender first) 60 mph - (mainline, chimney first)
- Tractive effort: 25,455 lbf (113.23 kN)
Career
- Operators: London, Midland and Scottish Railway; British Railways
- Class: Class 5
- Power class: LMS: 5P5F; BR: 5MT
- Numbers: 5000 (LMS); 45000 (BR)
- Withdrawn: October 1967
- Disposition: Preserved at the National Railway Museum

LMS Stanier Class 5 4-6-0 number 5000 is a preserved British steam locomotive. It is part of the National Railway Collection.

== Service ==
5000 was built at Crewe in 1935 and was initially the first numerically of its class. It however was not the first to be built because the Vulcan Foundry had turned out the first of their simultaneous order, No. 5020 in 1934. It also ceased to be the first numerically when No. 4800 was built in 1944, after the LMS ran out of available numbers after No. 5499 was built.

5000 was built with a low degree superheat domeless boiler.

5000 had 40000 added to its number to become 45000 after nationalisation in 1948 by British Railways.

== Preservation ==
After withdrawal from Lostock Hall shed, near Preston in 1967, 5000 was selected to represent its 842-strong class as part of the National Railway Collection. Part of the reason for this was that it had a domeless boiler and was roughly in the condition as built. It was therefore painted in its original LMS lined black livery. However, there had been changes over its lifetime and as a result there are numerous detail differences between 5000 as built and 5000 as preserved.

5000 was steamed on the Severn Valley Railway and on the mainline in preservation. In 1980, 5000 attended The Rocket 150 celebrations at Rainhill, where she hauled a short mixed goods which included 2 flatwagons carrying a replica of the engine Novelty, & The Earl from the Welshpool and Llanfair Railway, which at the time was on loan to the NRM before returning to Welshpool by the late 1990s. Since its boiler certificate expired in 1990, it has been restricted to being a static exhibit and as of January 2016 it is on display at the Shildon Locomotion Museum in County Durham.
