= LMS Stanier Class 5 4-6-0 4871 =

Preserved British steam locomotive

LMS 44871
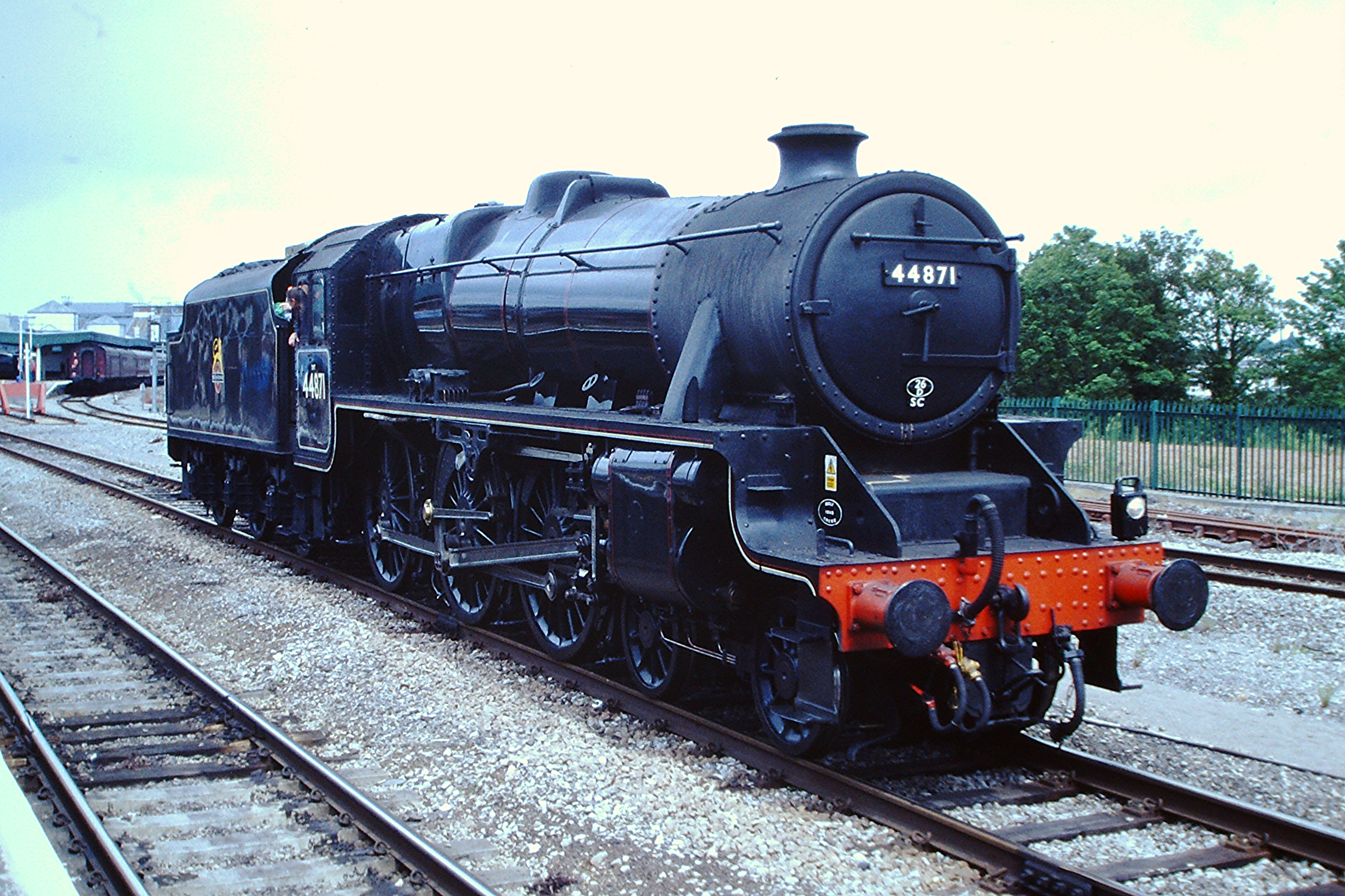
Type and origin
- Power type: Steam
- Designer: William Stanier
- Builder: Crewe Works
- Serial number: 170 (second series)
- Build date: March 1945
- Total produced: 842
Specifications
- Configuration
  - Whyte: 4-6-0
- Gauge: 4 ft 8 1/2 in (1,435 mm)
- Leading dia.: 3 ft 3 1/2 in (1.003 m)
- Driver dia.: 6 ft 0 in (1.829 m)
- Length: 63 ft 7 3/4 in (19.40 m)
- Fuel type: Coal
- Fuel capacity: 9 long tons (9.1 t; 10.1 short tons)
- Water cap.: 4,000 imp gal (18,000 L; 4,800 US gal)
- Firebox
  - Grate area: 28 1/2 sq ft (2.65 m^{2})
- Boiler: LMS type 3C
- Boiler pressure: 225 lbf/in^{2} (1.55 MPa)
- Cylinders: Two, outside
- Cylinder size: 18 1/2 in × 28 in (470 mm × 711 mm)
- Valve gear: Walschaerts
- Valve type: Piston valves
- Loco brake: Vacuum (Air Brakes fitted)
- Safety systems: AWS, TPWS, OTMR, GSMR
Performance figures
- Maximum speed: 25mph - (heritage railways) 45mph - (mainline, tender first) 60mph - (mainline, chimney first)
- Tractive effort: 25,455 lbf (113.23 kN)
Career
- Operators: London, Midland and Scottish Railway; → British Railways
- Power class: LMS: 5P5F; BR: 5MT
- Numbers: LMS 4871
- Axle load class: BR: Route Availability 7
- Withdrawn: August 1968
- Current owner: Ian Riley & Son
- Disposition: Operational, Mainline Certified

LMS Stanier Class 5 4-6-0 No. 44871 is a preserved British steam locomotive. It was built at Crewe Works in 1945.

== Service history ==
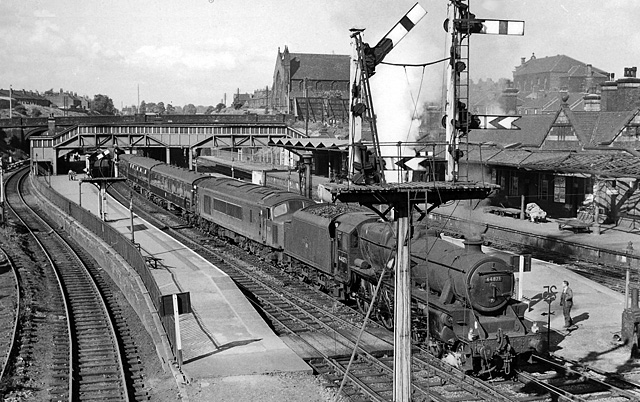
44871 in service at Rotherham

4871 is an LMS Stanier Class 5 4-6-0 locomotive, originally numbered 4871 entering service with the London, Midland and Scottish Railway (LMS) in March 1945 and having 40000 added to its number under British Railways after nationalisation in 1948.

44871 was one of the last steam locomotives to be withdrawn from service, surviving until August 1968, the last year of steam on British Rail.

She was also one of four locomotives chosen (among two other members of her class) to take part in the famous Fifteen Guinea Special on Sun 11 August 1968. 44871 was in-charge of the Carlisle Citadel to Manchester Victoria leg of the tour which went south down the Settle and Carlisle Line. On this leg of the tour she double headed with 44781, 44871 acted as the pilot engine with 44781 being the train engine. 44871 is one of the three locomotives from that train to survive into preservation, the others being 45110 and 70013 Oliver Cromwell.

Shed allocations
| Location | Shed code | From |
|---|---|---|
| Longsight | 9A | 1 August 1948 |
| Crewe North | 5A | 6 October 1951 |
| Holyhead | 7C | 26 January 1952 |
| Crewe North | 5A | 14 June 1952 |
| Stoke | 5D | 12 July 1952 |
| Crewe North | 5A | 3 October 1953 |
| Stoke | 5D | 31 October 1953 |
| Crewe South | 5B | 22 March 1958 |
| Stoke | 5D | 18 June 1960 |
| Stockport Edgeley | 9B | 1 December 1962 |
| Trafford Park | 9E | 22 June 1963 |
| Stockport Edgeley | 9B | 6 November 1965 |
| Bolton | 9K | 11 May 1968 |
| Carnforth | 10A | 6 July 1968 |

== Preservation ==
44871 was purchased directly from British Rail service for preservation, and so never had to be restored from scrapyard condition unlike other preserved locomotives which were sent to Barry Island. The majority of the Class 5s were purchased directly for preservation, with only six being purchased from Barry Island and thus requiring restoration to run again.

Following withdrawal from revenue service 44871 remained at Carnforth, which would later become the Steamtown museum. Once the ban on operating steam locomotives over the national network was lifted in 1972, 44871 was used to operate mainline trains to places like York. It was during this period that she was given the name Sovereign. 44871 was also a popular engine in Scotland, working trains along the West Highland Line from Fort William to Mallaig (which she still runs decades later) working West Coast Railways "Jacobite trains" for most of the year, alongside sister No. 45407 The Lancashire Fusilier and LNER K1 No. 62005.

Following years of storage and the death of her owner in 2006, 44871 was purchased by Ian Riley and was taken to Bury for an overhaul to mainline standards. She returned to steam in 2009 and later undertook light and loaded test runs on the mainline alongside use on WCR's "Jacobite" trains. In the summer of 2010, she worked the final season of WCR's "Cambrian" trains along the Cambrian Line from Machynlleth to Pwllheli (the trains on Monday, Wednesday, and Friday ran to Pwllheli while the trains on Tuesday Thursday ran to Porthmadog). It isn't currently possible to run steam trains down the Cambrian Line since they are incompatible with the new ERTMS system that was put in place.

In August 2010, 44871 was featured in an episode of Coronation Street where she hauled Roy and Hayley Cropper's wedding train. 44871 carried 45407's "Lancashire Fusilier" nameplates for the occasion.

== Current status ==
44871 is based at the East Lancashire Railway alongside sibling No. 45407 The Lancashire Fusilier, both of which are mainline certified regular used for West Coast Railways Jacobite along the West Highland Line from Fort William to Mallaig and back. She returned to service in August 2017 following the completion of another heavy overhaul which was done to mainline standards as before.

In Summer 2021, 44871 was hired by the North Yorkshire Moors Railway, working between Whitby and Pickering, North Yorkshire.

== Gallery ==
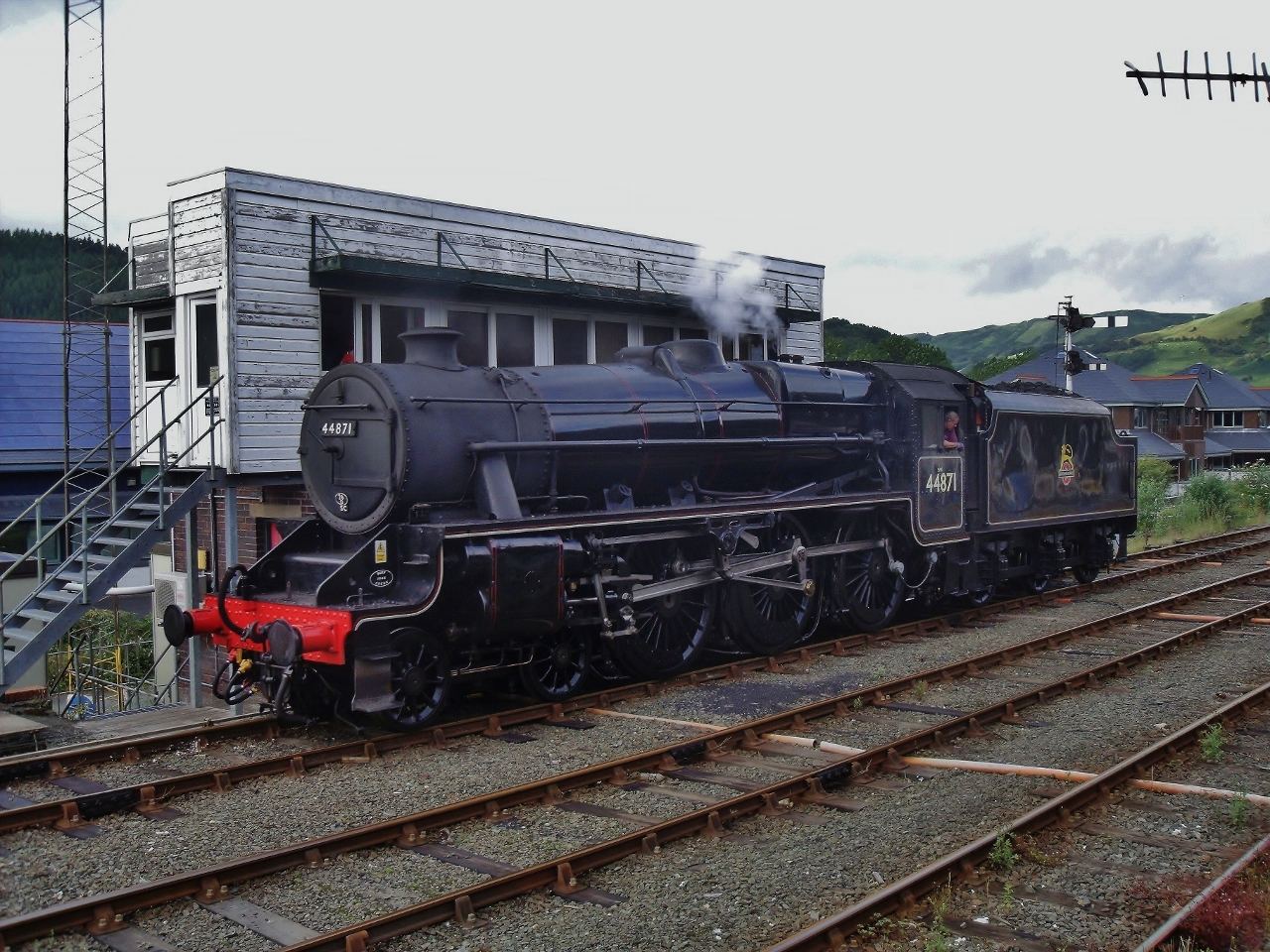
44871 Running around her train at Machynlleth in Jul 2010.

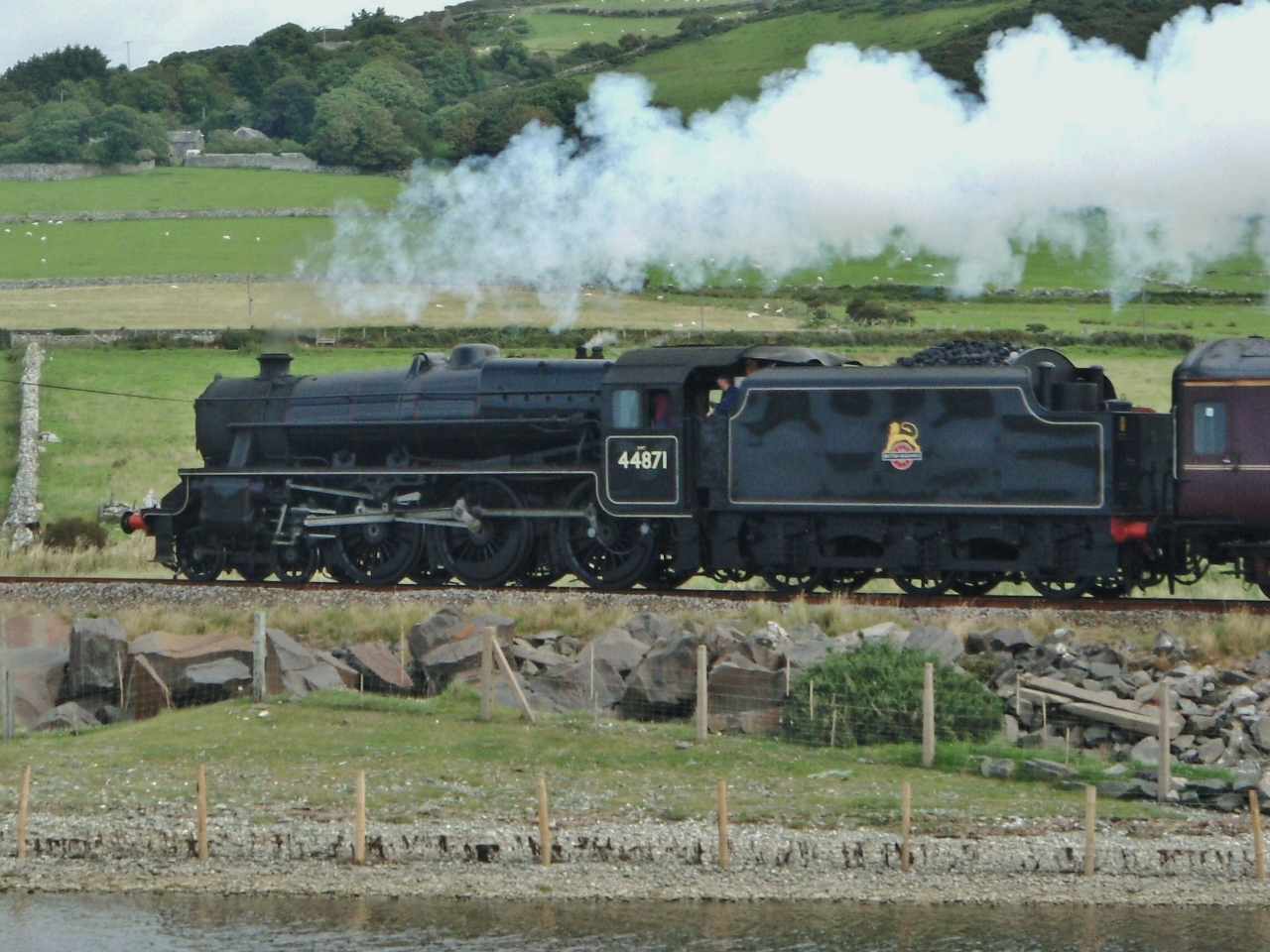
44871 Working down the Cambrian Line to Pwllheli.

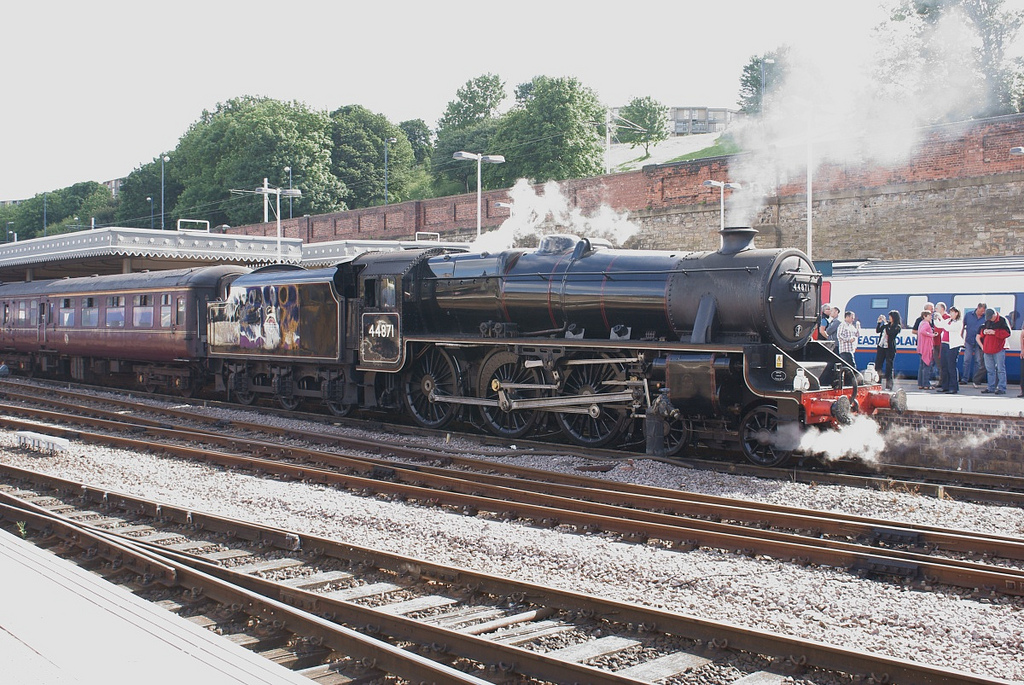
44871 at Sheffield on 12 June 2010.

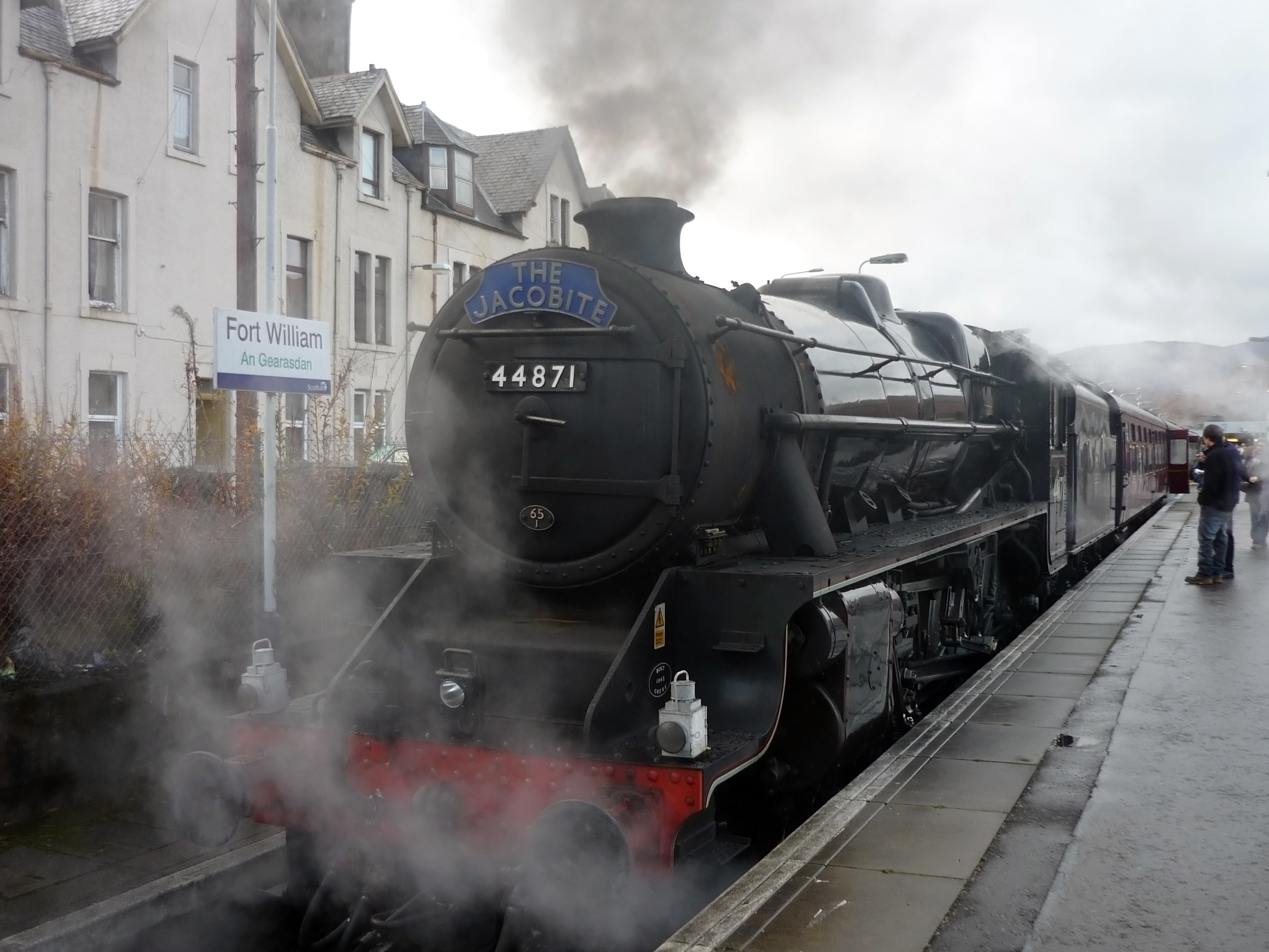
44871 at Fort William with The Jacobite.

== Bibliography ==
- Rowledge, John Westbury Peter; Reed, Brian (1977). The Stanier 4-6-0s of the LMS : (the Jubilees, Class 5s, and the BR Standard Class 5s). David & Charles. ISBN 0-7153-7385-4. OCLC 1256510000.
