= Riley & Son =

British railway engineering company

- Founded: 1992
- Founder: Ian Riley
- Headquarters: Bury, England
- Services: Railway locomotive engineering
- Owner: Ian Riley
- Website: www.rileysuk.com

Riley & Son (E) Ltd, is a railway locomotive engineering and refurbishment company. Founded in 1992 as Ian Riley Engineering, the company has been a leader in main line steam haulage, being one of the pioneers of fitting air brake, TPWS and OTMR equipment to steam locomotives. Having originally been based at the East Lancashire Railway in Bury, in 2016 it moved to Heywood.

== Spot hire company ==
In the early 2000s, Ian Riley Engineering operated as a spot-hire company purchasing five Class 37s diesel locomotives (37038, 37197, 37235, 37261 and 37423) from EWS. The first (37197) entered service in a brunswick green and grey livery in November 2001. All were sold in 2003/04 to Direct Rail Services and West Coast Railways.

== Notable projects ==
=== Flying Scotsman ===
In January 2006, work began at the National Railway Museum on an overhaul of Flying Scotsman that was expected to take 18-20 months and cost £1.6 million. However costs and timescales grew out of control and there were tensions between the museum and its contractors. In 2013 Riley & Son were awarded a contract to see the project to completion. The work was finished in 2016. Riley & Son managed the locomotive's operations for two years after the restoration.

=== Lady of Legend ===
In 2006, the company worked on the rebuilding of GWR 4900 Class locomotive 4942 Maindy Hall to 2999 Lady of Legend.
