= Mongul (disambiguation) =

Mongul is a character appearing in DC Comics.

Mongul or Monghul may also refer to:

- Moghol people, ethnic group in Afghanistan
  - Moghol language, Mongolic language of Afghanistan
