= Mogul =

Mogul may refer to:

== History ==
- Mughal Empire, or any member of its ruling dynasty
- Vicar Apostolic of Great Mogul, now the Roman Catholic Archdiocese of Bombay

== Persons ==
- Magnate
  - Business magnate, a prominent person in a particular industry
  - Media mogul, a person who controls, either through personal ownership or a dominant position, any media enterprise
- Mogul, the Secret Service codename for US president Donald Trump

== Technology ==
- Mogul (website), a social media network for women to share information
- Mogul lamp, a floor lamp with several sources of illumination
- HTC Mogul, a Windows Mobile 6.0/6.1 device
- IHC Mogul, an early tractor by International Harvester
- Starch mogul, a machine that moulds jelly beans or gummy candies in trays filled with cornstarch.

== Entertainment ==
- The Troubleshooters (British TV series), or Mogul, a British television series made by the BBC between 1965 and 1972
- The Moguls, a 2005 comedy film written and directed by Michael Traeger
- Indy Mogul, a DIY film making blog/forum site and series of podcasts/videos
- Mogul (film), an upcoming Indian biographical film
- Grosso mogul (Great Moghul), violin concerto by Antonio Vivaldi

=== Video game ===
- Baseball Mogul, a 1997 series of baseball simulation computer games created by Clay Dreslough
- Casino Mogul, a 2002 economic simulation game for Windows
- Hollywood Mogul, a computer game released in 1997 that allows players to take charge of a movie studio

== Transport ==
- Mogul, name for the 2-6-0 steam locomotive wheel arrangement
  - Mogul, the name of the first locomotive of GER Class 527, and the first 2-6-0 to be built for use in Great Britain
  - GWR Churchward Mogul, alternative name for the GWR 4300 Class built by the Great Western Railway from 1911
  - LMS Hughes Crab or Horwich Mogul, a class of mixed traffic 2-6-0 steam locomotive built between 1926 and 1932
  - LMS Stanier Mogul, a class of 2-6-0 mixed traffic steam locomotive (built 1933–1934)

== Other ==
- Mogul skiing, a freestyle skiing competition where skiers ski down a steep course of bumps or moguls
- MOGUL framework, Modular Online Growth and Use of Language: a processing-based research framework for investigating languages in the mind
- Mogul, Nevada, a small town in the United States
- Federal-Mogul, an automotive parts supplier based in Southfield, Michigan, US
- Project Mogul, a US military listening project using high altitude balloons
- Mogul (horse) (born 2017), Thoroughbred racehorse
- Mogul, a software package for data-mining crystallographic databases, distributed by the Cambridge Crystallographic Data Centre

== See also ==
- Mughal (disambiguation)
- Moghuls (disambiguation)
- Mogol (disambiguation)
- Mongols, one or several ethnic groups
