= Fifteen Guinea Special =

Last British main-line train pulled by steam locomotives

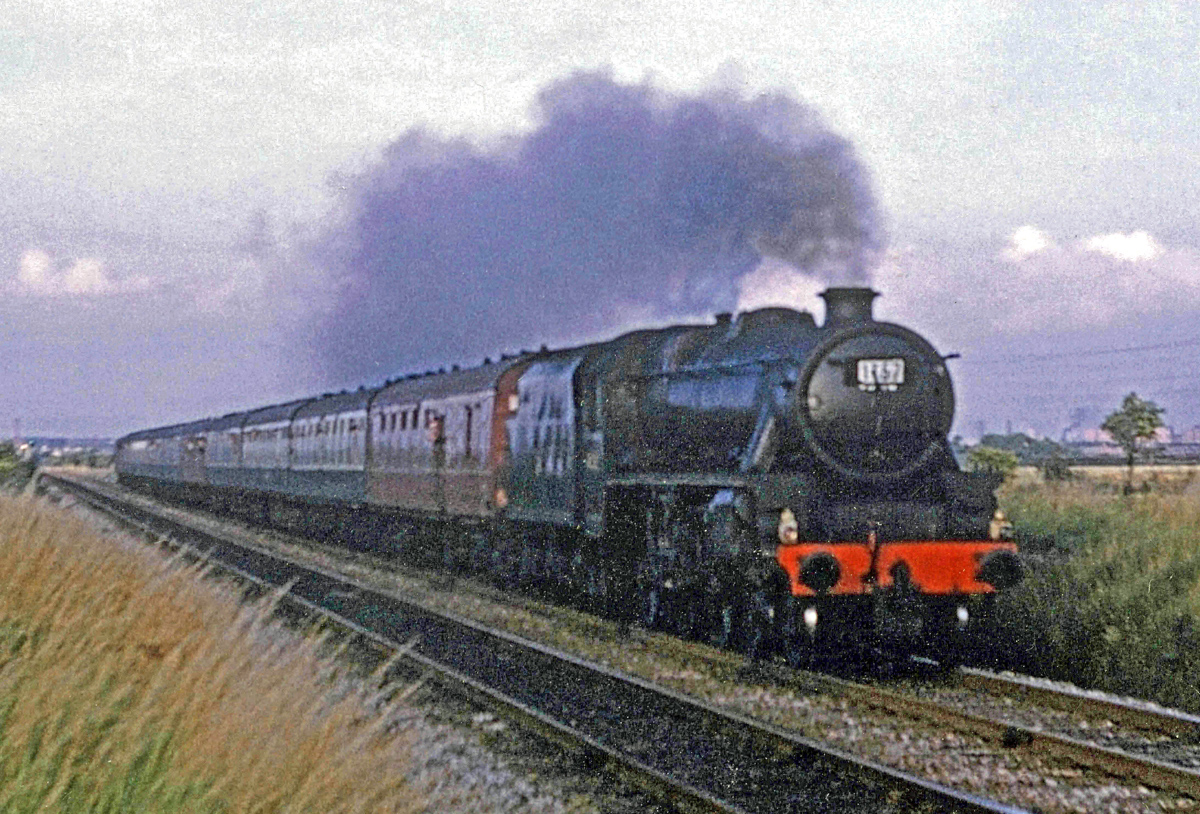
- The Fifteen Guinea Special at Barton Moss on the last leg from Manchester Victoria to Liverpool Lime Street hauled by 45110

Overview
- Service type: Passenger train
- First service: 11 August 1968
- Current operator: British Rail

Route
- Termini: Liverpool Lime Street; Liverpool Lime Street
- Stops: Manchester Victoria; Carlisle; Manchester Victoria
- Train number: 1T57

Technical
- Rolling stock: 45110; 70013; 44871; 44781; British Railways Mark 1

The Fifteen Guinea Special was the last main-line passenger train to be hauled by steam locomotive power on British Rail on 11 August 1968 before the introduction of a steam ban that started the following day, the extra day added to allow for the movement of locomotive BR Standard Class 7 70013 Oliver Cromwell to Bressingham Steam Museum. It was a special rail tour excursion train organised for the occasion from Liverpool Lime Street via Manchester Victoria to Carlisle and back, and was pulled in turn by four steam locomotives during the four legs of the journey (with two engines sharing the third leg). The last scheduled standard gauge steam-hauled passenger services had run on 3 August 1968 from Preston. Steam continued to be used on the narrow gauge Vale of Rheidol Railway under British Rail, which was subsequently privatised in 1989.

== Reason for name ==
The Fifteen Guinea Special was so named because of the high cost of tickets for the rail tour (15 guineas = £15 15s in pre-decimal British currency). Guinea prices were normally only used for luxury items or professional fees and ticket prices had been inflated due to the high demand to travel on the last B.R. steam-hauled main line train.

== 1968 route and locomotives ==
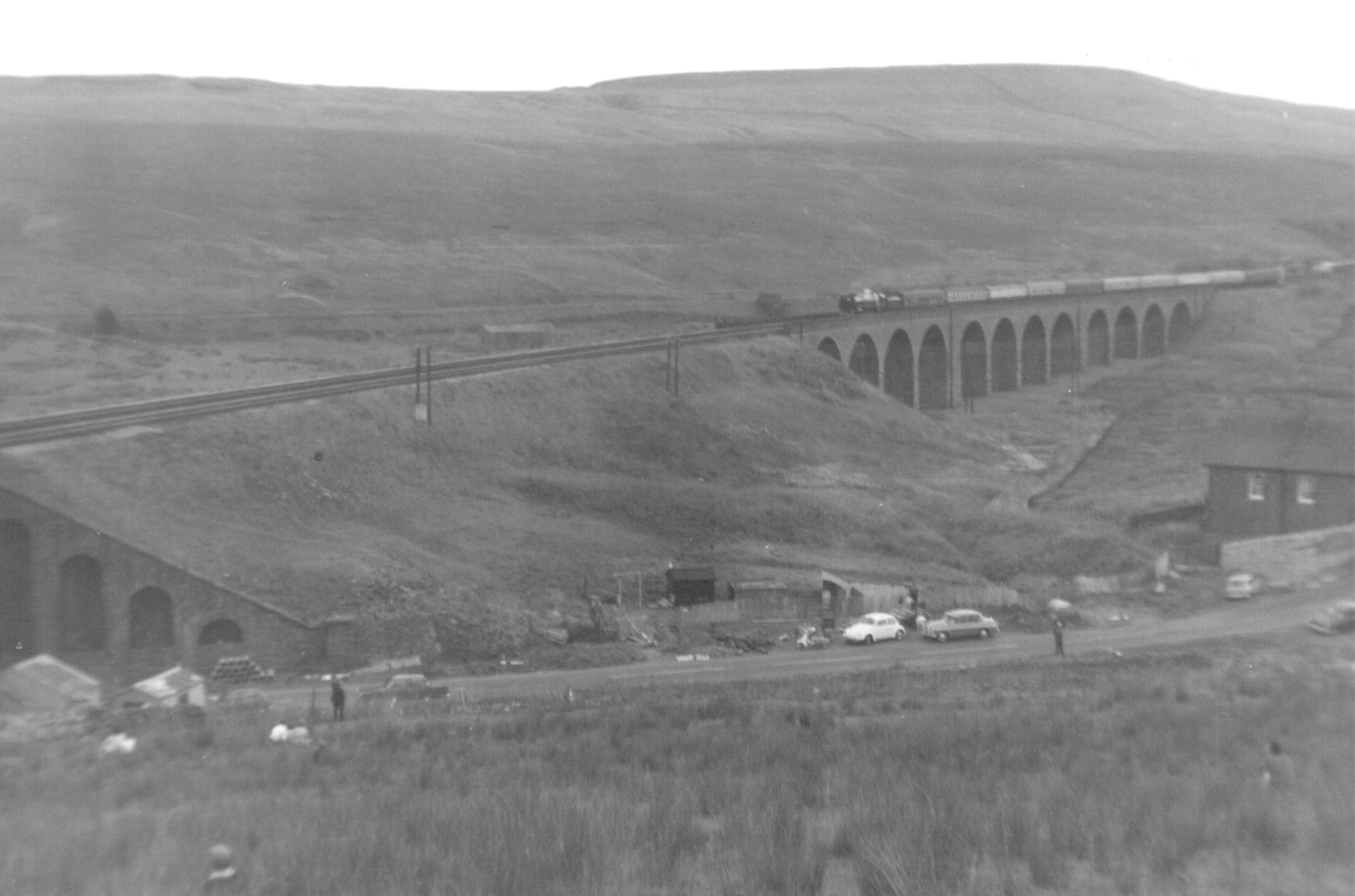
Britannia Class 70013 Oliver Cromwell working the northbound leg of 1T57 at Garsdale

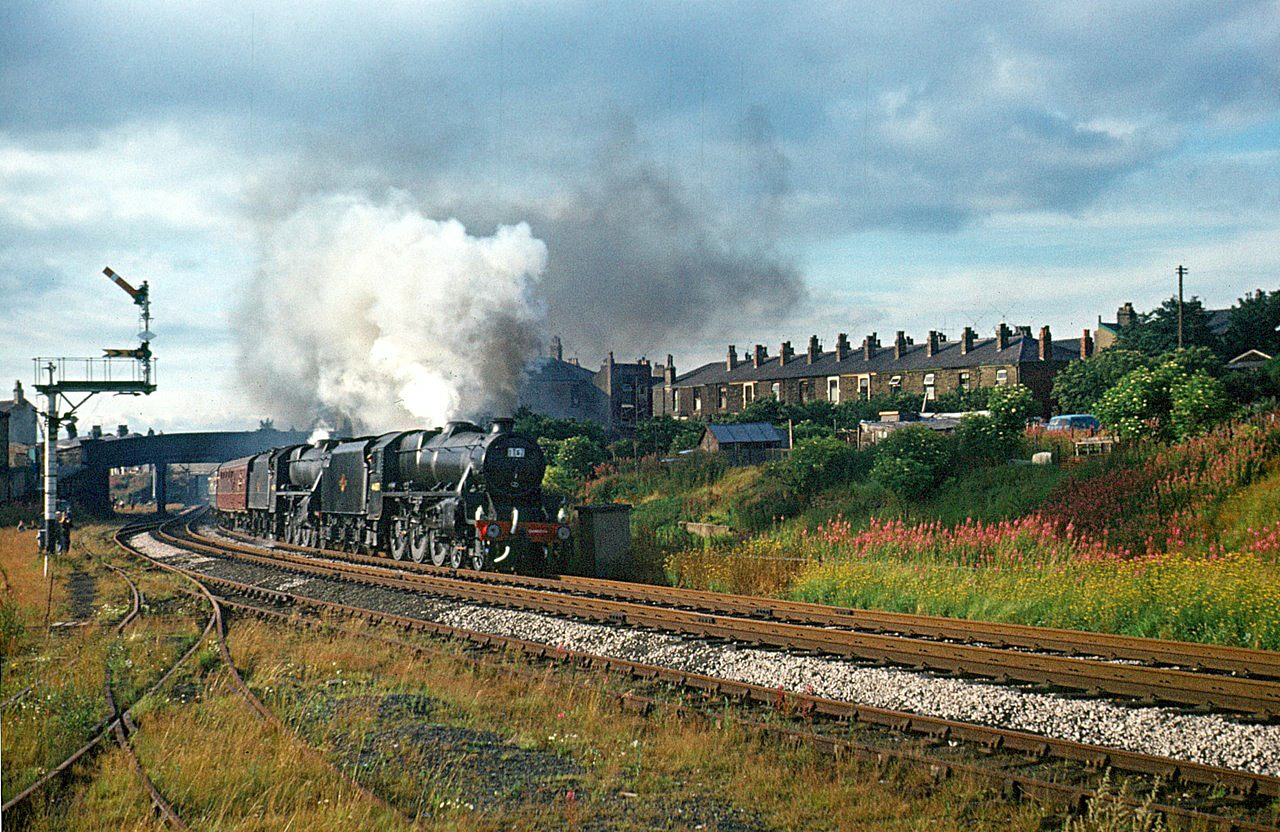
Black 5 Class's 44871 and 44781 passing through Spring Vale working the return leg of 1T57

The Railtour started at 09:10 from Liverpool Lime Street station. The coaches were hauled by LMS Class 5 locomotive 45110, a late replacement for the original rostered engine, No. 45305, which had failed the night before with a collapsed firebox brick arch, to Manchester Victoria, arriving 8 minutes late at 10:42. There, 45110 was replaced with Britannia Class 70013 Oliver Cromwell – the last steam locomotive to be overhauled by B.R. – and the train departed for Carlisle at 11:06. The train arrived at Carlisle, 33 minutes late, at 15:29.

For the first part of the return leg, two Stanier Class 5 4-6-0 locomotives, Nos. 44781 and 44871, double-headed the train back to Manchester Victoria. The train departed Carlisle at 15:44 – 14 minutes late – and arrived in Manchester at 19:00, 12 minutes late.

Re-joining the train at Victoria station, No. 45110 then worked the remainder of the journey back to Liverpool Lime Street, arriving only 9 minutes late at 19:59.

== Significance of the run ==
The end of steam-hauled trains on British Railways was a turning point in the history of rail travel in Britain. The BR steam ban was introduced on 12 August 1968, the day after the railtour, to enable Oliver Cromwell to make one last positioning run back to Norwich and on to Diss for preservation. This made the Fifteen Guinea Special the last steam-hauled passenger train to be run by BR on its standard gauge network, although BR would continue to operate three steam locomotives on the narrow gauge Vale of Rheidol line until it was privatised in 1989, and Northern Ireland Railways would continue to operate steam locomotives until 1971. Thereafter, all main line trains in Britain would be hauled by either diesel or electric power. The ban did not apply to one main line steam locomotive – 4472 Flying Scotsman, due to Alan Pegler having secured a clause in the purchase contract when it was purchased from BR in 1963. After this, the only opportunity to view main line steam locos in operation after the ban was to be on privately owned heritage railways.

Several other railtours had already marked the end of steam haulage on other parts of the British railway network. During most of these rail tours, the Fifteen Guinea Special included, the line was flanked with large crowds due to the high level of interest generated by their impending withdrawal and by the popularity of steam engines amongst rail enthusiasts. There was also a general belief that it was highly unlikely that steam would ever be allowed back onto the network, although in the event steam specials on BR lines were reintroduced only three years later. Since the "return to steam" with an inaugural special hauled by 6000 King George V in 1971, privately run charters have been allowed to use the main line by arrangement provided that the steam locomotive has received necessary certification.

== Preservation of the locomotives ==
All but one of the locomotives that hauled the train were immediately purchased straight from service and passed into preservation.

45110 is now privately owned and until August 2023 was based on the Severn Valley Railway. For a while it carried the name RAF Biggin Hill, but has since had its nameplates removed. As of May 2026, 45110 is currently operational but not mainline certified. 45110 is on a six month loan to the Gloucestershire Warwickshire Railway following its debut gala appearance courtesy of its owner West Coast Railways.

While not purchased straight from service, 45305, the loco replaced by 45110, was also preserved after being sold to Albert Drapers and Sons Ltd. of Hull, where the scrapyard's owner, Albert Draper, saved the loco simply because it was the cleanest engine in the yard. Named Alderman A.E. Draper in preservation after the scrapyard owner who saved it, the loco is under the care of 5305 Locomotive Association, currently based at the Great Central Railway at Loughborough.

70013 Oliver Cromwell is now part of the National Collection and was restored to main line running in 2008, being based on the Great Central Railway when not on the main line.

44871, owned by Ian Riley, is currently main line operational and resides on the East Lancashire Railway.

The only locomotive not preserved was LMS Black 5 no 44781, which was used for filming of the film The Virgin Soldiers at Bartlow, for which it was derailed and hung at an angle for visual effect. After filming was completed, an antique dealer enthusiast from Saffron Walden purchased it, but was unable to find the amount quoted by BR to recover the engine and re-rail it. It was then sold for scrap to Kings of Norwich and cut up on site.

As well as the three locomotives, two Mark 1 TSO coaches used in the train, 4933 and 4937, have also been preserved on the East Lancashire Railway at Bury, itself not too far away from the route of the original rail tour, and are both currently in passenger use in British Rail Blue & Grey livery, which both vehicles were painted in on the original run.

== Anniversary Re-runs 2008–2013 ==
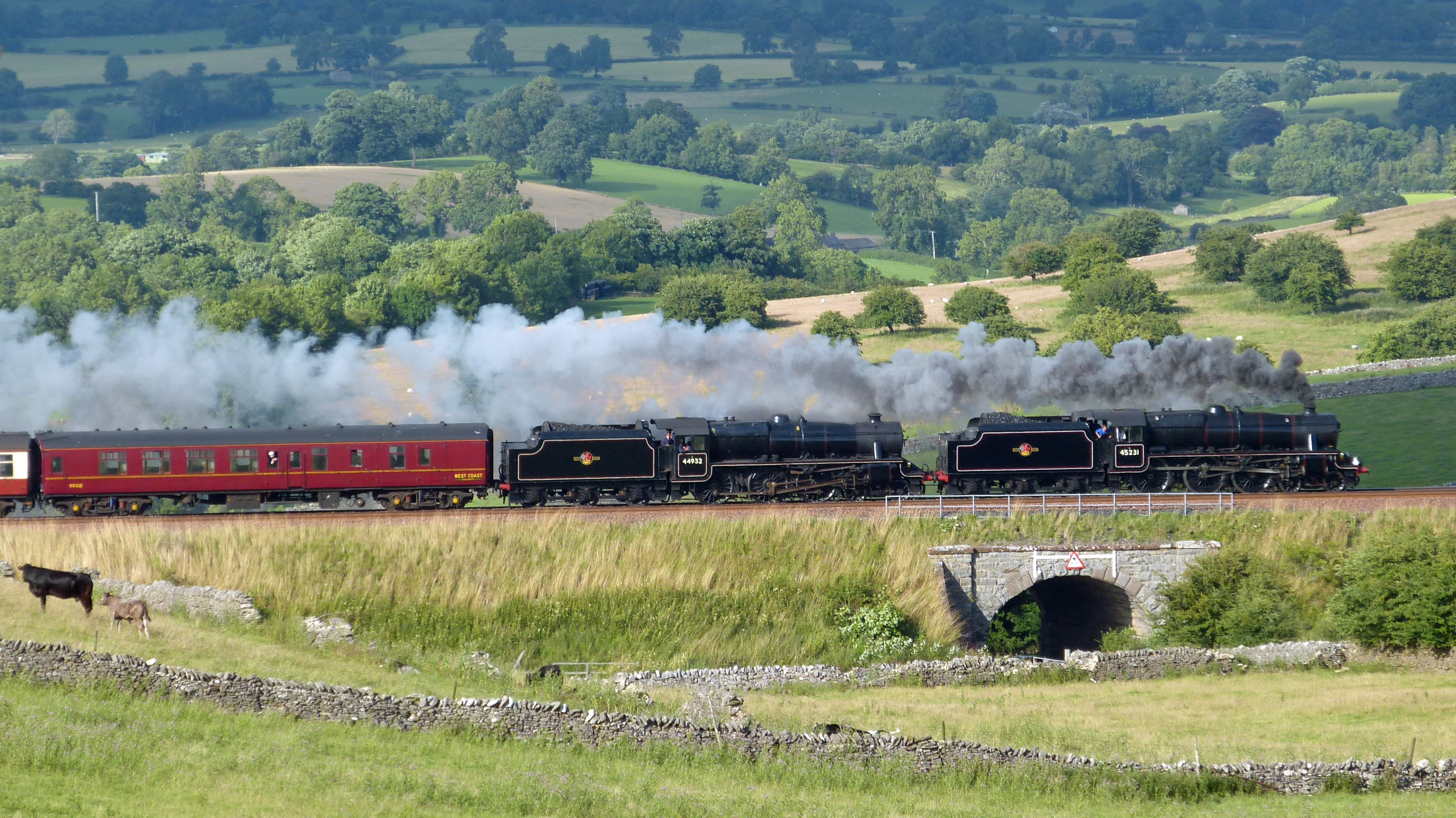
2013 rerun, 45231 piloting 44932.

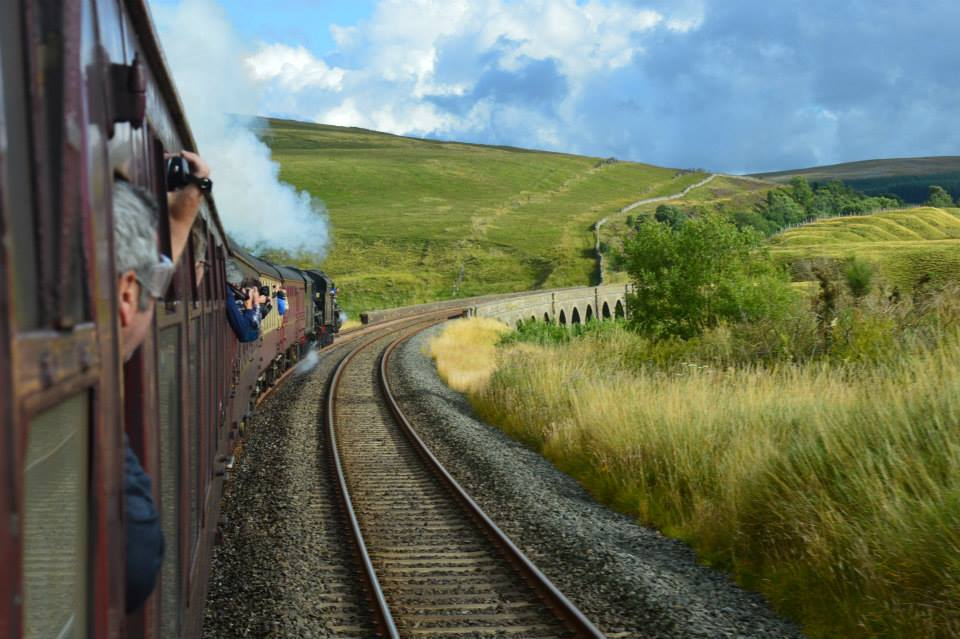
On-board the 45th anniversary rerun in August 2013, 45231 piloting 44932.

To commemorate the 40th anniversary, a re-run of the tour ran on Sunday 10 August 2008 (as 11 August was a Monday in 2008).

Five years later on the 45th anniversary of the run, another re-run of the tour ran on Sunday 11 August 2013. However, due to the original route from Liverpool to Manchester via Newton-le-Willows being shut for engineering works the tour had to be diverted along the route via Warrington to Manchester Piccadilly which hadn't seen steam traction ever since 1968. For the return trip, it also featured the originally intended black five for the Liverpool to Manchester section of the tour which was 45305 (45305 was booked to work the tour in 1968, but was replaced by 45110).

In October 2023, It was announced that plans are being looked at for a re-run to take place in 2028 for the 60th anniversary with the intention of having three of the four original engines from 1968 used.

== Summary of run routes and locomotives ==
=== 1968 run ===
- LMS Stanier Class 5 45110, Liverpool Lime Street to Manchester Victoria
- Britannia Class 70013 Oliver Cromwell, Manchester Victoria to Carlisle
- LMS Stanier Class 5 44871 and LMS Stanier Class 5 44781, Carlisle to Manchester Victoria
- LMS Stanier Class 5 45110, Manchester Victoria to Liverpool Lime Street

=== 1993 re-run ===
- Diesel, Nuneaton to Leeds
- LMS Coronation 4-6-2 46229 Duchess of Hamilton, Leeds to Carlisle
- LMS Stanier Class 5 44871 and LMS Jubilee Class 45596 Bahamas, Carlisle to Leeds
- Diesel, Leeds to Nuneaton

=== 2008 re-run ===
- LMS Stanier Class 8F 48151 (45110 unavailable), Liverpool Lime Street to Manchester Victoria.
- Britannia class 70013 Oliver Cromwell, Manchester Victoria to Carlisle.
- LMS Stanier Class 5 45407 (as first choice 44871 was under overhaul) and LMS Class 5 45231, Carlisle to Blackburn
- LMS Stanier Class 5 45231, Blackburn to Liverpool Lime Street

=== 2013 re-run ===
- LMS Class 5 45305 (45110 unavailable), Liverpool Lime Street to Longsight
- Britannia Class 70013 Oliver Cromwell, Longsight to Carlisle
- LMS Class 5 45231 (44871 unavailable) and LMS Class 5 44932, Carlisle to Longsight
- LMS Class 5 45305, Longsight to Liverpool Lime Street

LMS Class 5 45110 was not involved in the 2008 re-run as its main line certificate had expired. However, 45110 ran over the Severn Valley Railway on 11 August 2008 with a special 1T57 service. The locomotive remained in service until the end of August 2008, when an extension to its ten-year boiler ticket expired. The engine remained on static display when the 2013 re-run took place, first at Barrow Hill Roundhouse and then at The Engine House at Highley. As of May 2026, following a change of ownership and an overhaul the engine is now operational but not main line certified.

In October 2023, It was announced that plans are being looked at for a re-run of 1T57 to take place in 2028 for the 60th anniversary. 45110 is intended to be involved as the goal is to have three of the four original engines from 1968 used. However in June 2026, During an interview with the locomotives owner David Smith it was stated that plans for 45110 to go on the main line for 2028 would not be taking place due to other members of the class under his ownership 44767 and 44932 are due to be certified or are presently main line certified so a third 'Black Five' is unlikely.

LMS Class 5 45305 was allocated to the original train back in 1968 for the Liverpool to Manchester legs of the trip but failed the night before with a collapsed firebox brick arch and was replaced by 45110. It was however able to take part in the 2013 re-run. For the 2013 re-run the original route through Newton le Willows was unavailable due to electrification work so the tour went down the route via Hunts Cross and Warrington Central which hadn't seen steam traction since the end of steam in 1968. As a result of the electrification work it wasn't possible to reach Manchester Victoria so the engine changes took place at Longsight.

== See also ==
- "Last of the Steam-Powered Trains", a 1968 song by the Kinks
