= Kundur, Afghanistan =

Kundur Mogholi: کندر Persian: کوندر
- Village
- Location within Afghanistan
- Coordinates: 34°7′41″N 62°14′19″E
- Country: Afghanistan
- Province: Herat
- District: Guz̄arah
- Time zone: UTC+4:30 (AFT)
  - Summer (DST): AFT

Kundur is a village in Herat Province, Afghanistan. It is one of the two Mogholi speaking villages left alongside Karez-i-Mulla.
