= Mogol =

Mogol or Moghol may refer to:

- Moghol people, ethnic group in Afghanistan
  - Moghol language, Mongolic language of Afghanistan
- Mogol, Jalal-Abad, a town in Kyrgyzstan
- Mogol, Tajikistan, a town in Tajikistan
- Mogol (lyricist), real name Giulio Rapetti
- An alternative spelling of Mughal
- Il gran mogol (The Grand Moghul), Indian flute concerto by Antonio Vivaldi
- Il gran Mogol, libretto by Lalli
- Le grand mogol, opera by Edmond Audran
- Le Grand Mogol, retail shop in Paris by Rose Bertin

== See also ==
- Mogul (disambiguation)
- Moghuls (disambiguation)
- Mughal (disambiguation)
