= Mugalu =

Mugalu may refer to:

- Mugalu, alternative name for Yujiulü Mugulü, 4th century Rouran leader
- Stephen Kaziimba Mugalu (born 1962), Ugandan Anglican bishop

== See also ==
- Mughal (disambiguation)
