= Moghuls =

Moghuls may refer to:

- Moghuls (TV series), an Indian television series about the Mughal Empire based on the novels of Alex Rutherford
- Moghol people, Mongol ethnic group in Afghanistan
- Mughal people

== See also ==
- The Great Moghuls (film), a documentary series
- Empire of the Moghul, historical fiction novel series by Alex Rutherford
- Mughal (disambiguation), an alternate spelling of Moghul
- Mogul (disambiguation)
- Mogol (disambiguation)
