= LMS Stanier Class 5 =

LMS Stanier Class 5 may refer to:

- LMS Stanier Class 5 4-6-0, British steam locomotives commonly known as Black Fives
- LMS Stanier Mogul 2-6-0, British mixed-traffic steam locomotives built 1933–1934
