= LMS Stanier Class 5 4-6-0 4932 =

LMS 4932
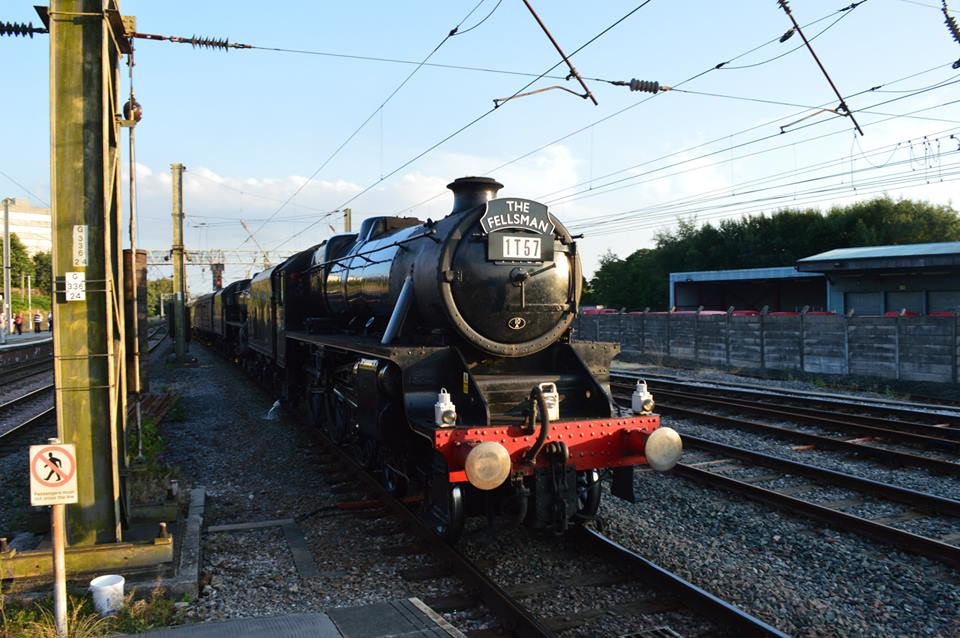
- 44932 arriving into Preston with the Fifteen Guinea Fellsman
Type and origin
- Power type: Steam
- Designer: William Stanier
- Builder: Horwich Works
- Serial number: 154 (second series)
- Build date: September 1945
Specifications
- Configuration
  - Whyte: 4-6-0
- Gauge: 4 ft 8 1/2 in (1,435 mm)
- Leading dia.: 3 ft 3 1/2 in (1.003 m)
- Driver dia.: 6 ft 0 in (1.829 m)
- Length: 63 ft 7 3/4 in (19.40 m)
- Fuel type: Coal
- Fuel capacity: 9 long tons (9.1 t; 10.1 short tons)
- Water cap.: 4,000 imp gal (18,000 L; 4,800 US gal)
- Firebox
  - Grate area: 28 1/2 sq ft (2.65 m^{2})
- Boiler: LMS type 3C
- Boiler pressure: 225 lbf/in^{2} (1.55 MPa)
- Cylinders: Two, outside
- Cylinder size: 18 1/2 in × 28 in (470 mm × 711 mm)
- Valve gear: Walschaerts
- Valve type: Piston valves
Performance figures
- Tractive effort: 25,455 lbf (113.23 kN)
Career
- Operators: London, Midland and Scottish Railway; → British Railways
- Power class: LMS: 5P5F; BR: 5MT
- Axle load class: BR: Route Availability 7
- Withdrawn: August 1968
- Current owner: David Smith
- Disposition: Operational, Mainline Certified

LMS Stanier Class 5MT 4932, is a preserved British steam locomotive. It is one of 18 surviving members of the Black 5 class which had 842 members constructed by five manufacturers. 44932 is the sole remaining member of the class which was built at the LMS's Horwich Works.

== Overview ==
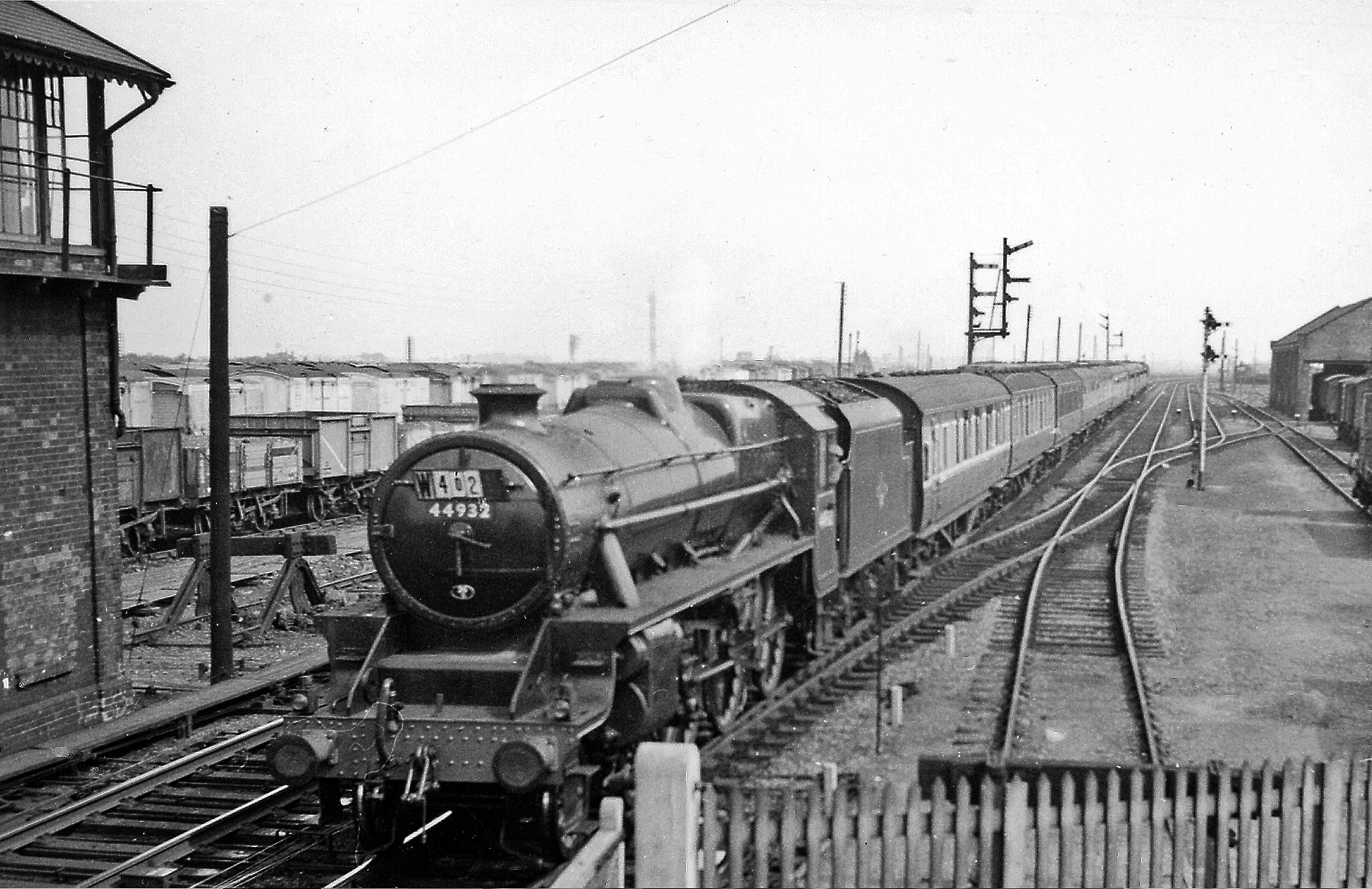
44932 at March with a Clacton-on-Sea to Birmingham train in 1958.

4932 was built in 1945 by the LMS at their Horwich Works – works no. 154. It was renumbered as 44932 by British Railways after the 1948 nationalisation of Britain's railways.

After completion at Horwich Works it was allocated to Blackpool Central's 24E Shed where it remained for nearly six years until January 1952 when it was transferred to Accrington near Blackburn. Further shed transfers were to follow throughout its career with British Railways including Agecroft - Greater Manchester, Leicester, Annesley and Derby. Its final shed allocation was Rose Grove's 10F shed where it was allocated to in both July 1965 and from March 1966 till its withdrawal in August 1968. Its service life was just under 23 years.

=== Allocations ===
The shed locations of 44932 on particular dates:

First shed	Blackpool Central, 24E
Jan 1952	Accrington, 24A
Feb 1957	Agecroft, 26B
Oct 1959	Leicester, 15E
Jan 1960	Annesley, 16D
Jan 1963	Cricklewood East, 14A
Feb 1963	Annesley, 16D
3 Jul 1965	Rose Grove, 10F
17 Jul 1965	Annesley, 16B
Dec 1965	Derby, 16C
Final Shed	Rose Grove, 10F

== Preservation ==
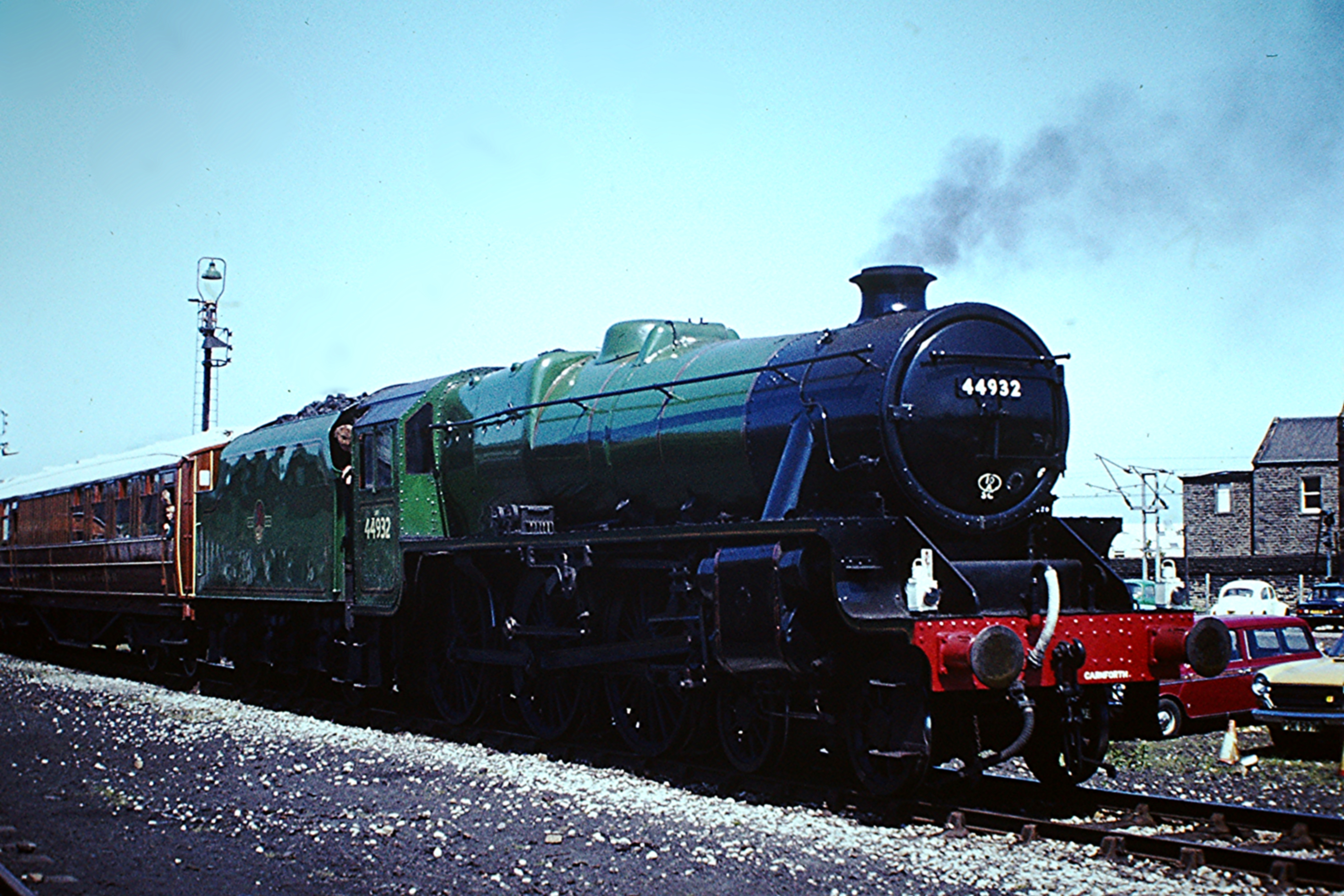
44932 in green at Carnforth MPD in May 1975.

After being bought from British Railways for preservation it was used on the mainline between overhauls. It in the early days of preservation wore lined brunswick green.

Acquired in 2008 by David Smith it was based at West Coast Railway's Carnforth MPD base. The engine as of 2018 was undergoing another overhaul with plans to return to the mainline on completion.

In August 2022 the engine returned to service following an overhaul at Carnforth MPD outshopped in British Railways lined black with British Railways lettering on its tender. The engine carried this livery from January 1948 until early 1949 before being changed to the cycling lion crest, in preservation the engine also wore this livery while mainline certified in the late 1980s/early 1990s. The engine undertook its first test run on 10 August running from Carnforth to Hellifield and back, and the engine worked its first revenue earning trip down the Cumbrian Coast and Furness Line while hauling the return leg of a "Cumbrian Coast Express" railtour from Carlisle to Carnforth on 24 September 2022. The London Euston to Carlisle via Shap Summit & Carnforth to London Euston legs being worked by British Rail Class 86 No. 86259 Les Ross.

Following completion of the engines latest overhaul in 2022, the engine is planned to be trialled out with the fitment of ETCS (in-cab signalling) alongside LNER Peppercorn Class A1 4-6-2 No. 60163 Tornado, as part of Network Rail's "Pathfinder Project" which is being undertaken to assess the fitment of in-cab signalling to heritage locomotives.

=== Fame in Preservation ===
In 2013 during the 45th anniversary celebrations of the end of steam in August 1968, it took part in two special one off railtours, the first was on Wednesday 7 August working one of the Statesman Rail's Fellsman trains which was renamed for the occasion "The Fifteen Guinea Fellsman" which it ran in double headed form with 45231 The Sherwood Forester from Lancaster to Carlisle and back via The Settle and Carlisle line. For this trip 44932 acted as pilot to 45231 and it wore the 1T57 Headboard for the occasion alongside the regular Fellsman headboard.

Four days later on Sunday 11 August it took part in the 45th anniversary run marking the end of steam on Sunday 11 August 1968. 44932 & 45231 were to once again double head with each other but this time 44932 was to act as train engine to 45231 which was acting as pilot engine. The two engines were in charge of the Carlisle to Longsight, (Manchester) leg of the tour. The two locos worked the special south down the Settle and Carlisle line to Hellifield and then down the Ribble Valley Line to Blackburn before taking the branch to Darwen and Bolton before arriving at Longsight where the two engines were replaced by classmate 45305 which would return the train to Liverpool. Other locos to take part in the tour included 45305 which took the train from Liverpool to Longsight in the morning and then back in the evening and 70013 Oliver Cromwell which worked the train from Longsight to Carlisle.
