= BR Standard Class 7 70013 Oliver Cromwell =

British steam locomotive

70013 Oliver Cromwell
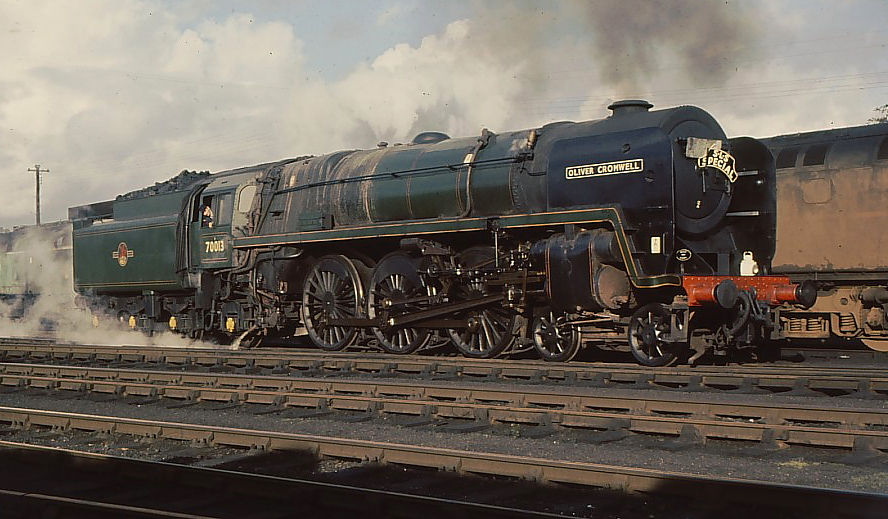
- 70013 Oliver Cromwell at Carlisle Kingmoor
Type and origin
- Power type: Steam
- Build date: 30 May 1951
Specifications
- Configuration
  - Whyte: 4-6-2
  - UIC: 2′C1′h2
- Gauge: 4 ft 8 1/2 in (1,435 mm) standard gauge
- Leading dia.: 3 ft 0 in (0.914 m)
- Driver dia.: 6 ft 2 in (1.880 m)
- Trailing dia.: 3 ft 3 1/2 in (1.003 m)
- Length: 68 ft 9 in (20.96 m)
- Width: 8 ft 8 3/4 in (2.66 m)
- Height: 13 ft 0 1/2 in (3.98 m)7004
- Axle load: 20.5 long tons (20.8 t; 23.0 short tons)
- Adhesive weight: 61.5 long tons (62.5 t; 68.9 short tons)
- Loco weight: 94 long tons (96 t; 105 short tons)
- Tender weight: BR1: 49.15 long tons (49.94 t; 55.05 short tons); BR1A: 52.5 long tons (53.3 t; 58.8 short tons); BR1D: 54.5 long tons (55.4 t; 61.0 short tons)
- Tender type: BR1 (40), BR1A (5), or BR1D (10)
- Fuel type: Coal
- Fuel capacity: BR1/BR1A: 7.0 long tons (7.1 t; 7.8 short tons); BR1D: 9.0 long tons (9.1 t; 10.1 short tons)
- Water cap.: BR1 4,250 imp gal (19,300 L; 5,100 US gal); BR1A: 5,000 imp gal (23,000 L; 6,000 US gal); BR1D: 4,750 imp gal (21,600 L; 5,700 US gal)
- Firebox
  - Grate area: 42 sq ft (3.9 m^{2})
- Boiler: BR1
- Boiler pressure: 250 psi (1.72 MPa)
- Heating surface
  - Firebox: 210 sq ft (20 m^{2})
  - Tubes and flues: 2,264 sq ft (210.3 m^{2})
- Superheater
  - Heating area: 718 sq ft (66.7 m^{2})
- Cylinders: Two, outside
- Cylinder size: 20 in × 28 in (508 mm × 711 mm)
Performance figures
- Tractive effort: 32,150 lbf (143.0 kN)
- Factor of adh.: 4.23
Career
- Operators: British Railways
- Class: Standard Class 7 (Britannia class)
- Numbers: 70013
- Official name: Oliver Cromwell
- Locale: Great Britain
- Withdrawn: 11 August 1968
- Current owner: National Railway Museum
- Disposition: Undergoing overhaul

70013 Oliver Cromwell is a British Railways Standard Class 7 (also known as the Britannia class) preserved steam locomotive. The locomotive is notable as one of the four steam locomotives which worked the last steam railtour on British Railways (BR) in 1968.

== Career ==
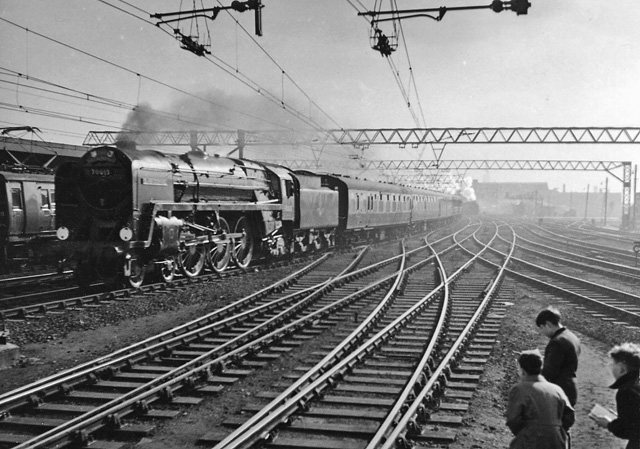
The Broadsman hauled by 70013 passes through Stratford in April 1958

One of 55 of the Standard Class 7, Oliver Cromwell was built at Crewe Works, being completed on 30 May 1951. 70013 was initially allocated to Norwich depot (BR shed code 32A) on the Eastern Region of British Railways and employed on London Liverpool Street to Norwich expresses. Some of the Norwich diagrams (the day's operating schedule for a locomotive) required two return trips a day to London totalling 460 miles. The introduction of the Britannia Pacifics revolutionised express services in East Anglia.

From 1958, diesel-electric locomotives began to replace steam locomotives. 70013 remained at Norwich until w/e 16 September 1961 when transferred to March depot (shed code 31B), having covered 698,000 miles in just over ten years, an excellent figure. Norwich depot, under the shedmaster Bill Harvey, was renowned for the fine mechanical condition of its locomotives. In December 1963, 70013 was transferred to the London Midland Region at Carlisle Kingmoor depot (shed code 12A) for freight, parcels and occasional passenger work – most regular express services were by now diesel-hauled. The north-west of England became the steam locomotive's last area of operation on BR. On 3 October 1966, 70013 entered Crewe Works and became the last BR-owned steam locomotive to undergo routine heavy overhaul, being out-shopped after a special ceremony in February 1967. 70013 was selected to operate the last steam passenger train prior to the abolition of steam traction on British Railways lines, and in the summer of 1968 Oliver Cromwell hauled several specials, culminating in the Fifteen Guinea Special which ran between Liverpool and Carlisle on 11 August that year and which 70013 hauled on the Manchester to Carlisle leg of the trip.

== Preservation ==
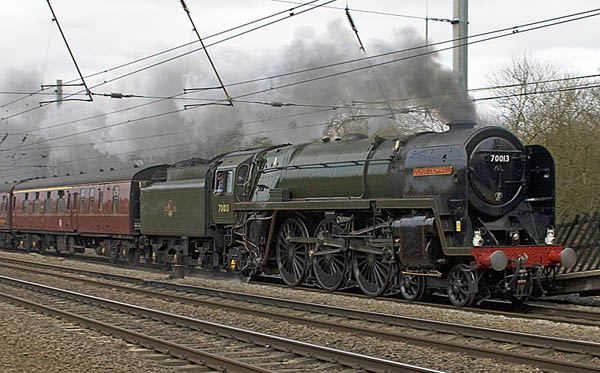
70013 Oliver Cromwell passing through Welham Green pulling the Great Northern from Cleethorpes to King's Cross on 28 February 2009

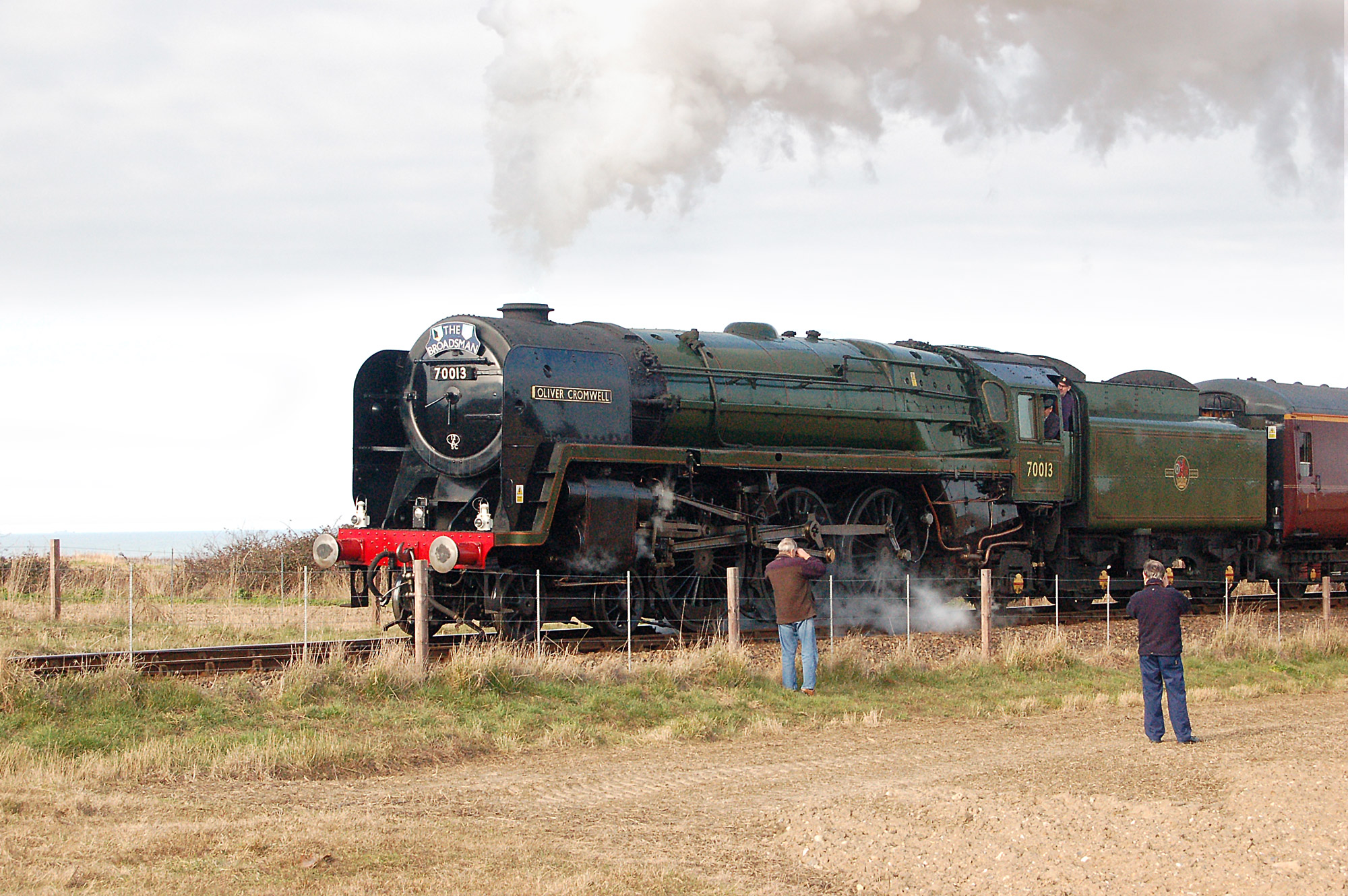
70013 Oliver Cromwell approaching Weybourne on the North Norfolk Railway on 11 March 2010

Oliver Cromwell became part of the National Railway Museum's National Collection immediately after the end of the Fifteen Guinea Special (70000 Britannia, later preserved privately, had previously been earmarked for this move). Despite a steam ban after 11 August 1968, 70013 moved under its own steam on 12 August to its old shed at Norwich and then, on 13 August, to Diss whence it was transported by road to Bressingham Steam & Gardens. At Bressingham, 70013 was in service to provide footplate rides until the 1980s, before retiring into the museum exhibition.

In 2004, it was announced that Oliver Cromwell would be restored to main-line standard in preparation for the 40th anniversary of the end of steam, with significant financial assistance from the readers of Steam Railway magazine. The locomotive was overhauled at the Great Central Railway (GCR) to mainline standards which included the fitting of the train protection warning system, overhaul of 70013's automatic warning system and the fitting of a train event recorder. On the weekend of 3 May – 4 May 2008, the locomotive hauled its first revenue-earning passenger services since being restored on the GCR's eight-mile route. The locomotive made an appearance at the National Railway Museum's 1968 and All That event celebrating 40 years since the end of steam.

Its first mainline passenger charter since 1968 was on 10 August 2008 when the locomotive took part in a re-run of the Fifteen Guinea Special. It then went on to operate on the Scarborough Spa Express later in the month.

On 9 September 2008, Oliver Cromwell completed a re-run of The Norfolkman running from Liverpool Street station to Norwich railway station and return, visiting the site of its former home of Norwich shed (32A). 70013 carried a 32A shed plate on the smokebox to complete the image.

On 8 November 2008, the locomotive was temporarily re-numbered as 70048 and renamed "The Territorial Army 1908 - 2008" to commemorate the 100th anniversary of the Territorial Army. The naming was performed by The Duke of Gloucester at Quorn and Woodhouse station on the preserved Great Central Railway. 70048 was a sister member of the BR Standard Class 7 Britannia class and was named "The Territorial Army 1908 - 1958". During the 2008 renaming, 70013 carried this name on the right-hand-side smoke deflector as a reminder of the original name and as a link with the past association with the Territorial Army.

On 14 March 2009 Oliver Cromwell hauled a special on what was said to be the very last train (of any sort) to use the branch line down to Folkestone Harbour, where main line trains used to meet with cross channel ferries.

On 23 May 2009, the locomotive hauled a railtour from Norwich to Poole in Dorset, and then travelled to the Swanage Railway under its own power, via Wareham and the re-instated link between the main-line and the Swanage Railway at Motala.

On 11 March 2010, Oliver Cromwell hauled the opening railtour over the newly re-instated level crossing at Sheringham on the North Norfolk Railway, arriving from King's Cross, via Cambridge and Norwich.

On 3 May 2010, Oliver Cromwell was used for a private charter by Girlguiding UK, as part of the celebration of 100 years of Guiding. Brownies Take Over the Tracks ran between London Victoria and Windsor & Eton Riverside.

On Saturday 15 May 2010, two years after its previous overhaul, Oliver Cromwell suffered from cracks in the firebox and was moved to the GCR for an inspection which led to the locomotive being withdrawn from service.

During 2010, 70013 Oliver Cromwell underwent firebox repairs at Crewe Heritage Centre. The cab was removed before the rest of the locomotive was sent for repairs to the boiler. Following these repairs, on 17 December 2010 the locomotive had a successful steam test at Crewe. On 8 March 2011, the locomotive was taken to Southall, and on 12 March 2011 hauled "The Lincoln Imp" from London Victoria to Lincoln, returning to Kings Cross.

On 27 May 2012, the locomotive was involved in a blowback incident at Wood Green tunnel near New Southgate station in North London on a Railway Touring Company railtour called 'The Peak Forester'. Two of the three crew on board the locomotive had to attend hospital as a result. A Rail Accident Investigation Branch investigation was conducted after the accident.

On 11 August 2013, 70013 took part in the 45th anniversary train of The Fifteen Guinea Special along with three LMS Black 5s, 44932, 45305 and 45231. 70013 took the train from Longsight to Carlisle traveling via Farington Junction, Blackburn and Hellifield while traveling along the Settle and Carlisle line.

On 3 March 2018, 70013 hauled its final main line charter from Ealing Broadway to York via the Midland Main Line prior to the expiry of its boiler certificate. It then moved to the GCR. 70013 later had a boiler inspection which enabled it to run on the GCR until 31 December 2018. It ran GCR services for the last time on that date before being withdrawn for overhaul. In 2019 it moved to the GCR to be overhauled.
