= LMS Stanier Class 5 4-6-0 5231 =

LMS 5231
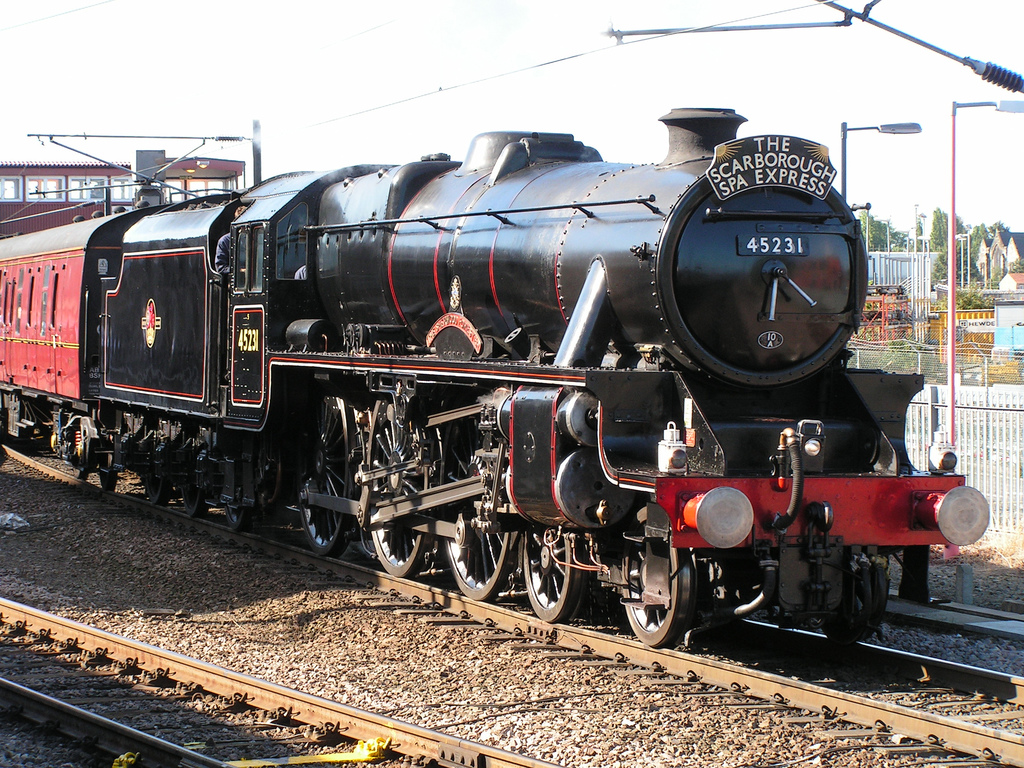
- 45231 stood in York with The Scarborough Spa Express
Type and origin
- Power type: Steam
- Designer: William Stanier
- Builder: Armstrong Whitworth
- Build date: August 1936
Specifications
- Configuration
  - Whyte: 4-6-0
- Gauge: 4 ft 8 1/2 in (1,435 mm)
- Leading dia.: 3 ft 3 1/2 in (1.003 m)
- Driver dia.: 6 ft 0 in (1.829 m)
- Length: 63 ft 7 3/4 in (19.40 m)
- Fuel type: Coal
- Fuel capacity: 9 long tons (9.1 t; 10.1 short tons)
- Water cap.: 4,000 imp gal (18,000 L; 4,800 US gal)
- Firebox
  - Grate area: 28 1/2 sq ft (2.65 m^{2})
- Boiler: LMS type 3C
- Boiler pressure: 225 lbf/in^{2} (1.55 MPa)
- Cylinders: Two, outside
- Cylinder size: 18 1/2 in × 28 in (470 mm × 711 mm)
- Valve gear: Walschaerts
- Valve type: Piston valves
Performance figures
- Tractive effort: 25,455 lbf (113.23 kN)
Career
- Operators: London, Midland and Scottish Railway; → British Railways
- Power class: LMS: 5P5F; BR: 5MT
- Axle load class: BR: Route Availability 7
- Withdrawn: August 1968
- Current owner: Jeremy Hosking
- Disposition: Operational, Mainline Certified

Stanier Class 5 4-6-0 5231 (British Railways no. 45231) is a preserved British steam locomotive. In preservation, it has carried the names 3rd (Volunteer) Battalion The Worcestershire and Sherwood Foresters Regiment and The Sherwood Forester, though it never carried either of these in service.

== Service ==
5231 was built by Armstrong-Whitworth in 1936 for the London, Midland and Scottish Railway. It spent most of its early career at Patricroft shed, working mainly to North Wales and Leeds. After nationalisation in 1948, it was renumbered 45231 by British Railways.

45231 was transferred to Northampton in October 1954, but was only officially there for a month — such allocation changes were often only carried out on paper — and then transferred to Aston, where it remained for nine years. 45231 was officially transferred to Rugby in February 1963, but was moved a short time later (July) to Chester. It stayed at Chester until closure of Chester shed in April 1967 when 45231 was then transferred to Speke Junction and finally Carnforth, where 45231 lasted until the last day of steam on BR in August 1968.

It was sold by BR directly into preservation and was restored at Carnforth to LMS livery.

This locomotive was one of a total of 842 with four of its class having the following names: 45154 Lanarkshire Yeomanry, 45156 Ayrshire Yeomanry, 45157 The Glasgow Highlander, and 45158 The Glasgow Yeomanry.

== Preservation ==
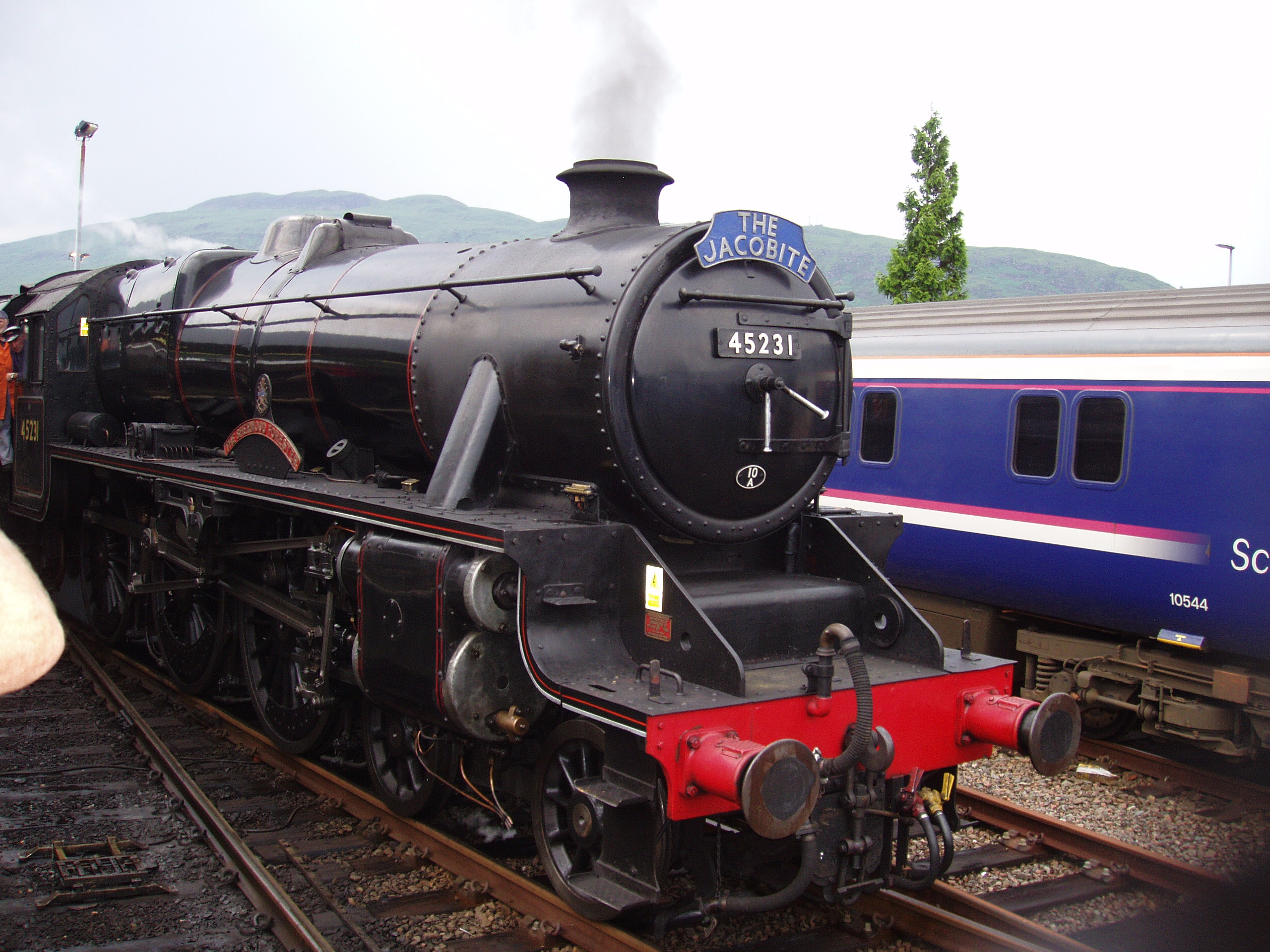
45231 at Fort William station running around after hauling The Jacobite from Mallaig.

After being initially preserved at Carnforth, 5231 became associated with the preserved Great Central Railway (GCR) in Leicestershire. In 1973, it hauled the official opening train between Loughborough and Quorn. Never having carried a name in BR service, the locomotive was nonetheless named 3rd (Volunteer) Battalion The Worcestershire and Sherwood Foresters Regiment at Quorn on 9 May 1976. It was taken out of service the following year for an overhaul.

5231 was overhauled in Cornwall, and was complete in 1988, when it returned to the GCR. It was then moved to the Nene Valley Railway from 1989 until 1993, when it returned to the GCR for the filming of Shadowlands. 5231 was sold to the GCR in late 1996, who repainted it in BR lined black in 1997. It also acquired a new set of nameplates, this time more simply The Sherwood Forester. A very similar name was carried by LMS Royal Scot Class (4)6112 Sherwood Forester.

45231 emerged from an overhaul in 2005 and shortly after it was moved by road to the Mid Hants Railway. It eventually undertook a proving run on Sun 26 Jun from Alton to Fratton before entering mainline service later in the year. 45231 returned to traffic in 2013 after another major overhaul was carried out at Carnforth MPD. In March 2015, 45231 paid a visit to the Llangollen Railway to attend the Steel Steam & Stars IV gala which was running over 2 weekends from Fri 6 to Sun 8 Mar & Fri 13 to Sun 15 March. Due to the railway not being connected to the national network, it had to be moved by road from Carnforth and the entrance to the yard at Llangollen was very tight. During the first weekend of the gala, the locomotive was failed with cylinder problems and was not able to take part in the remainder of the gala, with the engine returning to Carnforth shortly after the gala finished.

The locomotive was, until May 2015, owned by Bert Hitchen and after his death, the locomotive was taken into the care of the Hitchen family who looked after the engine until November 2015, when Jeremy Hosking purchased the locomotive from the Hitchen family. 45231 is currently based at Crewe Diesel TMD alongside a number of other mainline certified locomotives to help with charter trains. Its current mainline certificate expires in 2020 with the boiler certificate running out in 2023.

== Fame in Preservation ==
45231 was used in the 40th anniversary special of the Fifteen Guinea Special on 10 August 2008. It worked alongside fellow class engine 45407 when they double headed the train from Carlisle back as far as Blackburn. 45231 then worked the train alone back to Liverpool Lime Street via Wigan.

2013 marked the 45th anniversary of the end of regular steam on British Railways in August 1968, and because 11 August was on a Sunday, it was fitting that the special was to run on the exact day 45 years after the 1968 run. 45231 was one of the chosen engines to work two special one-off railtours in August. The first trip was on Wednesday 7 August, working one of Statesman Rail's Fellsman trains which was renamed for the occasion "The Fifteen Guinea Fellsman", which also had the 1T57 headboard fitted alongside the regular Fellsman headboard. It ran in double-headed form with sister engine 44932 from Lancaster to Carlisle and back via the Settle-Carlisle line both ways.

Then on the Sunday of the same week, 11 August (the final day of regular steam on BR in 1968), 45231 was given the honour of double heading once again with sister 44932, but this time acting as pilot engine, and it carried the 1T57 Headboard for the occasion. Also for the trip, its "Sherwood Forester" nameplates were removed as the majority of Black 5s in BR days, apart from five, did not have nameplates fitted. 45231 & 44932 worked the Carlisle to Longsight via Hellifield and Darwen leg of the Railway Touring Company's "Fifteen Guinea Special" 45th anniversary train. Other engines that played roles in this special were a third sibling engine no 45305 (allocated to the original train in 1968 but replaced by 45110) which worked from Liverpool to Longsight and return via Warrington Central and 70013 Oliver Cromwell which worked the Longsight to Carlisle leg via Hellifield.

== TPWS Isolation Incident ==
On 2 October 2015, The Sherwood Forester was working a West Coast Railways (WCR) special through Doncaster when it was noticed that its Train Protection & Warning System (TPWS) had been isolated by the footplate crew. Previously, isolation of TPWS on a WCR operated locomotive had been a factor in the 2015 Wootton Bassett SPAD incident and the resultant suspension of WCRC's access to the network. As a result, in November 2015 a further prohibition notice was issued to WCRC by the Office of Rail and Road, suspending further steam services operated by them.
