= LMS Stanier Class 5 4-6-0 5305 =

LMS 5305
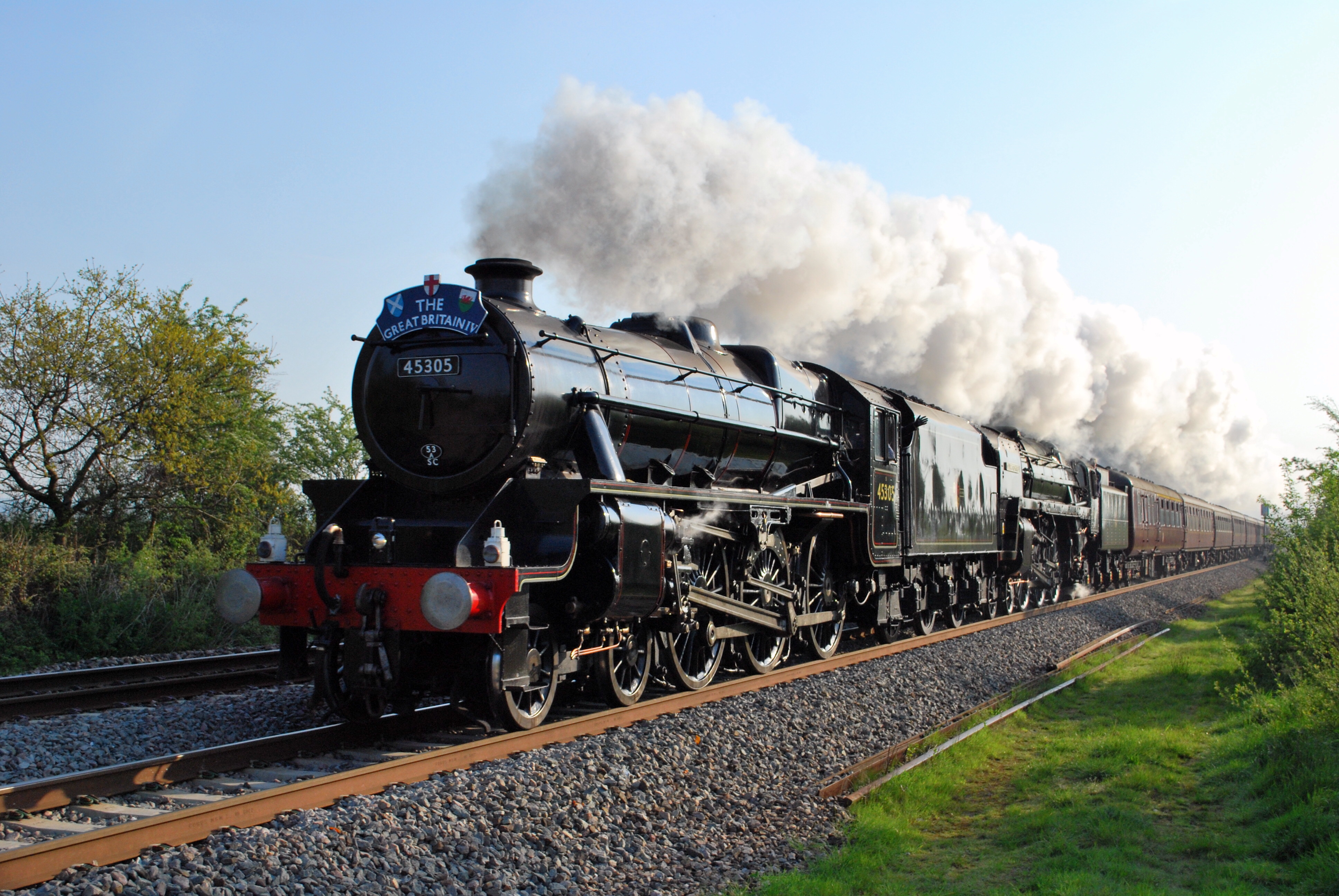
- 45305 double heading with 70013 Oliver Cromwell hauling The Great Britain IV
Type and origin
- Power type: Steam
- Designer: William Stanier
- Builder: Armstrong Whitworth
- Build date: January 1937
Specifications
- Configuration
  - Whyte: 4-6-0
- Gauge: 4 ft 8 1/2 in (1,435 mm)
- Leading dia.: 3 ft 3 1/2 in (1.003 m)
- Driver dia.: 6 ft 0 in (1.829 m)
- Length: 63 ft 7 3/4 in (19.40 m)
- Fuel type: Coal
- Fuel capacity: 9 long tons (9.1 t; 10.1 short tons)
- Water cap.: 4,000 imp gal (18,000 L; 4,800 US gal)
- Firebox
  - Grate area: 28 1/2 sq ft (2.65 m^{2})
- Boiler: LMS type 3C
- Boiler pressure: 225 lbf/in^{2} (1.55 MPa)
- Cylinders: Two, outside
- Cylinder size: 18 1/2 in × 28 in (470 mm × 711 mm)
- Valve gear: Walschaerts
- Valve type: Piston valves
Performance figures
- Tractive effort: 25,455 lbf (113.23 kN)
Career
- Operators: London, Midland and Scottish Railway; → British Railways
- Power class: LMS: 5P5F; BR: 5MT
- Axle load class: BR: Route Availability 7
- Withdrawn: August 1968
- Current owner: A E Draper and Sons
- Disposition: Undergoing Overhaul

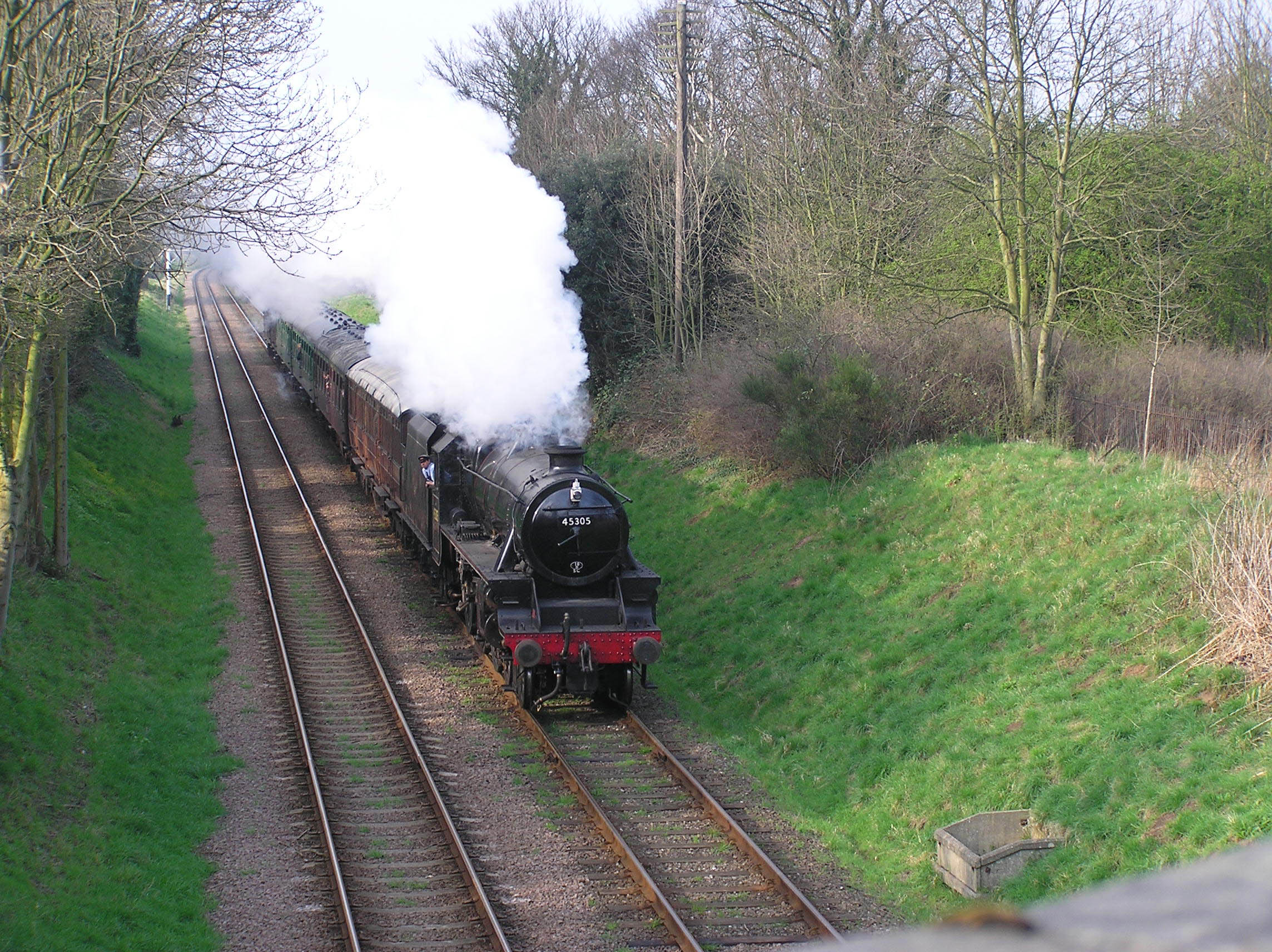
45305 running along the Great Central Railway.

London, Midland and Scottish Railway (LMS) Stanier Class 5 4-6-0 No. 5305 (British Railways no. 45305) is a preserved British steam locomotive. In preservation, it has carried the name Alderman A.E. Draper, though it never carried this in service. It was named after Albert Draper, the man who rescued the locomotive in his own scrapyard.

== Service ==
5305 was built by Armstrong-Whitworth of Newcastle-on-Tyne in January 1936, works No 1360. It spent most of its career based in North-West England. After nationalisation in 1948, British Railways renumbered it as 45305.

45305 survived to the last month of steam on British Railways. It was even a candidate for the well known Fifteen Guinea Special which ran on 11 August 1968, but on the night before the trip it was failed with a collapsed firebox brick arch and had to be replaced by engine 45110. 45305 was withdrawn from service at Lostock Hall shed as a result of the firebox brick arch failure.

== Preservation ==
45305 was sold to scrap merchants Albert Drapers and Sons Ltd. of Hull. No. 5305 became the last locomotive on the scrap line of Drapers of Hull, who broke up 742 former BR locomotives. No. 5305 was to have been the 743rd and last, but the scrapyard's owner, Albert Draper, decided to save one of the yard's locomotives for posterity, and have it restored to full running order. He eventually chose 45305, simply because it was the cleanest engine in the yard.

Albert Draper was, at the time, the president of Hull Kingston Rovers Rugby League Football Club, and it was his fond wish that No.5305 would one day head a special train from Hull to Wembley, where he hoped the club would be playing in the Rugby League Challenge Cup Final.

No. 5305 was put in the care of the Humberside Locomotive Preservation Group and based at Hull Dairycoates MPD, where it was eventually brought up to full main line standard.

5305, restored to original LMS livery was steamed again in 1976. In 1984, 5305 was named Alderman A E Draper by the Mayor of Hedon, Bill Tong. A.E. Draper was twice Mayor of Hedon and the Hedon coat of arms is on the nameplates. However, for reasons of authenticity, the engine does not always carry these nameplates.

Between 1986 and 1992 5305 spent several summer seasons working over the West Highland Line between Fort William and Mallaig, continuing the class's particular association with Scotland.

The locomotive left Hull Dairycoates in April, 1992 on the closure of that shed, first moving to the Keighley and Worth Valley Railway, running there until its ten-year boiler certificate expired in December 1994. In 1996, the engine left the KWVR, first moving to RAF Binbrook in Lincolnshire, and then to the preserved Great Central Railway at Loughborough in Leicestershire, arriving there on 20 November 1996. Following a full overhaul at Loughborough works, the engine returned to service in August 2003, this time in BR guise as 45305.

The locomotive remained in the ownership of the Draper family until 2025, when it was donated to the 5305 Locomotive Trust, the successor to the Humberside Locomotive Preservation Group.

== Fame in preservation ==
2013 marked the 45th anniversary since the end of steam on British Railways in 1968, and because Aug 11 was on a Sunday it was decided for a re-run to take place to mark 45 years since the end of steam. 45305 was booked to work the original train in 1968 but was failed the night before the trip due to a collapsed firebox brickarch, so allowing her to work the anniversary run 2013 allowed the ghost of 1968 to finally be put to rest.

There was also a change of routing as the original route through Newton-le-Willows from Liverpool to Manchester was closed for engineering works so the tour was diverted down the line to Piccadilly via Warrington Central which had not seen steam traction since 1968. 45305 worked from Liverpool to Longsight and then worked back from Longsight to Liverpool in the evening. Other locos that worked the tour included BR Standard Class 7 70013 Oliver Cromwell which worked from Longsight to Carlisle via Bolton, Farington & Settle while LMS Black 5 4-6-0's Nos. 45231 and 44932 double headed the train from Carlisle to Longsight via Settle, Darwen & Bolton.

The loco also featured in Season 2 Episode 3 of the Netflix Series 'The Crown', hauling a train that carried Sir Anthony Eden to Sandringham to offer his resignation to the Queen following the Suez crisis.
