= The Norfolkman =

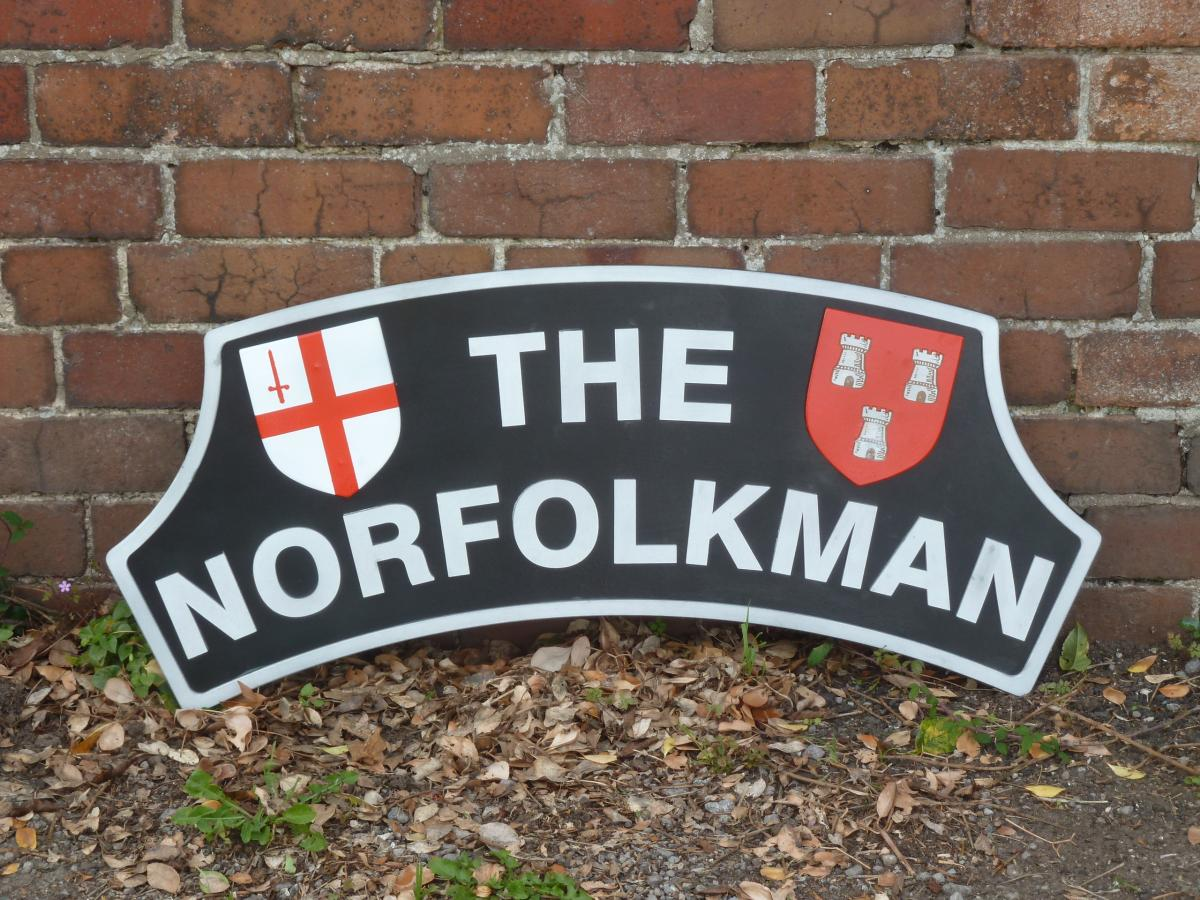

The Norfolkman was an express passenger train between London Liverpool Street station and Norwich. In the Summer, the service was extended to the Norfolk coast, first at Sheringham and later at Cromer.

The train, usually hauled by a LNER Thompson Class B1 or a BR Standard Class 7 ran along the Great Eastern main line to Norwich; the heyday of the train was in the 1950s. Famous engines that would have hauled this train include 70013 Oliver Cromwell and 70000 Britannia as they were allocated to Norwich depot (32A). Once at Norwich the train left to go on today's Bittern line to Sheringham, terminating at today's North Norfolk Railway station.

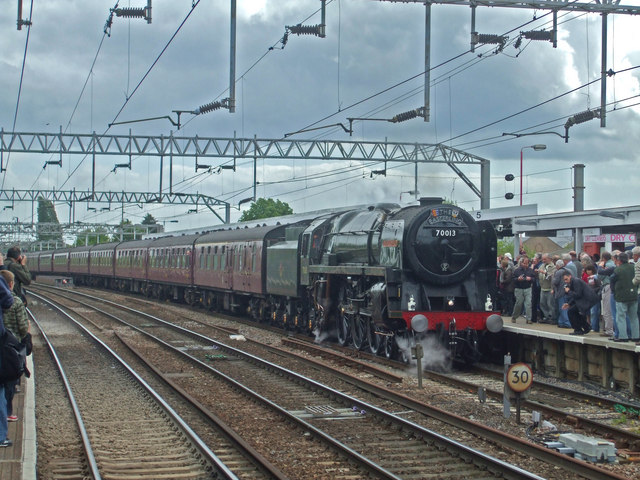
In 2009, with 70013

On 9 and 20 September 2008 the train re-ran using steam celebrity 70013, carrying an original "the Norfolkman" headboard.
