= Mughal =

Mughal or Moghul may refer to:

== Related to the Mughal Empire ==
- Mughal Empire of South Asia between the 16th and 19th centuries
  - Mughal dynasty, dynastic family whose members ruled this empire
  - Mughal emperors, ruling members of the dynastic family
- Mughal architecture
- Mughlai cuisine
  - Mughlai paratha, a street food
- Mughal painting
- Grand Mughal, exonymous title given to the Mughal emperors
- Great Mogul Diamond
- Empire of the Moghul, historical fiction novel series by Alex Rutherford
  - Moghuls (TV series) or The Empire, Indian TV series based on the novels

== Other uses ==
- Moghulistan in Central Asia
  - Moghol people
- Tarkhan (Punjab), a caste in the Punjab region of India and Pakistan who use the title "Mughal"
- Moghul, Iran, a village
- Mughal Khel, a sub-tribe of Yousafzai Pashtuns settled in Ghoriwala, Bannu
- Mirza Mughal (1817–1857), a Mughal prince
- Arjumman Mughal, Indian actress
- Chaya Mughal, Indian cricketer
- Farooq Mughal, American politician from Georgia
- Fiyaz Mughal, founder of Tell MAMA
- Tehmasp Rustom Mogul, Indian sailor
- Mughal Road, Jammu and Kashmir, India
- Mughal Sarai, town in Uttar Pradesh, India, originally a Mughal caravanserai
- Mughal Sarai, Surat, historical caravanserai in Gujarat, India
- Mughal Serai, village in Punjab, India
- Mughal Serai, Doraha, caravanserai and fort in Punjab, India

== See also ==
- Mogul (disambiguation)
- Moghuls (disambiguation)
- Mogol (disambiguation)
- Mughal-e-Azam (disambiguation)
- Mughal–Safavid war (disambiguation)
- Mughal war of succession (disambiguation)
