= Karez-i-Mulla =

Karez-i-Mulla Mogholi: كریزِملا Persian: كریزِملا
- Village
- Location within Afghanistan
- Coordinates: 34°7′41″N 62°11′19″E
- Country: Afghanistan
- Province: Herat
- District: Guz̄arah
- Time zone: UTC+4:30 (AFT)
  - Summer (DST): AFT

Karez-i-Mulla (also known as Karez-e-Mulla) is a village located in Herat, Afghanistan. The village is mostly Mogholi speaking and is inhabited by Moghol people.
