= LMS Stanier Class 5 4-6-0 5110 =

Preserved historic steam locomotive

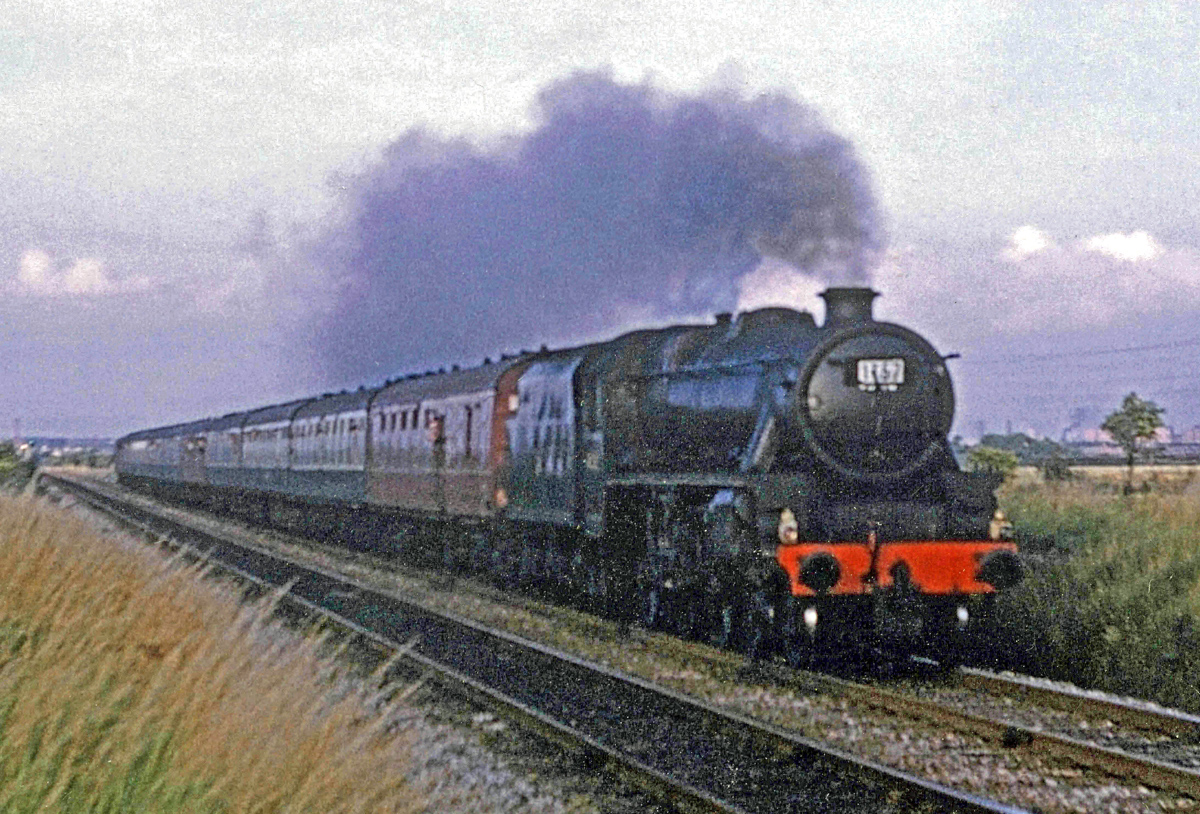
45110 hauling the Fifteen Guinea Special on its last leg from Manchester to Liverpool on 11 August 1968

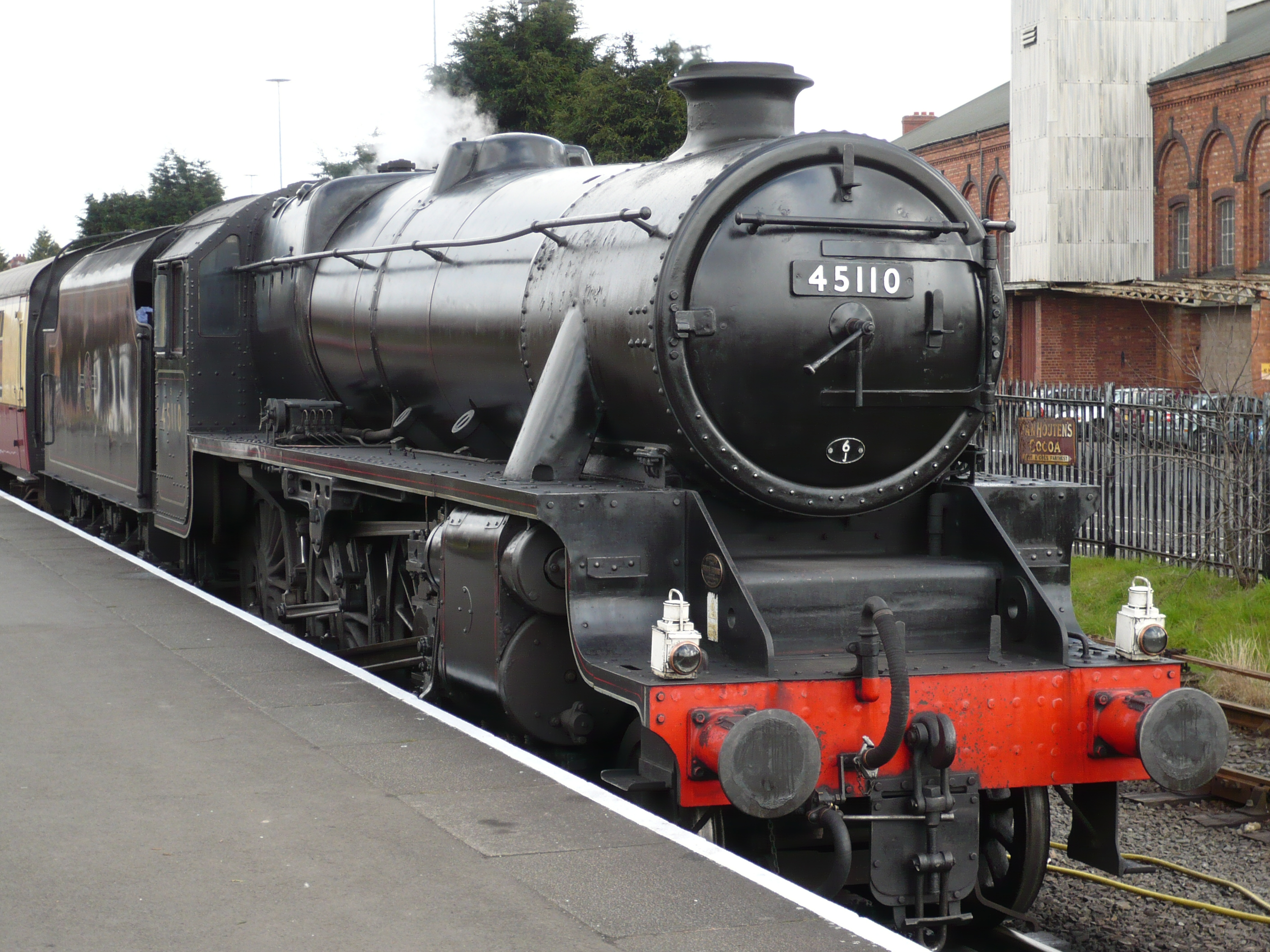
45110 at Kidderminster in 2008

London, Midland and Scottish Railway (LMS) Stanier Class 5 4-6-0 No. 5110 (British Railways No. 45110) is a preserved British steam locomotive. It has carried the name RAF Biggin Hill in preservation, though it never carried this in service. Number 5110 was built in 1935 by the Vulcan Foundry. It was built with a low-degree superheat domeless boiler and still carries a domeless boiler.

== Fifteen Guinea Special ==
The locomotive was one of three members of the class to haul the Fifteen Guinea Special, British Rail's last steam-hauled passenger train, on 11 August 1968. It took the first leg from Liverpool Lime Street to Manchester Victoria at the beginning of the tour before running from Manchester Victoria to Liverpool Lime Street with the returning train at the end of the day's tour. This locomotive was used in place of sister engine 45305, which had been selected for this duty, but had been failed with a collapsed firebox brick arch the night before the run, and had been withdrawn prematurely as a result.

== Use in preservation ==
After hauling the Fifteen Guinea Special, 45110 was purchased straight from service for preservation by David Porter of the "Flairavia Flying Club" at Biggin Hill Airport. It moved temporarily to the former Ashford shed where it was named RAF Biggin Hill, and then to the Severn Valley Railway (SVR) in 1970; it was subsequently bought by the SVR in 1974, and has since been based at the line's locomotive depots at Bridgnorth and Bewdley.

Between 1994 and 1998, when the engine itself was undergoing a major overhaul at Bridgnorth, 45110's tender was used behind LMS Stanier Mogul 42968 (then in LMS livery as 2968), whilst its own Fowler tender had a twisted frame problem ironed out.

Following a return to service on 11 August 1998, the engine was main line registered and hauled many main line steam specials on the national rail network including "Steam on the Met" trains. However, in 2000 while working a three-day railtour running from Saturday 27 to Monday 29 May "The Laird of Stranraer" the engine suffered a series of mechanical problems. While working Day 1 of the tour from Crewe to Glasgow Central while double heading with sister 45157 The Glasgow Highlander (45407 in disguise), the engine suffered a hotbox on its tender at Carnforth and needed to borrow the tender of 48151. The engine suffered leaking tubes on Day 2 so had to be repaired while 45157 worked the train alone from Glasgow Central to Stranraer. After repairs the engine double headed with 45157 on Day 3 for the journey back to Crewe from Glasgow, but was failed in Lockerbie with leaking tubes.

Following this failure the engine was confined to heritage rail operation only. It was hoped to have run 45110 on the 2008 recreation of the Fifteen Guinea Special, but this was not possible as the engine was due to come out of ticket on 11 August, the same day as the Fifteen Guinea Special re-run, and so a competition was offered by Steam Railway magazine to drive the engine on 11 August. Despite this, the engine was given an extension to its 10-year boiler ticket up to the end of August, at the end of which, the loco was withdrawn after 10 years of service.

In 2009–10, 45110 was placed on static display at Barrow Hill Engine Shed to take advantage of the available under cover storage. It was planned that the locomotive would remain at Barrow Hill for up to two years on loan from the Severn Valley Railway, which would see its return to the SVR in 2011–12, but in 2010 the engine's tender was recalled to the SVR to be used once again behind 42968, after the 2-6-0's own tender developed wheelflats. 45110's tender remained in use behind 42968 until early 2012, when 42968 regained its own tender for the last year of its own 10 year boiler ticket, which expired in January 2013.

45110 returned to Bridgnorth on 30 September 2013, entering The Engine House at Highley on 6 October 2013 in place of 4930 Hagley Hall, which had just been moved to Bridgnorth for the start of a major overhaul. 45110 briefly left the Engine House in order to appear as a static exhibit at Kidderminster in August 2018 in an event marking 50 years since the end of BR steam, returning to the Engine House in September 2018. In March 2019 the locomotive was moved into store at Kidderminster.

In August 2023 it was announced that because the railway was unable to consider the locomotive's restoration to working order due to the financial crisis following the COVID-19 pandemic and rising running costs, the locomotive was sold to an unnamed buyer and had left the SVR for Carnforth by road on 15 August. The engine was to be given a full mainline standard overhaul with the intention of being ready for the 60th Anniversary of the Fifteen Guinea Special in August 2028, which is being planned with the intention of having three of the original engines involved.

45110 on the Gloucestershire Warwickshire Railway in 2026

45110 returned to service in May 2026 making its debut appearance at the Gloucestershire Warwickshire Railway for their spring steam gala. Following its appearance at the GWR for their spring steam gala, it was announced that 45110 was to remain on extended loan to the Gloucestershire Warwickshire Railway for a six-month extended stay.

In an interview by Trackside with David Smith in May 2026 regarding if 45110 would operate on the main line again following its Toddington debut, David stated: "We've got a 'Black Five' with all the gear on anyway. We've got George Stephenson coming up which will be a better engine engine for the main line, so there's no point in doing three 'Black Fives'". When asked regarding plans for August 2028 he further stated "Not really. I think that's been and gone now. You can't keep on doing it can you? It went on it in '68, and doing it another time isn't the same as doing it for the last time is it?. For now, 'Fifty-One-Ten' will haul trains at 25mph in the Cotswolds for six months". In a final comment regarding heritage railway visits he stated: "I don't normally go up for renting things to private railways. It's just sometimes it helps if I know who they are and that they'll look after it properly".
