= LMS Stanier Mogul =

British steam locomotive class (1933–1967)

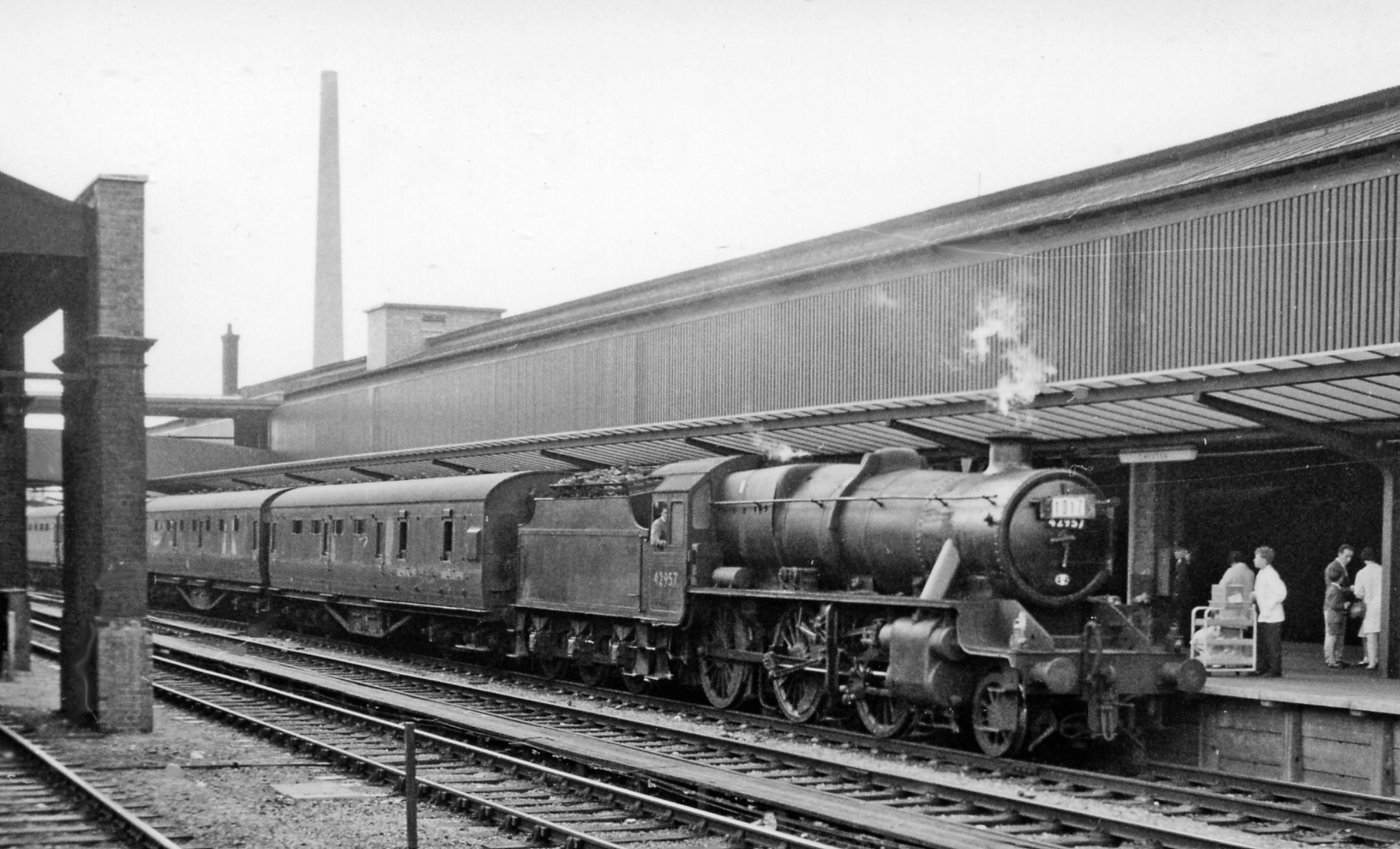
- 42957 at Chester in August 1962.
Type and origin
- Power type: Steam
- Designer: William Stanier
- Builder: LMS Crewe Works
- Build date: October 1933 – March 1934
- Total produced: 40
Specifications
- Configuration
  - Whyte: 2-6-0
  - UIC: 1′C h2
- Gauge: 4 ft 8 1/2 in (1,435 mm) standard gauge
- Leading dia.: 3 ft 3 1/2 in (1.003 m)
- Driver dia.: 5 ft 6 in (1.676 m)
- Length: 59 ft 10 3/4 in (18.26 m)
- Loco weight: 69.10 long tons (70.21 t; 77.39 short tons)
- Tender weight: 42.20 long tons (42.88 t; 47.26 short tons)
- Fuel type: Coal
- Fuel capacity: 5 long tons (5.1 t; 5.6 short tons)
- Water cap.: 3,500 imp gal (16,000 L; 4,200 US gal)
- Firebox
  - Grate area: 27 3/4 sq ft (2.58 m^{2})
- Boiler: LMS type 3D
- Boiler pressure: 225 lbf/in^{2} (1.55 MPa)
- Heating surface
  - Firebox: 155 sq ft (14.4 m^{2})
  - Tubes and flues: 1,256 or 1,479 sq ft (116.7 or 137.4 m^{2})
- Superheater
  - Heating area: 185 to 244 sq ft (17.2 to 22.7 m^{2})
- Cylinders: Two, outside
- Cylinder size: 18 in × 28 in (457 mm × 711 mm)
- Valve gear: Walschaerts
- Valve type: Piston valves
Performance figures
- Tractive effort: 26,290 lbf (116.94 kN)
Career
- Operators: London, Midland and Scottish Railway; → British Railways
- Power class: 5P4F, later 5P5F, later 6P5F, later 5MT
- Numbers: LMS: 13245–13284; → 2945–2984; BR: 42945–42984
- Withdrawn: 1963–1967
- Disposition: One preserved, remainder scrapped

The London, Midland and Scottish Railway (LMS) Stanier Class 5 2-6-0 or Stanier Mogul is a class of 2-6-0 mixed traffic steam locomotives. Forty were built between October 1933 and March 1934.

== Overview ==
Although all built at Crewe Works, they were designed at Horwich Works and were developed from the Horwich Mogul, the LMS Hughes Crab 2-6-0. They had the addition of several features brought over from the Great Western Railway by newly arrived Chief Mechanical Engineer William Stanier, most notably the taper boiler (Stanier would have been familiar with the GWR 4300 Class). In an effort to please Stanier, Horwich had designed a GWR-style top-feed cover and showed him locomotive 13245 with this fitted. However, Stanier disapproved and had it replaced with the normal LMS cover.

Due to a higher boiler pressure than the Crabs the cylinder diameter was 3 in (76 mm) smaller and could thus be mounted horizontally, the only Stanier design to do so. Like the Crabs they were connected to a Fowler tender that was narrower than the locomotive. When built, the first ten locomotives had no water pick-up gear fitted.

They were initially numbered 13245–13284 (following on from the Crabs), but as standard locomotives, in the LMS 1933 renumbering scheme they were renumbered 2945–2984 in 1934 (the Crabs becoming 2700–2944). BR added 40000 to their numbers so they became 42945–42984. They were always painted black, and this was lined out except during the austere periods of the 1940s and towards the end of steam.

From the end of 1934 Stanier turned to a larger 4-6-0 for his mixed traffic class, this being the LMS Black Five Class.

== Details ==
Pre-1934 LMS Number	Post-1934 LMS Number (Later BR number[BR number being LMS number + 40000])	Lot No.	Works	Built	Notes
13245–57	2945–57	104	Crewe	October 1933	Original boiler design
13260	2960	104	Crewe	1933	Revised boiler design
13263	2963	104	Crewe	1933	
13258–59	2958–59	104	Crewe	1934	
13261–62	2961–62	104	Crewe	1934	
13264–84	2964–84	104	Crewe	March 1934	13268 preserved

== Withdrawal ==
Withdrawals commenced in November 1963 with the last one being withdrawn in February 1967.

Table of withdrawals
Year	Quantity in service at start of year	Quantity withdrawn	Locomotive numbers
1963	40	4	42949/73/76/84.
1964	36	9	42952/56/62/65–66/69–71/79.
1965	27	11	42946–48/50/58–59/61/64/72/74/82.
1966	16	15	42945/51/53/55/57/60/63/67–68/75/77–78/80–81/83.
1967	1	1	42954.

== Preservation ==
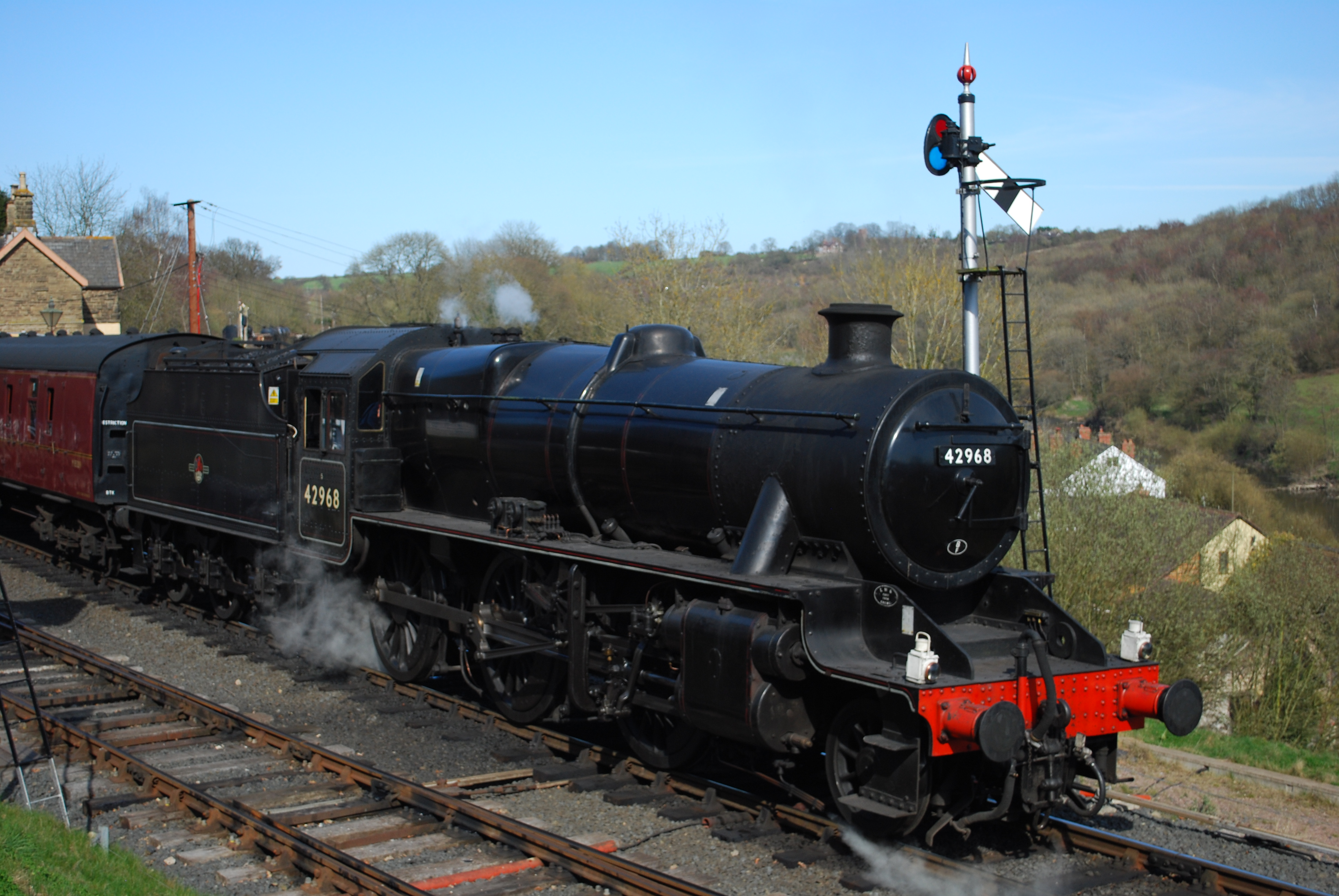
42968 on the Severn Valley Railway in March 2012

One, 13268/(4)2968, the penultimate member of the class to be withdrawn, has been preserved. This locomotive was acquired from Woodham Brothers scrapyard in Barry, South Wales by the Stanier Mogul Fund in December 1973. It was restored on the Severn Valley Railway, first entering service in April 1991 as LMS 2968. It was main line certified in 1996 and was the first locomotive, together with GWR 4300 Class 7325, to work a train over the Lickey Incline in preservation.

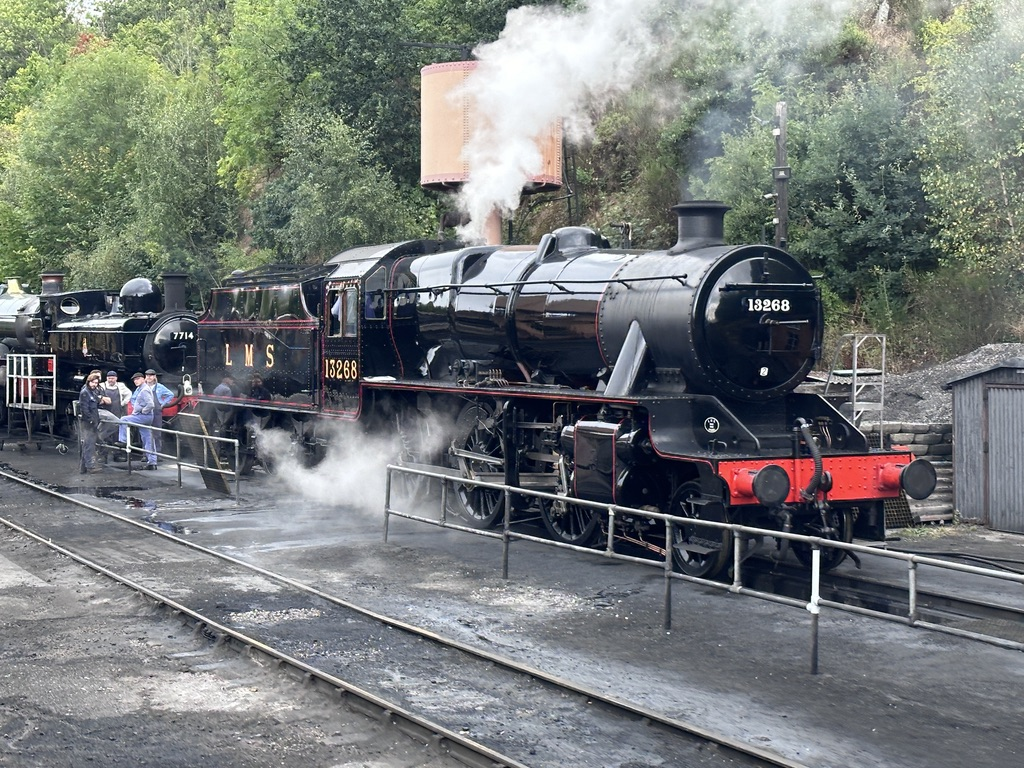
13268 in original as-built condition at Bewdley MPD in April 2024.

After withdrawal for overhaul in 1998, it re-entered service in 2003 in BR lined livery as 42968, which it carried for ten years. Following another overhaul, it re-entered service in late 2023, being repainted in LMS Lined Black as 13268 in April 2024. It is notable that this is the first time that the locomotive has carried its original number in 90 years since it was renumbered to 2968.

On two occasions, firstly between 1994 and 1998, and again between 2010 and 2012, it ran with the tender from Black 5 no. 45110, while its own Fowler-pattern one was undergoing repairs.

In April 2025, it was announced that 13268 was to appear at The Greatest Gathering alongside a pair of the Severn Valley Railway's London Midland and Scottish Railway coaches. Movement of 13268 alongside fellow Severn Valley Railway resident 4930 'Hagley Hall' as well as a pair of Great Western Railway coaches from the Severn Valley Railway to Derby Litchurch Lane Works was done by rail behind a diesel locomotive. The move along the national network was the first time the locomotive had appeared on the mainline since the 1990s and its first with its Fowler tender in preservation.

In August 2026, the Severn Valley Railway announced that it would return to the main line in November 2026 in partnership with Vintage Trains, with an inaugural run between Worcester and Stratford-upon-Avon.

== Models ==
Bachmann Branchline has produced a model of the Stanier Mogul including the preserved example.

Initial releases from Bachmann Branchline include the LMS Black Lined version 31-690 in February 2017, BR Black early emblem and BR Black late emblem. Later liveries to follow.

== Bibliography ==
- Haresnape, Brian (1970). Stanier Locomotives. Ian Allan.
- Longworth, Hugh (2005). British Railway Steam Locomotives 1948–1968. ISBN 0-86093-593-0.
- Rowledge, J.W.P. (1975). Engines of the LMS built 1923–51. Oxford: Oxford Publishing Company. ISBN 0-902888-59-5.
- Sixsmith, Ian (August 2007). The Book Of The Stanier 2-6-0's. Irwell Press. ISBN 978-1-903266-80-9.
