= Moghol language =

Possibly extinct Mongolic language

Moghol
- Mogholi, Mogul, Mongul, Mongolen
- مُغُلی
- Native to: Afghanistan
- Region: Herat Province
- Ethnicity: Moghols
- Native speakers: ("few" cited 1982)
- Language family: Serbi–Mongolic: Mongolic; Moghol
- Dialects: Karez-I-Mulla; Kundur
- Writing system: Perso-Arabic script

Language codes
- ISO 639-3: mhj
- Glottolog: mogh1245
- ELP: Mogholi
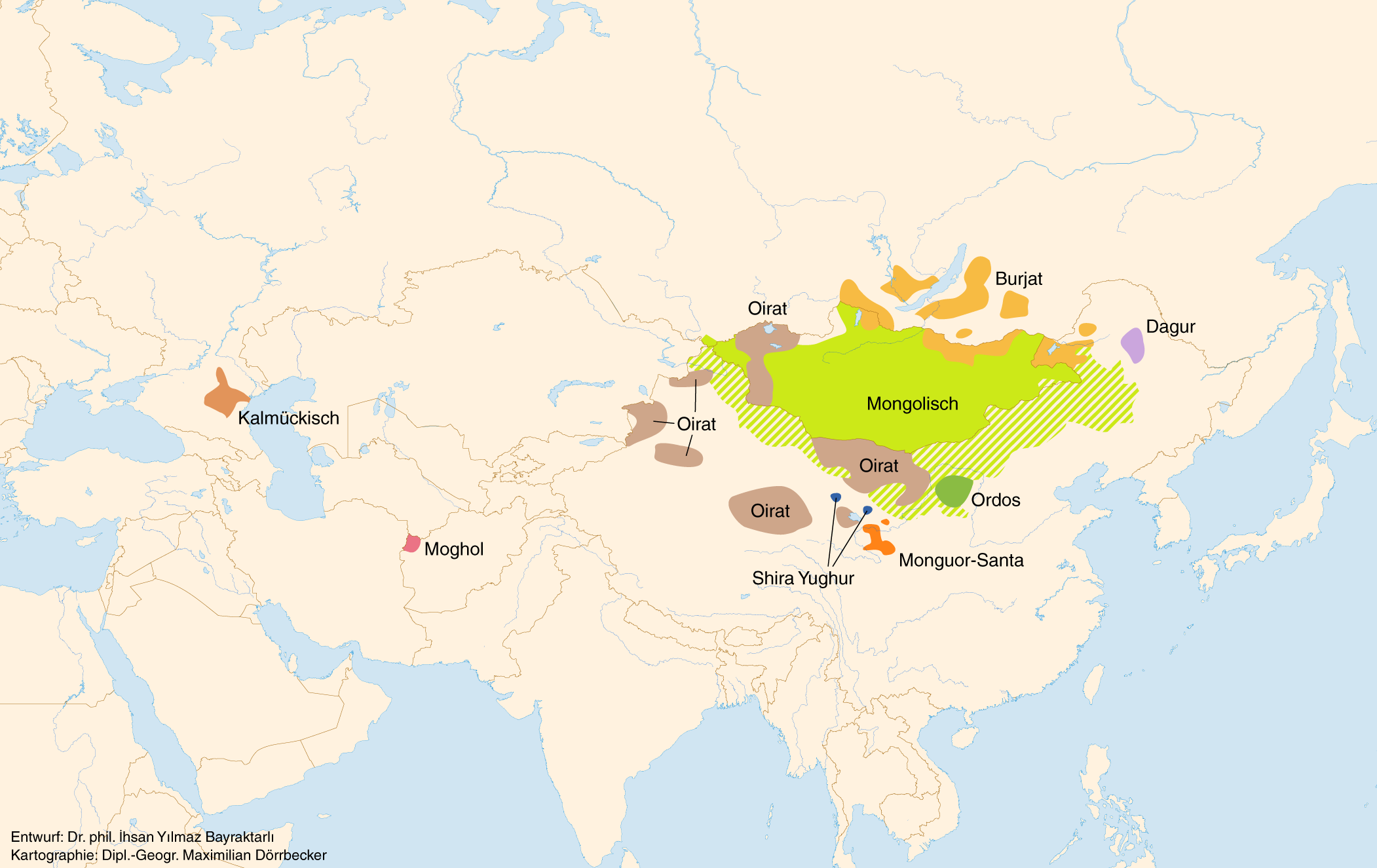
- Moghol

- Moghol is classified as Critically Endangered by the UNESCO Atlas of the World's Languages in Danger

Moghol (or Mogholi; Dari: مُغُلی) is a critically endangered and possibly extinct Mongolic language spoken in the province of Herat, Afghanistan, in the villages of Kundur and Karez-i-Mulla. The speakers were the Moghol people, who numbered 2,000 members in the 1970s. They descend from the Mongol army of Genghis Khan who conquered Afghanistan (then part of the Khwarazmian Empire) in the 13th century.

In the 1970s, when the German scholar Michael Weiers did fieldwork on the language, few people spoke it, most knew it passively and most were older than 40. By 1982, Moghol was nearly extinct; it had "survive[d] mainly as a language of folklore and memories". It is unknown if there are still speakers of the language, and it is listed as dormant by Ethnologue.

The language has been strongly influenced by Persian in its phonology, morphology and syntax, causing Weiers to state that it has the appearance of a "true Inner Asian creole language".

== Phonology ==
Moghol's phonology is influenced by Persian. It has a system of six vowel qualities with no length contrast: /i e a u o ɔ/.

Consonants
		Labial	Alveolar	Postalveolar/ Palatal	Velar	Uvular	Glottal
Plosive/ Affricate	voiceless	p	t	t͡ʃ	k	q	ʔ
Plosive/ Affricate	voiced	b	d	d͡ʒ	ɡ		
Fricative	voiceless	f	s	ʃ		χ	ɦ
Fricative	voiced		z	ʒ			ɦ
Nasal		m	n				
Approximant			l	j	w		
Trill			r			ʀ	

/ɦ/ may range between voiced [ɦ] and voiceless [h].

== Grammar ==
Moghol grammar shows substantial influence from Persian languages, having borrowed even word classes not found in other Mongolic languages: the parts of speech are nouns, verbs, adjectives, pronouns, prepositions, adverbs and conjunctions.

Nouns are marked for number and case. Verbs are marked for person, number, tense-aspect and mood. Adjectives inflect for the comparative and superlative degree with the Persian suffixes -tar and -tariin, but not for number and case.

== Vocabulary ==
=== Pronouns ===
The Moghol personal pronouns are:

person	singular	plural
1st	bi	bidah ~ bidat (inclusive); mån (exclusive)
2nd	ci	tå ~ tåd
3rd	i ~ ih	tid ~ tit

The demonstrative pronouns are:

- inah ~ enah ‘this’
- inat ~ enad ‘these’
- mun ~ munah ‘that’
- munat ~ mutah ~ mutat ‘those’

The interrogative pronouns are:

- emah ~ imah ~ imas ‘what’
- ken ~ kiyan ‘who’
- kenaiki ‘whose’
- emadu ~ imadu ~ emaji ~ imaji ~ emagalah ‘why’
- emaula- ‘to do what’
- ked ~ keddu ‘how much’
- keja ‘when’
- oshtin ‘how’

The reflexive pronouns are:

- orin ‘self’
- orindu-nah ‘for oneself’
- usa-nah ‘self’

=== Numerals ===
The Moghol numerals are Janhunen (2003):

	English gloss	Moghol	Proto-Mongolic	Modern Mongolian
1	one	nikah ~ nika/n	*nike/n	neg
2	two	qeyår ~ qiar	*koxar ~ *koyar	khoyor
3	three	ghorbån ~ qurban	*gurba/n	gurav
4	four	dorbån ~ durba/n	*dörbe/n	döröv
5	five	tåbun ~ tabun	*tabu/n	tav
6	six	åsun ~ essun ~ jurghan ~ shish	*jirguxa/n	zurgaa
7	seven	dålån ~ húft	*doluxa/n	doloo
8	eight	sålån ~ húshtu	*na(y)ima/n	naym
9	nine	tåsån ~ no	*yersü/n	yös
10	ten	arbån ~ arban ~ dá	*xarba/n	arav

== Sample ==
Weiers noted down the following poems by the Moghol poet Abd Al-Qadir.

Weiers' Moghol texts:

[dɔtʌnˈʌmnɪ dˈɔʀ baɪnʌ]
[hʌꞵˈoɪ ukˈinɪ aɪmˈʌʀ baɪnʌ]
[nɛʃɔnˈi ugˈunʌmbɪ. ˈʌgʌr tˈɔni bˈaɪdʃi]
[mˈɔtʌ gˈiri qʌrˈɔ qurʀˈʌnɪ bɛɪnʌ]

Ekimni dard kina halmini geibe
Bemoor boljambi kam khormini geibe
Bemoor boljambi kam khormini khodai jaan
Ena bemoreztu parwoimini geibe.

English translation from Weiers' German:

Inside my heart there is a wound
The girl I search and long for is of the Aimaq tribe
One sign I give you, if near her you happen to be
Know that in her ger (yurt) there is a black lamb

My head hurts, my condition is bad
I'm sick and do not care
I'm sick, but my concern is the love of God
This disease I give (therefore) no attention.

Another Moghol poem or song of Abd Al-Qadir written in Arabic alphabet (from Weiers):

Weiers' Moghol text:

Argun-i kulkah utalat Cingiz kulkah ulu’at
Nirah-ci-du kulkah gahat ya gaut al-a’zam gar bari
Karyas-du-ci kibah nudun lar-i dazam iz abatun
Mun abd qadir gai urun ya gaut al-a’zam gar bari

English translation from Weiers' German:

Lord of lords Arghun of old, Genghis king of kings
Under your name is all things old oh supreme mediator hold (my) hand
In your fence (camp) the eyes of suffering friends will rest
That same Abd Qadir rests peacefully oh supreme mediator hold (my) hand

== See also ==
- Nikudari
