= Moghol people =

Ethnic group in Afghanistan

Moghol
Regions with significant populations
- Afghanistan: 2,000 (1990 estimate)

Languages
- Moghol language, Dari Persian

Religion
- predominantly Sunni Islam

Related ethnic groups
- Mongolic peoples, Hazaras

The Moghols (also Mogols, Moghuls, Moguls, Monghuls, Monguls) are a Mongolic people in Afghanistan. They reside in the Kundur and Karez-e-Mulla villages of Herat province and in some parts of northern Afghanistan. They used to speak the Moghol language. They are descendants of the Mongol Empire's soldiers who conquered Afghanistan (then part of the Khwarazmian Empire). The Moghols sometimes call themselves "Shahjahan", because some of them joined the army of Mughal Emperor Shah Jahan. Previously, Moghol villages could be found in Ghor, throughout the Hazarajat, and as far east as Badakhshan.

== History ==
The ancestors of the Moghols established themselves in the region in the 13th and 14th centuries serving as soldiers during the Mongol conquests. They occupied Khwarazm and the area that soon become the Ilkhanate during this period. While the Moghols used to live throughout Afghanistan, their settlements were reduced to Herat by the mid-20th century. In recent decades, most Moghols have adopted the Dari language and the Moghol language may currently be extinct as a result.

By religion the Moghols are predominantly Sunni Muslims.

== See also ==
- Ethnic groups in Afghanistan
- Mogol (disambiguation)
- Qara'unas
