= Beevor =

Beevor as a surname may refer to:

- Antony Beevor (born 1946), British historian
- Charles Edward Beevor (1854–1908), English neurologist and anatomist
  - Beevor's axiom, the idea that the brain does not know muscles, only movements
  - Beevor's sign, characteristic of some types of spinal cord injury
- Humphry Beevor (1903–1965), 7th Bishop of Lebombo, Mozambique
- James Rigby Beevor (1811–1849), English colonist and pastoralist of South Australia, after whom Mount Beevor is named
- John Beevor (1845–1903), English first-class cricketer
- Miles Beevor (1900–1994), English solicitor, pilot and businessman
- Beevor baronets, created in 1784 for the prominent agriculturalist Thomas Beevor

== See also ==
- Belvoir (disambiguation)
- Beauvois (disambiguation)
