= LNER Class A4 4483 Kingfisher =

Kingfisher
Type and origin
- Power type: Steam
- Builder: LNER, Doncaster Works
- Serial number: 1848
- Build date: 26 December 1936
Specifications
- Configuration
  - Whyte: 4-6-2
  - UIC: 2'C1h3
- Gauge: 4 ft 8 1/2 in (1,435 mm) standard gauge
- Leading dia.: 3 ft 2 in (0.965 m)
- Driver dia.: 6 ft 8 in (2.032 m)
- Trailing dia.: 3 ft 8 in (1.118 m)
- Boiler pressure: 250 psi (1.72 MPa)
- Cylinders: Three
- Cylinder size: 18.5 in × 26 in (470 mm × 660 mm)
- Loco brake: Steam
- Train brakes: LNER: Vacuum
Performance figures
- Tractive effort: 35,455 lbf (157.7 kN)
Career
- Operators: LNER
- Class: A4
- Number in class: 35
- Numbers: LNER: 4483, 585, 24; BR: 60024
- Official name: Kingfisher
- Withdrawn: 5 September 1966
- Disposition: Scrapped

LNER Class A4 4483 Kingfisher was a Class A4 steam locomotive of the London and North Eastern Railway.

== History ==
Kingfisher was built at Doncaster Works in 1936 and entered service on 26 December of that year. Originally painted in LNER Apple Green livery but was repainted in Garter Blue livery in January 1938. It carried the name Kingfisher throughout its existence. After World War II it was renumbered as 24. On nationalisation it was allotted the British Railways number of 60024. Kingfisher was used in its final years to work express trains from Glasgow to Aberdeen, along with fellow class members 60019 Bittern and 60034 Lord Faringdon. The last of the A4 class in common use along with Bittern, it was withdrawn for scrapping on 5 September 1966 from Aberdeen Ferryhill shed (61B). However, due to a shortage of motive power available at the depot on 14 September 1966, Kingfisher worked the 08:25 Glasgow to Aberdeen return trip which heralded the final revenue earning service for an A4.

Geoff Drury's preservation plans were halted when problems were discovered with the engine's boiler and firebox and the locomotive was delivered to scrap merchants Hughes Bolckow of North Blyth in late November, being cut up in February 1967.
