= Beavor =

Beavor is a surname. Notable people with the surname include:

- Edmond Beavor (died 1745), British Royal Navy captain
- John Beavor-Webb (c.1849–1927), Irish-American naval architect

== See also ==
- Beaver (surname)
- Beavon
- Beevor
