= LNER Class A4 4496 Dwight D Eisenhower =

Preserved LNER Class A4 locomotive

Dwight D Eisenhower
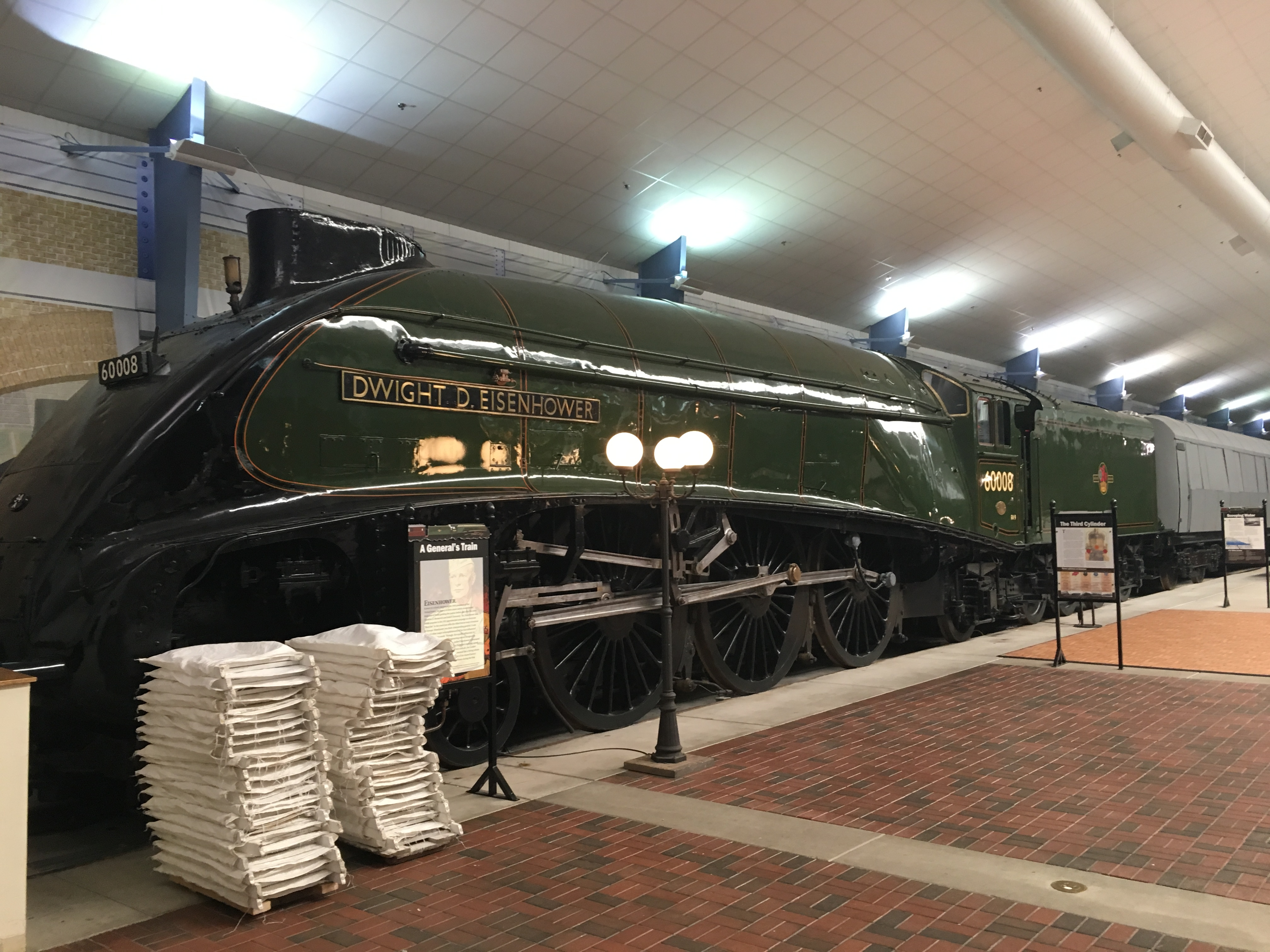
- Dwight D. Eisenhower on display at the National Railroad Museum on 10 July 2017, three years after its return from the United Kingdom
Type and origin
- Power type: Steam
- Builder: Doncaster Works
- Serial number: 1861
- Build date: 4 September 1937
Specifications
- Configuration
  - Whyte: 4-6-2
  - UIC: 2′C1 h3
- Gauge: 4 ft 8 1/2 in (1,435 mm) standard gauge
- Leading dia.: 3 ft 2 in (0.965 m)
- Driver dia.: 6 ft 8 in (2.032 m)
- Trailing dia.: 3 ft 8 in (1.118 m)
- Fuel type: Coal
- Boiler pressure: 250 psi (1.72 MPa)
- Cylinders: Three
- Cylinder size: 18.5 in × 26 in (470 mm × 660 mm)
- Loco brake: Steam
- Train brakes: Vacuum
Performance figures
- Tractive effort: 35,455 lbf (157.7 kN)
Career
- Operators: LNER → BR
- Class: A4
- Number in class: 19 of 35
- Numbers: LNER 4496; LNER 8 (from 1946); BR 60008 (from 1948)
- Official name: Golden Shuttle, Dwight D Eisenhower
- Withdrawn: 20 July 1963
- Current owner: National Railroad Museum
- Disposition: On static display

60008 Dwight D Eisenhower is an LNER Class A4 steam locomotive named after Dwight D. Eisenhower, a General of the United States Army.

Built for the London & North Eastern Railway in 1937, this locomotive was originally numbered 4496 and named Golden Shuttle. It was renamed Dwight D. Eisenhower after World War II and renumbered 8 on 23 November 1946, under Edward Thompson's LNER 1946 renumbering scheme. After nationalisation in 1948, British Railways renumbered it 60008 on 29 October 1948. It was retired from service in 1963 and was moved to the National Railroad Museum in Ashwaubenon, a suburb of Green Bay, Wisconsin, United States, where it is currently on display. It returned to England in 2012 for display at the National Railway Museum in York, when all surviving A4s were reunited. It returned to Green Bay in 2014.

== Liveries ==
Like the other members of the A4 class, Dwight D. Eisenhower has carried numerous liveries during its career. When first introduced into traffic on 4 September 1937, locomotive 4496 was named Golden Shuttle and painted in LNER garter blue with stainless steel trim on the base of the valances and tender. The numbers and LNER lettering on the tender were also stainless steel. This livery design was also used on the A4s that were named after countries, on the Coronation service in order to match with the rolling stock.

4496's next livery was wartime black with 'LNER' on the tender, applied 30 January 1942. This livery was modified to read just 'NE' on the tender in a repaint on 12 March 1943. LNER garter blue was reapplied 25 September 1945 and the name Dwight D. Eisenhower applied, but the name was covered until February 1946. The next livery applied was British Railways dark blue livery with black and white lining on 14 June 1950. The final livery applied was British Railways Brunswick green, applied 9 November 1951.

Dwight D. Eisenhower had a non-standard red background to the nameplate c. 1958. During its time allocated to Grantham motive power depot, the name of the depot was stencilled on the buffer beam.

== Technical details ==
Like all the early A4 locomotives prior to Mallard, Golden Shuttle was released to service with a single chimney and side valances covering the wheels. The valances were removed to aid in maintenance during a general overhaul on 30 January 1942. Experimental Automatic Train Control equipment was fitted on 23 June 1950. A double chimney and Kylchap double blastpipe was installed to help performance, during an overhaul 20 August 1958. A Smith-Stone type speed indicator was installed 30 June 1960.

Dwight D. Eisenhower has had eleven boilers during its career: 8959 (from new); 8945 (from 4482 Golden Eagle), 30 January 1942; 8906 (spare) from 23 November 1946; 8955 (from 60026 Miles Beevor), 14 June 1950; 29314 (new), 9 November 1951; 29303 (from 60020 Guillemot) 18 June 1954; 29296 (from 60033 Seagull), 8 July 1955; 29308 (from 60030 Golden Fleece), 20 December 1956; 29312 (from 60010 Dominion of Canada), 20 August 1958; 27964 (new), 30 June 1960 and finally 29335 (from 60019 Bittern), 17 May 1962.

Dwight D. Eisenhower had two tenders during its career: 5651 from new and 5671 from 1 April 1957.

== Career ==
Locomotive 4496 was to have been named Sparrow Hawk, but it was instead named Golden Shuttle. Sparrow Hawk was later used on 4463. On 25 September 1945, locomotive 4496 was ex-works and the next day was at Marylebone station for the directors of the LNER to view it. The nameplates were covered and it was intended that the Supreme Commander, Allied Forces would attend an official unveiling, but this could not be arranged.

From new, Golden Shuttle was allocated to Doncaster shed for just nine days from 20 to 29 September 1937. It was transferred to Kings Cross Top Shed until 4 December 1939, when it was reallocated to Grantham. On 4 June 1950, Dwight D. Eisenhower was reallocated back to Top Shed. On 7 April 1957, it moved back to Grantham until it was sent back to 'Top Shed' on 15 September 1957. Its final depot allocation was New England shed in Peterborough from 16 June 1963.

On 4 October 1962, Dwight D. Eisenhower hauled a special train from Stratford station in East London to York, after being specially cleaned by Kings Cross Top Shed staff. It was withdrawn from service on 20 July 1963. By this time, the Deltic diesel electric locomotives had displaced steam from premier services, so the A4 fleet was reduced and concentrated further north. Dwight D. Eisenhower was donated to the United States of America and sent to Doncaster Works for restoration.

== Preservation ==
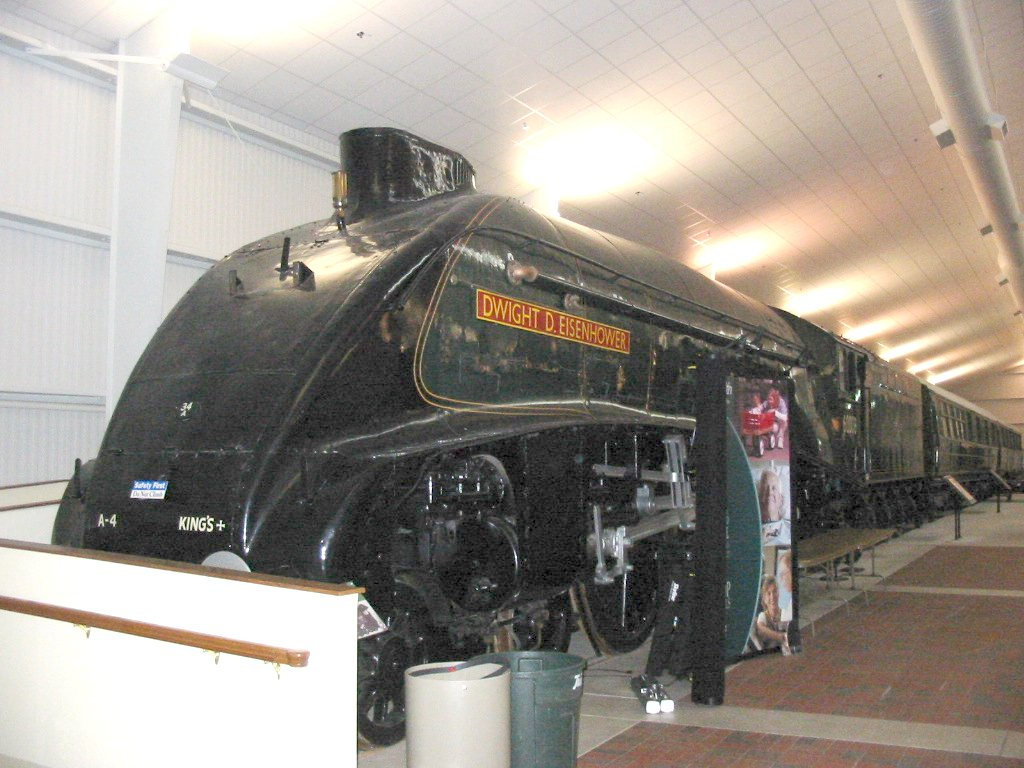
LNER/British Railways A4 No. 60008 Dwight D. Eisenhower on display at the National Railroad Museum on 26 April 2004

Earmarked for the National Railroad Museum in Ashwaubenon, a suburb of Green Bay, Wisconsin, the locomotive was cosmetically restored at Doncaster Works on 19 July 1963. The following spring, it was shipped to the US, arriving in New York Harbor on 11 May 1964. Shipped by rail, it arrived at the museum later that month. In October 1990, it was moved to Abilene, Kansas for the celebrations of the centenary of Eisenhower's birth. The move both ways was done as a special train at slow speed, since the locomotive and two cars from the command train used the British vacuum braking system, which was incompatible with the American air-braked trains.

The locomotive is displayed with two British passenger carriages, once used as part of Eisenhower's Command Train. These have been restored to the condition they were in when used by Eisenhower.

There have been some efforts to repatriate the locomotive back to the UK, most of which have been unsuccessful. However, in 2012, the National Railway Museum announced plans to repatriate the engine, along with 60010, which has been preserved in Canada, as part of a plan to reunite all six preserved A4s of the class for the 75th anniversary of the class's world record breaking 126 mph run. Both 60008 and 60010 were loaned to the National Railway Museum for a period of two years, returning to North America in early 2014. While at York, the locomotive was cosmetically overhauled and received a new coat of authentic BR Brunswick Green paint to replace the inaccurate shade applied during a repaint at Green Bay. The background on the Dwight D. Eisenhower nameplates was also changed from a red colour to a black colour.

In mid-August 2012, 60008 left its base in the Green Bay area and travelled to Halifax, Nova Scotia, where it met with 60010 arriving by rail in late September. On 3 October 2012, Nos. 60008 and 60010 arrived back in the UK at the Port of Liverpool. On 4 October 2012, 60008 began its journey to the National Railway Museum Shildon, arriving that evening. The locomotive moved to York soon after for its cosmetic restoration.

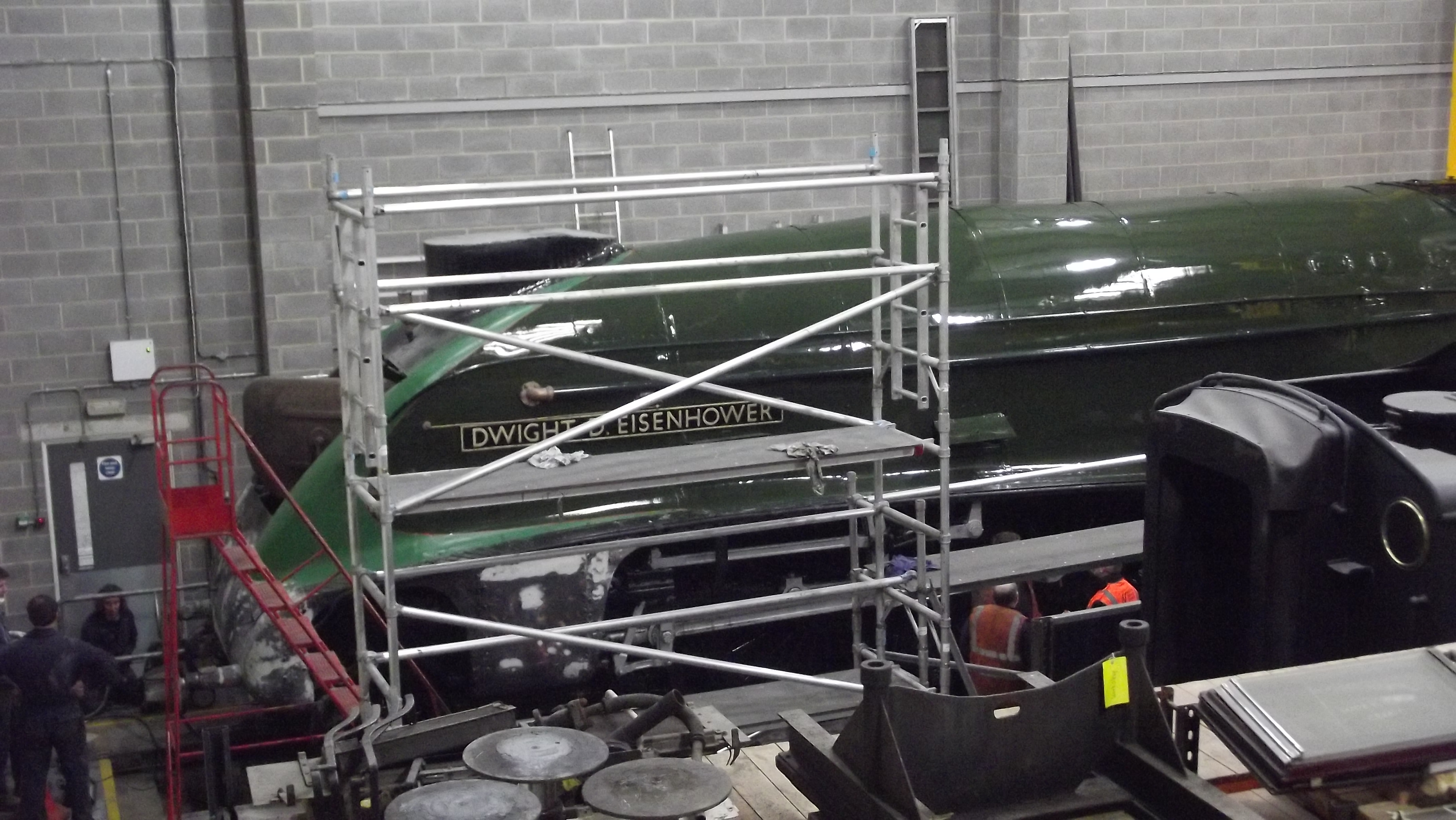
The engine under cosmetic restoration in December 2012

The loco's cosmetic restoration was completed in February 2013 and the loco was then put on display in the Great Hall at the National Railway Museum in York, next to sister engine 4468 Mallard. 60008 and 4468 were later to meet up with the other four members of the class in a 2-week event at York from 3 July, called 'The Great Gathering', 75 years to the day that Mallard set the World Speed Steam record. Both 60008 and 60010 appeared at Barrow Hill Engine Shed along with Bittern (60019), as part of the 'East Coast Giants' event over the weekend of 8/9 February 2014.

In August 2013, the move of the two North American-based A4s back to the UK was the subject of an episode of the television series Monster Moves.

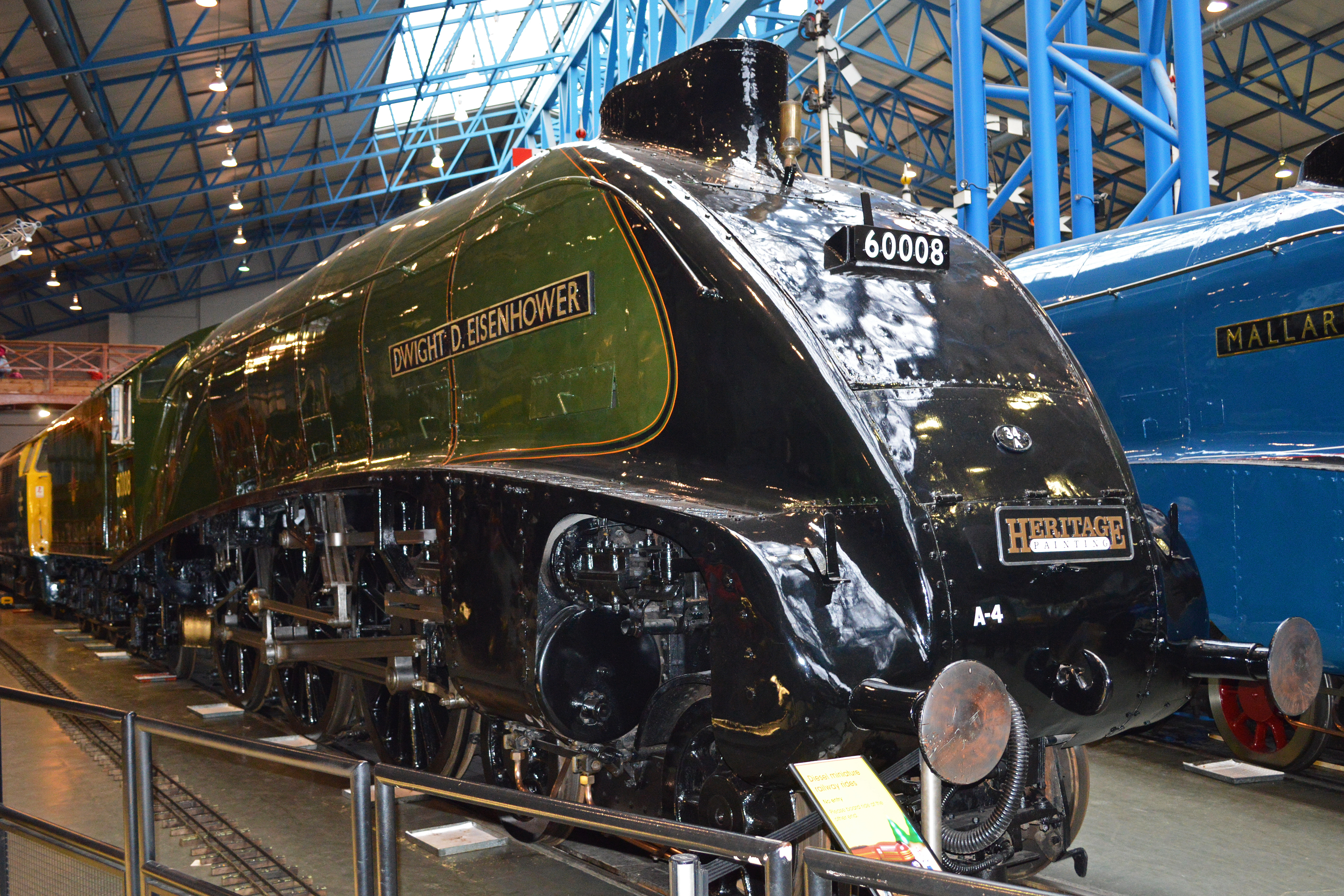
LNER Class A4 4496 Dwight D Eisenhower at the National Railway Museum in York

The final event in which 60008 was reunited with its five remaining A4 sisters was the 'Great Goodbye', held between 15 and 23 February 2014, at The National Railway Museum's Locomotion annex at Shildon. During this time, the National Railroad Museum was offered US$1 million by an undisclosed buyer for the engine to remain in the UK. The museum declined the offer and the engine remained on display at Shildon until mid-April 2014. The engine, along with 60010 (which had been restored to its original number, 4489, as part of the exhibition plans) were covered in two layers of tarpaulins to protect and conceal them. In late April-early May, the covered engines were sent to the Port of Liverpool where they were loaded aboard the Atlantic Container Line's Atlantic Concert vessel for the voyage to Halifax. The engines were unloaded at the ports in Halifax on 11 May, where they were transferred on to flat cars to be taken by rail to their respective museums. 60008 arrived at the National Railroad Museum in the Green Bay suburb of Ashwaubenon on 6 June 2014 and, on 23 June, the museum had returned the engine to the display building in which it was displayed prior to leaving for the UK. The museum officially unveiled the engine as part of a new World War II themed exhibit on 2 August 2014.

== Modelling ==
In 2012 Bachmann released a model of 60008 to celebrate its return to the UK and in 2013 Hornby also released a limited-edition model of 60008 along with the other 5 surviving A4s. In 2015, Hornby also released a model of it in its original garter blue livery and name, Golden Shuttle.
