= LNER Class A4 4489 Dominion of Canada =

Preserved British steam locomotive

Dominion of Canada
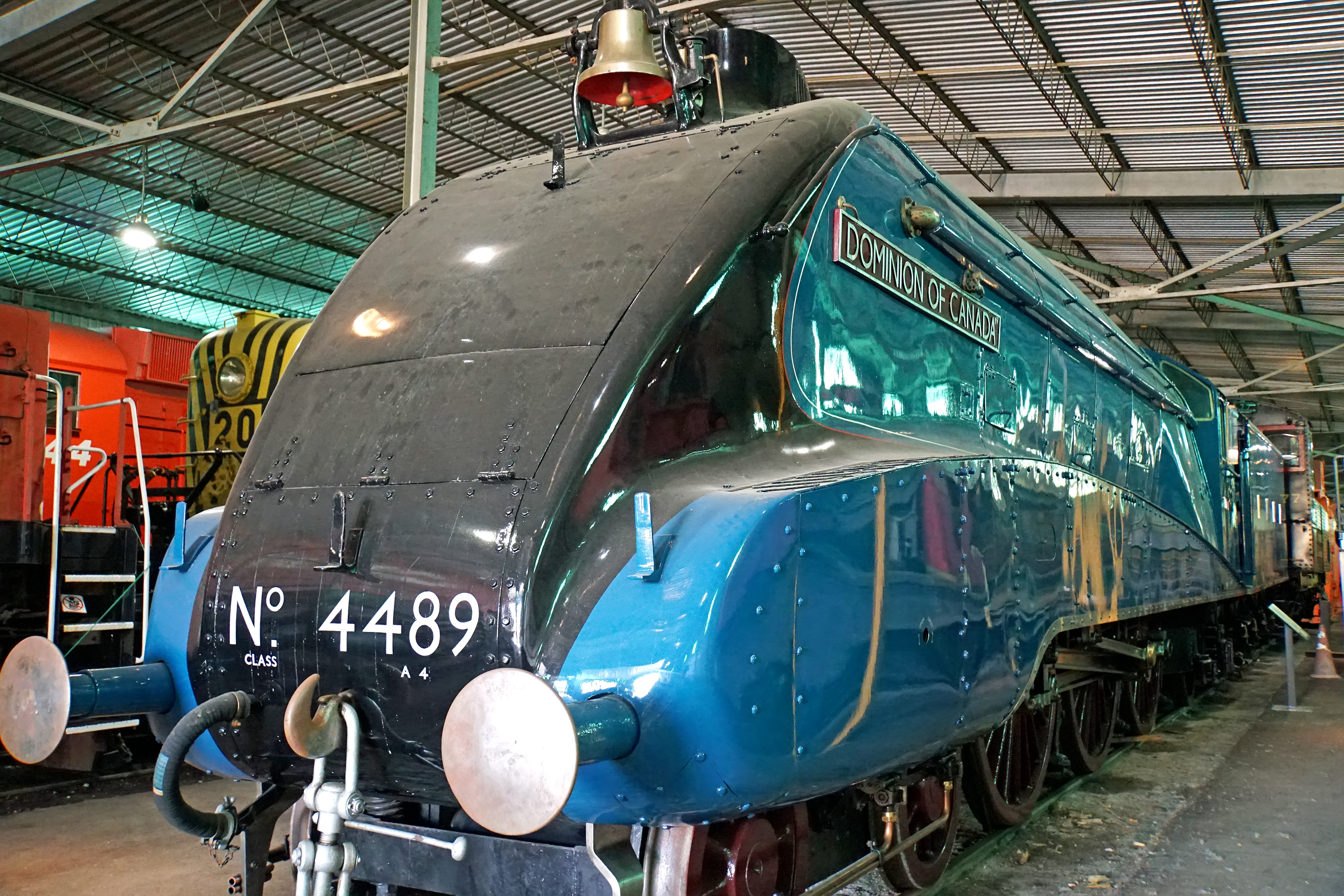
- Dominion of Canada at the Canadian Railway Museum in its restored garter blue livery
Type and origin
- Power type: Steam
- Builder: LNER, Doncaster Works
- Serial number: 1854
- Build date: 24 May 1937
Specifications
- Configuration
  - Whyte: 4-6-2
  - UIC: 2'C1h3
- Gauge: 4 ft 8 1/2 in (1,435 mm) standard gauge
- Leading dia.: 3 ft 2 in (0.965 m)
- Driver dia.: 6 ft 8 in (2.032 m)
- Trailing dia.: 3 ft 8 in (1.118 m)
- Boiler pressure: 250 psi (1.72 MPa)
- Cylinders: Three
- Cylinder size: 18.5 in × 26 in (470 mm × 660 mm)
- Loco brake: Steam
- Train brakes: Vacuum
Performance figures
- Tractive effort: 35,455 lbf (157.7 kN)
Career
- Operators: London and North Eastern Railway, British Railways
- Class: A4
- Number in class: 11 of 35
- Numbers: LNER 4489, LNER 10, BR 60010
- Official name: Dominion of Canada
- Withdrawn: 29 May 1965
- Current owner: Canadian Railway Museum
- Disposition: Static display at the Canadian Railway Museum in Saint-Constant, Quebec, Canada

4489 Dominion of Canada is an LNER Class A4 steam locomotive. It is a 4-6-2 locomotive built to the same design by Sir Nigel Gresley as the more famous Mallard. There were 35 A4 locomotives built in total. Originally numbered 4489, it was renumbered 10 on 10 May 1946, under the LNER 1946 renumbering scheme of Edward Thompson and, after nationalisation in 1948, British Railways added 60000 to its number so it became 60010 on 27 October 1948. It was renumbered back to 4489 following a cosmetic restoration at the National Railway Museum in York during late 2012 and early 2013.

== Career ==
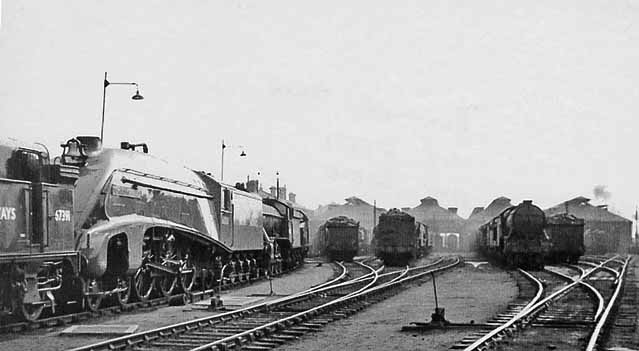
No. 60010 Dominion of Canada (left) at Doncaster shed in 1949

The locomotive was built in Doncaster works in May 1937 as Works Number 1854. It was originally to be named Buzzard but initially received the name Woodcock instead until it was renamed Dominion of Canada by High Commissioner of Canada, H. Vincent Massey on 15 June 1937. No. 4489 underwent trials, the only one of the 'Coronation' A4s so treated, and left in works grey lined in white. It had apple green painted coupled wheels. At this point it wore the name Woodcock, but this was removed before final painting and release to traffic. The Canadian Pacific Railway issue whistle was fitted 15 July 1937 for the unveiling and naming. The CPR-type bell fitted was steam operated and was actually used, as a photograph from 19 August 1939, illustrates. In 1937, locomotive 4489 was the locomotive used to try and take back the speed record previously taken by the LMS' passenger train, the Coronation Scot, which clocked at 114 mph (183 km/h). Unfortunately, Locomotive 4489 achieved 109.5 mph (176 km/h) down Stoke Bank. It suffered damage in a collision at Hatfield and required attention at Doncaster Works from 31 January to 18 March 1939.

Allocated to Kings Cross from new, it was reallocated to Grantham on 7 April 1957. The next shed was Kings Cross again on 15 September 1957. New England was the next allocation on 16 June 1963, after the closure of Kings Cross. The final allocation was to Aberdeen on 20 October 1963 to be used, along with other displaced A4s, primarily for the three-hour Aberdeen to Glasgow express service.

== Liveries ==
Dominion of Canada has worn many liveries throughout its career. When released into traffic on 4 May 1937, No. 4489 wore the "paint shop grey" livery with apple green wheels until two weeks later when it was repainted in garter blue livery. The coat of arms of Canada was on the side of the cab and a CPR-type bell mounted ahead of the single chimney. As a livery variation, a stainless steel strip ran along the bottom of the valances and tender and the numbers and letters of the locomotive and tender were also stainless steel. This was due to the use of this locomotive and the other A4s named after British Commonwealth countries, on the Coronation service in order to match with the rolling stock. Other A4s named after British Commonwealth countries were (BR numbers) 60009 Union of South Africa, 60011 Empire of India, 60012 Commonwealth of Australia and 60013 Dominion of New Zealand. The bell was removed from 60010 Dominion of Canada when the chimney was replaced with a Kylchap double blastpipe and chimney on 27 December 1957. The stainless steel strip was removed along with the valances, but was left on the tender and simply painted over. Due to the position of the cab side coat of arms, the works plates were relocated inside the cab. The coat of arms of Canada worn on the side of the cabs was removed on 8 April 1949, but the works plates remained inside the cab.

The next livery worn was wartime black with LNER on the tender on 21 February 1942. On 27 November 1943, the livery was modified to read just 'NE'. Dominion of Canada regained its LNER garter blue livery on 20 November 1947. British Railways dark blue with black and white lining was applied on 29 September 1950. The final livery change was British Railways Brunswick green on 8 May 1952.

== Technical details ==
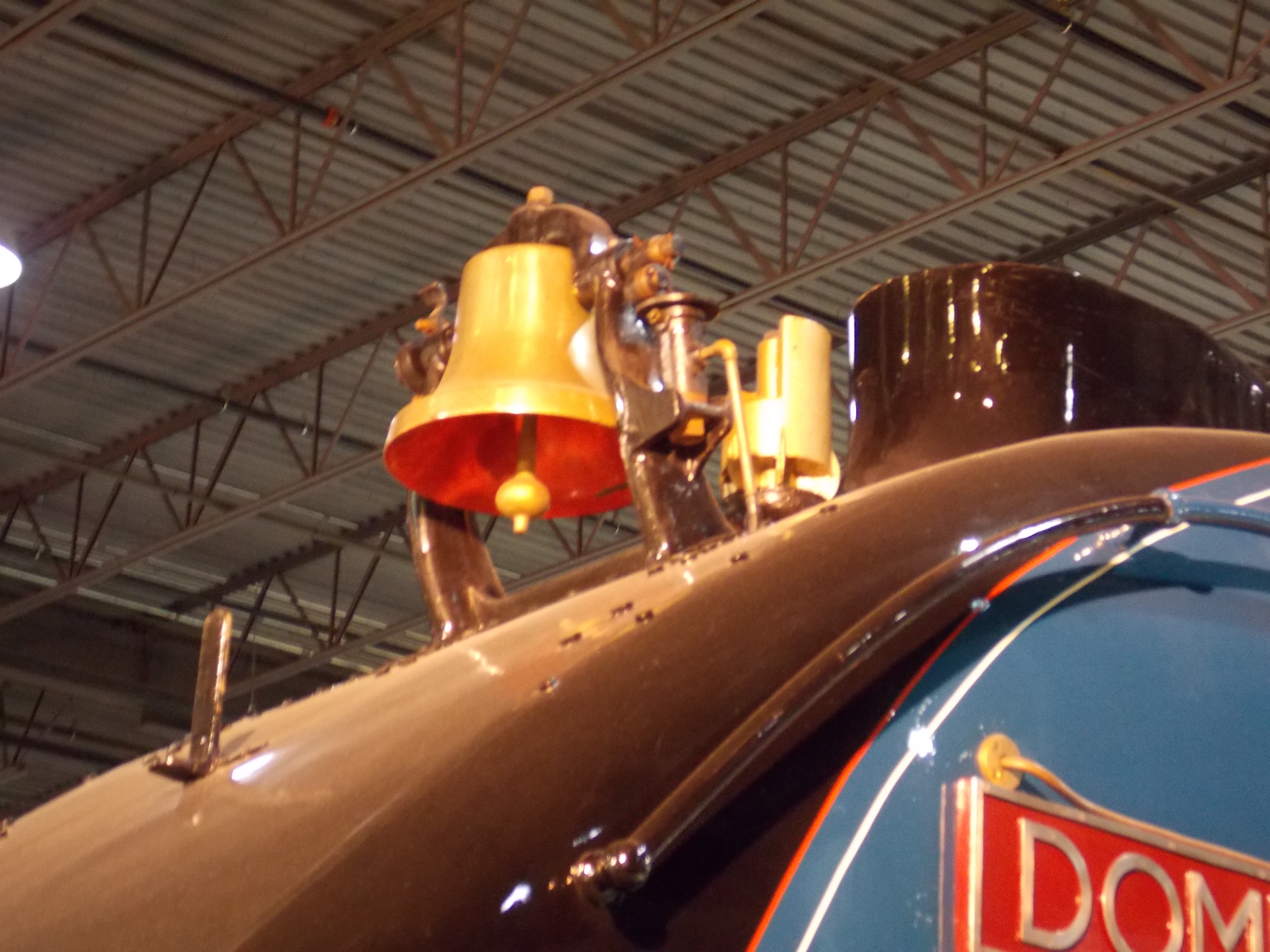
Dominion of Canada's CPR Bell and 5 Chime Whistle, reinstalled in 2013. Seen here in July 2017.

Dominion of Canada had the Canadian Pacific Railway-type bell and 5-chime whistle removed in 1957 when the engine was refitted with a double chimney and Kylchap exhaust to improve its steaming performance. The 5-chime whistle, which was replaced by a standard 3-chime whistle, was used at the whistles trial in Stratford for the new proposed British Railways 'Standard' Class locomotives and the bell was stored at Doncaster works.

Dominion of Canada had eleven boilers throughout its career: 8952 (from new); 8908 (from 2510 Quicksilver), 21 February 1942; 9126 (from 4482 Golden Eagle), 10 May 1946; 9018 (from 19 Bittern), 8 April 1949; 29273 (from 60014 Silver Link), 29 September 1950; 29321 (New build), 27 August 1953; 29323 (from 60014 Silver Link), 17 February 1955; 29312 (from 60018 Sparrow Hawk), 1 June 1956; 29272 (from 60002 Sir Murrough Wilson), 27 December 1957; 29307 (from 60028 Walter K. Whigham), 10 July 1959; and finally 27970 (from 60007 Sir Nigel Gresley), 5 December 1962.

Dominion of Canada had six tenders through its career: 5326 from new, 5328 from 6 December 1937, 5647 from 29 June 1953, 5639 from 9 July 1953, 5328 from 27 August 1953 and lastly 5326 from 15 October 1960.

Dominion of Canada had its side valances removed on 21 February 1942. A Smith-Stone speed indicator was added on 15 October 1960.

== Preservation ==
In May 1965, Dominion of Canada was sent to Darlington Works for repairs. However, its boiler was discovered to be in poor condition and the engine was instead withdrawn and on 5 July, it was marked in Darlington's records as 'for sale to be scrapped'. After 60010 was condemned and its double chimney was removed for either No. 60024 Kingfisher or No. 60004 William Whitelaw, both in the works at that time, it was placed behind Darlington motive power depot and forgotten. For many months it was left lying derelict, almost totally hidden in the weeds and rough bushes at the end of a siding from the MPD, nose into the embankment of the Haughton Road bridge in Darlington. Despite this being a busy main road, very few people were aware of the engine being enveloped by the undergrowth. Sometime after Darlington MPD was closed on 26 March 1966, No. 60010 was moved to Crewe works on 27 April for cosmetic restoration and repainted in BR Brunswick green livery due to the LNER garter blue livery's expense.

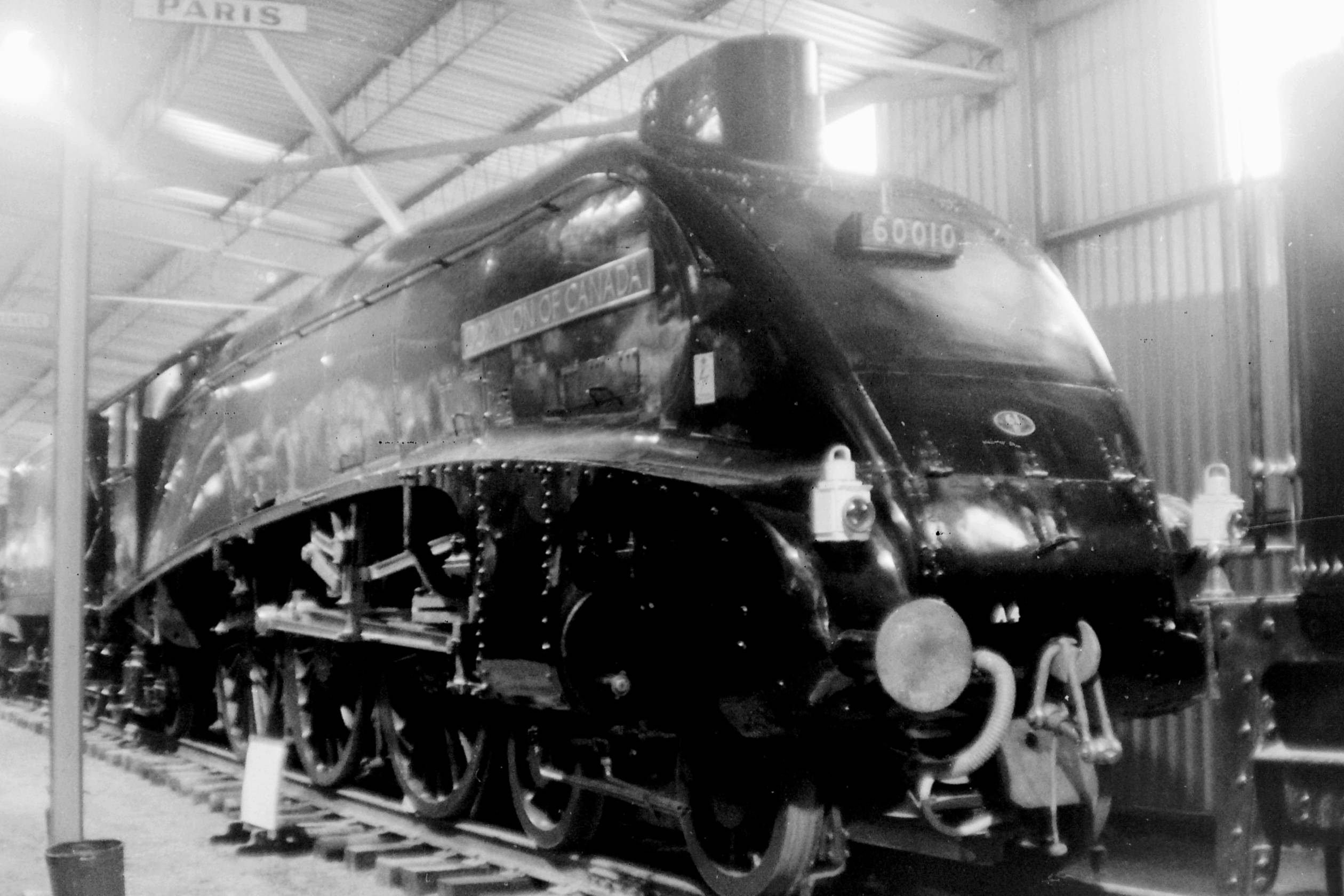
No. 60010 Dominion of Canada on display at Exporail in August 1970

She was donated to the Canadian Railroad Historical Association (CRHA) by British Railways. Since May 1966, 60010 has been preserved by the CRHA at the Canadian Railway Museum at Delson/Saint-Constant, Quebec, near Montreal. The CPR bell and 5-chime whistle were shipped out with 60010, but they were not refitted due to the double chimney obscuring the bell's original position. Stored in a secure building with other equipment and locomotives, the engine ended up in a very poor cosmetic state, its front end in particular was badly damaged by a diesel engine's buckeye coupler when being moved into the building in 2008. A cosmetic restoration was originally planned for 2010, but for unknown reasons, did not go ahead.

In 2011, the National Railway Museum in York announced that it would be bringing back 60010 (along with fellow A4 Dwight D Eisenhower ) to the UK for a 2-year period to celebrate the 75th anniversary of the record-breaking run of its classmate Mallard. The event marked the first time that all six surviving A4s had been together since preservation, and for 60010, marked the opportunity to reunite it with fellow Coronation engine 60009 Union of South Africa.

In September 2012, 60010 was sent from the Canadian Railway Museum down to the docks in Halifax, Nova Scotia where it was reunited with 60008, and both were shipped at the end of September. After arriving back in the UK on the evening of 2 October 2012, both locomotives were unloaded the following morning at Liverpool Docks, where a press call had been arranged.

On Saturday 6 October 2012, 60010 arrived at Shildon for brief display, after which its cosmetic restoration was carried out. On 19–20 October 2012, Union of South Africa visited Shildon as well, so that a line up of three Brunswick Green A4s could take place for the first time since the end of Eastern steam in 1966 - it was originally planned to be an earlier event and also feature 60007 Sir Nigel Gresley, but the A4s' shipping date was delayed, so 60007 could not be secured for the date due to commitments at the North Yorkshire Moors Railway.

No. 4489's cosmetic restoration returned the locomotive to its original Coronation livery - LNER Garter Blue with her original number 4489, complete with side valances, single chimney, and stainless chrome trim, as well as chrome lettering and numbering. It was refitted with a Canadian-style chime whistle, and the commemorative bell that was originally removed when it was fitted with a double chimney and sent with the locomotive to Canada, but had not been reinstalled due to it still having the double chimney at the time. The original boxes used to send the bell and bell mount to Canada were used to bring them back to the UK.

In 2013, 60010's (now renumbered 4489) cosmetic restoration was completed, and it was placed on display alongside Dwight D. Eisenhower and Mallard ready for the Mallard '75 celebrations later that year, where all six preserved A4's joined the display around the turntable inside the National Railway Museum.

The story of the repatriation of Nos. 4489 and 60008 was covered in an episode of the documentary series Monster Moves. Both 60008 and 60010 appeared at Barrow Hill roundhouse along with Bittern (60019) as part of the "East Coast Giants" event over the weekend of 8/9 February 2014.

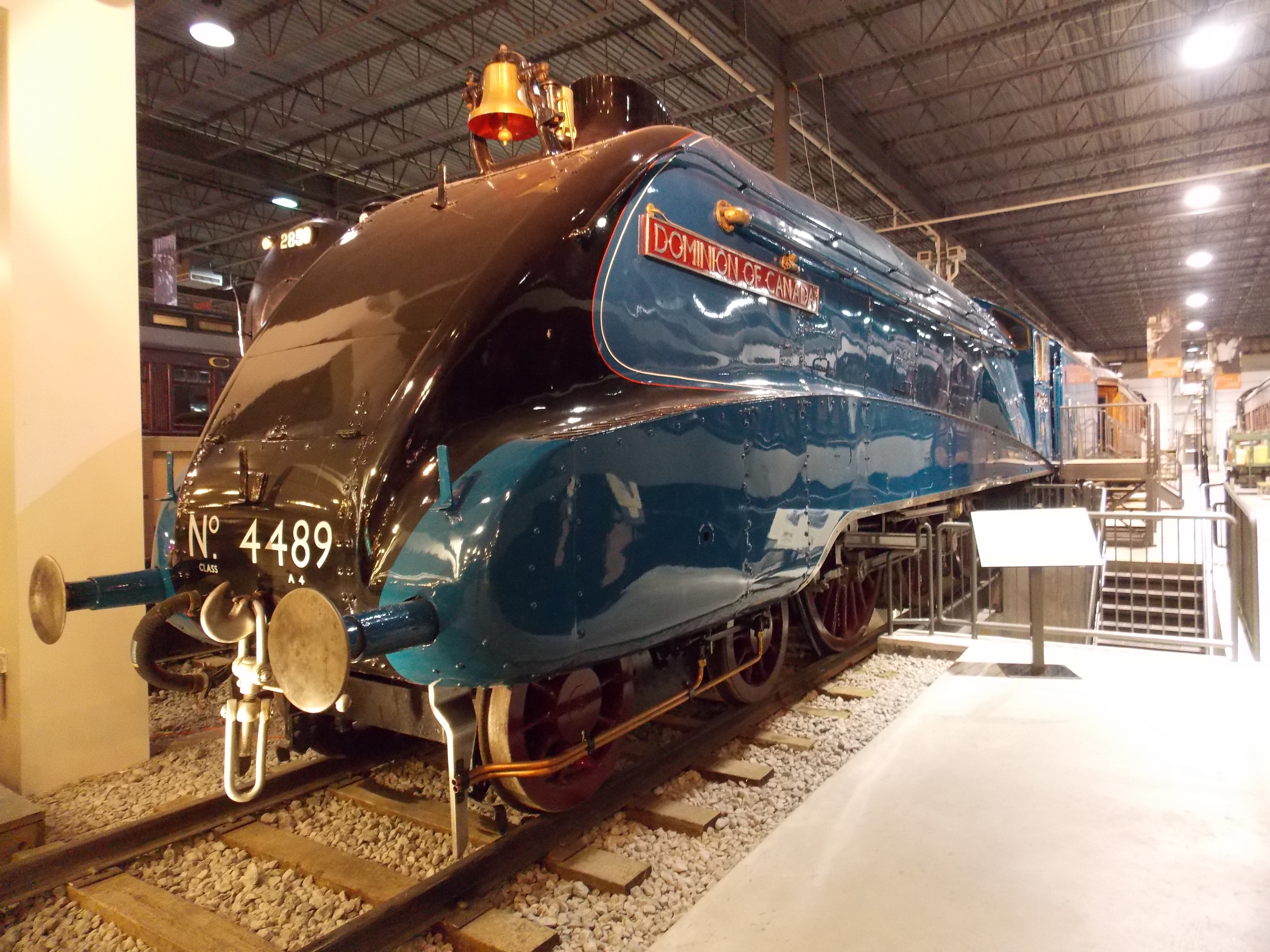
LNER 4489 Dominion of Canada, seen at Exporail. (July 2017)

4489 was reunited with her five remaining A4 siblings for the final time at The National Railway Museum's Locomotion facility at Shildon for "The Great Goodbye" held 15–23 February 2014. After the exhibition, the engine and 60008 remained on display at Shildon until 24 April 2014, after which the engines were covered with dual-layered tarpaulins in preparation for their return journey. In late April-early May, the covered engines were sent to Port of Liverpool where they were loaded aboard the Atlantic Container Line's Atlantic Concert vessel for the voyage to Halifax. The engines were unloaded at the ports in Halifax on 11 May 2014, where they were transferred on to flat cars to be taken by rail to their respective museums. No. 4489 arrived at the Canadian Railway Museum on 4 June 2014.
