= LNER Class A4 4469 Sir Ralph Wedgwood =

LNER Class A4 locomotive

Sir Ralph Wedgwood
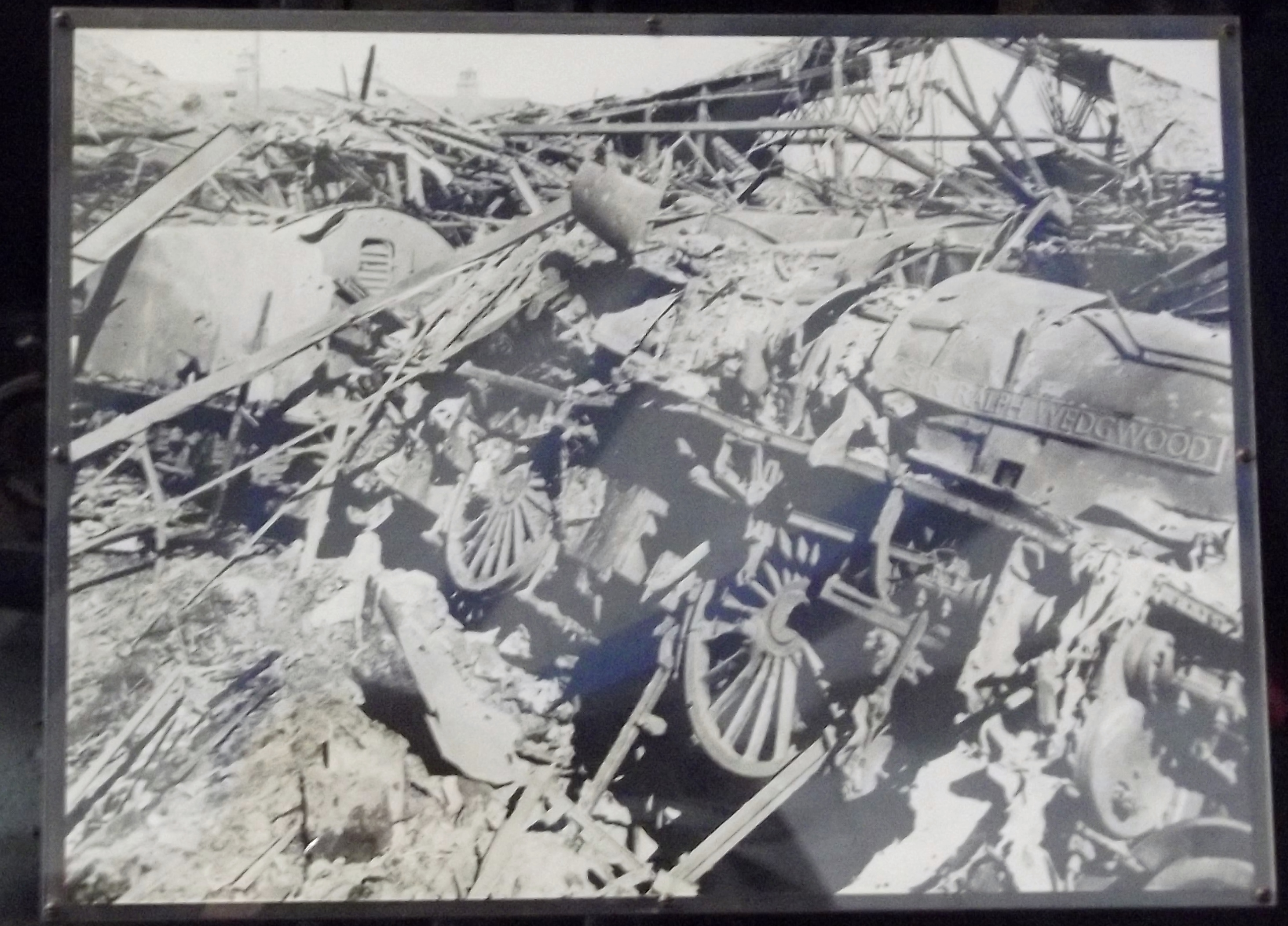
Type and origin
- Power type: Steam
- Builder: Doncaster Works
- Serial number: 1871
- Build date: 30 March 1938
Specifications
- Configuration
  - Whyte: 4-6-2
  - UIC: 2'C1h3
- Gauge: 4 ft 8 1/2 in (1,435 mm) standard gauge
- Leading dia.: 3 ft 2 in (0.965 m)
- Driver dia.: 6 ft 8 in (2.032 m)
- Trailing dia.: 3 ft 8 in (1.118 m)
- Boiler pressure: 250 psi (1.72 MPa)
- Cylinders: Three
- Cylinder size: 18.5 in × 26 in (470 mm × 660 mm)
- Loco brake: Steam
- Train brakes: LNER: Vacuum
Performance figures
- Tractive effort: 35,455 lbf (157.7 kN)
Career
- Operators: LNER
- Class: A4
- Numbers: LNER 4469
- Official name: Sir Ralph Wedgwood (formerly Gadwall)
- Disposition: Scrapped after being hit by a bomb in 1942.

LNER Class A4 No. 4469 Sir Ralph Wedgwood was one of 35 A4 class locomotives of the London & North Eastern Railway. Built at the company's Doncaster Works, it was originally named Gadwall, but was renamed Sir Ralph Wedgwood in March 1939 in recognition of his 16 years of service as Chief Officer of the LNER between 1923 and 1939.

== Construction and entry to service ==
No. 4469 was built at Doncaster as builder's number 1871 in 1938. It received the name Gadwall, and was allocated to Gateshead shed on completion. It was paired with non-corridor tender No. 5672 built new in 1938; as one of the A4 class locomotives built for general express duties it was painted in Garter blue.

In March 1939, No. 4469 was officially renamed Sir Ralph Wedgwood shortly before Sir Ralph's retirement. This was one of three locomotives to be named after LNER officials in that year; the others were No. 4499 Sir Murrough Wilson (originally Pochard, renamed April 1939) and 4500 Sir Ronald Matthews (formerly Garganey, renamed March 1939). Following the outbreak of World War II, No. 4469 initially retained its garter blue livery before being repainted into wartime black. The valances over the driving wheels were removed for ease of access to the locomotive's valve gear.

== Baedeker Raid ==
In late April 1942, No. 4469 received repairs at Doncaster Works and was temporarily allocated to Doncaster shed for running in on local services before returning to Gateshead. It was stabled at York North Shed on the night of 28/29 April 1942, the night of the Baedeker raid on York. York station and North Shed were bombed; No. 4469 and another nearby engine, B16 class No. 925 were damaged after a bomb fell through the shed roof and exploded between the two engines.

The locomotive was severely damaged as a result of the explosion, but it was recovered and towed to Doncaster shortly afterwards. Due to the degree of damage, it was considered impractical to rebuild No. 4469, and the locomotive was condemned and later scrapped. Tender No. 5672, attached to No. 4469 since new in 1938, was stored at Doncaster until 1945, when it was then rebuilt, given the new tender number 703 and attached to LNER Thompson Class A2/1 No. 3696 Highland Chieftain. The chime whistle was also removed and fitted to Y8 class 0-4-0T No. 560 as a trial.

== Replacement and commemoration ==
Following the scrapping of No. 4469 Sir Ralph Wedgwood, one of its damaged nameplates was rescued from scrap by a member of the Doncaster workshops staff for preservation at his home. It was later sold by his grandson in the early 2000s, with speculation that the National Railway Museum would seek to obtain it; the NRM subsequently were unable to purchase it and it became part of a private collection. A new set of nameplates were made 2 years later in 1944 and fitted to A4 No. 4466, formerly named Herring Gull, which carried these plates until it was withdrawn from service as British Railways No. 60006 on 3 September 1965 and scrapped on 31 October.

A plaque was placed on the spot where No. 4469 Sir Ralph Wedgwood was destroyed in April 1942, now within the Great Hall of the National Railway Museum, by the Gresley Preservation Society on 29 April 1992 to mark the 50th anniversary of the raid.
