= LNER Class A4 60034 Lord Faringdon =

Scrapped British steam locomotive

Lord Faringdon
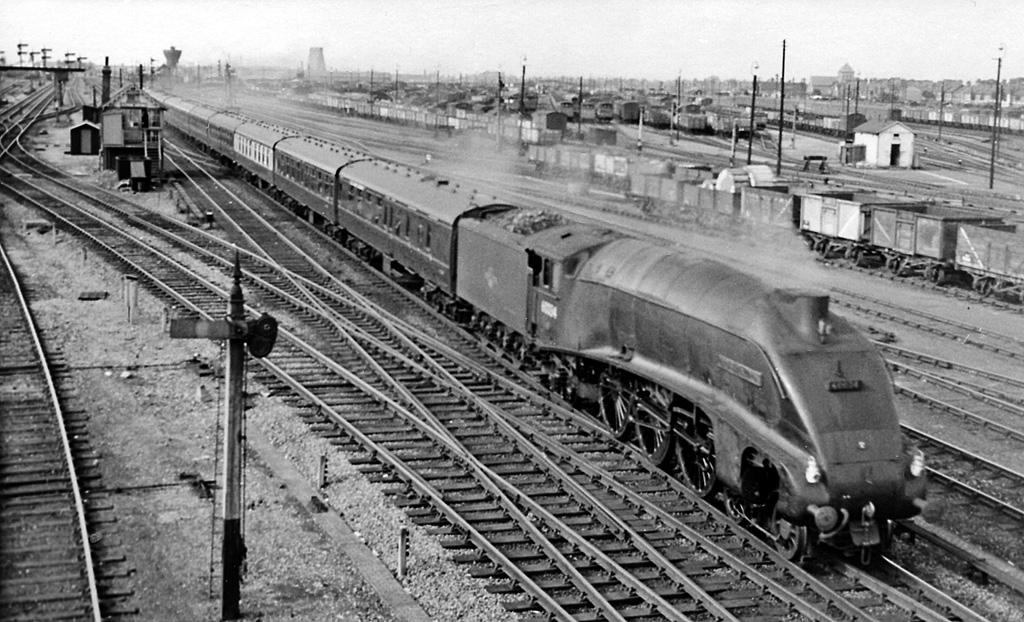
- 'Lord Faringdon' pulling a train at Peterborough railway station in 1959.
Type and origin
- Power type: Steam
- Designer: Sir Nigel Gresley
- Builder: LNER Doncaster Works
- Serial number: 1870
- Build date: 3 March 1938
Specifications
- Configuration
  - Whyte: 4-6-2
  - UIC: 2'C1'h3
- Gauge: 4 ft 8 1/2 in (1,435 mm)
- Leading dia.: 3 ft 2 in (0.965 m)
- Driver dia.: 6 ft 8 in (2.032 m)
- Trailing dia.: 3 ft 8 in (1.118 m)
- Length: 70 ft (21.34 m)
- Loco weight: 102.95 long tons (104.6 t)
- Total weight: 167.1 long tons (169.8 t)
- Boiler pressure: 250 psi (1.72 MPa)
- Cylinders: Three
- Cylinder size: 18.5 in × 26 in (470 mm × 660 mm)
- Loco brake: Steam
- Train brakes: Vacuum
Performance figures
- Tractive effort: 35,455 lbf (157.7 kN)
Career
- Operators: LNER, BR
- Class: A4
- Withdrawn: 24 August 1966
- Disposition: Scrapped

LNER Class A4 60034 Lord Faringdon (or formerly 4903 Peregrine as it was before being renumbered under British Railways) was one of 35 Doncaster built Class A4 Gresley Pacific steam locomotives.

It entered service on 1 July 1938 and was withdrawn on 24 August 1966.

== History ==
Lord Faringdon was one of a small number of A4 Pacifics built with a double chimney and double Kylchap blastpipe. The first locomotive to have this was 4468 "Mallard".

Lord Faringdon was based at Kings Cross and ran on the London-Edinburgh line.

When British Railways were nationalised and the LNER A4s were renumbered, Lord Faringdon and two other locomotives Mallard and 60033 Seagull were used for the 1948 Locomotive Exchange Trials. Lord Faringdon was used on the ex-LMS main line from Euston to Preston and Carlisle route.

Lord Faringdon was withdrawn from Aberdeen Shed on 24 August 1966. It was scrapped at Hughes Bolckow in early 1967.

== Technical specifications ==
Peregrine, Doncaster Works number 1877, was fitted with a Kylchap double blastpipe as from new, never having a single chimney. In its service life it wore a variety of liveries with different numbering schemes: Garter Blue as 4903 Peregrine from its introduction, wartime black marked on tender as "NE" from 14 September 1942, it was renumbered as 34 in November 1946, garter blue with no valances as of 10 December 1947, renumbered as 60034 on 24 March 1948, renamed Lord Faringdon on 24 March 1948, painted British Railways dark blue on 4 December 1950 and finally British Railways Brunswick green on 7 August 1952. Advanced Warning System (AWS) was fitted on 11 November 1952 and a Smith-Stone speed recorder was fitted on 2 November 1960. Around 1966, Lord Faringdon gained a red background to its nameplates.

As with all 35 of the Gresley A4 pacific steam locomotives, Lord Faringdon was fitted with streamlined valances, or side skirting, when it was built. This was removed to ease maintenance in wartime, as it was on other locomotives. 4903 lost its valances during a wartime works visit.

Lord Faringdon was fitted with twelve boilers during its twenty-eight year career. These boilers were: 9031 (from construction), 8951 (from 4488 Union of South Africa, 27 December 1940), 9024 (from 4468 Mallard, 14 September 1942), 8960 (from 29 Woodcock, 10 December 1947 - renumbered 29280 4 December 1950), 29283 (from 60016 Silver King, 7 August 1952), 29270 (from 60017 Silver Fox, 13 January 1954), 29295 (from 60017 Silver Fox, 21 May 1955), 29300 (from 60027 Merlin, 10 November 1956), 29311 (from 60018 Sparrow Hawk, 29 January 1958), 29333 (new-build, 14 May 1959), 29327 (from 60026 Miles Beevor, 2 November 1960) and 27964 (from 60008 Dwight D Eisenhower, 1 June 1962).

Lord Faringdon was fitted with six tenders during its career: 5639 (1 July 1938 – 22 April 1939), 5642 (9 June 1939 – 24 January 1948), 5332 (25 February 1948 – 28 May 1954), 5325 (28 May 1954 - 14 January 1963), 5640 (28 January 1963 – 24 August 1966) and 5329 (24 August 1966 – 3 December 1966 - fitted for scrappage).

Lord Faringdon/Peregrine was allocated to seven depots during its career: Doncaster from new, Kings Cross Top Shed from 25 July 1942, Grantham from 5 October 1942, Kings Cross Top Shed 11 April 1948, New England 16 June 1963, St Margarets 20 October 1963 and finally Aberdeen from 17 May 1964.
