= Monster Moves =

British documentary television series

- Also known as: Mega Moves; Huge Moves; Impossible Moves
- Genre: Documentary
- Theme music composer: Daniel Pemberton
- Country of origin: United Kingdom
- Original language: English
- No. of seasons: 6
- No. of episodes: 31 (list of episodes)

Production
- Running time: 1 hour (inc. commercials)
- Production company: Windfall Films

Original release
- Release: 25 July 2005 – 6 January 2014

Related
- Big, Bigger, Biggest

Monster Moves is a British documentary television series which began airing in 2005. A total 31 episodes have been produced across 6 seasons so far.

== Format ==
Each episode follows the high risk jobs of moving teams on their journeys to relocate houses, ships, trains and even whole towns across land and sea. Before the starting credits a short summary of the task to be accomplished is shown. Following these credits, the move team leader is introduced and they explain the various possibilities for moving the structure. Computer generated imagery showcases the possibility of things to go wrong with each of the possible scenarios. The rest of the episode follows the move team as they move the structure by their chosen method of transportation. Each episode also includes a song with original lyrics describing the move(s) being followed.

== Episodes ==
=== Summary ===
Series	Episodes	Originally released	
Series	Episodes	First released	Last released
1	3	25 July 2005	8 August 2005
2	4	2006	2007
3	6	4 March 2008	7 May 2008
4	6	23 June 2009	28 July 2009
5	6	5 April 2011	11 May 2011
6	6	29 August 2013	6 January 2014

=== Season 1 (2005) ===
No.	Title	Original release date	Australian air date
1	"Mammoth Mansions"	25 July 2005	14 August 2010
A Victorian villa is moved 220 kilometres (140 mi) in Canada to Vancouver Island.
2	"Tall Towers"	1 August 2005	7 August 2010
A new air traffic control tower is moved into position at Heathrow Airport after being constructed off-site. Five 43-metre (141 ft) grain elevators are also moved over an icy and snowy landscape in Manitoba, Canada.
3	"Long Loads"	8 August 2005	21 August 2010
Two of America's longest trains are moved to the top of a hill and a railway station is moved 2 miles (3.2 km) in two pieces.

=== Season 2 (2006–2007) ===
No.	Title	Original release date	Australian air date
1	"Historic Homes"	Unknown	5 June 2010
Two large historic houses are transported to new locations in one piece.
2	"Colossal Churches"	2006	22 May 2010
A church with a steeple 100 feet (30 m) tall is moved in one piece while a second church is dismantled before its relocation.
3	"Massive Machines"	2006	12 June 2010
After a five-month redevelopment, the London Underground requires the return of their trains on the Waterloo & City line. A plane at the bottom of a lake for 75 years in Canada needs returning to the surface.
4	"Total Towns"	2007	19 June 2010
The world's first ever house factory produced entire streets while several luxury mansions are moved to their new location at a marina village.

=== Season 3 (2008) ===
No.	Title	Original release date	Australian air date
1	"Rescuing Ramesses"	4 March 2008	6 March 2010
A recreation of part of the massive move required to relocate the Abu Simbel temples which were originally moved over 40 years ago.
2	"Risky Rescues"	11 March 2008	30 January 2010
A 150-foot (46 m) lighthouse needs to be moved from a crumbling cliff-top and 17 homes need to be moved before the earth swallows the buildings up.
3	"Long Locomotive"	18 March 2008	20 February 2010
A 7,000 miles (11,000 km) journey is required to move a 100-tonne (98-long-ton; 110-short-ton) steam locomotive from Bloemfontein, South Africa to Glasgow, Scotland.
4	"Wooden Wonders"	16 April 2008	6 February 2010
An 8,000-square-foot (740 m^{2}) tavern is moved over a mountain and a large barn is moved across the countryside.
5	"Historic Hulks"	30 April 2008	13 February 2010
A 700-tonne (690-long-ton; 770-short-ton) hall is moved through the middle of a city and a Lockheed Lodestar plane is moved 40 miles (64 km).
6	"Huge Homes"	7 May 2008	27 February 2010
A house is moved intact across a mountain range and a frozen lake to its new destination.

=== Season 4 (2009) ===
No.	Title	Original release date	Australian air date
1	"Supersize Submarine"	23 June 2009	26 June 2010
The 1,400-tonne (1,400-long-ton; 1,500-short-ton) HMCS Onondaga is moved across over 1,100 kilometres (680 mi) of land and sea to reach its new destination.
2	"Titanic Towns"	30 June 2009	3 July 2010
170 homes in Malartic, Quebec, Canada, are relocated after it was discovered they were sitting on top of Can$8 billion worth of gold. Also, 100-year-old, 200-tonne (200-long-ton; 220-short-ton) mansions are moved to prevent them from being demolished.
3	"Millionaire's Mega Yachts"	7 July 2009	10 July 2010
22 yachts are transported across the Atlantic Ocean in the Yacht Express.
4	"Million-Dollar Mansions"	14 July 2009	17 July 2010
Two expensive mansions are relocated up to 800 kilometres (500 mi) away from their original locations.
5	"Colossal Courthouse"	21 July 2009	24 July 2010
A 1,200-tonne (1,200-long-ton; 1,300-short-ton) church is relocated to a new site 90 metres (300 ft) away where it will become a courthouse.
6	"Supersize Steamship"	28 July 2009	31 July 2010
The SS President is moved across land and sea requiring disassembly for part of the journey.

=== Season 5 (2011) ===
No.	Title	Original release date	Australian air date
1	"Ship Sink"	5 April 2011	21 May 2011
The decommissioned USS Kittiwake is moved from the Norfolk, Virginia to Grand Cayman and sunk as an artificial reef.
2	"Spectacular Spitfire"	12 April 2011	7 May 2011
A restored RAF Spitfire must be carefully dismantled for transport from Britain to the United States for a collector.
3	"Titanic Trains"	19 April 2011	28 May 2011
2 TCDD 45151 Class (LMS 8F Class) locomotive's numbers 45166 & 45170, need moving 850 miles across Turkey, before being shipped back to the UK. Unable to run under their own steam, the locomotives need to be moved over torturous terrain by rail from Sivas to the port of Izmir.
4	"Mammoth Machines"	26 April 2011	4 June 2011
Two teams of movers race against the clock to relocate a submarine-attack aircraft from Canada to the US inside the world's biggest cargo plane and a huge snowplough locomotive up a mountain.
5	"Ocean Odyssey"	3 May 2011	11 June 2011
A collection of high-spec racing yachts that have competed in the gruelling Route du Rhum race have to be transported from the Caribbean to France – without their hulls getting wet or damaged.
6	"Mountain Mission"	10 May 2011	18 June 2011
A team of engineers race against the clock to move a colossal telescope, weighing over 100 tons, up to a height of 5000-metres on a mountain plateaux in Chile.

=== Season 6 (2013) ===
No.	Title	Original release date	Australian air date
1	"Titanic Train Trek"	29 August 2013	11 January 2014
2 LNER A4 Pacific's numbers 60008 Dwight D. Eisenhower & 60010 Dominion of Canada need moving from their museums in Canada and America to the National Railway Museum in York to take part in the 75th Anniversary celebrations of sister engine Mallard's speed record of 126mph which was set back in 1938.
2	"Big Bomber"	20 September 2013	18 January 2014
A team of British engineers attempts to move a historic Canberra jet bomber over 400 km (250 miles) from Coventry to Newquay, Cornwall, for a private collector. The vintage aircraft is in no condition to fly and consequently must travel by truck. Too large to be moved in one piece, the Canberra must be dismantled and reassembled at its destination.
3	"Gigantic Gun"	27 September 2013	25 January 2014
An expert team of heavy haulers attempts to transport a massive First World War 18-inch railway gun 400 miles from the Royal Artillery in Wiltshire to the Railway Museum in Utrecht, Holland.
4	"Huge Helicopter"	4 October 2013	1 February 2014
Two new Sikorsky S-92 helicopters, the ultimate search and rescue machines, have been ordered for a search and rescue team in Scotland. Each aircraft costs £20 million and is built at the Sikorsky factory in Coatesville, Pennsylvania. But, now they need delivering: it is more than 3,300 miles from Coatesville to Sumburgh in the Shetland Islands.
5	"Floating Town"	6 December 2013	8 February 2014
Wim Jelsma and Carin Koning want to build and move their dream home - one of seven floating mansions that will become a new waterborne community in the Netherlands.
6	"Huge Hovercraft"	6 January 2014	15 February 2014
A team of engineers attempt to haul a brand new, massive search-and-rescue hovercraft 5,000 miles from Southampton to Vancouver in Canada.

== See also ==
- Big, Bigger, Biggest
- Extreme Engineering
- Mega Movers
- MegaStructures
- Modern Marvels
