= Y8 =

Y8 may refer to:

- Shaanxi Y-8, a Chinese transport aircraft
  - KJ-200, also known by the NATO reporting name "Moth" or "Y-8 Balance Beam", a Chinese airborne early warning and control aircraft.
- LNER Class Y8, a class of British steam locomotives
- Yangtze River Express, an IATA airline designator
- Youth 8 summit, more commonly known as the Y8 summit, the youth counterpart to the G8 summit

== See also ==
- 8Y (disambiguation)
