= 8Y =

Y8 or 8-Y may refer to:

- 8 years
- 8Y, the IATA airline code for the Burundian company Air Burundi
- South African Class 8Y 2-8-0 locomotive
- 8Y, list of Alboran Sea; see List of NATO country codes
- A brand name of factor VIII (medication)

== See also ==
- Y8 (disambiguation)
