= Andrew K. McCosh =

Andrew Kirkwood McCosh, J.P., D.L. (31 August 1880 – 27 September 1967) was an administrator in the coal and steel industries, born in Ayrshire, Scotland.

== Education ==
McCosh was educated at Fettes and Trinity College, Cambridge. He was awarded a B.A., Mechanical Science Tripos, in 1902.

== Career ==
He was the Chairman of the Scottish Iron Masters' Association from 1917–1939, the Lanarkshire Coal Masters' Association from 1934–1937, and the Scottish Colliery Owners in 1939. He was the President of the British Iron and Steel Federation in 1936–37. He was Deputy Controller, Raw Materials, Iron and Steel Control, at the Ministry of Supply from 1939–42. He was the President of the Mining Association of Great Britain from 1944–45 and a Governor of the Scottish Mining Disasters Relief Fund. He was the President of the British Employers' Confederation from 1945–46. He was Chairman of William Baird & Co. Ltd. and Bairds & Scottish Steel Ltd. He was the Director of Bairds & Dalmellington Ltd. and Provident Mutual Life Association. He was Deputy Lieutenant for Lanarkshire.

== Authorship of Government Documentation ==
He was one of the authors of the report by the Committee on Co-operative Selling in the Coal Mining Industry, which was a secret memorandum by the President of the Board of Trade.

== Steam Locomotive ==
The steam locomotive 4-6-2 A4 class BR 60003, originally named 'Osprey,' was renamed 'Andrew K. McCosh' after him in October 1942. He was Chairman of the LNER Locomotive Committee, coming to the LNER Board from that of the NBR. The locomotive was built in 1938 and based at King's Cross; it was withdrawn in 1962.

== Portrait ==
George Henry painted a portrait of McCosh in 1912. It is in the collection of North Lanarkshire Council Museums and Heritage Service.
