= LNER Class A4 4902 Seagull =

Scrapped British steam locomotive

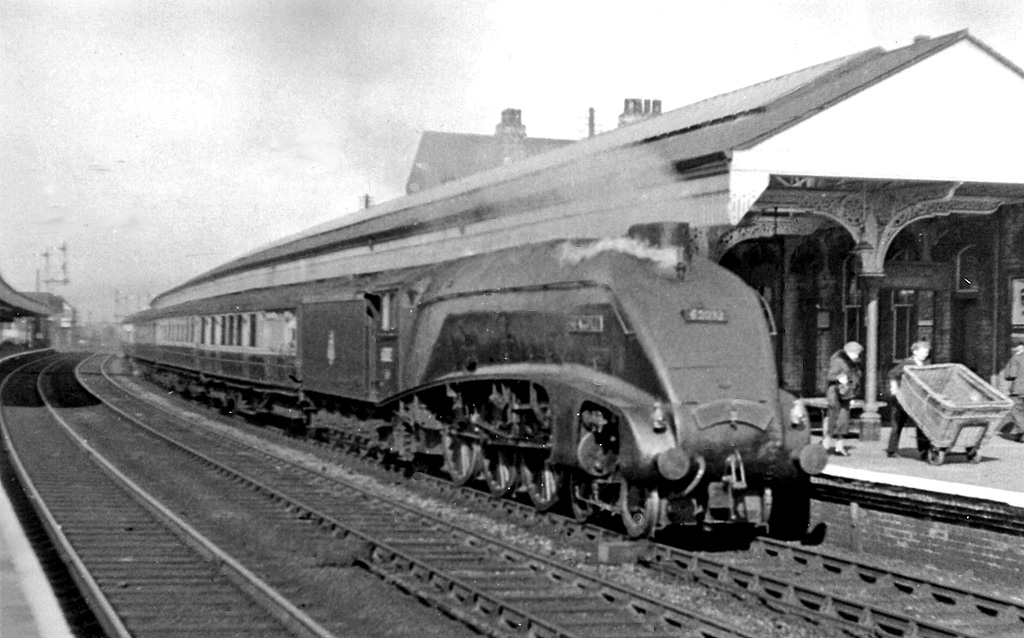
- Seagull at Retford Station on October 7th 1954.
Type and origin
- Power type: Steam
- Builder: LNER, Doncaster Works
Specifications
- Configuration
  - Whyte: 4-6-2
  - UIC: 2'C1h3
- Gauge: 4 ft 8+1/2 in (1,435 mm) standard gauge
Career
- Operators: LNER, British Rail
- Number in class: 34 of 35
- Official name: Seagull
- First run: 28 June 1938
- Withdrawn: 29 December 1962
- Disposition: Scrapped at Doncaster Works in 1963.

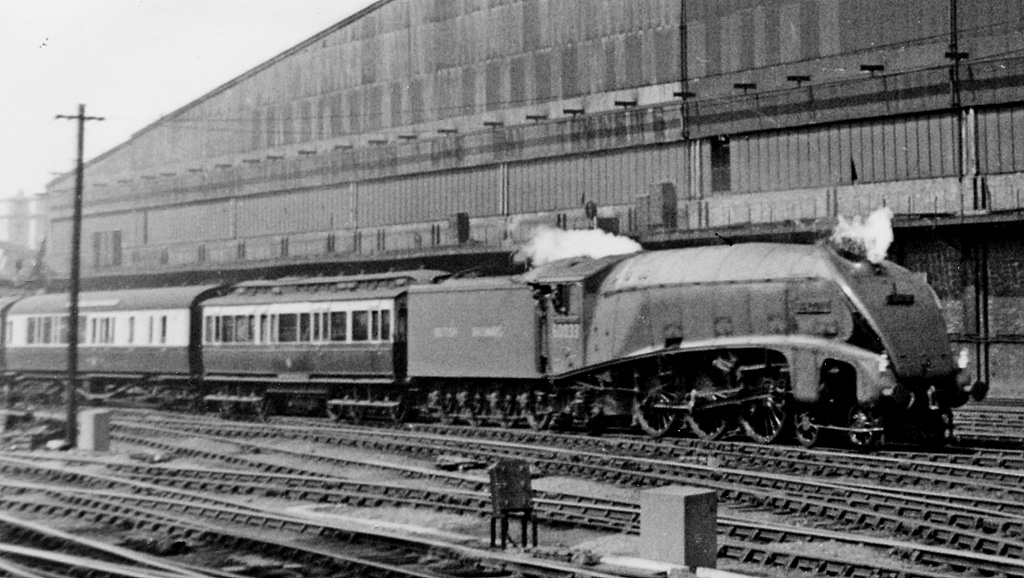
Gresley A4 Pacific No.60033 Seagull approaching London Paddington during participation in the 1948 Locomotive Exchange Trials, here unusually pulling a dynamometer-car behind Seagull's tender.

LNER Class A4 4902 Seagull (or 60033 Seagull, as it was renumbered under British Railways) was one of 35 Doncaster built LNER Class A4 Gresley Pacific steam locomotives.

It entered service on 28 June 1938 and was withdrawn on 29 December 1962.

== History ==
Like her famous sister Mallard, Seagull was one of only four of the A4 Pacifics initially built with a double chimney and double Kylchap blastpipe, the rest of the class acquiring it in the late 1950s.

4902 Seagull was based at Kings Cross and ran on the London-Edinburgh line.

When British Railways were nationalised and the LNER A4s were renumbered, 60033 Seagull and two of her sisters E22 Mallard and 60034 Lord Faringdon were used for the 1948 Locomotive Exchange Trials. Seagull was used on the ex-GWR main line between London and Devonshire. Though Seagull didn't perform as well as the GWR locomotives which had been designed for that stretch, she performed better than Mallard and better than the SR and LMS competition.

60033 Seagull was withdrawn from Kings Cross Top Shed on 29 December 1962. She was broken up for scrap at Doncaster Works on 23 January 1963.

== Liveries, boilers and tenders ==
Seagull, Doncaster Works number 1876, was fitted with a Kylchap double blastpipe as from new, never having a single chimney. In her service life she wore a variety of liveries with different numbering schemes: Garter Blue as 4902 from her introduction, LNER black as of 27 May 1942, wartime black marked on tender as "NE" from 24 September 1943, renumbered as E33 on 31 October 1946, garter blue with no valances as of 5 December 1947, renumbered as 60033 on 10 April 1948, British Railways dark blue on 10 November 1950 and finally British Railways Brunswick green on 13 June 1952. Advanced Warning System (AWS) was fitted on 25 February 1953 and a Smith-Stone speed recorder was fitted on 8 June 1961.

All of the class were fitted with streamlined valances, or side skirting, from new, but these were removed during the war to ease maintenance. 4902 lost her valances during a works visit on 27 May 1942.

Seagull was fitted with eleven boilers during her twenty-four year career. These boilers were: 9030 (from construction), 8947 (from 4484 Falcon, 24 September 1943), 8949 (from 60018 Sparrow Hawk, 6 May 1949), 29278 (from 60025 Falcon, 10 November 1950), 29313 (new-build, 13 June 1952), 29296 (from 60006 Sir Ralph Wedgwood, 3 December 1953), 29301 (from 60022 Mallard, 14 May 1955), 29290 (from 60029 Woodcock, 13 June 1956), 29301 (from 60027 Merlin, 5 March 1958), 29302 (from 60004 William Whitelaw, 4 July 1959) and 27967 (new-build, 8 June 1961).

Seagull was fitted with three tenders during her career: 5636 (28 June 1938 – 30 March 1948), 5325 (9 April 1948 – 28 May 1954) and 5332 (28 May 1954 – 29 December 1962).

Seagull was allocated to only two depots during her career: Kings Cross Top Shed from new, Grantham from 23 April 1944 and Top Shed again from 21 March 1948.
