= Beevor's sign =

- Differential diagnosis: spinal cord injury

Beevor's sign is a medical sign in which the navel moves towards the head upon flexing the neck, indicating selective weakness of the lower abdominal muscles. Causes include spinal cord injury, amyotrophic lateral sclerosis (ALS), and facioscapulohumeral muscular dystrophy (FSHD).

== Etymology ==
The sign is named after Charles Edward Beevor, an English neurologist (1854–1908) who first described it.

== Pathophysiology ==
Beevor's sign occurs when the upper part of the rectus abdominis muscle is intact, but the lower part is weak. When the patient is asked to raise his head while lying supine on the bed, the upper part of the muscle contracts disproportionately more than the lower portion, pulling the umbilicus toward the head.

== Clinical significance ==
Beevor's sign is characteristic of spinal cord injury between T9 and T10 levels. The sign has also been observed in amyotrophic lateral sclerosis, a disease that causes progressive weakening of muscles across multiple areas of the body, and in facioscapulohumeral muscular dystrophy (FSHD), a disease named after the areas of the body it preferentially weakens (face, shoulders, and upper arm). FSHD tends to affect the lower rectus abdominis more than the upper.

It has also been described in inclusion body myositis.
