= Beevor's axiom =

Idea about how the brain directs movement

Beevor's axiom is the idea that the brain does not know muscles, only movements. In other words, the brain registers the movements that muscles combine to make, not the individual muscles that are making the movements. Hence, this is why one can sign their name (albeit poorly) with their foot. Beevor's axiom was coined by Dr. Charles Edward Beevor, an English neurologist.

Dr. Beevor presented Beevor's axiom in a series of four lectures from June 3, 1903 to July 4, 1903 before the Royal College of Physicians of London as part of the Croonian Lectures. His experiments showed that when an area of the cortex was stimulated, the body responded with a movement, not just a single muscle. Dr. Beevor concluded that “only co-ordinated movements are represented in the excitable cortex”

In relation to Beevor's axiom, it has been found that the brain encodes sequences, such as playing the piano, signing our name, wiping off a counter, and chopping vegetables, and once encoded and practiced, it takes less brain activity to perform them. This supports Beevor's axiom, because the brain can recall movements easier than it can learn them.

Beevor's axiom is only partially true, however. Most behavior of muscles is encoded in the primary motor cortex (M1) and separated by muscle group. In an effort to understand the encoding in the M1, researchers observed commands of monkeys. Muscle cells changed firing rate according to the direction of the arm movements. Each neuron has one direction that elicits the greatest response. Some M1 neurons encode muscle contractions, while others react to particular movements, regardless of the muscles used to perform them. The key characteristic of the primary motor cortex is its dynamic nature; the M1 changes based on experience. The supplementary motor area (SMA) plays a key role in initiating motion sequences. The premotor cortex (PMA) plays a key role when motor sequences are guided by external events. They map behaviors as opposed to the M1 which maps specific movements. This could cause in issue in brain–computer interface research. If a researcher tries to excite only a muscle, it might be impossible without expecting a full movement.
