= Charles Edward Beevor =

English neurologist and anatomist

Charles Edward Beevor (12 June 1854 – 5 December 1908) was an English neurologist and anatomist who described Beevor's sign, the Jaw jerk reflex, and the area of the brain supplied by the anterior choroidal artery. He also coined Beevor's axiom that "the brain does not know muscles, only movements."

== Biography ==
He was born in London to Charles Beevor, FRCS and Elizabeth (née Burrell) and educated at Blackheath Proprietary School and University College London. He trained in medicine at University College Hospital and the University of London, graduating MB in 1879 and MD in 1881. He took the post of Resident Medical Officer at the National Hospital for the Paralysed and Epileptic, becoming Assistant Physician and then full Physician. He was also Physician for many years to the Great Northern Central Hospital.

In 1907, he became president of the Neurological Society. He was elected a Fellow of the Royal College of Physicians in 1888 and delivered their Croonian Lecture in 1903 On Muscular Movements and their Representation in the Central Nervous System.

== Publication ==
He published the Handbook on Diseases of the Nervous System in 1898.
