= Beauvois =

Beauvois may refer to:

Places

- Beauvois, Pas-de-Calais, France
- Beauvois-en-Cambrésis, Nord, France
- Beauvois-en-Vermandois, Aisne, France

People

- Ambroise Marie François Joseph Palisot de Beauvois, French naturalist
- Xavier Beauvois, French actor and film director
