= John Beevor =

English cricketer

John Grosvenor Beevor (1 January 1845 – 5 May 1903) was an English first-class cricketer active 1868–1871 who played for Nottinghamshire. He was born and died in Barnby Moor.

The son of Henry Beevor of Retford, he was educated at Uppingham School from 1857 to 1862. He then had a career as a solicitor.

== Family ==
Beevor was the father of Henry Beevor, a solicitor; who was father of John Grosvenor Beevor (1905–1987), known as an SOE agent of World War II. The younger John Grosvenor Beevor was the father of the author Antony Beevor.
