= NER Class K =

Class of British steam locomotives

NER Class K LNER Class Y8
Type and origin
- Power type: Steam
- Designer: T. W. Worsdell
- Builder: Gateshead Works
- Build date: 1890
- Total produced: 5
Specifications
- Configuration
  - Whyte: 0-4-0T
- Gauge: 4 ft 8 1/2 in (1,435 mm) standard gauge
- Driver dia.: 3 ft 0 in (0.914 m)
- Wheelbase: 6 ft 0 in (1.8 m)
- Length: 17 ft 10.5 in (5.4 m)
- Width: 7 ft 0 in (2.1 m)
- Height: 11 ft 0 in (3.4 m)
- Loco weight: 15.5 long tons (15.7 t)
- Fuel type: Coal
- Fuel capacity: 4 long cwt (450 lb; 200 kg)
- Water cap.: 250 imp gal (1,100 L; 300 US gal)
- Boiler pressure: 140 psi (0.97 MPa)
- Heating surface
  - Firebox: 44.5 sq ft (4.13 m^{2})
  - Tubes: 344.7 sq ft (32.02 m^{2})
- Cylinders: two inside
- Cylinder size: 11 in × 15 in (280 mm × 380 mm)
Performance figures
- Tractive effort: 6,000 lbf (26.69 kN)
Career
- Retired: 1936-1956
- Disposition: All 5 original locomotives scrapped. One replica being constructed

The North Eastern Railway (NER) Class K classified as Class Y8 by the London and North Eastern Railway (LNER) is a class of 0-4-0T steam locomotives designed to work at Hull Docks. It was designed by Thomas W. Worsdell and five of these tiny engines were built in 1890. These were numbered 559–63.

== Description ==
The Class K design was not just small, it was diminutive, and as Class Y8 these were the smallest steam locomotives used by the LNER. They were fitted with steam and hand brakes only, never having vacuum brakes, and were unusual in having no bunker behind the cab for the coal, but rather having the small amount of coal required stored in a bin at the back of the footplate.

The Y8s were built with 'marine' type boilers, i.e. with a cylindrical furnace into which the grate fitted. Between 1902 and 1904, they were all re-boilered with more traditional boilers similar to those fitted to the NER Class H locomotives.

Originally all of the Y8s were fitted with a single whistle of the bell-shaped type. 560, 561, and 563 acquired the organ type during LNER ownership. 559 also had one of these whistles fitted, but after 1940. In 1942 LNER No. 8091 (NER No. 560) acquired the chime whistle from the LNER Class A4 4469 Sir Ralph Wedgewood when it was damaged during an air raid on York in 1942. By 1946, the original organ-pipe whistle had been restored.

== Operation ==
The NER built the K class specifically to shunt the docks at Hull, and it was here that they performed for most of their lives. During World War I No.559 was used both at Woolwich Arsenal and by the Royal Engineers near the mouth of the Humber Estuary. In 1940-41 559 spent a second period on the Spurn Head Railway. No 8091 became Departmental Locomotive No. 55, and acquired a 50A shed plate, being the last of the class when finally withdrawn in June 1954.

All five K class locos survived into LNER ownership. However, the Depression-era reduction in dock traffic and the increased use of Sentinel shunters (LNER Class Y1 and LNER Class Y3) led to the scrapping of three Y8s in 1936/7. Numbers 559 and 560 survived to the 1946 renumbering, and were renumbered as 8090 and 8091 respectively. Both survived into British Railways (BR) ownership, but neither survived long enough to acquire an updated '60000' number plate. 8090 was withdrawn in November 1948.

== New Build ==
None of the original five survived into preservation. After years of speculation, in 2022 the Beamish Museum announced plans to build a new K Class engine where its small size and marine type boiler are seen as perfect for the museum's short demonstration line.

== Bibliography ==
- Ian Allan ABC of British Railways Locomotives, part 4 (1948 ed.). p. 46.
