= Beavon =

Beavon is a surname. Notable people with the surname include:

- Cyril Beavon (1937–2017), English footballer
- Kate Beavon (born 2000), South African swimmer
- Stuart Beavon (born 1958), English footballer
- Stuart Beavon (born 1984), English footballer
