= Miles Beevor =

English businessman

Miles Beevor (8 March 1900 in Hendon, London – 9 September 1994 in Wolverhampton) was a solicitor, pilot and businessman.

The son of Rowland Beevor and Margaret Frances Evans, Beevor was educated at Winchester College, and graduated from New College, Oxford University in 1921 with a Bachelor of Arts. He qualified a solicitor in 1925, and latterly held the office of Justice of the Peace for Hertfordshire.

At the outbreak of World War II, he joined the Royal Air Force Volunteer Reserve and gained the rank of flight lieutenant in 1941. He became chief legal advisor for London and North Eastern Railway in 1943, a post he held until the LNER was nationalised. In light of his service, on 1 November 1947 the LNER named an LNER A4 Pacific after him Just before nationalisation, Beevor was acting chief general manager for LNER in June 1947, after which he became Chief Secretary and legal advisor for the British Transport Commission between 1947 and 1951.

Beevor was Managing Director of Brush Group Ltd between 1954 and 1958, as the company pushed into producing diesel locomotives for the newly founded British Railways, to replace their steam fleet.

Beevor died on 9 September 1994 at the age of 94.

== Personal life ==
Beevor married Margaret Florence Platt, daughter of Algernon John Frederick Platt, on 17 September 1924. The couple had two children, Susan (born 1927, died 1948) and John (born 1930, died 2001). After Margaret's death on 15 February 1934 he married Sybil Gilliat, daughter of Lt.-Col. John Babington Gilliat (and sister of Lt Col Sir Martin Gilliat), on 23 April 1935. The couple had three children, Antony (born 1940), Helen (born 1943) and Ronald (born 1947).
