= Kings Cross Top Shed =

Steam locomotive maintenance and stabling depot

Coordinates: 51.5377°N 0.1281°W

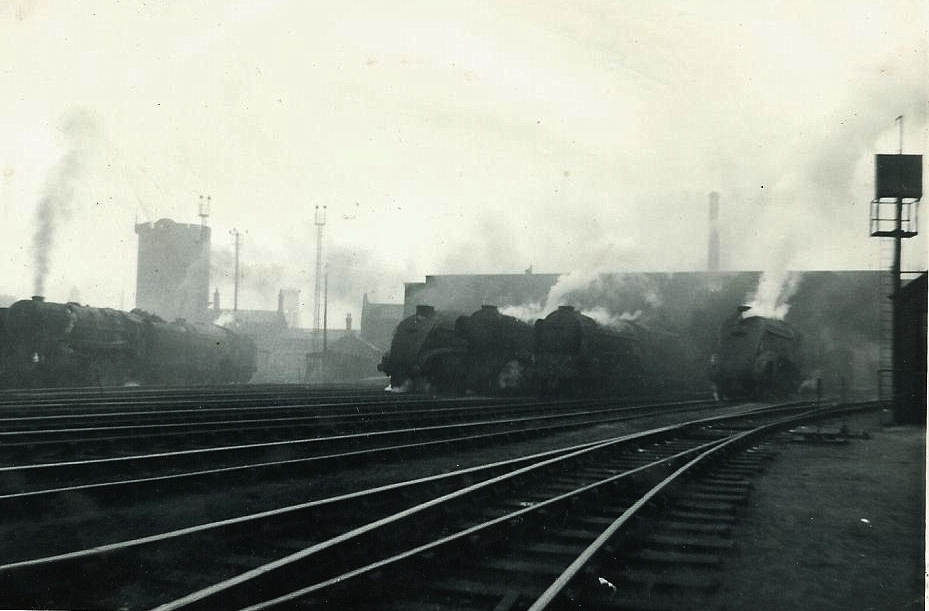
Locomotives outside the Running Shed in 1963

Kings Cross Top Shed was a large steam locomotive maintenance and stabling depot just north of King's Cross railway station on the far side of Regent's Canal.

== History ==
The first Great Northern Railway engine shed at London was built in 1850, three quarters of a mile north-west of where Kings Cross station is located today. It was built on a large area of open land, with the East and West India Docks and Birmingham Junction Railway to the north, the main line of the Great Northern Railway to the east and Regent's Canal to the south. The East and West India Docks and Birmingham Junction Railway which ran from Chalk Farm to Poplar was still being built in 1850, and by 1853 it was known by the simpler title of The North London Railway. Most of the land in the area around Top Shed was developed into Kings Cross Goods Yard.

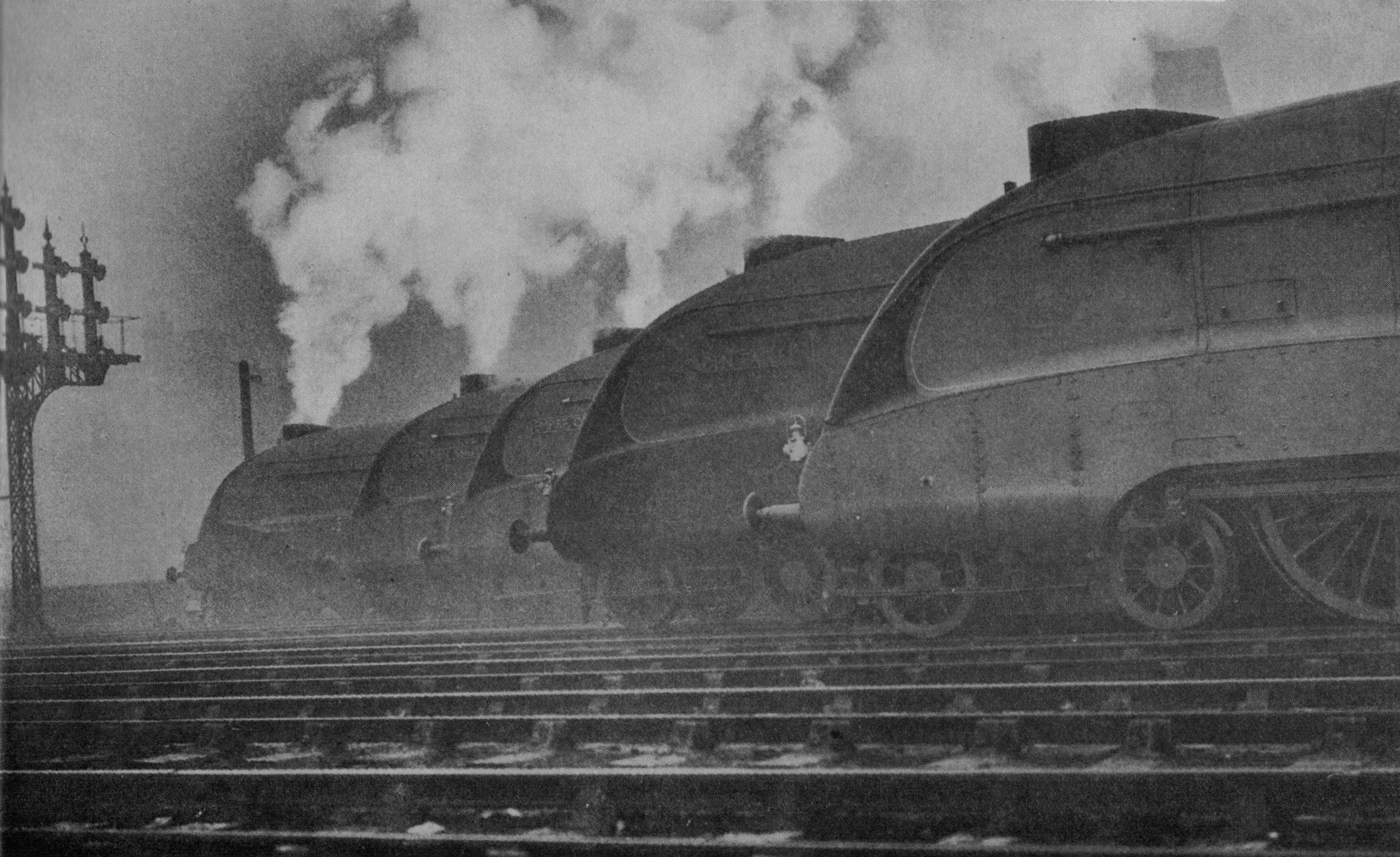
four A4 locomotives, and the similar looking rebuilt W1 in London, 1937

A temporary passenger terminus had been sited at Maiden Lane (now called York Way) from August 1850 and the locomotive depot was constructed nearby. However, when Kings Cross station was opened in October 1852 it was located further south, on the other side of Regent's Canal and at a lower level than the Top Shed to allow for the lines running underneath the canal.

The Top Shed finally closed in June 1963, and demolition began soon after.

Nearby was Kings Cross Goods Yard.

== Buildings ==
=== The Running Shed ===
Originally constructed in 1850, the Main Shed had twenty five roads. Although there was no turntable in front of the main running shed, it was built in the shape of a shallow curve which gave the shed a unique appearance.

=== The Midland Roundhouse ===
In December 1857 the Midland Railway negotiated with the Great Northern Railway for running powers over the main line from Hitchin to King's Cross. As part of this agreement the GNR undertook to provide engine sheds at its own cost for the MR, with the Midland paying for its water use, plus six per cent interest for the rent of the premises. The Roundhouse (also known as the Derby Shed) opened in 1859 and grew to be a considerable size, with eventually twenty four roads circling the forty foot diameter turntable.

But by 1861 the Midland had decided that they wanted their own Goods and Minerals Station, which they subsequently built at Agar Town. When they left the Great Northern took the Roundhouse over as a carriage and wagon shop, and then as a running shed for their tank locos. In 1931 it was demolished and the tracks were then used for open air stabling until the Met Shed was built.

=== The Met Shed ===
The Met (Metropolitan) Shed was put together in 1932 following the demolition of the Roundhouse. The front half was part of the original 1850 running shed whilst the rear was formed by the 1862 extension to the carriage and wagon shops. It housed the tank engines and locomotives which worked the inner and outer suburban services from Kings Cross.

=== Access ===
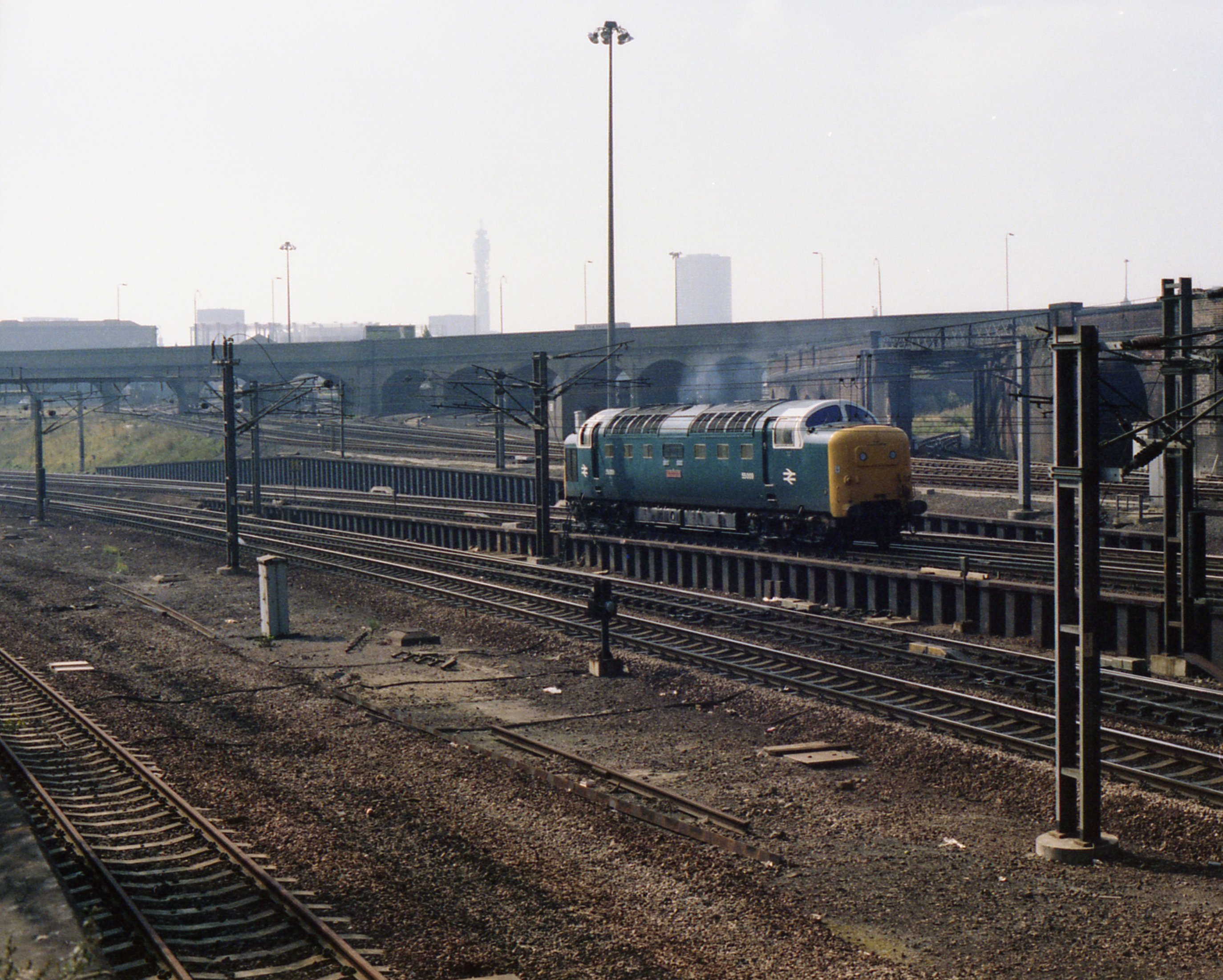
A Deltic at Belle Isle in the 1970s. Lines through the multiple arched bridge behind led to Top Shed and Kings Cross Goods yard

Most of the sidings at the Top Shed and Kings Cross Goods Yard funneled down into the junction at Freight Terminal junction near Belle Isle, which was the cause of the fan-shaped layout of both areas.
