= LNER Class A4 =

British steam locomotive class (built 1935)

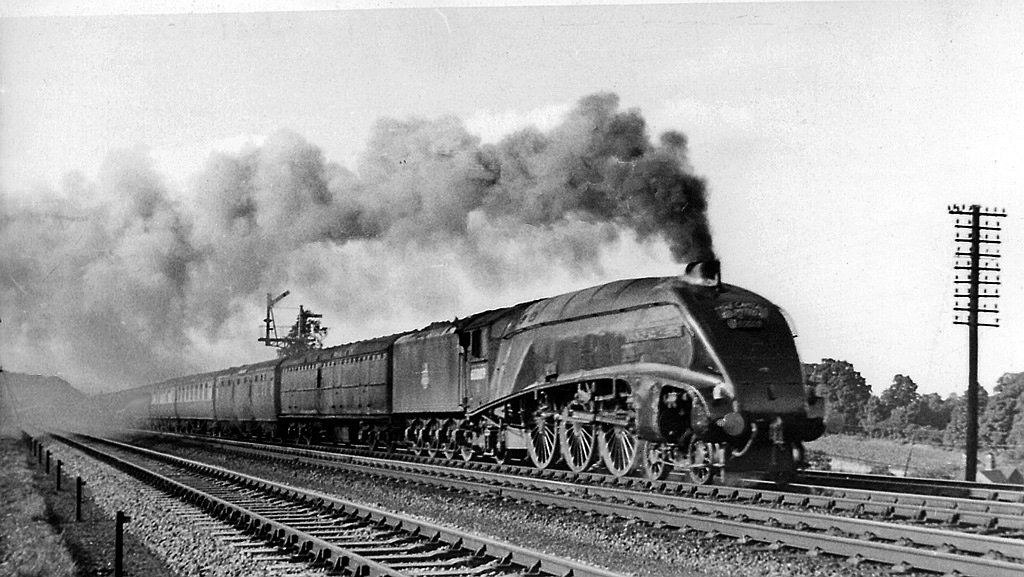
- 60009 Union of South Africa in 1951
Type and origin
- Power type: Steam
- Designer: Nigel Gresley
- Builder: LNER Doncaster Works
- Build date: 1935–1938
- Total produced: 35
Specifications
- Configuration
  - Whyte: 4-6-2
  - UIC: 2′C1′ h3
- Gauge: 4 ft 8 1/2 in (1,435 mm) standard gauge
- Leading dia.: 3 ft 2 in (0.965 m)
- Driver dia.: 6 ft 8 in (2.032 m)
- Trailing dia.: 3 ft 8 in (1.118 m)
- Length: 71 ft 3/8 in (21.650 m) (Inc. Tender)
- Width: 9 ft 0 in (2.743 m)
- Height: 13 ft 1 in (3.988 m)
- Loco weight: 102 long tons 19 cwt (230,600 lb or 104.6 t)
- Total weight: 167 long tons 2 cwt (374,300 lb or 169.8 t)
- Fuel type: Coal
- Fuel capacity: 8 long tons 0 cwt (17,900 lb or 8.1 t)
- Water cap.: 5,000 imp gal (23,000 L; 6,000 US gal)
- Boiler pressure: 250 psi (1.72 MPa)
- Cylinders: Three: two outside, one inside
- Cylinder size: 18.5 in × 26 in (470 mm × 660 mm)
- Valve gear: Outside: Walschaerts; Inside: Gresley conjugated
- Loco brake: Vacuum
- Train brakes: Vacuum; 60007, 60009 & 60019 have been fitted with air brakes
Performance figures
- Tractive effort: 35,455 lbf (157.71 kN)
Career
- Operators: London and North Eastern Railway, British Railways
- Class: A4
- Power class: BR: 8P6F
- Number in class: 35
- Numbers: LNER (until 1946/47): 2509–2512, 4462–4469, 4482–4500, 4900–4903; LNER (from 1946/47): 1–34 (not in order); BR: 60001–60034
- Nicknames: "Streak"
- Locale: East Coast Main Line
- Withdrawn: 1942 (1), 1962–1966
- Preserved: 4488, 4489, 4464, 4496, 4498, 4468
- Disposition: Six preserved, remainder scrapped.

The LNER Class A4 is a class of streamlined 4-6-2 steam locomotives designed by Nigel Gresley for the London and North Eastern Railway in 1935. Their streamlined design gave them high-speed capability as well as making them instantly recognisable, and one of the class, 4468 Mallard, holds the record as the world's fastest steam locomotive. Thirty-five of the class were built to haul express passenger trains on the East Coast Main Line route from London King's Cross via York to Newcastle, and later via Newcastle to Edinburgh. They remained in service on the East Coast Main Line until the early 1960s when they were replaced by Deltic diesel locomotives; they themselves proving to be worthy successors to the A4s. At least six A4s saw out their remaining days until 1966 in Scotland, particularly on the Aberdeen – Glasgow express trains, for which they were used to improve the timing from 3.5 to 3 hours.

== Overview ==
Gresley introduced the Class A4 locomotives in 1935 to haul streamlined Silver Jubilee trains between London King's Cross and Newcastle. The service was named in celebration of the Silver Jubilee of George V.

During a visit to Germany in 1933, Gresley had been inspired by high-speed streamlined Flying Hamburger diesel trains. The London and North Eastern Railway (LNER) had considered purchasing similar trains for use from London to Newcastle but the diesel units of the time could not carry enough passengers and were too expensive. Gresley was sure that steam could do equally well with a decent fare-paying load behind the locomotive. Following trials in 1935 in which one of his A3 Pacifics, No. 2750 Papyrus, recorded a new maximum of 108 mph (173.8 km/h) and completed the journey in under four hours, the LNER's Chief General Manager Ralph Wedgwood authorised Gresley to produce a streamlined development of the A3. Initially four locomotives were built, all with the word 'silver' in their names. The first was 2509 Silver Link, followed by 2510 Quicksilver, 2511 Silver King and 2512 Silver Fox. During a press run to publicise the service, Silver Link twice achieved a speed of 112.5 mph (181.1 km/h), breaking the British speed record, and sustained an average of 100 mph (160.9 km/h) over a distance of 43 miles (69.2 km).

Following the commercial success of the Silver Jubilee train, other streamlined services were introduced: The Coronation (London-Edinburgh, July 1937) and the West Riding Limited (Bradford & Leeds-London & return, November 1937) for which more A4s were built.

== Design ==
The A4 Pacifics were designed for high-speed passenger services. The application of internal streamlining to the steam circuit, higher boiler pressure and the extension of the firebox to form a combustion chamber all contributed to a more efficient locomotive than the A3; consumption of coal and water were reduced. A further design improvement was fitting a Kylchap double-chimney, first on No. 4468 Mallard in March 1938. The double-chimney improved the capability of the locomotives further, and the last three locomotives of the class (4901 Capercaillie, 4902 Seagull and 4903 Peregrine) were fitted with the Kylchap exhaust from new and the rest of the class acquired it in the late 1950s.

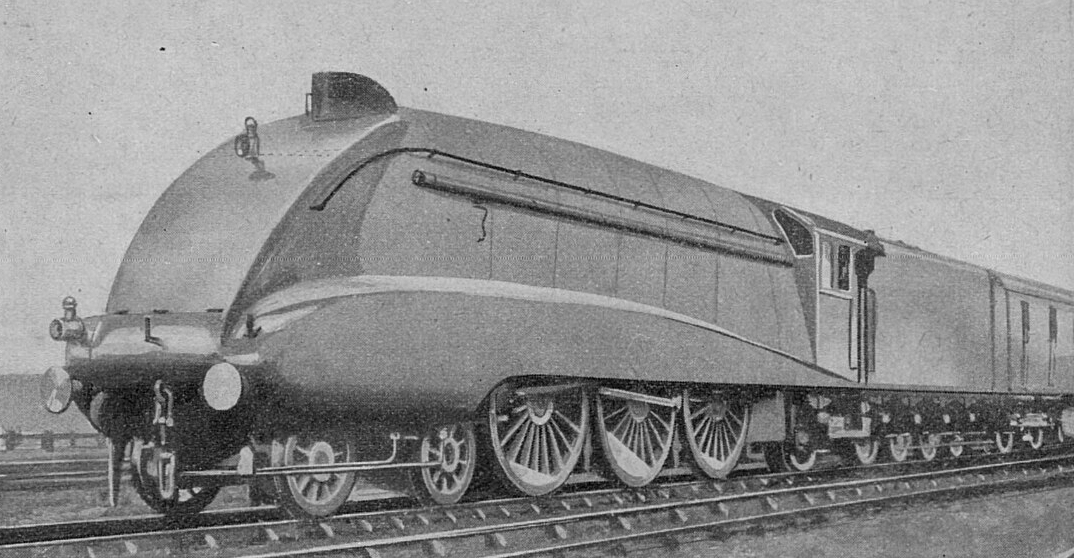
A painting of an unidentified A4, showing its original appearance with streamlined skirts covering the wheels.

The class was noted for its streamlined design, which not only improved its aerodynamics, increasing its speed capabilities, but also created an updraught to lift smoke away from the driver's line of vision, a problem inherent in many steam locomotives particularly those operated with short cut off valve events; fitting smoke deflectors was an alternative solution. The distinctive design made it a particularly attractive subject for artists, photographers and film-makers. The A4 Class locomotives were known by trainspotters as "streaks".

The streamlining side skirts (side valances) designed by Oliver Bulleid to aerofoil shape that were fitted to all the A4 locomotives, were removed during the Second World War to improve access to the valve gear for maintenance and were not replaced. This apart, the A4 was one of few streamlined steam locomotive designs in the world to retain its casing throughout its existence. Many similar designs, including the contemporary Coronation Class, had their streamlining removed or cancelled to cut costs, simplify maintenance and increase driver visibility.

== World record ==
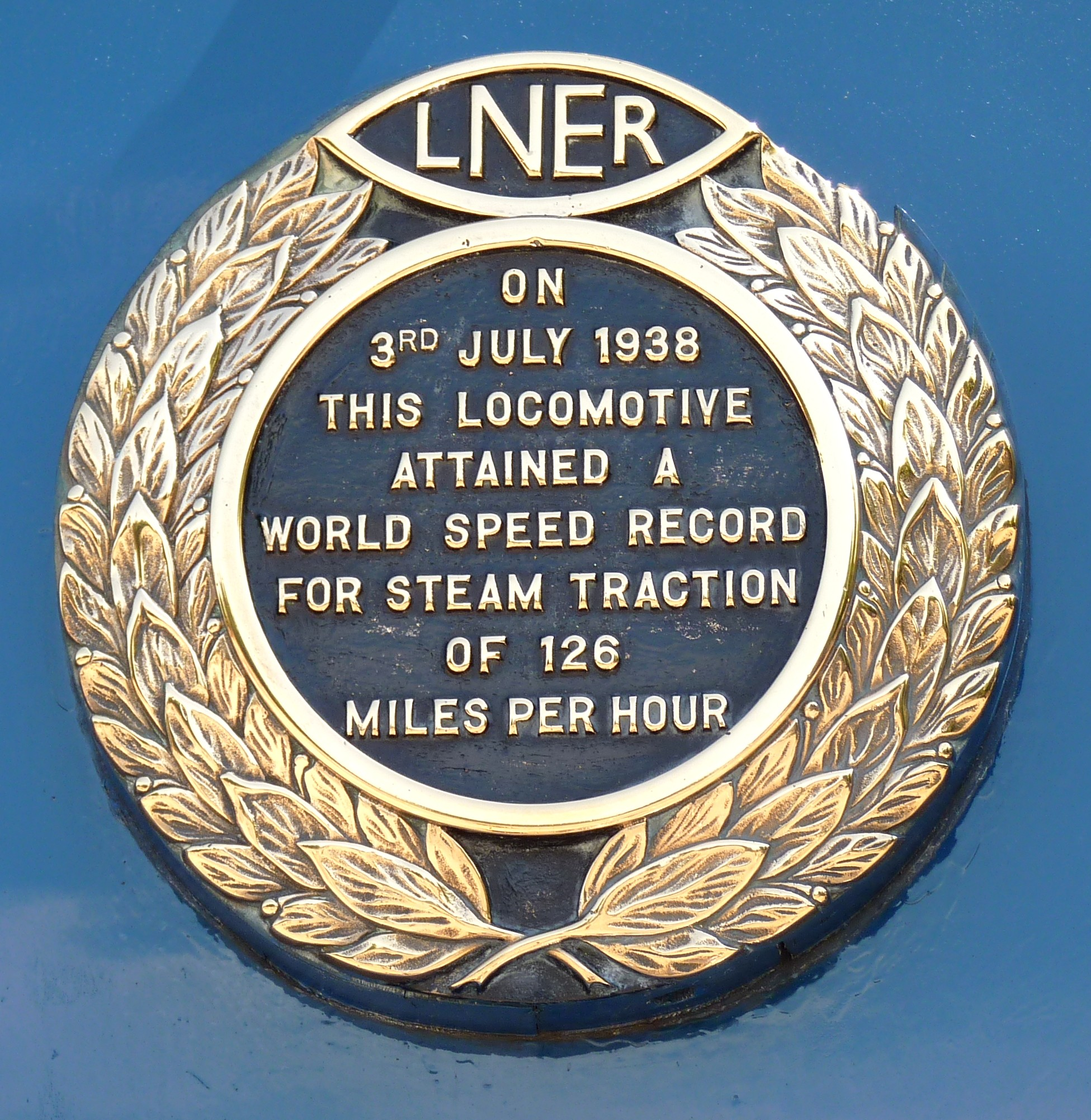
Plaque on Mallard in commemoration of breaking the previous world speed record of 124.5 mph

On 3 July 1938, 4468 Mallard - the first of the class to enter service with the Kylchap exhaust - pulling six coaches and a dynamometer car, set a world speed record (indicated by the dynamometer) of 126 mph (202.8 km/h). Gresley never accepted it as the record-breaking maximum. He claimed this speed could only have been attained over a few yards, though he was comfortable that the German speed record of 124.5 mph (200.4 km/h) had been surpassed. Close analysis of the dynamometer roll (currently at the NRM) of the record run confirms that Mallard's speed did in fact exceed that of the German BR 05 002. The Mallard record reached its maximum speed on a downhill run and failed technically in due course, whereas 05 002's journey was on level grade and the engine did not yet seem to be at its limit. On the other hand, the German train was four coaches long (197 tons), but Mallard's train had seven coaches (240 tons). One fact, often ignored when considering rival claims, is that Gresley and the LNER had just one serious attempt at the record, which was far from a perfect run with a 15 mph permanent way check just north of Grantham; despite this a record was set. Gresley planned another attempt in September 1939, but was prevented by the outbreak of World War II. Prior to the record run on 3 July 1938, it was calculated that 130 mph (210 km/h) was possible; Driver Duddington and LNER Inspector Sid Jenkins both said they might well have achieved this figure had they not had to slow for the Essendine junctions.

At the end of Mallard's record run, the middle big end (part of the motion for the inside cylinder) ran hot (indicated by the bursting of a heat-sensitive "stink bomb" placed in the bearing for warning purposes), the bearing metal had melted and the locomotive had to stop at Peterborough rather than continue to London. Deficiencies in the alignment of the Gresley-Holcroft derived motion meant that the inside cylinder of the A4 did more work at high speed than the two outside cylinders – on at least one occasion this led to the middle big end wearing to such an extent that the increased piston travel knocked the ends off the middle cylinder – and this overloading was mostly responsible for the failure.

== Performance in service ==
No other British steam locomotives have a longer or more consistent record of high speed running than the A4s. Instances of 100 mph running by them must exceed those of all other types combined, though 90 mph (140 km/h) running was a relatively rare event with steam traction, much less 100 mph (160 km/h). A4s operated on the East Coast Main Line which has more opportunities for high speed running (particularly Stoke Bank) than any other in the UK.

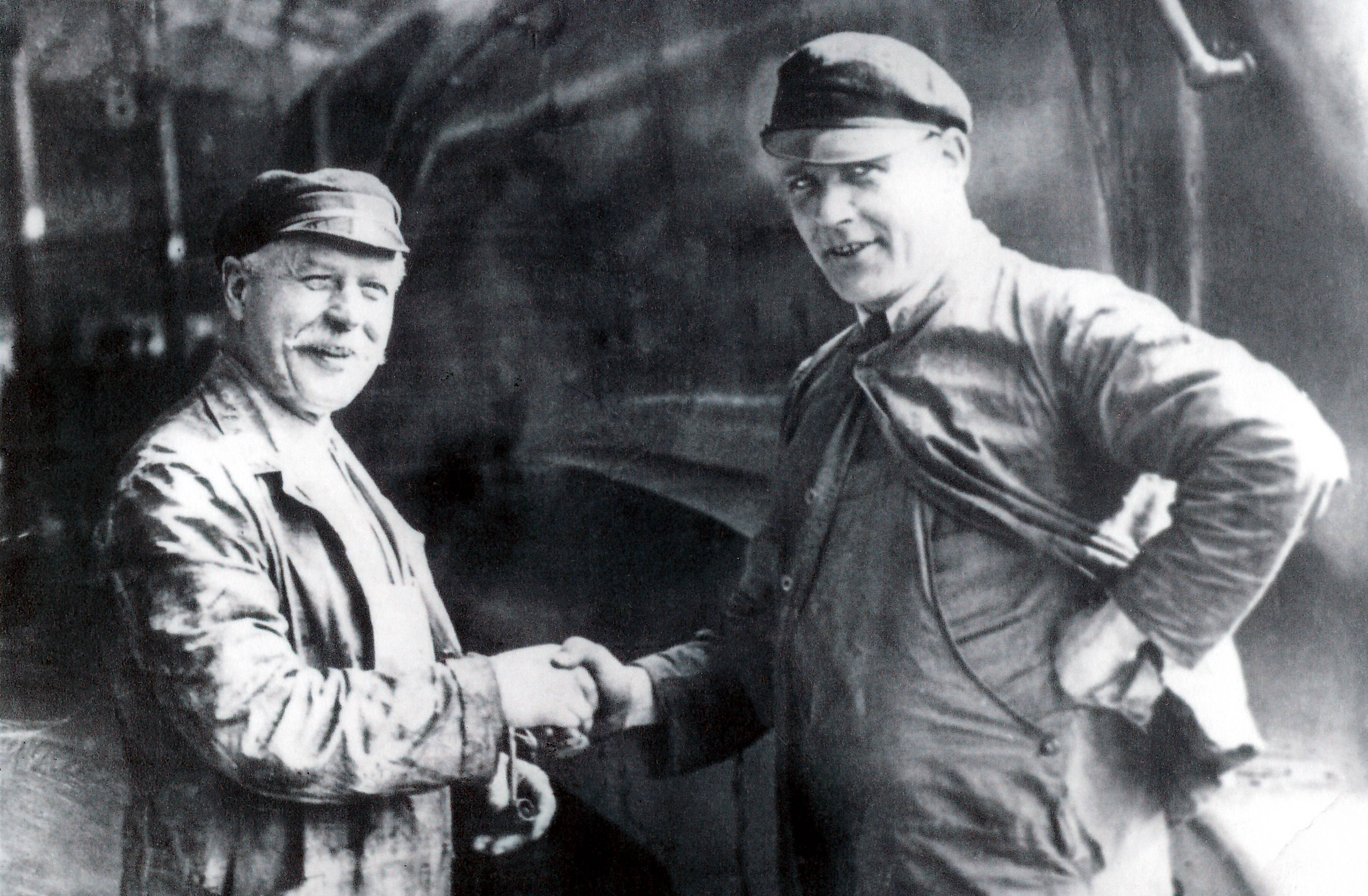
George Henry Haygreen (left) on his retirement day with Fireman Charlie Fisher

In August 1936, the Silver Jubilee train on the descent of Stoke Bank headed by No. 2512 Silver Fox driven by George Henry Haygreen achieved a maximum of 113 mph (181.9 km/h), then the highest speed attained in Britain with an ordinary passenger train. The fastest recorded post-war speed with British steam was also recorded by an A4. This occurred on 23 May 1959 on the Stephenson Locomotive Society Golden Jubilee special when No. 60007 Sir Nigel Gresley achieved 112 mph when hauling 400 tons down Stoke Bank. The driver, Bill Hoole, had hoped for an attempt to beat Mallard's record, but Alan Pegler, who was on the footplate and mindful of the risks, told him to ease off.

Although A4s were primarily designed for high speed express work they were also capable of high power outputs. In 1940, 4901 Capercaillie exerted 2,200 drawbar horsepower on the straight and level track north of York when hauling 21 coaches (730 tons gross) at an average of 75.9 mph (122.1 km/h) for 25 mi (40 km). On W.A. Tuplin's method for grading steam locomotive performance based on both power output and duration of effort, this was the highest value ever achieved by any British locomotive, at Grade 26.

The highest recorded power output from an A4 was 2,450 drawbar horsepower when Mallard itself was hauling 11 coaches (390 tons tare, 415 tons gross) up Stoke Bank at a sustained 80 mph (130 km/h) in 1963. O. S. Nock thought this performance superior to Mallard's world record run in 1938. An A4 with the same load on a "good run" would be doing about 50 to 60 mph (80 to 97 km/h) at the summit of Stoke Bank. On a run on 8 September 1961 Mallard had its train travelling at 78 mph (126 km/h).

== Post-war history ==
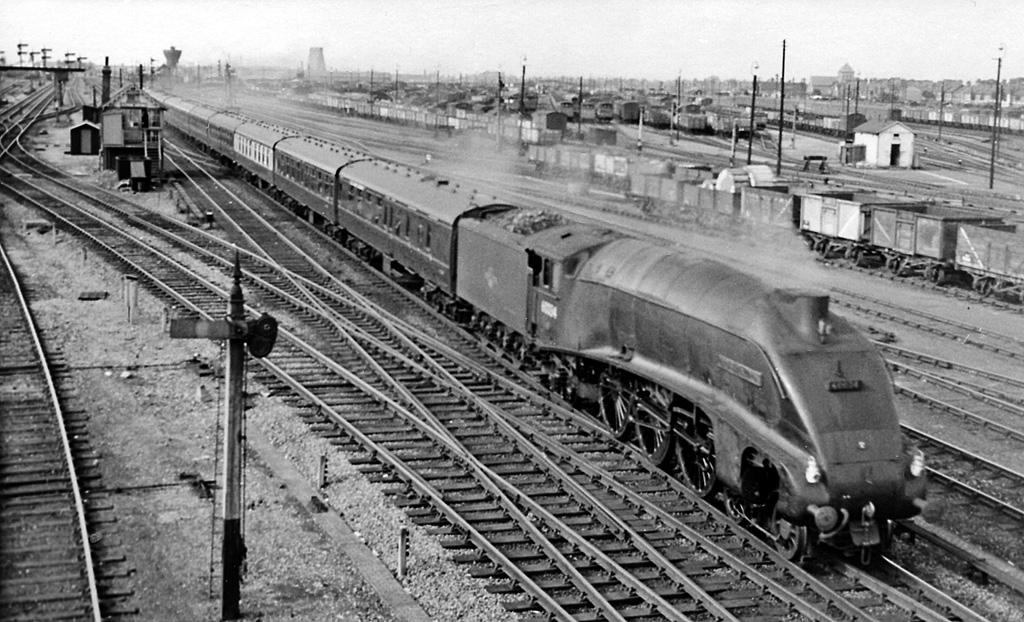
No. 60034 Lord Faringdon hauling a train at Peterborough railway station in 1959.

Although newer Pacifics had been introduced since the war and the streamlined trains were never reinstated, the A4s continued on top link duties, notably on the London to Edinburgh services.

Even after the war was over, the A4s still continued to perform non-stop services. In August 1948, No. 60028 Walter K. Whigham managed to perform a non-stop service run from King's Cross to Edinburgh, setting the record for distance travelled for 408.65 miles. It would hold this record until No. 4472 Flying Scotsman's visit to Australia in 1988.

Improved methods of aligning the Gresley conjugated valve gear in the 1950s led to tighter tolerances for the bearings used within it and, consequently, to almost total eradication of the overloading of the middle cylinder. History repeated itself with the inside big end being replaced by one of the Great Western type, after which there was no more trouble, provided that maintenance routines were respected.

The wholesale application of double Kylchap chimneys to the entire class was entirely due to the persistence of P.N. Townend, the Assistant Motive Power Superintendent at London King's Cross from 1956. He, at first, met with considerable resistance from higher authority. When permission was eventually given, it was found that the economy obtained over the single chimney A4s was from six to seven pounds of coal per mile, which more than justified the expense of the conversion.

These improvements led to greatly increased availability.

== Locomotive data ==
Original LNER number	Final LNER number	BR number	Doncaster Works number	Original name (rename(s))	Entered service	Withdrawn	Notes
2509	14	60014	1818	Silver Link	7 September 1935	29 December 1962	
2510	15	60015	1819	Quicksilver	21 September 1935	25 April 1963	
2511	16	60016	1821	Silver King	5 November 1935	19 March 1965	
2512	17	60017	1823	Silver Fox	18 December 1935	20 October 1963	
4482	23	60023	1847	Golden Eagle	22 December 1936	30 October 1964	
4483 (585)	24	60024	1848	Kingfisher	26 December 1936	5 September 1966	
4484 (586)	25	60025	1849	Falcon	23 January 1937	20 October 1963	
4485 (587)	26	60026	1850	Kestrel (Miles Beevor from November 1947)	20 February 1937	21 December 1965	
4486 (588)	27	60027	1851	Merlin	13 March 1937	3 September 1965	
4487	28	60028	1852	Sea Eagle (Walter K. Whigham from October 1947)	20 March 1937	29 December 1962	
4488	9	60009	1853	Union of South Africa (Osprey, its originally allocated name, during 1980s–90s due to opposition to apartheid)	29 June 1937	1 June 1966	Preserved
4489	10	60010	1854	Woodcock (Dominion of Canada from June 1937)	4 May 1937	29 May 1965	Preserved
4490	11	60011	1855	Empire of India	25 June 1937	11 May 1964	
4491	12	60012	1856	Commonwealth of Australia	22 June 1937	20 August 1964	
4492	13	60013	1857	Dominion of New Zealand	27 June 1937	18 April 1963	
4493	29	60029	1858	Woodcock	26 July 1937	20 October 1963	
4494	3	60003	1859	Osprey (Andrew K. McCosh from October 1942)	12 August 1937	29 December 1962	
4495	30	60030	1860	Great Snipe (Golden Fleece from September 1937)	30 August 1937	29 December 1962	
4496	8	60008	1861	Golden Shuttle (Dwight D. Eisenhower from September 1945)	4 September 1937	20 July 1963	Preserved
4497	31	60031	1862	Golden Plover	2 October 1937	29 October 1965	
4498	7	60007	1863	Sir Nigel Gresley	30 October 1937	1 February 1966	Preserved
4462	4	60004	1864	Great Snipe (William Whitelaw from July 1941)	10 December 1937	17 July 1966	
4463	18	60018	1865	Sparrow Hawk	27 November 1937	19 June 1963	
4464	19	60019	1866	Bittern	18 December 1937	5 September 1966	Preserved
4465	20	60020	1867	Guillemot	8 January 1938	20 March 1964	
4466	6	60006	1868	Herring Gull (Sir Ralph Wedgwood from January 1944)	26 January 1938	3 September 1965	
4467	21	60021	1869	Wild Swan	19 February 1938	20 October 1963	
4468	22	60022	1870	Mallard	3 March 1938	25 April 1963	Currently holds the world speed record for steam locomotives at 126 mph (203 km/h), preserved
4469	–	–	1871	Gadwall (Sir Ralph Wedgwood from March 1939)	March 1938	6 June 1942	Damaged beyond repair by bomb on 29 April 1942.
4499	2	60002	1872	Pochard (Sir Murrough Wilson from April 1939)	12 April 1938	4 May 1964	
4500	1	60001	1873	Garganey (Sir Ronald Matthews from March 1939)	26 April 1938	12 October 1964	
4900	32	60032	1874	Gannet	17 May 1938	20 October 1963	
4901	5	60005	1875	Capercaillie (Charles H. Newton from September 1942) (Sir Charles Newton from June 1943)	8 June 1938	12 March 1964	
4902	33	60033	1876	Seagull	28 June 1938	29 December 1962	
4903	34	60034	1877	Peregrine (Lord Faringdon from March 1948)	1 July 1938	24 August 1966	

The first four locomotives included the word 'silver' in their names because they were intended to haul the Silver Jubilee train. 2512 Silver Fox of this batch carried a stainless-steel fox near the centre of the streamline casing on each side, made by the Sheffield steelmakers Samuel Fox and Company. The next batch of A4s were named after birds, particularly those that were fast flyers, Gresley being a keen bird-watcher. Five (4488–92) were named after British Empire countries to haul the new Anglo-Scottish Coronation train; and two (4495/6), intended to haul the new West Riding Limited, received names connected to the wool trade: Golden Fleece and Golden Shuttle.

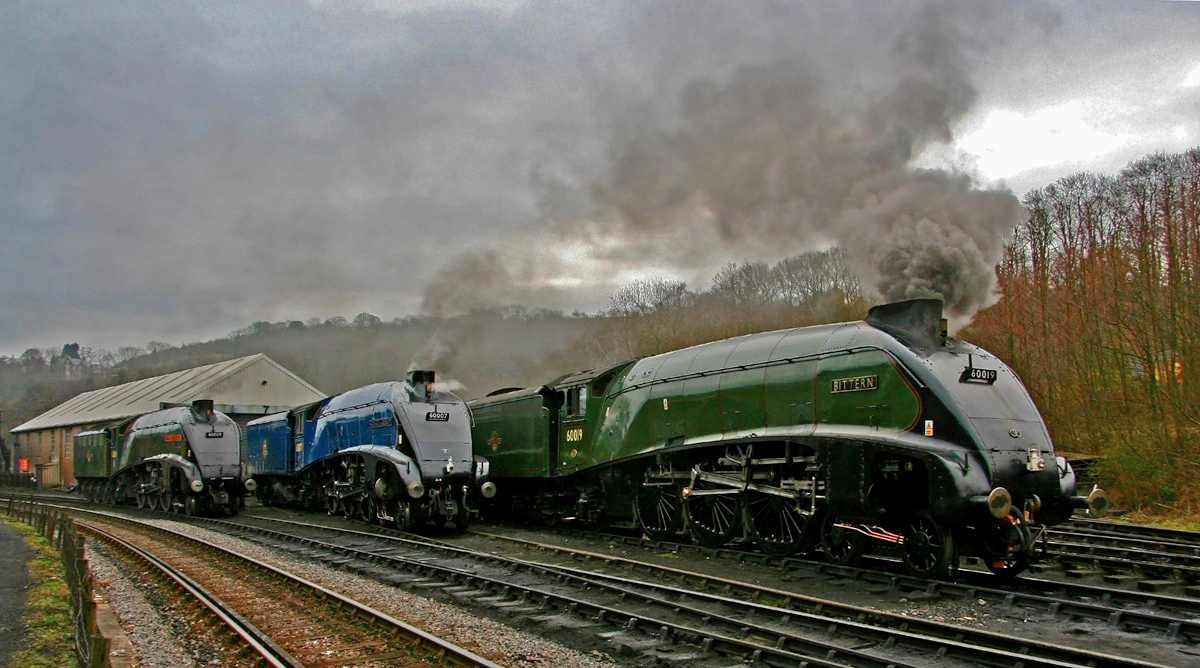
A rare gathering of three ex-LNER A4 locomotives at Grosmont, North Yorkshire Moors Railway, on 4 April 2008, as 60009 Union of South Africa, 60007 Sir Nigel Gresley and 60019 Bittern lined up at 7:30 am in preparation for service.

4498 was the hundredth Gresley Pacific to be built and was named after him. Subsequently, some other A4s were later renamed, usually to names of directors of the LNER.

== Withdrawal ==
One locomotive was withdrawn and scrapped after being damaged beyond repair in a German bombing raid on York on 29 April 1942 during World War II; this was No. 4469 Sir Ralph Wedgwood, which at the time had been overhauled and was based at Gateshead. It was running local trains to run it in and was stabled in York North Shed (now the National Railway Museum) where it suffered a direct hit; however, its tender survived and was later coupled to a Thompson A2/1.

The next five withdrawals, in December 1962, were: 60003 Andrew K. McCosh, 60014 Silver Link, 60028 Walter K. Whigham, 60030 Golden Fleece and 60033 Seagull. The rest of the class was withdrawn between 1963 and 1966. The last six in service were: 60004 William Whitelaw, 60007 Sir Nigel Gresley, 60009 Union of South Africa, 60019 Bittern, 60024 Kingfisher and 60034 Lord Faringdon. 60019 and 60024 were the last to be withdrawn in September 1966.

Year	Quantity in service at start of year	Quantity withdrawn	Locomotive numbers	Notes
1942	35	1	4469	Destroyed by bomb.
1962	34	5	60003/14/28/30/33	
1963	29	10	60008/13/15/17/18/21/22/25/29/32	60008/22 preserved.
1964	19	7	60001/02/05/11/12/20/23	
1965	12	6	60006/10/16/26/27/31	60010 preserved.
1966	6	6	60004/07/09/19/24/34	60007/09/19 preserved.

== Preservation ==
Six of the locomotives have been preserved. Four A4s are in the UK and have run on the BR main lines at some point during their preservation career. Another two (Dominion of Canada and Dwight D. Eisenhower) were donated to the Canada and the US, respectively, upon withdrawal by British Railways. Both North American-based A4s, along with the other three British-based A4s were moved to the National Railway Museum, York, in late 2012 on three-year loans as part of the NRM's 2013 celebrations of the 75th anniversary of Mallard breaking the world speed record for steam, bringing all six preserved A4s together. During 2013, 4464 Bittern underwent a series of high-speed runs, partly in commemoration of Mallard's record, partly to see if mainline speeds for certain heritage steam locomotives could be increased (The current maximum is 75 mph (121 km/h)). During the "Tyne Tees Streak" run, Bittern broke its own 91 mph speed record set just a few months prior by reaching a maximum speed of 93 mph (150 km/h) (149.7 km/h).

From 2015 to 2020, Union of South Africa was the only A4 operational with a valid mainline certificate until it expired in 2020; 60007 was withdrawn for overhaul on 20 September 2015 and 4464 operated until the end of 2015 at the Watercress Line when it was withdrawn and placed on static display in 2018 at Crewe. Union of South Africa was withdrawn in October 2021 due to boiler issues and with the coming expiration of its boiler certificate in early 2022. Sir Nigel Gresley returned to the mainline on 21 April 2022 and worked its inaugural railtour on 21 May 2022 following the completion of its major overhaul. As of 2023, 5 of 6 surviving A4's are on static display, the only working one being 60007 Sir Nigel Gresley. 60019 is planned to be moved from Margate to North Yorkshire for a mainline standard overhaul in 2024.

Loco numbers in bold mean their current number.

Image	Numbers			Name	Service life		Home base	Current livery	Corridor tender	Owner	Condition	Notes
Image	Original LNER number	LNER 1946	BR number	Name	Build date	Length	Home base	Current livery	Corridor tender	Owner	Condition	Notes
	**4464**	19	60019	Bittern	December 1937	28 years, 8 months (Note: December 1937 - September 1966)	Crewe LNWR	LNER Garter Blue	Yes	Jeremy Hosking	Static Display	(Note: Last to be withdrawn alongside 60024 Kingfisher. Currently in LNER Garter Blue livery and static display at the former Hornby factory in Margate, Kent. Planned to be moved to North Yorkshire for overhaul in 2024.)
	**4468**	22	60022	Mallard	March 1938	25 years, 1 month (Note: March 1938 - April 1963)	National Railway Museum	LNER Garter Blue	No	National Collection	Static display	(Note: First to enter preservation. Was operational between 1986 and 1988.)
	4488	9	**60009**	Union of South Africa (Note: Osprey 1988–1990)	April 1937	28 years, 11 months (Note: June 1937 - June 1966)	Thornton Yard	BR Brunswick Green, late crest	Yes	John Cameron	Static display	(Note: Withdrawn from service on 5 October 2021 due to boiler issues and boiler ticket expiry in early 2022. Due to controversial and political issues in South Africa in the 1980s involving racial apartheid the engine was renamed to Osprey. It returned to its original name in the 1990s.)
	**4489**	10	60010	Dominion of Canada (Note: originally Woodcock until June 1937)	May 1937	28 years (Note: May 1937 - May 1965)	Canadian Railway Museum	LNER Garter Blue	Yes	Canadian Railway Museum	Static display in Canada.	(Note: Originally planned to be named Buzzard, but was changed to Woodcock and then changed to Dominion of Canada. The name Woodcock was given to engine No. 4493.)
	4496	8	**60008**	Dwight D. Eisenhower (Note: originally Golden Shuttle until September 1945)	September 1937	25 years, 10 months (Note: September 1937 - July 1963)	National Railroad Museum	BR Brunswick Green, late crest	No	National Railroad Museum	Static display in the USA.	(Note: Originally planned to be named Sparrow Hawk but was named Golden Shuttle instead and was eventually renamed to Dwight D Eisenhower. The name Sparrow Hawk was used for engine No. 4463.)
	4498	7	**60007**	Sir Nigel Gresley	October 1937	28 years, 3 months (Note: October 1937 - February 1966)	Locomotive Services Ltd. Crewe depot	BR Express Passenger Blue, early emblem	Yes	Sir Nigel Gresley Locomotive Trust	Operational, Boiler Ticket Expires: 2032.	(Note: Moved to the Severn Valley Railway for test running and appeared at the April Spring Steam Gala. Worked Inaugural mainline railtour on 21 May 2022.)

== Models ==
One of the first two Hornby Dublo locomotive models produced, in 1938, was an A4. In 1999 a 'Super Detail' Hornby A4 was released, later complemented by a budget 'Railroad' model Hornby also produced an 'OO'-scale live steam version in September 2003, that used an electrically heated boiler to produce steam – not previously possible in such a small model. Trix produced an 'OO' scale model A4 from 1970; it was re-branded as a Liliput model in 1974 and survives to this day in modified form as a Bachmann model – Kader, Bachmann's parent company, had bought Liliput in 1993. In September 2004, Hornby unveiled retooled OO gauge models of the A4 in LNER blue, LNER black and BR green.

During the 1980s, Minitrix produced British N gauge models of Mallard, both as 4468 in LNER blue and 60022 in BR green, and 4498 Sir Nigel Gresley in LNER blue. From the 1990s, Graham Farish produced British N gauge models of the A4. In 2012, Dapol introduced a British N gauge model of 60017 Silver Fox in BR green.

== Video links ==
- 1935, Demonstration run of Silver Jubilee to Grantham
- 1944, Retirement of driver Duddington
