= Steam brake =

Type of brake used on steam locomotives

A steam brake is a type of brake for steam locomotives and their tenders, whereby a steam cylinder works directly on the brake linkages.

Steam brakes were primarily used on railways where vacuum brakes were used to brake the train, but where there was no vacuum brake on the steam locomotive itself, as for example in the United Kingdom, or where there was only a cable-operated brake (e.g. a Heberlein brake) running along the train, like for example in Saxony on the narrow gauge railways.

Steam brakes are usually found today on heritage steam locomotives.

== Operation ==
Steam is supplied to the steam brake cylinders from the locomotive boiler via a valve (the brake valve) which may have several fixed settings or be infinitely variable. The piston in the steam cylinder is set in motion by the steam admitted, the piston rod transfers the brake force via a system of rods to the brake blocks of the vehicle, thus achieving the braking effect. A return spring returns the piston to its rest position as soon as the steam supply is interrupted. The expanded and condensed steam is drained from the steam cylinder through a drain valve (Entwässerungsventil).

=== Direct steam brake ===
A steam brake acts directly and immediately; the sudden opening of the brake valve can easily result in overbraking by locking the wheels. The operation of a steam brake therefore requires a great deal of experience from the engine driver.

=== Vacuum controlled steam brake ===
A steam brake can be operated directly by a lever (valve) and also indirectly together with the vacuum brake. In the latter case, a control valve linked to the vacuum system controls the admission of steam to the brake cylinder, so that the steam brake can be activated automatically in an emergency or if the train separates (the so-called 'automatic steam brake').

== Literature ==
- Hodgson, Lake: Locomotive Management (9th Edition, 1948). The St Margaret's Technical Press Ltd
