= John Hawksworth =

John Hawksworth may refer to:

- Johnny Hawksworth, British musician and composer
- John Hawksworth (golfer), English golfer
- John Hawksworth (economist), chief economist for PriceWaterhouseCoopers

== See also ==
- John Hawkesworth (disambiguation)
