= Daphne Oram =

British composer and electronic musician (1925–2003)

Background information
- Born: Daphne Blake Oram; 31 December 1925; Devizes, Wiltshire, England
- Died: 5 January 2003 (aged 77) Maidstone, Kent, England
- Genres: Electronic music; experimental; musique concrète; library music
- Occupations: Composer, electronic musician
- Instrument: Synthesiser

Daphne Blake Oram (31 December 1925 – 5 January 2003) was a British composer and electronic musician. She was one of the first British composers to produce electronic sound, and was an early practitioner of musique concrète in the UK. As a co-founder of the BBC Radiophonic Workshop, she was central to the development of British electronic music. Her uncredited scoring work on the 1961 film The Innocents helped to pioneer the electronic soundtrack.

Oram was the creator of the Oramics technique for graphical sound. She was the first woman to independently direct and set up a personal electronic music studio, and the first woman to design and construct an electronic musical instrument. In her book An Individual Note of Music, Sound and Electronics (1971) she explored philosophical themes related to acoustics and electronic composition.

== Early life and education ==
Oram was born to James and Ida Oram on 31 December 1925 in Devizes, Wiltshire, England. Her childhood home was within 10 miles of the stone circles of Avebury and 20 miles from Stonehenge. Her father was the President of the Wiltshire Archeological Society in the 1950s. Educated at Sherborne School for Girls in Dorset, she was taught piano, organ and musical composition from an early age.

== Career ==
=== Work at the BBC ===
In 1942, Oram was offered a place at the Royal College of Music, but instead took up a position as a Junior Studio Engineer and "music balancer" at the BBC. One of her job responsibilities was "shadowing" live concerts with a pre-recorded version so the broadcast would go on if interrupted by "enemy action". Other job duties included creating sound effects for radio shows and mixing broadcast levels. During this period she became aware of developments in electronic sound and began experimenting with tape recorders, often staying after hours to work late into the night. She recorded sounds on to tape, and then cut, spliced and looped, slowed them down, sped up, and played them backwards.

Oram also dedicated time in the 1940s to composing music, including an electroacoustic work entitled Still Point. This was an innovative piece for turntables, "double orchestra" and five microphones. Many consider Still Point the first composition that combined acoustic orchestration with live electronic manipulation. Rejected by the BBC and never performed during Oram's lifetime, Still Point remained unheard for 70 years; on 24 June 2016 composer Shiva Feshareki and the London Contemporary Orchestra performed it for the first time. Following the discovery of the finalised score, the premiere of the revised version of Still Point was performed at the BBC Proms in London on 23 July 2018 by Feshareki and James Bulley with the LCO.

In the 1950s, Oram was promoted to a music studio manager at the BBC. Following a trip to the RTF studios in Paris, she began to campaign for the BBC to provide electronic music facilities, utilizing electronic music and musique concrète techniques, for use in its programming. In 1957 she was commissioned to compose music for a production of the play Amphitryon 38. She created this piece using a sine wave oscillator, a tape recorder and self-designed filters, thereby producing the first wholly electronic score in BBC history. Along with fellow electronic musician and BBC colleague Desmond Briscoe, she began to receive commissions for many other works, including a production of Samuel Beckett's All That Fall (1957). As demand grew for these electronic sounds, the BBC gave Oram and Briscoe a budget to establish the BBC Radiophonic Workshop in early 1958, where she was the first Studio Manager. The workshop was focused on creating sound effects and theme music for all of the BBC's output, including the science fiction TV serial Quatermass and the Pit (1958–59) and the sounds of "Major Bloodnok's Stomach" for the radio comedy series The Goon Show.

In October 1958, Oram was sent by the BBC to the "Journées Internationales de Musique Expérimentale" at Expo 58 in Brussels, where Edgard Varèse presented his electroacoustic work Poème électronique in the Philips Pavilion (alongside Pavilion architect Iannis Xenakis' piece Concret PH). After hearing some of the work produced by her contemporaries, and unhappy with the BBC's continued refusal to push electronic composition into the foreground of their activities, she decided to resign from the Radiophonic Workshop less than one year after it had opened, hoping to develop her techniques further on her own.

In 1965, Oram produced the piece Pulse Persephone for the "Treasures of the Commonwealth" exhibition at the Royal Academy of the Arts.

=== Film ===
Oram provided the prominent electronic sounds for the soundtrack of Dr. No (1962) from her six-minute work Atoms in Space, but she was not credited in the film. These sounds were also used in the following two James Bond films. Oram also manipulated Johnny Hawksworth's soundtrack for Snow (1963), a short documentary by Geoffrey Jones; after the success of Snow, she worked with Jones again on Rail (1967).

=== Oramics ===
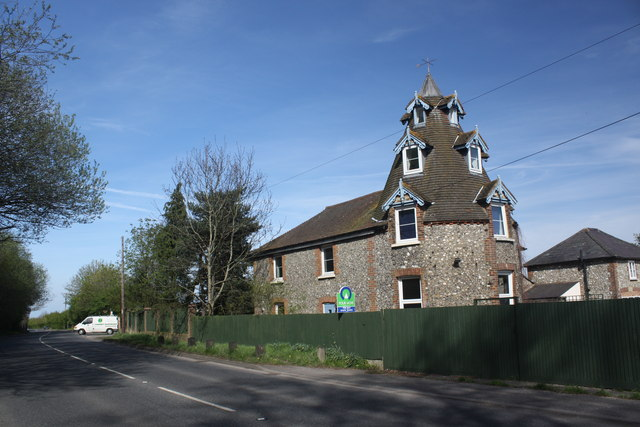
Tower Folly in Fairseat, Kent, where Oram established her Oramics Studios

"We will be entering a strange world where composers will be mingling with capacitors, computers will be controlling crotchets and, maybe, memory, music and magnetism will lead us towards metaphysics."

— Daphne Oram, An Individual Note of Music, Sound and Electronics (1971)

Immediately after leaving the BBC in 1959, Oram established the Oramics Studios for Electronic Composition in Tower Folly, a converted oast house at Fairseat, Kent, near Wrotham.

Oramics, which Oram devised along with engineer Graham Wrench, is a graphical sound technique that involves drawing directly onto 35mm film. Shapes and designs for various parameters of sound etched into the film strips are read by photo-electric cells and transformed into sounds. According to Oram, "Every nuance, every subtlety of phrasing, every tone gradation or pitch inflection must be possible just by a change in the written form."

Financial pressures meant it was necessary to maintain her work as a commercial composer, and her work covered a wider range than the Radiophonic Workshop. She produced music for not only radio and television but also theatre, short commercial films, sound installations and exhibitions, including electronic sounds for Jack Clayton's horror film The Innocents (1961), concert works such as Four Aspects (1960), and collaborations with composers Thea Musgrave and Ivor Walsworth.

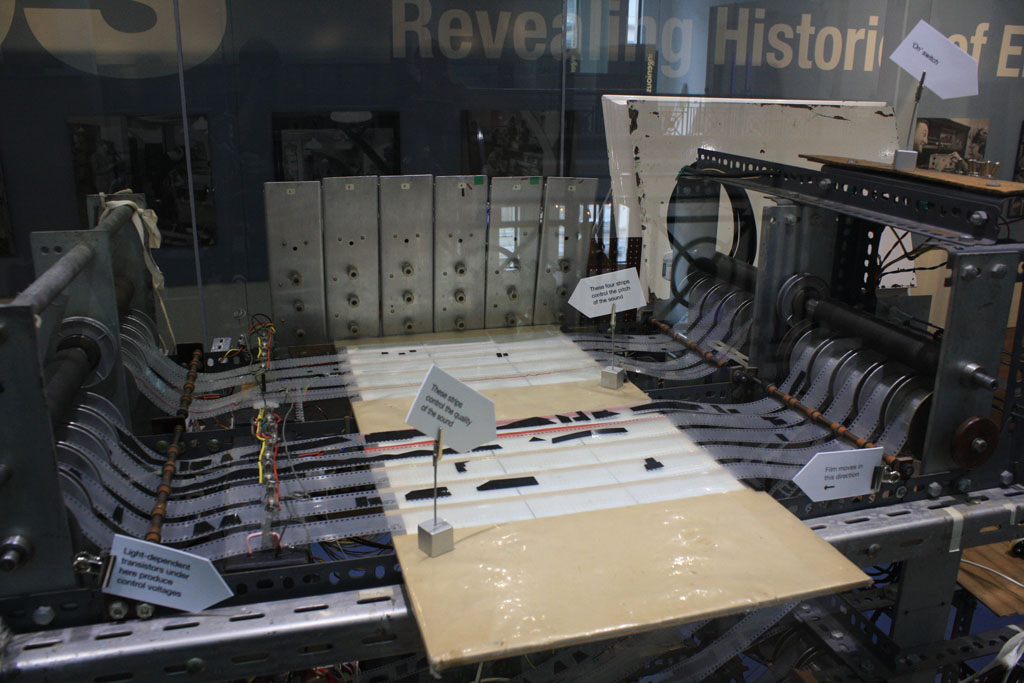
Oramics machine displayed at the Science Museum, London (2011)

In February 1962, Oram was awarded a grant of £3,550 (equivalent to £66,000 in 2025) from the Calouste Gulbenkian Foundation to support the development of the Oramics system; a second Gulbenkian grant of £1,000 was awarded in 1965. Oram's first composition using the Oramics machine, entitled "Contrasts Essonic", was recorded in 1963. As the Oramics project evolved, Oram's focus turned to the subtle nuances and interactions between sonic parameters, and she applied her research to the nonlinear behavior of the human ear and to perception of the brain's apprehension of the world. She used Oramics to study vibrational phenomena, divided into "commercial Oramics" and "mystical Oramics", and the Oramics machine became used more for research than composition. In her notes, Oram defined Oramics as "the study of sound and its relationship to life."

In the mid-1980s, Oram worked on a software version of Oramics for the Acorn Archimedes computer using grant money received from the Ralph Vaughan Williams Trust. She wished to continue her "mystical Oramics" research, but a lack of funding prevented this project from being fully realized.

== Written works ==
Throughout her career, Oram lectured on electronic music and studio techniques. Her book An Individual Note of Music, Sound and Electronics (1971) investigates acoustics and the history and techniques of electronic music in a philosophical manner. A new edition of the book was published by Anomie Publishing in December 2016. In the book, Oram characterised her one of her musical machines as a control system that computed the resulting feedback, reflecting the influence of cybernetics, although Oram's commitment to the composer's authorial control set her at odds with the canon of self-generating computer music.

In the late 1970s, Oram began a second book, which survives in manuscript, titled The Sound of the Past – A Resonating Speculation. In this manuscript, she speculates on archaeological acoustics, and presents a theory suggesting that Neolithic chambered cairns and ancient sites such as Stonehenge and the Great Pyramid of Giza were used as acoustic resonators. She said that her research suggested that the people of these eras may have possessed acute knowledge about the properties of sound in long-distance communication.

== Death ==
In the 1990s, Oram suffered two strokes and was forced to stop working, later moving to a nursing home. She died in Maidstone, Kent, on 5 January 2003, aged 77.

== Archive ==
After Oram's death, a large archive relating to her life's work passed to composer Hugh Davies. When Davies died two years later, this material passed to the Sonic Arts Network, and in 2008 the archive went to Goldsmiths, University of London. It is now held within Goldsmiths Special Collections & Archives, where it is open for public access and ongoing research. The launch of the archive was celebrated with a symposium and a series of concerts at the Southbank Centre. This included a concert of newly reworked versions of material from the collection by People Like Us.

In 2007, a two-CD compilation of her music, entitled Oramics, was released.

In 2008, a BBC Radio 3 documentary on Oram's life was broadcast as part of the Sunday Feature strand, entitled Wee Have Also Sound-Houses. (Note: Wee Have Also Sound-Houses is a quotation from Francis Bacon's 1626 utopian novel New Atlantis. Oram often referred to this quotation, and gave an extended quotation from this passage at the end of her book An Individual Note, beginning: Wee have also Sound-Houses, wher wee practise and demonstrate all Sounds, and their Generation. Wee have Harmonies which you have not, of Quarter-Sounds and lesser Slides of Sounds. [...] — Francis Bacon, New Atlantis (1626))

== Legacy ==
Oram's work at the Radiophonic Workshop also helped pave the way for Delia Derbyshire, who arrived at the BBC in 1960 and realised the original Doctor Who theme music from a score composed by Ron Grainer in 1963.

Oram furthered music philosophy in her writings, and dedicated time to considering the human element in connection to acoustics. In her unfinished manuscript, The Sound of the Past, a Resonating Speculation, she postulated that ancient civilizations might have done this to a highly evolved degree. In a letter to Sir George Trevelyan, Oram expressed hope that her work on Oramics would plant seeds that would mature in the 21st century.

The Daphne Oram Creative Arts Building at Canterbury Christ Church University was opened in 2019.

=== Click tribute ===
In its first show of 2012, the BBC television technology programme Click featured a piece about Daphne Oram, mainly prompted by the three-part Oramics Machine being on display at the Science Museum, London during a year-long exhibition on the history of electronic music. The programme showed the machine being installed in a large display cabinet, and described how it was no longer possible to play due to its fragile state. However, an interactive, virtual version of the machine has been created, which allows visitors to create their own compositions. The programme showed archive footage of Oram describing the process of what became Oramics, also showing her 'drawing' the music, then playing her machine. The piece described Oram as an 'unsung hero' of electronic music.

=== Daphne Oram's Wonderful World of Sound ===
Daphne Oram's Wonderful World of Sound is a play that detailed Oram's life and career. It was presented by Blood of the Young and Tron Theatre. The play premiered in Glasgow on 9 May 2017 and toured around Scotland from May 2017 to June 2017. The play was written by Isobel McArthur and directed by Paul Brotherston. It was live-scored by Anneke Kampman, a Scottish electronic sound artist.

=== The Oram Awards ===
The annual Oram Awards was launched by the PRS Foundation and the New BBC Radiophonic Workshop to celebrate "emerging artists in the fields of music, sound and related technologies in honour of Daphne Oram, and other pioneering women in music and sound." The inaugural Oram Awards took place on 3 July 2017 at the Turner Contemporary in Margate, as a part of the Oscillate Festival of Experimental Music and Sound. Two female innovators received a prize of £1,000, while six others received £500.

=== BBC masterbrand sonic ===
The 2022 BBC masterbrand sonic, created by Zelig Sound was internally known as "Daphne"

== Discography ==
- "Electronic Sound Patterns" (1962), single, also included on Listen, Move and Dance Volume 1 from same year with work from Vera Gray
- Oramics (2007), compilation on Paradigm Discs
- "Spaceship UK: The Untold Story of the British Space Programme" (2010), promotional 7" split single with Belbury Poly
- Private Dreams and Public Nightmares (2011), remix album by Andrea Parker and Daz Quayle on Aperture
- The Oram Tapes: Volume 1 (2011), compilation on Young Americans
- Sound Houses (2014), remix album by Walls
- Pop Tryouts (2015), mini album on cassette and download on Was Ist Das?

== Publication ==
- Oram, Daphne (1972). An Individual Note - of music, sound and electronics. London: Galliard. ISBN 0852491093.

Second edition, 2016, Anomie Publishing ISBN 978-1910221112
Third edition, 2020, The Daphne Oram Trust and Anomie Publishing
