= BR standard class 2 =

BR Standard Class 2 may refer to:

- BR Standard Class 2 2-6-0
- BR Standard Class 2 2-6-2T
