= 2MT (disambiguation) =

2MT was the first British radio station to make regular entertainment broadcasts.

2MT may also refer to:

- Various railway locomotives, including:
  - LMS Ivatt Class 2 2-6-0
  - LMS Ivatt Class 2 2-6-2T
  - BR Standard Class 2 2-6-0
  - BR Standard Class 2 2-6-2T
