= Rail (1967 film) =

1967 British film by Geoffrey Jones

- Titlescreen during the film's opening montage of Victorian railway stations.
- Directed by: Geoffrey Jones
- Produced by: Edgar Anstey
- Cinematography: Wolfgang Suschitzky
- Music by: Wilfred Josephs; Daphne Oram; Marcus Dods (conductor)
- Distributed by: British Transport Films
- Release date: 1967
- Running time: 13.5 minutes
- Country: United Kingdom

Rail is a short 13.5 minute documentary film made by Geoffrey Jones for British Transport Films between 1963 and 1967, prompted by the success of Snow.

== Summary ==
The "pure cinema" film illustrated the transition from steam powered locomotives to diesel and electric traction which was taking place during that period.

== Production ==
Nominated for a BAFTA Film Award for Best Short Film in 1968, it took four years to make. During this time British Railways changed their branding to "British Rail", as well as their livery, which required Jones to modify his plans for the film on his return from filming Trinidad And Tobago in 1964.
