= Snowdrift at Bleath Gill =

Coordinates: 54°30′41.12″N 2°13′17.04″W

- Snowdrift at Bleath Gill
- Directed by: Kenneth Fairbairn
- Produced by: Edgar Anstey
- Cinematography: Robert Paynter; David Watkin
- Music by: Hubert Clifford; Sidney Torch; Charles Williams
- Distributed by: British Transport Films
- Release date: 1955
- Running time: 10 minutes
- Country: United Kingdom

Snowdrift at Bleath Gill is a 1955 British Transport Film documentary directed by Kenneth Fairbairn. The 10-minute-long film presents a first-hand account of a team of British Railways workmen freeing a goods train stuck in a snowdrift on the South Durham and Lancashire Union Railway at Bleath Gill in the Pennines on the border between County Durham, Yorkshire and Westmorland. A fine example of an industrial documentary, the British Film Institute call it "One of the most outstanding films of its kind".

== Production ==
BR Standard Class 2 2-6-0 No. 78018, hauling the 4:20 am goods train, set out from Kirkby Stephen on the morning of Thursday, 24 February 1955, hauling eight 20-ton wagons of limestone and minerals. At 5 am, she became stuck at Bleath Gill, just north of Barras railway station and near Stainmore Summit which at 1,370 feet (420 m) high was the highest point on any railway line in England until its closure in 1962. The train, along with its crew remained stranded there until 3 pm the following Monday, when the first rescue teams arrived.

On the rescue train were a crew of BTF staff—director Kennith Fairbairn, cameraman Robert Paynter and assistant David Watkin—who had been hurriedly assigned by producer Edgar Anstey to travel to Barnard Castle to join the snowplough and a gang of fifty men travelling up the line to free the train.

The task was an arduous one; winds of 40 miles per hour (60 km/h) were blowing across the summit, which coupled with the arctic-like weather conditions to produce a terrible wind chill factor. The film crew themselves had not prepared for the filming, having been summoned to make the film at short notice; Bob Paynter recalled in 2008 that the film crew had not even brought anything to eat with them, and had to rely on the generosity of the workmen. The light for the film was provided by large Tilley lamps, a type of pressure lamp, which needed pumping-up by hand frequently.

Having dug the engine out of the snowdrift during the night, moving the steam locomotive was another difficult task; when a steam train gets stuck in snow, the heat from its boiler melts the snow around it, but as the boiler cools the melted snow refreezes as ice, meaning that the engine is frozen solid. Workmen had to drape paraffin-soaked rags around the moving parts of the engine and set fire to them to thaw the motion.

David Watkin, the camera assistant on the film (who later became an Oscar-winning cinematographer) recalled that at a subsequent screening of the film in the area, one of the railway officials commented "If it hadn't been for the fucking film people we'd have just left her to thaw out."

== Analysis ==
Most of the film is shot at night, which coupled with the black-and-white cinematography and paraffin lamp-lighting, gives the film an evocative atmosphere. The film was edited by John Legard, who noted during a BBC Four documentary about British Transport Films that the shot of the snowplough charging into the snowdrift the morning after the digging was completed is particularly memorable. Like the earlier Elizabethan Express of 1954, the film features a commentary written by Paul le Saux, narrated by Deryck Guyler and Ben Williams. The film features a soundtrack of library music tracks by Hubert Clifford, Sidney Torch and Charles Williams.

In the 2008 BBC Four documentary, Dominic Sandbrook noted that in its celebration of hard manual labour the film is almost reminiscent of Soviet propaganda films. All of the people featured in the film are railway workmen from Darlington, West Auckland and Barnard Castle, as opposed to actors (as was sometimes the case in documentaries of the era). The author John Tomlinson cites this film as typifying the film unit's "celebration of energetic progressive industry".

Although the South Durham and Lancashire Union Railway line over the Pennines was closed completely in 1965, the rescued steam locomotive – BR Standard Class 2 No. 78018 – was preserved and is currently operational on the Great Central Railway. The snow plough seen is also preserved on the North Yorkshire Moors Railway. The original Stainmore Summit board is now held at the National Railway Museum at York. The film is currently available on DVD from the British Film Institute's British Transport Films collection (volume 1) and Blu-ray on The Best of The British Transport Films. The film was sometimes used as a ten-minute "filler" on BBC Four (alternating with its BTF sibling John Betjeman Goes By Train, also ten minutes in duration) and has also been shown on the archive film channel Talking Pictures TV.

== See also ==
- Snow – a 1963 multi-award-winning BTF classic showing British Railway's dedication to battling blizzard conditions using an eight-minute montage cut to a jazzy sixties soundtrack.
