= The Elizabethan =

British named passenger train (London–Edinburgh)

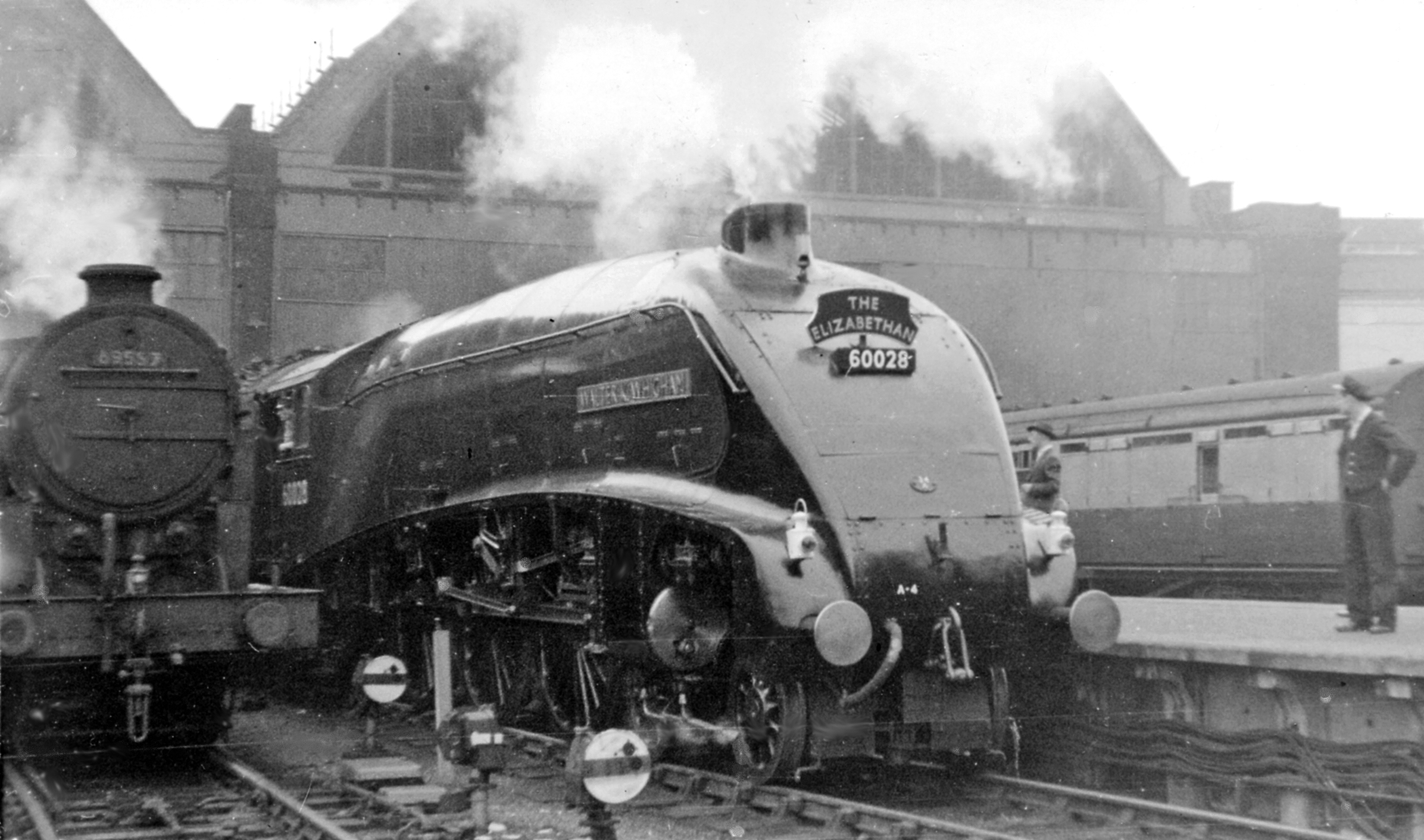
- Gresley A4 4-6-2 No. 60028 'Walter K. Whigham’ stands ready at London King's Cross for the inaugural service on 29 June 1953.

Overview
- Service type: Passenger train
- Predecessor: Capitals Limited
- First service: 29 June 1953
- Last service: 1963
- Former operator(s): BR

Route
- Termini: London King’s Cross; Edinburgh Waverley railway station
- Stops: none
- Distance travelled: 394 mi (634 km)
- Service frequency: Daily
- Line(s) used: East Coast Mainline

On-board services
- Catering facilities: yes
- Baggage facilities: yes

Technical
- Track owner(s): British Railways
Route map
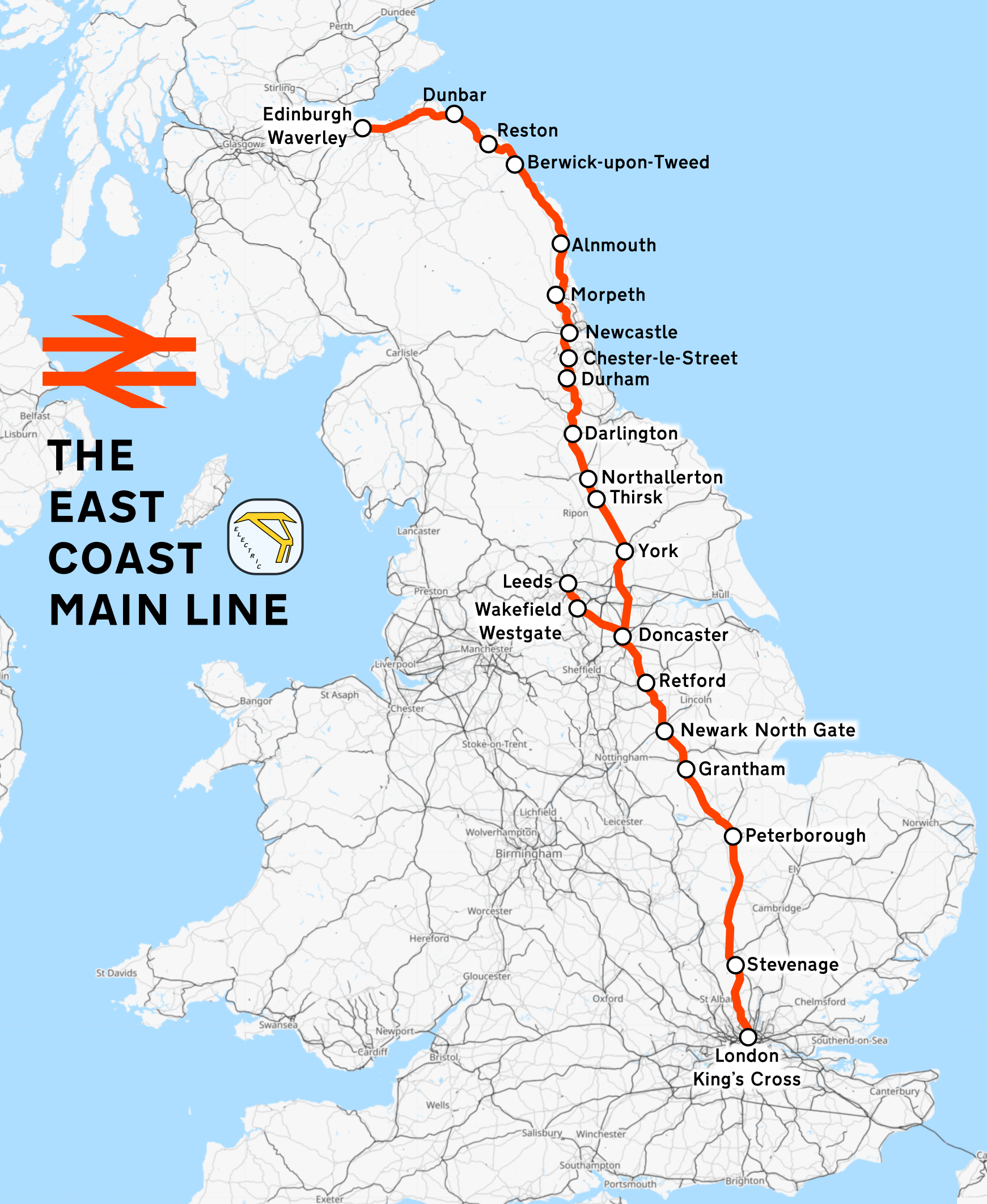
- (Click to expand)

The Elizabethan was a British Railways non-stop passenger train that ran between London King's Cross and Edinburgh Waverley in the United Kingdom. The daily service, which operated for ten years from 1953 to 1963, took just over 6hrs. It was hauled by steam engines until they were replaced by diesel units in 1961.

== History ==
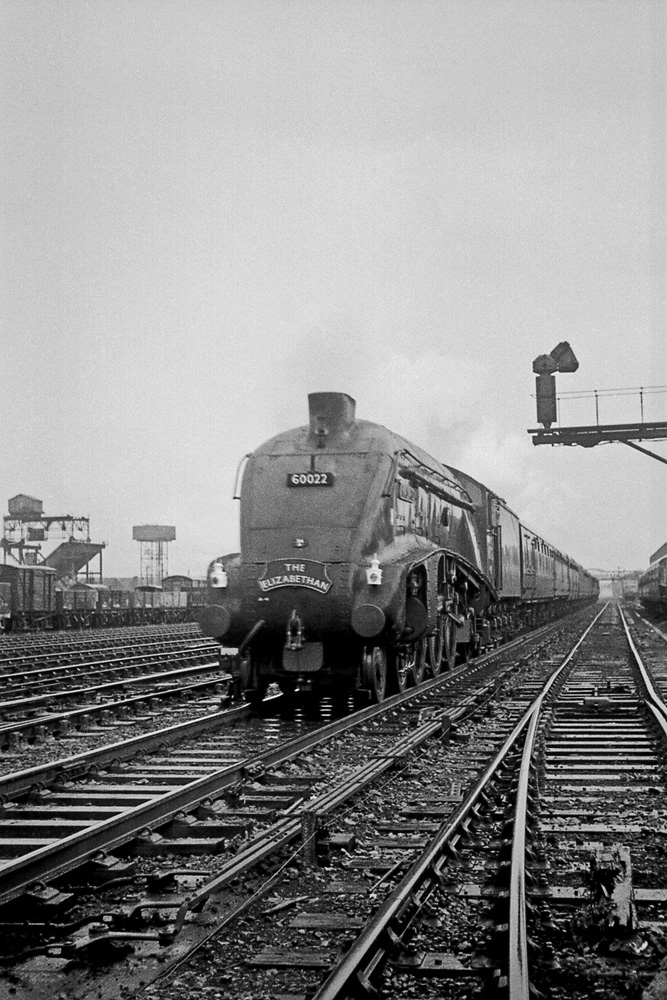
Mallard passes Darlington with the last steam hauled northbound run of the Elizabethan in September 1961.

In 1953, the summer-only, non-stop Capitals Limited express train was renamed The Elizabethan by British Railways to mark the coronation of Queen Elizabeth II. The initial service, which at the time, was the longest scheduled non-stop railway journey in the world, took 6hrs 45mins but this was reduced a year later by 15mins in 1954. This gave an average speed of just over 60 mph (97 km/h); which was regarded as a creditable achievement for the UK rail infrastructure in the postwar era.

In 1954, the film Elizabethan Express was made by British Transport Films to advertise and promote the train. Starting at King's Cross, the film showed off the high standard onboard such as catering and passenger comforts while also capturing the hard work of the train crew and the hospitality staff onboard the LNER Class A4 steam locomotive as it ran non stop from London to Edinburgh. Scenes included the engine running through water troughs (about (11,000 imperial gallons (50,000 L) was needed by the locomotive per run), changing drivers, kitchen staff preparing meals, sorting mail in the goods carriage, and the work of the BR station staff. The film is still highly regarded for its well-filmed sequences by cinematographer Billy Williams capturing the full speed Gresley A4 on the East Coast main line. It was narrated by Howard Marion Crawford and Alan Wheatley

Steam haulage of The Elizabethan came to an end on 8 September 1961 when they were replaced by British Rail Class 47 diesel units. On the final day of steam, the northbound service was hauled by No 60022 Mallard, which was (and remains) the holder of the world speed record for steam.

British Railways withdrew The Elizabethan non-stop service in 1963.
