= Terminus (1961 film) =

1961 British transport film documentary by John Schlesinger

- Opening titles
- Directed by: John Schlesinger
- Produced by: Edgar Anstey
- Music by: Ron Grainer
- Production company: British Transport Films
- Release date: 1961
- Running time: 33 minutes
- Country: United Kingdom
- Language: English

Terminus is a 33-minute 1961 British Transport Film documentary (filmed in August 1960) directed by John Schlesinger which presents a 'fly-on-the-wall' look at an ordinary day at Waterloo station in London. Along with most British Transport Films of the period, it was produced by Edgar Anstey. It was nominated for a BAFTA Film Award for Best Documentary and, for a time, the Academy Award for Best Documentary Feature, before being disqualified after it was discovered that the film was first released before the eligibility period. Original music was by Ron Grainer.

== Content ==
The film covers both staff and passengers around the station. The trains are still pulled by steam locomotives.

The most unusual section is the enquiry centre: some two dozen people taking telephone calls with questions about travel.

The boat-train "Pretoria Castle" arrives and passengers are greeted by friends. A group of prisoners, handcuffed in pairs, are placed in a carriage whilst the general public are held back by police. The lost property office is filled with umbrellas. A coffin is placed in the guard van. A large group of Jamaicans board the train to Southampton.

A young boy, Matthew Perry, is traumatised as the police take him to the station master's office where an announcement is made for his mother to collect him.

The station announcer knits between public information announcement over the station tannoy.

A businessman just misses his train and pays a visit to the crowded station buffet for a beer.

Late at night girls drink Kia-Ora and sailors smoke cigarettes. Some travellers sleep on benches. A homeless bag-lady wanders aimlessly, checking rubbish bins for food.

== Production ==
Many of the supposedly reportage shots were staged. Schlesinger makes a cameo appearance as a passing, umbrella-carrying business man, and a tearful and apparently lost child, Matthew Perry, was temporarily abandoned deliberately by his mother Margaret Ashcroft, an actress relative of Schlesinger. Some other people appearing were also actors, including handcuffed convicts and a confused elderly woman.
