= John Hawkesworth =

John Hawkesworth may refer to:

- John Hawkesworth (book editor) (c. 1715–1773), English writer and book editor
- John Hawkesworth (British Army officer) (1893–1945), British Army Lieutenant-General
- John Hawkesworth (producer) (1920–2003), English television producer and script writer
- Johnny Hawksworth (1924–2009), British musician and composer
