= John Greenwood (composer) =

English composer (1889–1975)

John Danforth Herman Greenwood (26 June 1889 – 15 April 1975), was an English composer best known for his film scores.

== Education and early career ==
Greenwood was the son of New Zealander Alfred Greenwood (1842–1912) and his English-born wife Ottilie Rose Minna (1855–1932) née Schweitzer. He was named after his grandfathers: Herman Schweitzer, a Prussian born analytical chemist; and Dr. John Danforth Greenwood (1803–1890) from Sussex, England, a pioneering New Zealand physician and educationist, who had emigrated to New Zealand in 1842 after retiring from medicine due to ill health. Greenwood was born in London. He learned piano and viola from his parents and at 18 entered the Royal College of Music to study viola and horn, as well as composition with Charles Villiers Stanford. While there he won the Grove scholarship and Arthur Sullivan composition awards. For a short period he taught at Brighton and Hove Grammar School, and then made his living as a pianist, horn and viola player in various orchestras as well as conducting at the Queen's Hall and in the provinces.

During the First World War Greenwood was a conscientious objector. At that time he was living at 39, Hillcrest Road, Acton Hill. Greenwood married Winifred Margaret Hicks in 1917 and a son, Alfred Michael Greenwood, was born a year later.

== Composer ==
Greenwood's early concert works had their first performances from the Queen's Hall Orchestra under Henry Wood in the early 1920s. But he quickly became involved with writing music for the cinema, composing and editing music for silent films from the 1920s onwards. In 1929 he wrote a new score for the part-talkie film To What Red Hell. From the 1930s until the mid-1950s he worked on around 50 films, from Man of Aran (1934) to Grand National Night (1953). While he no doubt gained considerable satisfaction from these compositions – and access to a large audience – there were also frustrations as the film editing process frequently required the removal or addition of passages of music quite regardless of the overall form and themes of the piece.

Whether his compositions of incidental theatre music for Shakespeare's Merchant of Venice and A Midsummer Night's Dream (as staged by J.B. Fagan) were intrinsically more satisfying is not known. A Fantasy was extracted from A Midsummer Night's Dream and performed separately.

His film credits also include scores for documentaries such as Berth 24 (1950), portraying the life of the Hull docks, and The Lake District (1954), with narration by Michael Redgrave. His march The Eighth Army (from the film The Nine Men) written with Eric Coates, was recorded on 78.

The concert works, composed in parallel with his work for film and theatre, are now entirely forgotten. Salute to Gustav Holst was premiered at the Sir Henry Wood Promenade Concerts in 1936, conducted by the composer. His setting of Psalm 150 for chorus and orchestra was broadcast in May 1936, conducted by Adrian Boult. On 24 January 1938 Constant Lambert conducted the BBC Orchestra in the first performance and broadcast of Greenwood's Symphonic Movement.

The Piano Quintet, composed around 1940, was performed by the Aeolian String Quartet and Kyla Greenbaum on 15 October 1953 at Queen Mary Hall, Great Russell Street, as part of a chamber concert that also included the String Quartet No 2 (1928) and the Flute Sonata (1943). On 14 September 1956 his Viola Concerto received its world premiere at the Proms, with Watson Forbes as the soloist, conducted by John Hollingsworth.

The composer's archives, held at McMaster University, contain documentation (including some manuscripts) of two symphonies, three piano sonatas and two orchestral ballet suites (The Silver Harlequin, 1917 and Piccadilly, 1953).

== Later life ==
By the 1930s he was living at Roedean, Brighton. During the Second World War he worked on the staff of the BBC European Service as Assistant Music Supervisor. By the early 1950s, as his work on films drew to a close, he was living at Greenwoods, North End, Ditchling in Sussex. In 1969 his address was Guntsfield, 32 Beacon Road, Ditchling. He died at Ditchling, aged 85.

== Filmography ==
- The Lake District (1954)
- Grand National Night (1953) a.k.a. Wicked Wife (USA)
- The Gentle Gunman (1952)
- Another Man's Poison (1952)
- Family Portrait (1950) a.k.a. A Film on the Theme of the Festival of Britain 1951 (UK: subtitle)
- Trio (1950)
- Berth 24 (1950)
- The Lost People (1949)
- The Last Days of Dolwyn (1949) a.k.a. Dolwyn; a.k.a. Women of Dolwyn (USA)
- Quartet (1949)
- Eureka Stockade (1949) a.k.a. Massacre Hill
- Broken Journey (1948)
- School for Danger (1947)
- Frieda (1947)
- Hungry Hill (1947)
- They Knew Mr. Knight (1946)
- Painted Boats (1945) a.k.a. The Girl of the Canal (USA)
- San Demetrio London (1943)
- The Lamp Still Burns (1943)
- The Gentle Sex (1943)
- Nine Men (1943)
- A.1. at Lloyds (British Council documentary, 1942)
- 'Pimpernel' Smith (1941) a.k.a. Mister V (USA: reissue title); a.k.a. The Fighting Pimpernel
- Contraband (1940) a.k.a. Blackout (USA) (with Richard Addinsell)
- 21 Days (1940)
- Prison Without Bars (1938)
- The Drum (1938) a.k.a. Drums (USA)
- Elephant Boy (1937)
- Secret Agent (1936) (uncredited)
- East Meets West (with Louis Levy)
- The Invader (1935) a.k.a. An Old Spanish Custom
- Man of Aran (1934)
- The Constant Nymph (1933) (with Eugene Goossens)
- Alibi (1931)
- The Sleeping Cardinal (1931)
- Stranglehold (1931)
- At the Villa Rosa (1930)
- To What Red Hell (1929)

== Bibliography ==
- Everyman's Dictionary of Music 5th Edition, 1975. ISBN 0-460-03022-1
