= List of films set on trains =

This is a list of films set on trains.

== List ==
Title	Year	Studio
3 for Bedroom C	1952	
The 15:17 to Paris	2018	
27 Down	1974	
96 Minutes	2025	
Aces Go Places 3	1984	
Alienoid: Return to the Future	2024	
Atomic Train	1999	
Avalanche Express	1979	
Avanti!	1972	
Back To The Future Part III	1990	Universal Pictures
Bebert and the train	1963	
Before Sunrise	1995	
La Bête Humaine	1938	
Beyond the Door III	1989	
Born to Kill	1947	
Boxcar Bertha	1972	
Breakheart Pass	1975	
Broadway Limited	1941	
Broken Arrow	1996	
Bullet to Beijing	1995	
Bullet Train	2022	
Bullet Train Explosion	2025	
By Whose Hand?	1932	
Cairo Station	1958	
Caught on a Train	1980	
Chattanooga Choo Choo	1984	
Chennai Express	2013	
Child 44	2015	
The Cassandra Crossing	1976	
Cold War 2	2016	
The Commuter	2018	
Compartment No. 6	2021	
Dadar Kirti	1980	
Danger Lights	1930	
The Darjeeling Limited	2007	
Dark of the Sun	1968	
Dark Phoenix	2019	
The Day of the Roses	1998	
Death, Deceit and Destiny Aboard the Orient Express	2000	
Death Train	1993	
Death Train	2003	
Demon Slayer: Kimetsu no Yaiba the Movie: Mugen Train	2020	
Denver & Rio Grande	1952	
Derailed	2002	
Disaster on the Coastliner	1979	
Divergent	2014	
The Divergent Series: Insurgent	2015	
Down to Earth	1947	
Drag Me to Hell	2009	
Dr. Terror's House of Horrors	1965	
The Edge	2010	
Ekk Deewana Tha	2012	
Enthiran	2010	Sun Pictures
End of the Line	1987	
Emperor of the North Pole	1973	
The Equalizer 2	2018	
Europa	1991	
The Expendables 3	2014	
Fast Five	2011	
Finders Keepers	1984	
Final Destination 3	2006	
Flashback	1990	
The Bullet Train	1975	
The Burning Train	1980	
The First Great Train Robbery	1979	
The Five Man Army	1969	
French Kiss	1995	
From Russia With Love	1963	
Florida Special	1936	
Frequencies	2013	
The Flying Scotsman	1929	
The General	1926	
The Ghost Train	1941	
The Girl on the Train	2016	
Go West (Marx Bros.)	1940	
GoldenEye	1995	
Gold Train	1965	
The Great K & A Train Robbery	1926	
The Great Locomotive Chase	1956	Walt Disney Pictures
The Great St Trinian's Train Robbery	1966	
The Great Train Robbery	1903	
The Greatest Show on Earth	1952	
The Grey Fox	1982	
Grifters	1990	
The Harvey Girls	1946	
The Head Vanishes	2016	
Home on the Range	2004	
Horror Express	1973	
Howl	2015	
Human Desire	1954	
The Hunger Games: Catching Fire	2013	
The Hunger Games: The Ballad of Songbirds & Snakes	2023	
In Old Oklahoma	1943	
In the Heat of the Night	1967	
It Happened to Jane	1959	
The Incident	1967	
The Journey of Natty Gann	1985	Walt Disney Pictures
Kamen Rider Gotchard: The Future Daybreak	2024	
Kamen Rider Zero-One the Movie: Real×Time	2020	
Kereta Hantu Manggarai	2008	
Kereta Setan Manggarai	2008	
Kill	2024	Dharma Productions
Knowing	2009	
The Lady Vanishes	1938	
The Lady Vanishes	1979	
The Lady Vanishes	2013	
The Last Journey	1936	
Last Passenger	2013	
Last Stop on the Night Train	1975	
Leave Her to Heaven	1945	
Der letzte Zug	2006	
The Lone Ranger	2013	
Madagascar	2005	
Madagascar 3: Europe's Most Wanted	2012	
Maze Runner: The Death Cure	2018	
The Midnight Meat Train	2008	
Milky Subway: The Galactic Limited Express - the Movie	2026	
Minder on the Orient Express	1985	
Mission: Impossible	1996	
Mission: Impossible – Dead Reckoning Part One	2023	
Moebius	1996	
The Molly Maguires	1970	
Money Train	1995	Columbia Pictures
Moscow Mission	2023	
Mr. Nobody	2009	
Mrs. O'Malley and Mr. Malone	1950	
Muppets Most Wanted	2014	
Murder in the Private Car	1934	
Murder on the Orient Express	1974	
Murder on the Orient Express	2001	
Murder on the Orient Express	2017	
My Little Chickadee	1940	
The Mystery Train	1931	
Mystery Train	1989	
The Narrow Margin	1952	
Narrow Margin	1990	
Nayak	1966	
Ned Kelly	2003	
Night Mail	1936	
Night on the Galactic Railroad	1985	
Night Passage	1957	
Night Train	1959	
Night Train	2009	
Night Train to Lisbon	2013	
Night Train to Munich	1940	
Night Train to Paris	1964	
Night Train to Terror	1985	
Night Train to Venice	1996	
North by Northwest	1959	
North West Frontier	1959	
Number Seventeen	1932	
Oh, Mr Porter!	1937	
Once Upon a Time in the West	1968	
Orient Express	1927	
Orient Express	1934	
Our Hospitality	1923	
The Palm Beach Story	1942	
Pee-wee's Big Adventure	1985	
Pets on a Train	2025	
Praktan	2016	
Phantom Express	1932	
The Polar Express	2004	
Poppoya	1999	
Posse	1975	
Priest	2011	
Ra.One	2011	Eros International; Red Chillies Entertainment
The Railrodder	1965	
Railway Guerrilla	1956	
Railway Heroes	2021	
The Railway Man	2013	
The Rebel Set	1959	
Rapture	1965	
Red Silk	2025	
Rhinegold	1978	
Ripley's Game	2002	
Rome Express	1932	
Rome Express	1950	
Run All Night	2015	
Runaway!	1973	
Runaway Train	1985	
Santa Fe	1951	
Santa Fe Trail	1940	
Search and Destroy	2020	
Seconds	1966	
Seconds to Spare	2002	
Shadow of a Doubt	1943	
Shanghai Express	1932	
Sherlock Holmes in Washington	1943	
Shinkansen Henkei Robo Shinkalion the Movie: The Marvelous Fast ALFA-X That Comes From The Future	2019	
Shoah	1985	
Shock Wave 2	2020	
Sholay	1975	
The Silent Passenger	1935	
Silver Streak	1934	
Silver Streak	1976	20th Century Fox
Sleep, My Love	1948	
Sleepers West	1941	
Sleeping Car	1933	
Sleeping Car to Trieste	1948	
Snakes on a Train	2006	
Snow	1963	
Snowpiercer	2013	
Some Like It Hot	1959	
Source Code	2011	
Spirit: Stallion of the Cimarron	2002	
Stand by Me	1986	
The Station Agent	2003	
The Sting	1973	
Strangers on a Train	1951	
Streamline Express	1935	
Super 8	2011	
Supercop 2	1993	
Switchback	1997	
The 39 Steps	1935	
The Taking of Pelham 123	2009	
The Taking of Pelham One Two Three	1974	
The Tall Target	1951	
Terror by Night	1946	
Terror Train	1980	
Tezz	2012	
This Gun for Hire	1942	
A Ticket to Tomahawk	1950	
Thomas and the Magic Railroad	2000	
Throw Momma from the Train	1987	
The Titfield Thunderbolt	1953	
Tomica Hero: Rescue Force Explosive Movie: Rescue the Mach Train!	2008	
Tough Guys	1986	
Tourist train	1933	
The Ghost and the Darkness	1996	
Tragedi Bintaro	1989	
The Train	1964	
The Train	1970	
The Train	1973	
Train	2008	
Train of Events	1949	
Train of Life	1998	
The Train Robbers	1973	
Train to Busan	2016	
Trans-Europ-Express	1966	
Trading Places	1983	
TransSiberian	2008	
Twisted Rails	1934	
Twentieth Century	1934	
Under Siege 2: Dark Territory	1995	
Union Pacific	1939	
Unstoppable	2010	
Von Ryan's Express	1965	20th Century Fox
Vinnaithaandi Varuvaayaa	2010	
The Water Diviner	2014	
Where the Hell's That Gold?	1988	CBS
The White Storm 2: Drug Lords	2019	
Wild Seed	1966	
The Wind in the Willows	1983	
Ye Maaya Chesave	2010	
Stop! That! Train!	2026	
