= Robbie (film) =

- Directed by: Ronald Dunkley
- Written by: Ronald Dunkley
- Produced by: James Ritchie
- Cinematography: Ronald Craigen
- Edited by: Richard Best
- Distributed by: British Transport Films
- Release date: 1979
- Country: United Kingdom

Robbie is a 13-minute-long film made by British Transport Films in 1979 and revised in 1986. Although it is not strictly a Public Information Film, it is often considered to be so by fans of the genre. The film, which was shown in schools all over Great Britain, is centred around a young boy suffering a disfiguring and/or fatal accident when he trespasses on a railway line, with three different versions being made to demonstrate the dangers of both electrified and non-electrified lines.

When it was first released, all three versions were narrated and introduced by Peter Purves, later replaced by Keith Chegwin when the films were revised. Robbie was written and directed by Ronald Dunkley and produced by James Ritchie. It was a replacement for the controversial and extremely graphic The Finishing Line, and was itself later replaced by a more modern film called Killing Time.

== Plot ==
All three variants of the film show Robbie, a young boy of about 8 years old with a keen interest in both trains and football, being persuaded by his elder brother Bert to climb through a hole in the fence surrounding a nearby railway line and go onto the track. His elder sister Sally and his friend Jake join in. The three different editions continue as follows:

- Version 1 (non-electrified railway lines): As Robbie crosses the railway line, Jake falls over on the track. Robbie goes back to help him off the track and he puts his football boots down to help Jake up, which then get stuck in the tracks. Robbie tries to pull the boots free, albeit in vain. We then hear and see a train approaching. The shoelace then pops and Robbie stumbles back in time, but trips on the other tracks; whilst Robbie tries to free his feet off the track we then hear and see another train approaching.
- Version 2 (overhead electric line): To encourage Robbie to cross the train tracks Robbie's brother Bert snatches Robbie's football boots and throws them to the other side of the track. Unfortunately they get caught on the overhead electric line and when Robbie tries to retrieve them with a long metal pole he is electrocuted.
- Version 3 (third rail electrified line): Robbie accidentally steps on the electrified third rail and is electrocuted.

In the next scene, Robbie's mother Ruth is informed that Robbie has been seriously injured, and has had to have both feet amputated. The cause of the injury is not mentioned, because it is different in all three variants. The film ends with a disfigured Robbie using a wheelchair. He is watching some other children play football, with a commentary by the narrator about how he will never be able to play again. The final shot is of his football boots, which he will now never need again, hanging up on the back of his bedroom door at home.

== Cast ==
- Robin Crane as Robbie
- Deborah Norton as Ruth
- Peter Bolt as Bert
- Gary Forbes as Jake
- Alison Bond as Sally
- Matthew Roberton as P.C.
- Philippa Howell as W.P.C.

== Trains used in the film ==
- GWR 6000 Class 6000 "King George V"
- British Rail Class 43 HST
- British Rail Class 55 "Deltic"
- Advanced Passenger Train (British Rail Class 370)
