= John Schlesinger =

English film and theatre director (1926–2003)

John Schlesinger CBE
- Schlesinger in 1974
- Born: John Richard Schlesinger; 16 February 1926; London, England
- Died: 25 July 2003 (aged 77); Palm Springs, California, U.S.
- Education: Balliol College, Oxford
- Occupations: Director; actor
- Partner: Michael Childers

John Richard Schlesinger (/ˈʃlɛsɪndʒər/ SHLESS-in-jər; 16 February 1926 – 25 July 2003) was an English film, television and theatre director, and actor. He emerged in the early 1960s as a leading light of the British New Wave, before embarking on a successful career in Hollywood, often directing films dealing with provocative subject matter, combined with his status as one of the rare openly gay directors working in mainstream films.

Schlesinger started his career making British kitchen sink dramas A Kind of Loving (1962) and Billy Liar (1963), and the Thomas Hardy adaptation Far from the Madding Crowd (1967). He won the Academy Award for Best Director for Midnight Cowboy (1969) and was Oscar-nominated for Darling (1965) and Sunday Bloody Sunday (1971). He gained acclaim for his Hollywood films The Day of the Locust (1975) and Marathon Man (1976). His later films include Madame Sousatzka (1988) and Cold Comfort Farm (1995). He also served as an associate director of the Royal National Theatre.

Over his career he received numerous accolades including an Academy Award, four BAFTAs, and a Golden Globe. His honours include the Commander of the Order of the British Empire (CBE), and a BAFTA Fellow. Four of Schlesinger's films are on the British Film Institute's Top 100 British films.

== Life and career ==
=== Early years and education ===
Schlesinger was born and raised in Hampstead, London, in a Jewish family, the eldest of five children of distinguished Emmanuel College, Cambridge–educated paediatrician and physician Bernard Edward Schlesinger OBE FRCP (1896–1984), who had also served in the Royal Army Medical Corps as a brigadier, and his wife Winifred Henrietta, daughter of Hermann Regensburg, a stockbroker from Frankfurt. She had left school at 14 to study at the Trinity College of Music, and later studied languages at the University of Oxford for three years. Bernard Schlesinger's father Richard, a stockbroker, had come to England in the 1880s from Frankfurt.

After St Edmund's School, Hindhead and Uppingham School (where his father had also been), Schlesinger enlisted in the British Army during World War II. While serving with the Royal Engineers, he made films on the war's front line. He also entertained his fellow troops by performing magic tricks. After his tour of duty, he continued making short films and acted in stage productions while studying at Balliol College, Oxford, where he was involved in the Oxford University Dramatic Society.

=== Career ===
Schlesinger's acting career began in the 1950s and consisted of supporting roles in British films such as The Divided Heart and Oh... Rosalinda!!, and British television productions such as BBC Sunday Night Theatre, The Adventures of Robin Hood and The Vise. He began his directorial career in 1956 with the short documentary Sunday in the Park about London's Hyde Park. In 1958, Schlesinger created a documentary on Benjamin Britten and the Aldeburgh Festival for the BBC's Monitor TV programme, including rehearsals of the children's opera Noye's Fludde featuring a young Michael Crawford. In 1959, Schlesinger was credited as exterior or second unit director on 23 episodes of the TV series The Four Just Men and four 30-minute episodes of the series Danger Man. He also appeared in Col March of Scotland Yard as "Dutch cook" in "Death and the Other Monkey" 1956.

By the 1960s, he had virtually given up acting to concentrate on a directing career, and another of his earlier directorial efforts, the British Transport Films' documentary Terminus (1961), gained a Venice Film Festival Gold Lion and a British Academy Award. His first two fiction films, A Kind of Loving (1962) and Billy Liar (1963) were set in the North of England. Both were produced by Joseph Janni and financed by Nat Cohen. A Kind of Loving won the Golden Bear award at the 12th Berlin International Film Festival in 1962. His third feature film, Darling (1965), tartly described the modern way of life in London and was one of the first films about 'swinging London'. Schlesinger's next film was the period drama Far from the Madding Crowd (1967), an adaptation of Thomas Hardy's popular novel accentuated by beautiful English country locations. Both films (and Billy Liar) featured Julie Christie as the female lead.

Schlesinger's next film, Midnight Cowboy (1969), was internationally acclaimed. A story of two hustlers living on the fringe in the bad side of New York City, it was Schlesinger's first film shot in the US, and it won Oscars for Best Director and Best Picture. The film was one of the earliest mainstream American films to deal explicitly with homosexual relationships, and is considered a groundbreaking work of queer cinema. However, according to actor Dustin Hoffman, at a preview screening of the film "people walked out in droves" after seeing a male student go down on the male main character in a Times Square grindhouse. "We thought this could end everybody's career," said Hoffman.

During the 1970s, Schlesinger made an array of films that were mainly about loners, losers and people outside the mainstream world, such as Sunday Bloody Sunday (1971), The Day of the Locust (1975), Marathon Man (1976) and Yanks (1979). Later, came the major box office and critical failure of Honky Tonk Freeway (1981), followed by films that attracted mixed responses from the public, and low returns, although The Falcon and the Snowman (1985) made money and Pacific Heights (1990) was a box-office hit. In Britain, he did better with films like Madame Sousatzka (1988) and the television film Cold Comfort Farm (1995). Other later works include plays for television An Englishman Abroad (1983) and A Question of Attribution (1991), both with scripts by Alan Bennett, The Innocent (1993) and The Next Best Thing (2000).

Schlesinger directed on stage Timon of Athens (1965) for the Royal Shakespeare Company and the musical I and Albert (1972) at London's Piccadilly Theatre. From 1973, he was an associate director of the Royal National Theatre, where he produced George Bernard Shaw's Heartbreak House (1975). He directed several operas, including Les contes d'Hoffmann (1980) and Der Rosenkavalier (1984), both at Covent Garden.

Schlesinger directed The Journey, a party political broadcast for the Conservative Party in the general election of 1992, which featured Prime Minister John Major returning to Brixton in south London, thus highlighting Major's humble background, something atypical for a Conservative politician at that time. Schlesinger said he had voted for all three main political parties in the UK at one time or another.

=== Later years and death ===
In 1991, Schlesinger made a brief return to acting, portraying the gay character 'Derek' in the TV adaptation of The Lost Language of Cranes for the BBC. Schlesinger had himself come out during the making of Midnight Cowboy.

Schlesinger was appointed Commander of the Order of the British Empire (CBE) in the 1970 Birthday Honours for services to film. Maintaining a flat in London and house at Palm Springs, California Schlesinger had a Golden Palm Star on the Palm Springs Walk of Stars dedicated to him in January 2003, which was his final public appearance.

Schlesinger underwent a quadruple heart bypass in 1998, before suffering a stroke on New Year's Day 2001, which substantially diminished his faculties. He died at Desert Regional Medical Center in Palm Springs on the morning of 25 July 2003, aged 77.

A memorial service was held on 30 September 2003. He was cremated, with most of his ashes interred next to his parents and the remainder left to be interred with Childers.

== Filmography ==
=== Film ===
Year	Title	Director	Writer	Producer	Note
1952	The Starfish	Yes	Yes	Uncredited	Co-directed with Alan Cooke
1962	A Kind of Loving	Yes	No	No	
1963	Billy Liar	Yes	No	No	
1965	Darling	Yes	Story	No	
1967	Far From the Madding Crowd	Yes	No	No	
1969	Midnight Cowboy	Yes	No	No	
1971	Sunday Bloody Sunday	Yes	Uncredited	No	
1975	The Day of the Locust	Yes	No	No	
1976	Marathon Man	Yes	No	No	
1979	Yanks	Yes	No	No	
1981	Honky Tonk Freeway	Yes	No	No	
1985	The Falcon and the Snowman	Yes	No	Yes	
1987	The Believers	Yes	No	Yes	
1988	Madame Sousatzka	Yes	Yes	No	
1990	Pacific Heights	Yes	No	No	
1993	The Innocent	Yes	No	No	
1996	Eye for an Eye	Yes	No	No	
2000	The Next Best Thing	Yes	No	No	

Documentary film

- Israel: A Right to Live (1967)

Documentary short

Year	Title	Director	Writer	Producer	Notes
1956	Sunday in the Park	Yes	No	Yes	Also cinematographer
1961	Terminus	Yes	Yes	No	Also appeared as a passenger (Uncredited)
1973	The Longest	Yes	No	No	Segment of Visions of Eight

=== Television ===
Year	Title	Notes
1960–1963	The Valiant Years	
1958–1961	Monitor	4 episodes
1967	The Wednesday Play	Episode: "Days in the Trees" (Original Royal Shakespeare Company stage production)
1983	An Englishman Abroad	TV film
1983	HBO Theatre	Episode: Separate Tables
1991	Screen One	Episode: "A Question of Attribution"
1995	Cold Comfort Farm	TV film
1997	The Tale of Sweeney Todd	TV film

== Accolades and honours ==
He was twice nominated for the Venice Film Festival's Golden Lion, and was recipient of the Directors Guild of Great Britain's Lifetime Achievement Award. In the 1970 Birthday Honours, he was appointed Commander of the Order of the British Empire (CBE) for services to film. In 1981, the Hamburg-based Alfred Toepfer Foundation awarded Schlesinger its annual Shakespeare Prize in recognition of his life's work. In 1996 he was made a BAFTA Fellow.

Academy Awards

Year	Title	Category	Result
1965	Darling	Best Director	Nominated
1969	Midnight Cowboy	Best Director	Won
1971	Sunday Bloody Sunday	Best Director	Nominated

BAFTA Awards

Year	Title	Category	Result
1961	Terminus	Best Short Film	Won
1965	Darling	Best British Film	Nominated
1969	Midnight Cowboy	Best Direction	Won
1971	Sunday Bloody Sunday	Best Direction	Won
1979	Yanks	Best Direction	Nominated
1983	An Englishman Abroad	Best Single Drama	Won
1991	A Question of Attribution	Best Single Drama	Won
1996	BAFTA Fellowship		Won

Golden Globe Awards

Year	Title	Category	Result
1965	Darling	Best Director	Nominated
1969	Midnight Cowboy	Best Director	Won
1976	Marathon Man	Best Director	Nominated

Awards and nominations received by Schlesinger's films
Year	Title	Academy Awards		BAFTA Awards		Golden Globe Awards	
Year	Title	Nominations	Wins	Nominations	Wins	Nominations	Wins
1962	A Kind of Loving			4			
1963	Billy Liar			6			
1965	Darling	5	3	6	4	3	1
1967	Far from the Madding Crowd	1		2		3	
1969	Midnight Cowboy	7	3	7	6	7	1
1971	Sunday Bloody Sunday	4		8	5	2	1
1975	The Day of the Locust	2		3	1	2	
1976	Marathon Man	1		2		5	1
1979	Yanks			7	2	2	
1988	Madame Sousatzka			1		2	1
Total		20	6	46	18	26	5

Directed Academy Award performances

Under Schlesinger's direction, these actors have received the Academy Award nominations and wins for their performances in their respective roles.

Year	Performer	Film	Result
Academy Award for Best Actor
1970	Dustin Hoffman	Midnight Cowboy	Nominated
1970	Jon Voight	Midnight Cowboy	Nominated
1972	Peter Finch	Sunday Bloody Sunday	Nominated
Academy Award for Best Supporting Actor
1976	Burgess Meredith	The Day of the Locust	Nominated
1977	Laurence Olivier	Marathon Man	Nominated
Academy Award for Best Actress
1966	Julie Christie	Darling	Won
1972	Glenda Jackson	Sunday Bloody Sunday	Nominated
Academy Award for Best Supporting Actress
1970	Sylvia Miles	Midnight Cowboy	Nominated

== See also ==
- List of British film directors
- List of Academy Award winners and nominees from Great Britain – Best Director
- List of LGBTQ Academy Award winners and nominees for Best Director
- List of Golden Globe winners

== Sources ==
- Mann, William J. (2004). Edge of Midnight: The Life of John Schlesinger. London: Hutchinson. ISBN 978-0091794897
