= Berth 24 =

1950 British documentary by J. B. Holmes

- Directed by: J.B. Holmes
- Screenplay by: Montagu Slater
- Produced by: Edgar Anstey
- Starring: William Devlin; Richard Huson
- Cinematography: Ronald Craigen
- Edited by: Stewart McAllister
- Music by: John Greenwood
- Release date: 1950
- Running time: 44 minutes
- Country: United Kingdom
- Language: English

Berth 24 (also known as Hull Docks; re-released as Dockers at Work) is a 1950 British documentary film produced by British Transport Films and directed by J. B. Holmes. The screenplay was by Montagu Slater. The musical score is by John Greenwood. The film concerns Hull Docks and specifically the unloading and reloading of a ship, the SS Bravo, heading back to Gothenburg. The 44-minute original was somewhat long in its capacity as a "filler" between feature films in the days when a ticket bought an A movie and a B-movie; it was re-released in 1953 as a 15-minute film entitled Dockers at Work.

It was broadcast in the UK on 25 February 2021 on Talking Pictures TV.

== Overview ==
The film begins with two officials in an office overlooking the dock, deciding the logistics of getting a new ship berthed in the busy dock. Unloading must be co-ordinated with the arrival of a freight train which must be directed to the correcting siding in the docks.

The ship is emptied of its huge cargo of timber and grain. The grain is shown being pushed by below deck "ploughmen" who use huge paddles to push the grain into the central device from which it is sucked out of the ship and over to the grain elevator on the docks.

A prize bull makes its way from the farm to the dockyard. It is hoisted into the hold then pulled by the ring in its nose into a small pen.

The ship hoists the Blue Peter flag showing it is ready to leave and stevedores manhandle the final large crates in the hold o optimise space. More lorry-loads of goods arrive. They keep loading until the ship is scheduled to leave i.e. if a lorry is late it leaves without those goods rather than wait.

Time to leave counts down. Tarpaulins are pulled over the holds and the crew leave. A tug appears to guide the ship out of the dock.

The dockside warehouse is empty. The tug heads back into harbour as the Bravo leaves the estuary into the North Sea. The pilot heads back to his ship.

== Cast ==
- William Devlin as reader of verses
- Richard Huson as Swedish man
- Hull dock employees as themselves

== Ships featured ==
- SS Bravo, registered in Hull
- SS Angelo
- SS Kitty

== Reception ==
The Monthly Film Bulletin wrote: "Skilful though it is, it seems less an achievement in its own right than a rather laboured pastiche of British documentary traditions founded in the G.P.O. period. ... Montagu Slater's script and J. B. Holmes' direction are admirable: the writing is discreet and unforced, the treatment well paced. But is not the inspiration of the whole film synthetic? The characterisation of the foreman docker is never false but never really personal: he is just a correct type. The lyrical set-pieces are not unpleasing, but they lack depth of feeling. The final sequence of the dockers working against time to load the ship, though carefully sustained, has no real excitement. The whole film seems a correct, conscientious exercise in convention, a well-mannered sponsored film, in fact – the only qualities it lacks are freshness and personality."

Picturegoer wrote: "Interesting and well-constructed documentary dealing with the turnround of a ship in Hull. ... A Swedish passenger who is buying goods gives interesting comments on the English countryside."

== Home media ==
Berth 24 is included in the DVD British Transport Films Collection, Volume Nine, Just The Ticket. It is also part of the BFI DVD Tales from the Shipyard collection.
