= Capitals Limited =

Passenger railway service in the United Kingdom

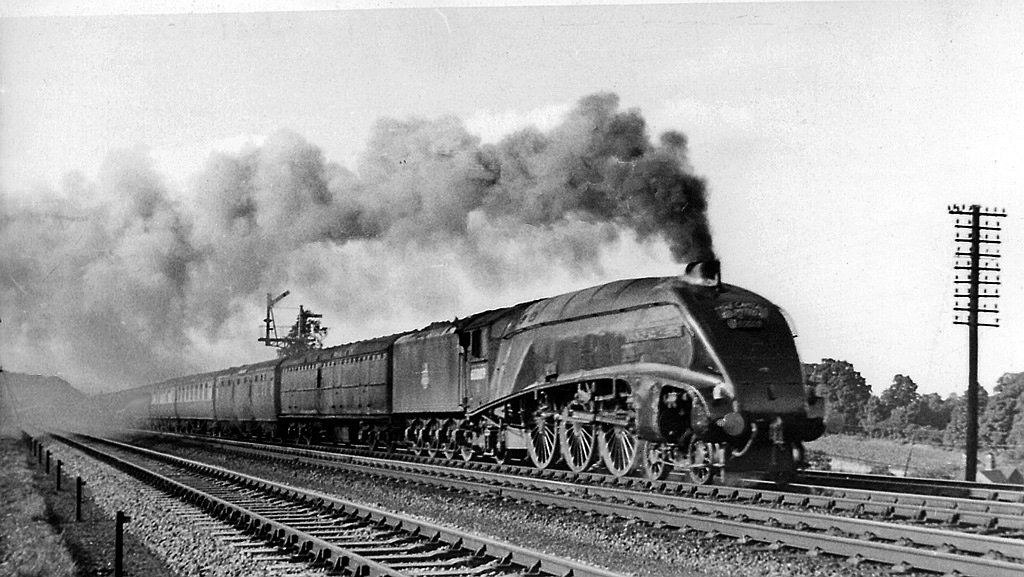
- Up Capitals Limited at Wymondley, south of Hitchin, on 8 September 1951

Overview
- Service type: Passenger train
- First service: 23 May 1949
- Last service: 1952
- Successor: Elizabethan
- Former operator(s): BR

Route
- Termini: London King’s Cross; Edinburgh Waverley, through coaches to Aberdeen
- Service frequency: Daily

The Capitals Limited was a named passenger train operating in the United Kingdom.

== History ==
After the Second World War the Flying Scotsman was re-instated as an intermediate stop train, instead of holding its former position as the non-stop London to Edinburgh service. British Rail introduced a new summer-only non-stop express called the Capitals Limited on 23 May 1949 which was scheduled to leave King's Cross at 9.30am, with the service in the return direction leaving Edinburgh at 9.45am. The journey time was 8 hours.

In 1951 the service was accelerated to offer a journey time between Edinburgh and London of 7 hours 20 minutes. In 1953, the train was renamed the Elizabethan, to mark the coronation of Queen Elizabeth II, and at the same time the journey was reduced to 6 hours 45 minutes.
