= The Finishing Line =

1977 British film by John Krish

- Opening titles
- Directed by: John Krish
- Written by: Michael Gilmour; John Krish
- Produced by: James Ritchie
- Distributed by: British Transport Films
- Release date: 1977
- Running time: 21 minutes
- Country: United Kingdom

The Finishing Line is a short film produced in 1977 by British Transport Films and directed by John Krish. It was written by Krish and Michael Gilmour. It warns about the dangers children face on railway lines. Although it is not strictly a public information film, it is often considered to be so by fans of the genre. It was broadcast in its entirety several times on television, but was so controversial that it was replaced less than two years later by the slightly less graphic Robbie (1979).

It won at least two creative awards: Certificate of Appreciation (Top Category) and Oberhausen Mention at the Festival of Youth Paris. The film was also shown in several schools by invitation.

== Plot ==
The voice-over of a headmaster tells his students that he knows that some of them have been playing on the railway, and that "the railway is not the game field". A young boy is sitting on a railway bridge wall. As the boy ponders on his thoughts, he pictures a school sports day-style event being held on the railway line. The rest of the film shows his imagined idea of what would happen, with children being split into four competitive teams to take part in different activities often carried out by young people trespassing on the railway.

Four "games" are held, in which the children are challenged to break through the fence surrounding the railway line, play a game of "chicken" with the trains and throw things at passing trains. Each time, the consequences of these activities are shown, such as one scene where a driver and passenger are left badly injured by broken glass after a child throws a brick through the train window. The final task called the "Great Tunnel Walk" is for the children to run (or leisurely stroll/fast walk) through a tunnel, but after they enter, another train approaches from the other end of the tunnel. Only four children cross the end of the tunnel, each of them having sustained serious injuries. One boy who crosses the finish line collapses as the overhead speaker announces the final results.

The film finishes as a group of adults appear and go into the tunnel to carry out the bodies of the dead and injured children, which are then laid out in a long line along the railway track. The camera pans out to show all the dead and bloodied children along the track before returning to the boy sitting on the railway bridge wall, who seems to be reconsidering the idea.

== Cast ==
- Peter Hill
- David Millett
- Jeremy Wilkin
- Kevin Flood
- Antony Carrick
- Yolande Palfrey
- David Howe
- Don Henderson

== Filming ==
It was filmed in the vicinity of the then-closed Watton-at-Stone railway station, Hertfordshire. A Class 125 DMU was used for the train as those had recently been withdrawn and were due for scrap. The bridge that the boy at the beginning and end of the film is sitting on is the southern side of the Station Rd railway bridge. The main filming area for the actors was located immediately southeast of the bridge sandwiched between Church Lane and the railway line. The "stone-throwing" competition was filmed immediately north of the railway bridge on the western side embankment where the AWS signal ramp is. The "Great Tunnel Walk" scene was filmed at Molewood Tunnel, about 3.5 mi (5.6 km) south of the current Watton-at-Stone railway station. The "start" was at the northern portal and "finish" was at the southern one.

== Reception ==
=== Controversy ===
Due to extreme public outcry, The Finishing Line was eventually withdrawn from public airing and banned for 20 years. BTF was asked by British Rail to commission and make a different film called Robbie, which was nowhere near grotesque and/or violent as The Finishing Line. The ban on The Finishing Line eventually expired in 1997, and is still regarded as a violent film.
