= John Hawksworth (economist) =

British economist (born 1963)

John Crofton Hawksworth
- Born: December 1963 (age 62); Brighton, England
- Citizenship: English
- Occupation: Economist
- Known for: Chief economist for PriceWaterhouseCoopers
- Chess career Chess career
- Country: England
- Title: International Master (1986)
- Peak rating: 2400 (January 1986)

John Crofton Hawksworth (born December 1963) is the chief economist for PriceWaterhouseCoopers in the United Kingdom.

== Early life ==
John Hawksworth was born in Brighton, England, in December 1963 to Robert Marshall Hawksworth and Norah Connor Hawksworth née Crofton. He was baptised at St Saviour's Church of England church in Pimlico, London, in 1964.

== Career ==
Hawksworth is the chief economist for PriceWaterhouseCoopers in the United Kingdom. He specialises in global macroeconomics and public policy issues, and is the editor of PWC's Economic Outlook and World in 2050 series of reports. He has worked with the Institute for Public Policy Research and the Social Market Foundation.

== Personal life ==
Hawksworth is a chess player who has taken part in a number of tournaments. He has a FIDE rating of 2355 and has been awarded the title of International Master.

== Selected publications ==
- Challenging the conventions. Public borrowing rules and housing investment: A report for the Chartered Institute of Housing. Chartered Institute of Housing, 1995. ISBN 978-0901607843
- Review of research relevant to assessing the impact of the proposed National Pension Savings Scheme on household savings. 2006. ISBN 978-1847120557

== See also ==
- Andrew Sentance
