= Geoffrey Jones =

British filmmaker (1931–2005)

Geoffrey Jones (27 November 1931 – 21 June 2005) was a British documentary film director and editor, noted for his contributions to the genre of the industrial film, and in particular British Transport Films.

== British Transport Films ==
Jones's first major work for British Transport Films was the 1963 film Snow, an eight-minute short demonstrating how the railway network coped with the 1963 "Big Freeze". Noted for its fast-paced editing and unusual photography, the film received 14 major awards upon its release and an Oscar nomination in 1965.

The success of this film led to his longer 1967 short Rail, which contrasted the final days of the steam engine with the emergence of diesel and electric power on the West and South Coast lines. This was nominated for a BAFTA Film Award in 1968. His third and final film for BTF was Locomotion, completed in 1975, a history of the railways consisting of over 400 archive artworks, films and objects edited to music.

== Other works ==
He was also involved in producing several films for the film departments of BP and Shell during the 1970s including Trinidad And Tobago, Shell Spirit and This is Shell. However, he did not complete any projects for the last 25 years of his life.

== Personal life ==
Jones married twice, having three children from his first marriage. He lived in various locations around the south of England for most of his career as a film-maker, and moved to live near Llandovery in Wales with his second wife during the 1970s.
