= Snow (1963 film) =

1963 British short film by Geoffrey Jones

- Titlescreen
- Directed by: Geoffrey Jones
- Produced by: Edgar Anstey
- Cinematography: Wolfgang Suschitzky
- Music by: Sandy Nelson; Johnny Hawksworth; Daphne Oram
- Distributed by: British Transport Films
- Release date: 1963
- Running time: 8 minutes
- Country: United Kingdom

Snow is a short documentary film made by Geoffrey Jones for British Transport Films in 1962–1963.

== Summary ==
An example of "pure cinema", the 8-minute-long film shows the efforts of British Railways staff in coping with the 1963 United Kingdom cold wave.

== Production ==
The film had its origins in primary research for a documentary about the British Railways Board. Jones' test research coincided with one of the coldest winters on record, and Jones approached BTF producer Edgar Anstey with the idea to contrast the comfort of the passengers with the efforts of the railway workmen in keeping trains going in the frozen conditions. Work began on the documentary straight after gaining approval, and Jones and cameraman Wolfgang Suschitzky travelled around the country filming scenes for the rest of the winter. The film was edited to a re-recorded version of Sandy Nelson's Teen Beat by Johnny Hawksworth, expanded to twice its original length by accelerating the tempo over the duration of the film. BBC Radiophonic Workshop composer Daphne Oram then added various effects to the soundtrack.

== Academy Award ==
The film was nominated for the Academy Award for Best Live Action Short Film at the 38th Academy Awards in 1966.

== See also ==
- Snowdrift at Bleath Gill, a 1955 film showing the efforts of British Railways workmen freeing a goods train stuck in a snowdrift on the South Durham and Lancashire Union Railway.
