= Johnny Hawksworth =

British bass player and composer (1924–2009)

- Born: Johnny Hawksworth; 2 January 1924; London, UK
- Died: 13 February 2009 (aged 85) Sydney, Australia
- Genre: Jazz
- Occupations: Musician; Composer
- Instrument: Double Bass
- Years active: 1950s-2009

Johnny Hawksworth (2 February 1924 – 13 February 2009) was a British jazz bass player and composer of library music widely used for television. He lived and worked in Australia from 1984.

== Biography ==
Born in London in 1924, Hawksworth initially trained as a pianist, but also played double bass for Britain's leading big band the Ted Heath Orchestra during the early 1950s and through the 1960s. During this time he became one of the most popular jazz bassists in the UK, winning many polls and was often featured as a soloist on Heath concerts and recordings. His album as bandleader I've Grown Accustomed to My Bass was issued in November 1964 and featured many well-known British jazz musicians, including Stan Tracey, Bill Le Sage, Tommy Whittle, Ronnie Stephenson and Terry Cox. Included were two arrangements of Bach pieces, an idea further developed in his 1968 album Johann Hawksworth Bach.

He is probably best known, however, for his short compositions for television, mostly derived from the library music he composed and performed for KPM and (from 1969) De Wolfe Music. These include Salute to Thames (the famous identity tune for Thames Television, commissioned in 1968), and also the theme tunes for the 1960s pop music show Thank Your Lucky Stars and the 1970s series Roobarb, Man About the House and George and Mildred. He also contributed some of the incidental music used in the 1967 Spider-Man cartoon. "Er Indoors", one of his compositions, saw frequent use in the Nickelodeon TV Series SpongeBob SquarePants, in which it was generally associated with avid SpongeBob fan Patchy the Pirate.

In addition to his television themes, he also worked on films, including the scores to The Naked World of Harrison Marks (1967), The Penthouse (1967), and Zeta One (1970). He also provided the hypnotic musical soundtrack to Geoffrey Jones's classic British Transport Films Snow (1963) and has composed American-style blues-based material under the name Bunny J. Browne and classically based material under the name John Steinway. Hawksworth moved to Australia in 1984 and died in Sydney in 2009 aged 85.
