= BR Standard Class 2 2-6-0 =

British steam locomotive class (1952–1967)

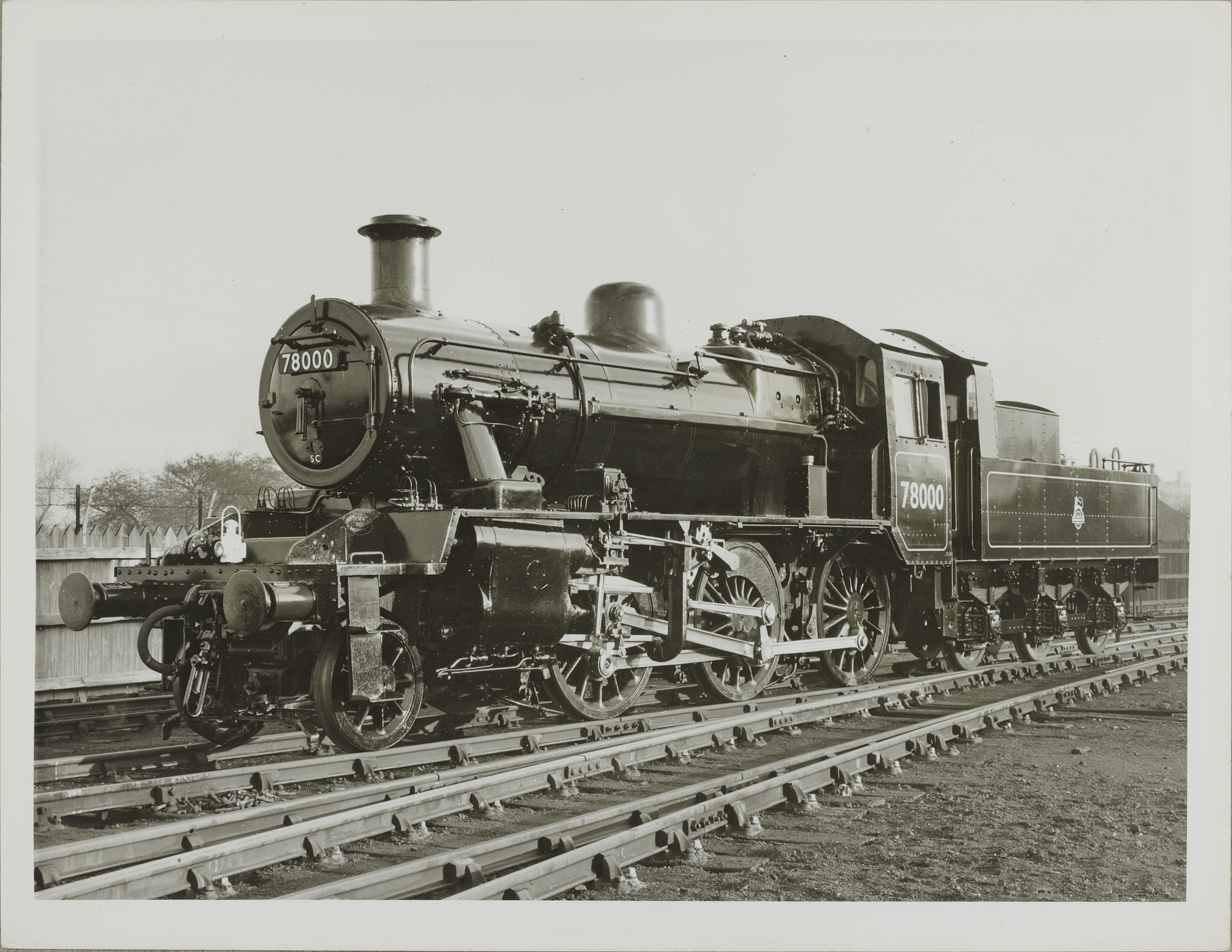
- Standard class 2 No. 78000
Type and origin
- Power type: Steam
- Designer: R. A. Riddles
- Builder: British Railways Darlington Works
- Build date: December 1952 – November 1956
- Total produced: 65
Specifications
- Configuration
  - Whyte: 2-6-0
  - UIC: 1′C h2
- Gauge: 4 ft 8 1/2 in (1,435 mm)
- Leading dia.: 3 ft 0 in (914 mm)
- Driver dia.: 5 ft 0 in (1,524 mm)
- Tender wheels: 3 ft 3 1/2 in (1,003 mm)
- Minimum curve: 4 chains (260 ft; 80 m)
- Wheelbase
  - Engine: 8 ft 6 in (2,591 mm) +; 6 ft 9 in (2,057 mm) +; 7 ft 0 in (2,134 mm) =; 22 ft 3 in (6,782 mm)
  - Tender: 6 ft 6 in (1,981 mm) +; 6 ft 6 in (1,981 mm) =; 13 ft 0 in (3,962 mm)
  - incl. tender: 44 ft 1 in (13,437 mm)
- Length
  - Over buffers: 53 ft 2 1/2 in (16,218 mm)
- Width: 8 ft 6 in (2,591 mm)
- Height: 12 ft 9 1/2 in (3,899 mm)
- Axle load: 13.75 long tons (13.97 t; 15.40 short tons)
  - Leading: 8.75 long tons (8.89 t; 9.80 short tons)
  - 1st coupled: 13.75 long tons (13.97 t; 15.40 short tons)
  - 2nd coupled: 13.60 long tons (13.82 t; 15.23 short tons)
  - 3rd coupled: 13.15 long tons (13.36 t; 14.73 short tons)
  - Tender axle: Axle 1: 13.75 long tons (13.97 t; 15.40 short tons); Axle 2: 11.80 long tons (11.99 t; 13.22 short tons); Axle 3: 11.30 long tons (11.48 t; 12.66 short tons)
- Adhesive weight: 40.50 long tons (41.15 t; 45.36 short tons)
- Loco weight: 49.25 long tons (50.04 t; 55.16 short tons)
- Tender weight: 36.85 long tons (37.44 t; 41.27 short tons)
- Total weight: 86.10 long tons (87.48 t; 96.43 short tons)
- Tender type: BR3
- Fuel type: Coal
- Fuel capacity: 4 long tons (4.1 t; 4.5 short tons)
- Water cap.: 3,000 imp gal (14,000 L; 3,600 US gal)
- Firebox
  - Type: Belpaire
  - Grate area: 17.5 sq ft (1.63 m^{2})
- Boiler
  - Model: BR8
  - Pitch: 8 ft 3 in (2,515 mm)
  - Tube plates: 10 ft 10 1/2 in (3,315 mm)
  - Small tubes: 1 5/8 in (41 mm) O.D. × 12 SWG, 162 off
  - Large tubes: 5 1/8 in (130 mm) O.D. × 7 SWG, 12 off
- Boiler pressure: 200 psi (1.38 MPa; 14.1 kgf/cm^{2})
- Heating surface
  - Firebox: 101 sq ft (9.4 m^{2})
  - Tubes and flues: 924 sq ft (85.8 m^{2})
- Superheater
  - Heating area: 124 sq ft (11.5 m^{2})
- Cylinders: Two, outside
- Cylinder size: 16 1/2 in × 24 in (419 mm × 610 mm)
Performance figures
- Tractive effort: 18,513 lbf (82.3 kN)
- Factor of adh.: 4.9
Career
- Operators: British Railways
- Power class: 2MT
- Numbers: 78000–78064
- Nicknames: Mickey Mouse
- Axle load class: Route Availability 3
- Withdrawn: November 1963 – August 1967
- Disposition: Three preserved, one in the process of being rebuilt into tank version, remainder scrapped

The BR Standard Class 2 2-6-0 is a class of steam locomotive, one of the British Railways Standard classes of the 1950s. They were physically the smallest of the Standard classes; 65 were built.

== Overview ==
The design was derived from the Ivatt-designed Class 2 2-6-0, with a reduced cab to enable it to fit into a universal loading gauge, and other standard fittings, most notably a taller chimney, others including the lack of an Ivatt dome and side plates connecting the two sections of the engine. Like the LMS predecessor the BR design had a tender cab to enhance crew protection and visibility when running tender-first. They were all attached to a BR3 type tender. These locomotives are often known by the nickname "Mickey Mouse".

== Construction ==
Darlington works was responsible for building the entire fleet of 65 engines and for a time construction of the LMS and BR designs overlapped. The last No. 78064 was completed in 1956 but the class remained intact for just seven years. Coincidentally the first to be withdrawn No. 78015 was a Darlington-based engine.

== Route availability ==
Like the LMS counterpart, the Standard Mogul was arranged for a low axle-loading of just 13.75 long tons (13.97 t). This allowed it to operate on most lightly laid routes and secondary lines. The route availability was 3. Some of the class had speedometers fitted.

== Reputation ==
Among crews the 2MT 2-6-0 gained a reputation for being very sure-footed. Some maintained however that the engine did not steam well. The most common complaint was the draughty and dirty footplate. This was unusual, given Robert Riddles and his team made an effort to optimise working conditions in the Standards' cab layout.

== Shed allocations ==
Two former Lancashire and Yorkshire Railway sheds (Bank Hall (Liverpool) and Wigan (L&Y), respectively), designated 27A and 27D, received an allocation of the class. Bank Hall had 78041–44 which were used with great success on both slow and fast trains from Liverpool Exchange to either Preston, Bolton or Rochdale. The Wigan engines 78040/61–64 were used on stopping trains to Liverpool, Southport, Bolton and Rochdale. They replaced LMS Class 2P 4-4-0s and L&YR 2-4-2Ts. On the former L&Y lines this class was generally employed on passenger work whilst the LMS Class 2 2-6-0s were normally found on shunting and freight jobs until the mid-1960s.

When the Cambrian section closed and other areas dieselised, other members of the class came to the former L&Y lines (some as replacements for those originally allocated to 27A and 27D). These included 78002 (in green livery), 78007, 78027 and 78057. Some of these were used on shunting duties from Bolton and Lostock Hall sheds. Number 78022 preserved on the Keighley & Worth Valley Railway had a spell as Preston station passenger pilot whilst allocated to Lostock Hall.

== Withdrawal ==
Table of withdrawals
Year	Quantity in service at start of year	Quantity withdrawn	Locomotive numbers	Notes
1963	65	1	78015	
1964	64	4	78005/09/48/53	
1965	60	17	78000–01/04/06/11/14/24–25/27/29–30/32–33/35/42–43/54	
1966	43	30	78002–03/08/10/16–19/22/31/34/36/38–40/45–47/49–52/56–61/63–64	
1967	13	13	78007/12–13/20–21/23/26/28/37/41/44/55/62	

== Preservation ==
Four members of the class were preserved, however one (78059) is currently being converted to the tank version of the class.

Number	Built	Withdrawn	Service Life	Location	Livery	Status	Image	Notes
78018	Mar 1954	Nov 1966	12 Years, 8 months	Great Central Railway	BR Lined Black, Late Crest	Operational, Boiler Ticket Expires: 2026		(Note: 78018: Built at Darlington North Road Works. Entered traffic on 3 March 1954 at West Auckland Shed (County Durham). Became famous for getting stuck in a snow drift during February 1955, which resulted in the film Snowdrift at Bleath Gill. Transferred to Chester Midland in April 1960; Workington in 1962; Willesden in May 1963; Nuneaton in September 1965; Shrewsbury before withdrawal on 12 November 1966. Spent 11 years at Barry scrapyard before being preserved at Shackerstone in November, 1978. Owned & rescued by the Darlington Railway Preservation Society in 1981 from Barry in Wales, after a 34-year restoration effort by the DRPS the locomotive was 85% complete, it was then transferred to the Great Central Railway in 2012 where the remainder of the work was carried out. The locomotive went back into active service on the GCR on 6 October 2016, owned by the DRPS and operated by the GCR. Boiler ticket expires in 2026.)
78019	Mar 1954	Nov 1966	12 Years, 8 months	Great Central Railway	BR Lined Black, Late Crest	Operational, Boiler Ticket Expires: 2032		(Note: 78019: Built at Darlington Works. Allocated to Kirkby Stephen (51H), working on local and banking duties through the Lake District. Then Willesden (1A); Nuneaton (2B); and Crewe South (5B). Withdrawn in 1966, sold to Woodham Brothers, Barry, moving there in 1967. Sold to Severn Valley Railway in 1973, but only stored there before moving to and being restored at the Great Central Railway. Boiler ticket expired in May 2015 and is undergoing overhaul.)
78022	May 1954	Sept 1966	12 Years, 4 months	Keighley & Worth Valley Railway	BR Lined Green, Early Emblem	Operational, Boiler Ticket Expires: 2028		(Note: 78022: Withdrawn for major overhaul December 2000. Having spent over a decade on display in the K&WVR museum at Oxenhope it was moved into Haworth workshops in 2014 in preparation for its long-awaited overhaul and its boiler was removed from the frames in early 2015. Running in commenced in August 2018 following 18 years out of traffic and entered active service in November. Boiler ticket expires in 2028.)
78059/ 84030	Sept 1956	Nov 1966	10 Years, 2 months	Bluebell Railway	N/A	Undergoing conversion into BR Standard Class 2 2-6-2T		(Note: 78059/84030: Lost tender whilst at Woodham Brothers. After rescue to Bluebell, decision was taken to restore the locomotive in the tank-engine form, of which there are no surviving examples. The last BR standard class 2 2-6-2T was numbered 84029, this locomotive takes the next number in the sequence.)
