= BR Standard Class 2 2-6-2T =

British Railways steam locomotive

BR standard class 2 2-6-2T
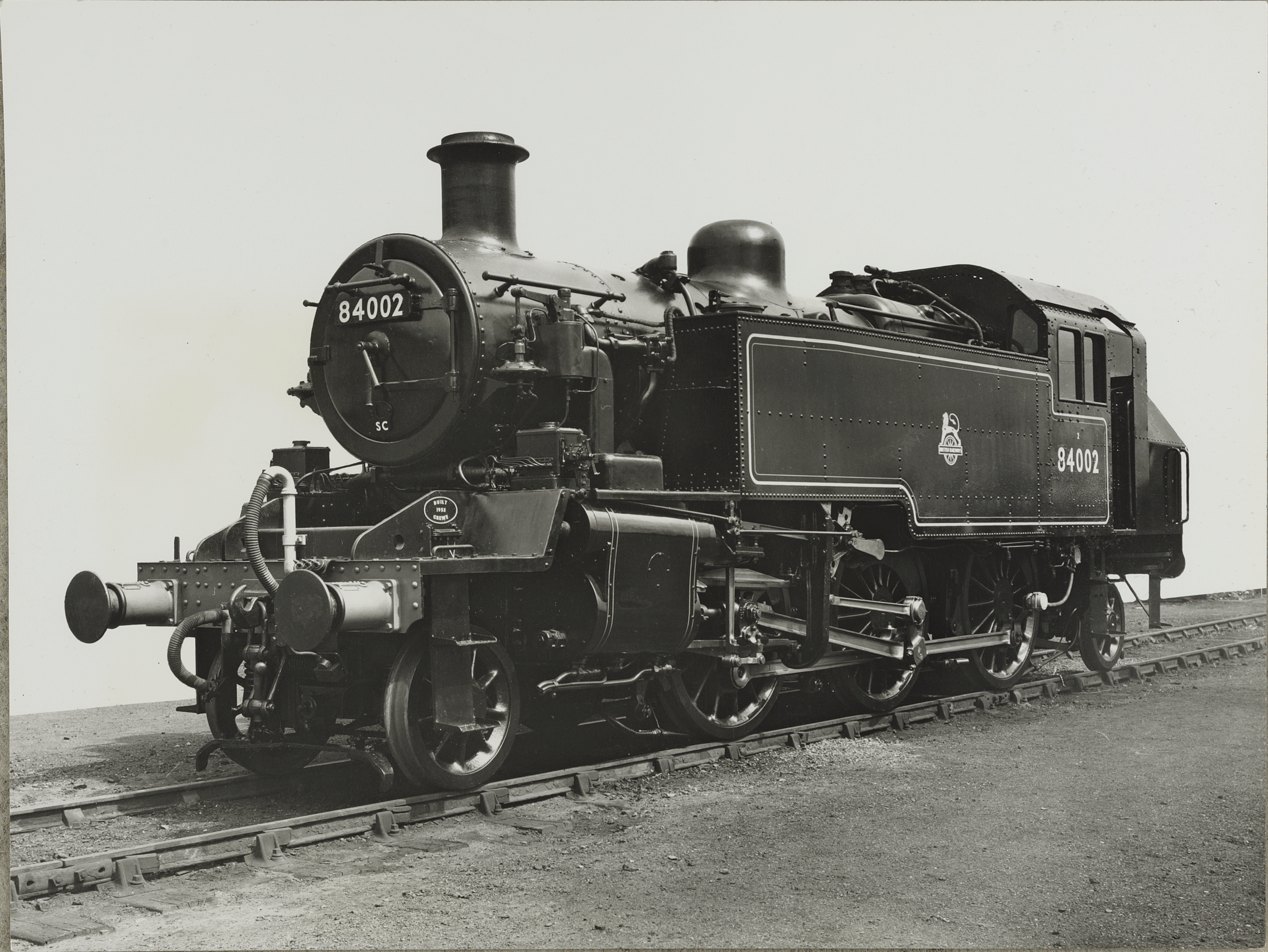
- Crewe Works, British Railways (BR) 84002
Type and origin
- Power type: Steam
- Designer: R. A. Riddles
- Builder: Crewe Works (20); Darlington Works (10)
- Build date: July 1953 – June 1957
- Total produced: 30
Specifications
- Configuration
  - Whyte: 2-6-2T
  - UIC: 1′C1′ h2t
- Gauge: 4 ft 8 1/2 in (1,435 mm)
- Leading dia.: 3 ft 0 in (0.914 m)
- Driver dia.: 5 ft 0 in (1.524 m)
- Trailing dia.: 3 ft 0 in (0.914 m)
- Length: 38 ft 9 1/2 in (11.82 m)
- Width: 8 ft 7 1/2 in (2.63 m)
- Height: 12 ft 9 1/2 in (3.90 m)
- Axle load: 14 long tons (14 t; 16 short tons)
- Adhesive weight: 41.25 long tons (41.91 t; 46.20 short tons)
- Loco weight: 66.05 long tons (67.11 t; 73.98 short tons)
- Fuel type: Coal
- Fuel capacity: 3 long tons (3.0 t; 3.4 short tons)
- Water cap.: 1,350 imp gal (6,100 L; 1,620 US gal)
- Firebox
  - Grate area: 17.5 sq ft (1.63 m^{2})
- Boiler: BR8
- Boiler pressure: 200 psi (1.38 MPa)
- Heating surface
  - Firebox: 101 sq ft (9.4 m^{2})
  - Tubes and flues: 924 sq ft (85.8 m^{2})
- Superheater
  - Heating area: 124 sq ft (11.5 m^{2})
- Cylinders: Two, outside
- Cylinder size: 16.5 in × 24 in (419 mm × 610 mm)
Performance figures
- Tractive effort: 18,513 lbf (82.35 kN)
- Factor of adh.: 5.0
Career
- Operators: British Railways
- Power class: 2MT
- Numbers: 84000–84029
- Axle load class: Route availability 3
- Withdrawn: November 1963 – January 1966
- Disposition: All original locomotives scrapped; one being converted from tender version

The British Railways standard class 2 2-6-2T was a class of steam locomotive, one of the standard classes of the 1950s.

== Design and construction ==
The class was designed at Derby Works and introduced in 1953. The design derived from the LMS Ivatt Class 2 2-6-2T which BR had built after nationalisation. Modifications were made to the Ivatt design including a reduced cab to reduce the loading gauge and some standard fittings. BR classified them 2MT, emphasising a mixed-traffic role.

As most services which required 2MT 2-6-2Ts were already served by the 130 Ivatt engines, B.R. only ordered 30 engines, which eliminated pre-grouping steam locomotives as much as possible on local services.

The first 20 engines were outshopped at Crewe Works, and intended for use on ex-London Midland and Scottish Railway routes, then known as the London Midland Region. The second batch, this time built at Darlington Works, and were also the final steam locomotives built at Darlington were numbered 84020–84029, and intended for Southern Region lines.

== Liveries ==
Only two liveries were carried by the 2MTs- British Railway lined black with the earlier and later emblems. Although all locomotives received the latter, only 84000–84019 received the early emblem as the Darlington built locomotives were constructed in 1957, following the 1956 changeover to the late crest. The Darlington engines carried large 10-inch (25.4 cm) high cab-side numerals, whilst the Crewe engines carried standard 8-inch (20.3 cm) high numerals.

== Service ==
The LMR locomotives were used on push-pull routes, and were often allocated alongside the Ivatt 2MT 2-6-2T engines with which they shared most of their origins. Numbers 84021–84029, the Southern Region locomotives were all allocated to the Eastern Section depot at Ashford for use on the lines over Romney Marsh and local trains on the Margate via Canterbury West route. Most were transferred away to the North Eastern Region in the early 1960s following electrification, but several locomotives (including some of the LMR allocation) were re-allocated to Eastleigh in 1965 for possible use on the Isle of Wight, replacing life-expired LSWR O2 class engines, which were all over 70 years old by then. However, this plan did not cover a coaching stock replacement, and thus the locomotives were ultimately scrapped.

Table of withdrawals
Year	Quantity in service at start of year	Quantity withdrawn	Locomotive numbers	Notes
1963	30	1	84012	
1964	29	9	84001/07/20–24/27/29	
1965	20	10	84000/02–06/08–09/11/18	
1966	10	10	84010/13–17/19/25–26/28	

== Preservation ==
None of the class entered preservation, even though their size and configuration would have made them an ideal choice for use on heritage railways. However, four BR Standard Class 2 2-6-0 locomotives (i.e. the tender-equipped equivalent) did survive, and one of these, 78059, is being rebuilt into 2-6-2T '84030' at the workshops of the Bluebell Railway., thus taking the next number in the original series. 78059 was chosen primarily because it had lost its tender, which was one of several sold off while at Woodham Brothers scrapyard. Further reasons cited are the suitability of the locomotive class for the railway's service trains, and that since the tender version of the class was never allocated to the Southern Region, a tank engine is more appropriate for the Bluebell's southern location.

As of 2013, 78059 was considered no longer extant, as the fitting of the rear frame extensions thus turned it into 84030.
