= British Transport Films =

British Transport Films was an organisation set up in 1949 to make documentary films on the general subject of British transport. Its work included internal training films, travelogues (extolling the virtues of places that could be visited via the British transport system – mostly by rail), and "industrial films" (as they were called) promoting the progress of Britain's railway network.

It was headed by Edgar Anstey until 1974, and from then until its demise by John W. Shepherd. Initially, it made films mostly for the British Transport Commission, but after that organisation was broken up in 1963 the majority of its films were for the British Railways Board. However it also made films for London Transport, the British Waterways Board, the travel company Thomas Cook & Son and the coach company Thomas Tilling.

== Output ==
Their first film was Berth 24 concerning the operation of Hull Docks.

Many of the unit's films celebrated the running of Britain's nationalised railway network; early titles such as Train Time, Elizabethan Express and Snowdrift at Bleath Gill aimed to document and celebrate the achievements and hard work of railway staff and their machinery. Others documented a particular aspect of running a railway, for example running a station as seen in This is York and later Terminus.

Somewhat paradoxically, many of the unit's films celebrated a quiet, unchanging image of rural Britain – with travelogues such as The Heart of England (1954), The Lake District (also 1954), Three Is Company (1959), Down to Sussex (1964) and Midland Country (as late as 1974) – while simultaneously invoking the "white heat of technology" in its other work, such as its Report on Modernisation series instigated in 1959 (renamed Rail Report in 1965).

The unit won many awards over the years, including in 1965 an Academy Award nomination for Snow and in 1966 its first and only win for the film Wild Wings (the latter which had little to do with transport and concentrated on WWT Slimbridge in Gloucestershire, founded by Peter Scott who also narrated). BTF also gave future Oscar-winning director John Schlesinger an early breakthrough with the 1961 film Terminus, chronicling a day in the life of Waterloo station in a style highly uncharacteristic of the unit. Oscar-winning cinematographer David Watkin also got his start lighting BTF films from 1950 to 1960.

BTF also produced the controversial The Finishing Line (1976) and Robbie (1979), which warned children against trespassing on railway lines and are often thought of as Public Information Films.

Some 700 films were made by it over its period of operation.

== Demise ==
BTF continued to make films through the 1970s and early 1980s, notably chronicling the progress of the InterCity 125 (Overture: One-Two-Five) and, poignantly, that of the ill-fated Advanced Passenger Train, but the tide was turning against such "nationalised" industrial film units. In September 1981 BTF's film library closed, with the material being offered back to its retrospective owners. BTF ceased to exist as a full unit in 1982, although the BTF name was still used for various British Rail internal works, many of them by then made on video, until around 1986. For a time the BTF films made for British Rail and London Transport were marketed by the Central Office of Information, but from March 1988 the now-defunct organisation FAME (Film Archive Management and Entertainment) handled the BR films on behalf of the British Railways Board, while the London Transport films went to the London Transport Museum in Covent Garden. In 1996 the British Railways Board was broken up and the BR films – the bulk of the BTF archive – were acquired by the British Film Institute.

== Archives and legacy ==
In the 1980s, 1990s and early 2000s many of the films were released on video, latterly mainly by the British Film Institute (BFI) and by Beulah, which evolved out of FAME and owns the release rights to the BTF films made for London Transport. The British Waterways Board has also released its own library of BTF films on video, and these have latterly appeared on DVD.

In recent years several have been released on DVD, with a number of films made for London Transport appearing on Beulah DVDs before the first BFI DVD compilation of BTF films appeared, after many delays, in June 2005. Ten two-disc compilations of BTF films have now been released by the BFI (as of October 2012). The latest in the series, London on the Move, focuses on the capital's transport systems, including buses.

In May 2019 BFI released a Blu-ray high-definition 2-disc collection of some of the most popular BTF films. All films have been newly digitally remastered from the film source for this release.

== See also ==
- Richard Best
- Geoffrey Jones
- Robert Paynter
- Billy Williams
- List of films set on trains
