= Elizabethan Express =

1954 British film by Tony Thompson

- LNER Class A4 60017 Silver Fox at London King's Cross railway station
- Directed by: Tony Thompson
- Written by: Paul Le Saux
- Produced by: Edgar Anstey
- Narrated by: Alan Wheatley; Howard Marion-Crawford
- Music by: Clifton Parker
- Distributed by: British Transport Films
- Release date: 1954
- Running time: 20 minutes
- Language: English

Elizabethan Express is a 1954 British Transport Film that follows The Elizabethan, a non-stop British Railways service from London King's Cross to Edinburgh Waverley along the East Coast Main Line. Although originally intended as an advertising short, it now acts as a nostalgic record of the halcyon years of steam on British Railways and the ex LNER Class A4.

It was directed by Tony Thompson, with a tongue-in-cheek poetic commentary written by Paul Le Saux. It is also notable for its music by Clifton Parker, who also wrote the score for Blue Pullman and several other British Transport Films. He was later to write the music for the 1959 version of The Thirty-Nine Steps, which also features an A4.

== Synopsis ==
The film follows the preparation behind the service, as well as focusing on one particular journey. The 'star' of the film is the Gresley A4 60017 Silver Fox, although the film makes a point of featuring many railway employees, for example the maintenance men, the driver and fireman and the station master at Waverley station "who has a very high sense of occasion". The train completes its journey in its timetabled 6 hours 30 minutes.

It is still highly regarded for its well-filmed sequences by cinematographer Billy Williams showing the operation of the East Coast Main Line and the Gresley A4 as it was in mainline use, for example the water scoop and corridor tender, although the whimsical verse commentary dates the work considerably. The film also offers a social record of the different hierarchies existing within the railway, as well as the fashion and people in the 1950s, albeit in a romanticised portrayal.

== Background ==
The Elizabethan was a daily non-stop service in celebration of the new 'Elizabethan' era of the early 1950s. Departure from both ends was in mid-morning, for a teatime arrival. It ran only during the summer months, including in 1953 and 1954. It was able to make the 393-mile (632 km) journey from London to Edinburgh non-stop by using LNER Class A4 steam locomotives equipped with a corridor tender, enabling a change of crew en route. It also required drivers to take up as much water as possible at the troughs, since the journey called for over 11,000 imperial gallons (50,000 L) of water.

The journey time of 6 hours 30 minutes gave an end-to-end average speed of just over 60 mph (97 km/h), regarded as a creditable achievement given the poor state of British Railways infrastructure in the immediate postwar era. At the time this was the longest scheduled non-stop railway journey in the world.

== See also ==
- List of named passenger trains of the United Kingdom
