= Silver link =

Silver link may refer to:

- Silver Link, a Japanese animation studio
- Silverlink, a former British train operating company
- LNER Class A4 2509 Silver Link, a British steam locomotive
  - Silverlink Shopping Park, a retail park in Tyneside named after the locomotive
- Burdekin Bridge, a road-rail bridge in Australia
