= Utilitywise =

- Company type: Public limited company
- Industry: Energy broker
- Founded: 2006; 19 years ago in Gateshead, United Kingdom
- Founder: Geoffrey Thompson
- Defunct: February 2019
- Fate: Administration/closure
- Headquarters: Cobalt Business Park, North Tyneside, United Kingdom
- Area served: Europe
- Number of employees: 800 (2014)
- Website: utilitywise.com

Utilitywise was a British energy consultancy company based in Tyne and Wear, United Kingdom. The business had operations across the UK at their North Tyneside base, Redditch, Bury St Edmonds, Portsmouth and Leicester, as well as 150 staff in the Czech Republic.

== History ==
Utilitywise was founded in 2006 in Team Valley, Gateshead by Geoffrey Thompson as Commercial Utility Brokers Limited. In 2010 the business was rebranded as Utilitywise. When Utilitywise entered the Alternative Investment Market in 2012 at 60p per share the Financial Times described the business as "the belle of the ball". In 2013 the company won the AIM's "Best Use of AIM Award" and in 2014 won their "Company of the Year Award".

In 2012 the business moved from Jarrow to South Shields, then in 2014 as the business was further expanding they relocated to the Cobalt Business Park in North Tyneside in the largest North East office leasing deal since 2009, taking 77,632 sq ft of space.

By 2014 the company's market value rose above £200m and had 800 employees. One of the company's investors was the high-profile Neil Woodford who owned 29%. In 2015 Utilitywise acquired Energy Intelligence Centre for £15.5 million and later rebranded that division of the business simply as EIC.

In 2017 the founder, Geoffrey Thompson, stepped down as chairman, and sold his remaining 6% stake in 2018.

In 2018 Utilitywise partnered with Vodafone and Dell EMC to deliver IoT energy monitoring solutions. Utilitywise entered into operations in Prague, Czech Republic when it acquired ICON Communication Centres.

In January 2019 the company put itself up for sale after announcing that it needed a cash injection of £10 million to keep the business afloat. In early February the administrators were in discussions with potential investors to rescue the business.

On 14 February the company entered administration. Creditors lodged claims of £116.1 million at the time of its collapse. Initially at the time of entering administration 570 jobs were lost at its North Tyneside base.

In April, two months after entering administration it was announced that The Monarch Partnership had acquired the Energy Intelligence Centre and T-Mac Technologies enterprise businesses from Utilitywise.
