= Collective switching =

Collective Switching is where customers negotiate a group deal with a utility service such as gas or electricity. The practice has been popular in the United Kingdom, Australia, the Netherlands, and Ireland. In the UK, collective switching has always been managed by a third party, which gathers the consumers together into a grouping via a registration or membership model and then takes their collective demand to the supply base and obtains from a supplier preferential or bespoke rates for that group of consumers.

There is no set model for how individual schemes operate, although a third party, such as an energy broker, usually seeks to negotiate a better energy tariff with energy suppliers on behalf of the group. Davidson and Cirell argue that, to be successful, a scheme must operate transparently and efficiently, "with the motives of the organiser being geniune".

== Collective switching in the UK ==
Collective switching schemes have been seen in the UK since May 2012, and have been encouraged by the Department for Energy and Climate Change (DECC) under the Coalition government. DECC believed that collective switching had the ability to increase the competition for consumers within the energy market, particularly among people who had never switched before, and encouraging suppliers to innovate to acquire new customers.

The schemes are not directly regulated by energy industry regulator, Ofgem, but they are indirectly through the supplier which "wins" any particular collective switch; as that supplier has obligations to the consumer under its supply licence conditions. Collective switches may also be run by price comparison websites, which can be accredited by Ofgem's confidence code, but the collective switch itself falls outside of this confidence code.

Collective switching attempts to deliver the best tariff for a collection of disparate consumers that may have different usage patterns and priorities. It should not purport to deliver the cheapest deal to all participants as there are inevitably outliers that would obtain a better deal elsewhere. As the name suggests the emphasis is on collective rather than cheapest; although if the numbers of members are large enough and the remit of the collective switch is solely price then the associated deal may indeed be the cheapest deal at a point in time; but that is by no means certain. Collective switching can also apply to any type of tariff for which there is a collective need, and also covers purchasing of domestic heating oil. Green energy supply is one example of a collective switch where the criteria used are not purely a function of cost.

Collective switching schemes which have operated in the UK include:

- My Utility Genius (The Big British Switch)
- The Big Deal
- Milkman Energy
- DECC guidance refers to the Big Community Switch, the Big London Energy Switch and Ready to Switch as examples of schemes supported under an initiative called "Cheaper Energy Together".
