= North Tyneside Steam Railway =

Visitor attraction in North East England

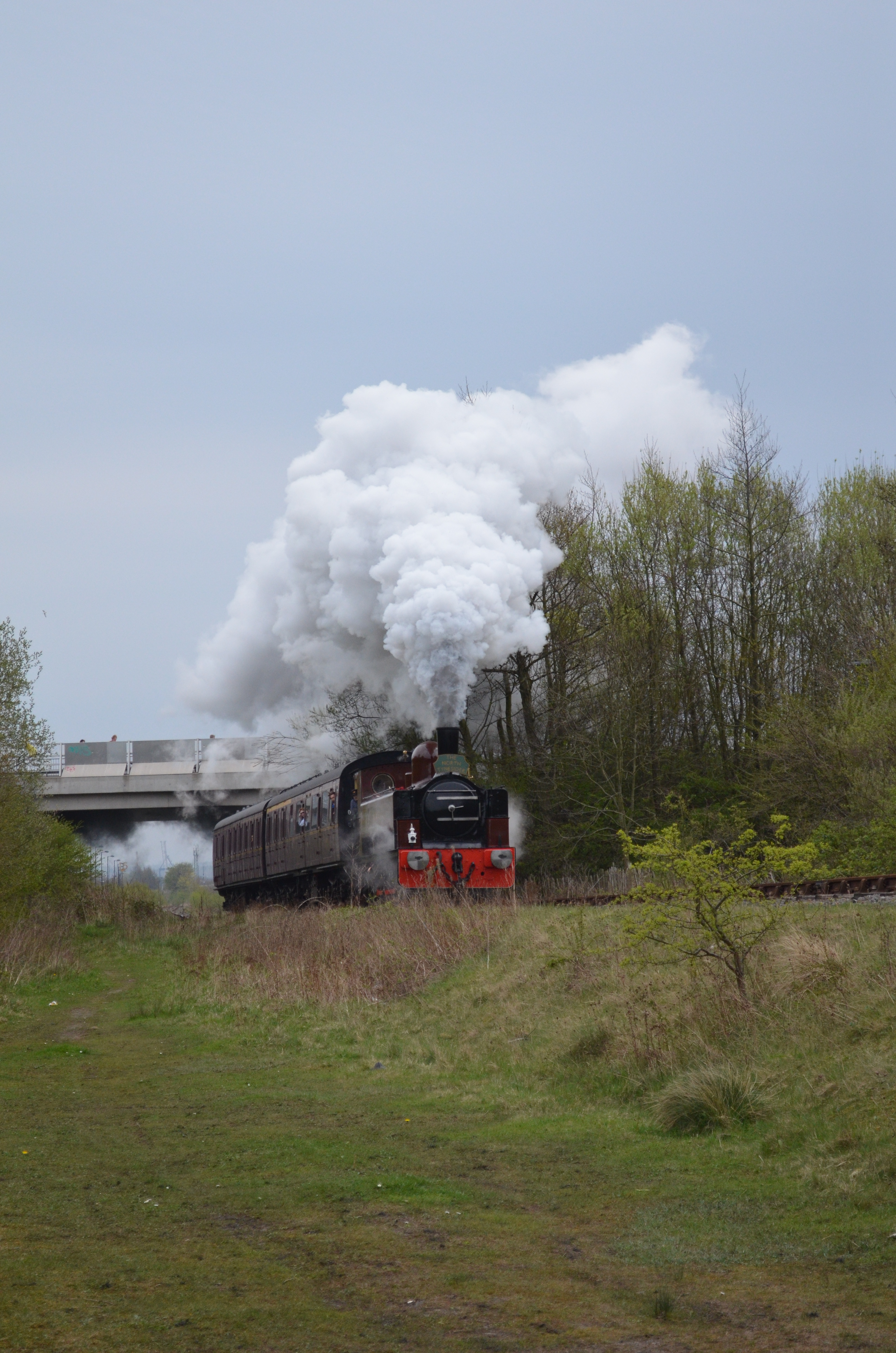
- Locale: North Shields, Tyne and Wear, England
- Terminus: Middle Engine Lane
- Coordinates: 55.008°N 1.485°W

Commercial operations
- Original gauge: 4 ft 8 1/2 in (1,435 mm) standard gauge

Preserved operations
- Operated by: North Tyneside Steam Railway Association
- Stations: 2
- Length: 2 mi (3.2 km)
- Preserved gauge: 4 ft 8 1/2 in (1,435 mm) standard gauge

Website
- Stephenson Steam Railway; North Tyneside Steam Railway Association

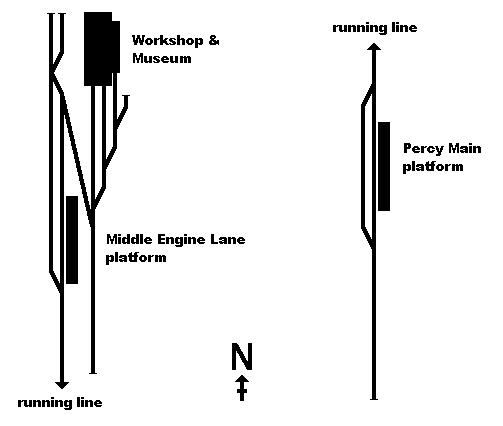
Track layout diagram of the railway's yard and station loops.

The North Tyneside Steam Railway and Stephenson Steam Railway are visitor attractions in North Shields, North East England. The museum and railway workshops share a building on Middle Engine Lane adjacent to the Silverlink Retail Park. The railway is a standard gauge line, running south for 2 miles (3.2 km) from the museum to Percy Main. The railway is operated by the North Tyneside Steam Railway Association (NTSRA). The museum is managed by North East Museums on behalf of North Tyneside Council.

The railway runs along the alignment of various former coal wagonways, which were later used by the Tyne and Wear Metro Test Centre; the museum and workshop building used to be the test facility. The museum is dedicated to the railway pioneers George Stephenson and his son Robert, with one of George's early locomotives, Billy, housed in the museum.

== History ==
=== Horse drawn and rope hauled waggonways ===
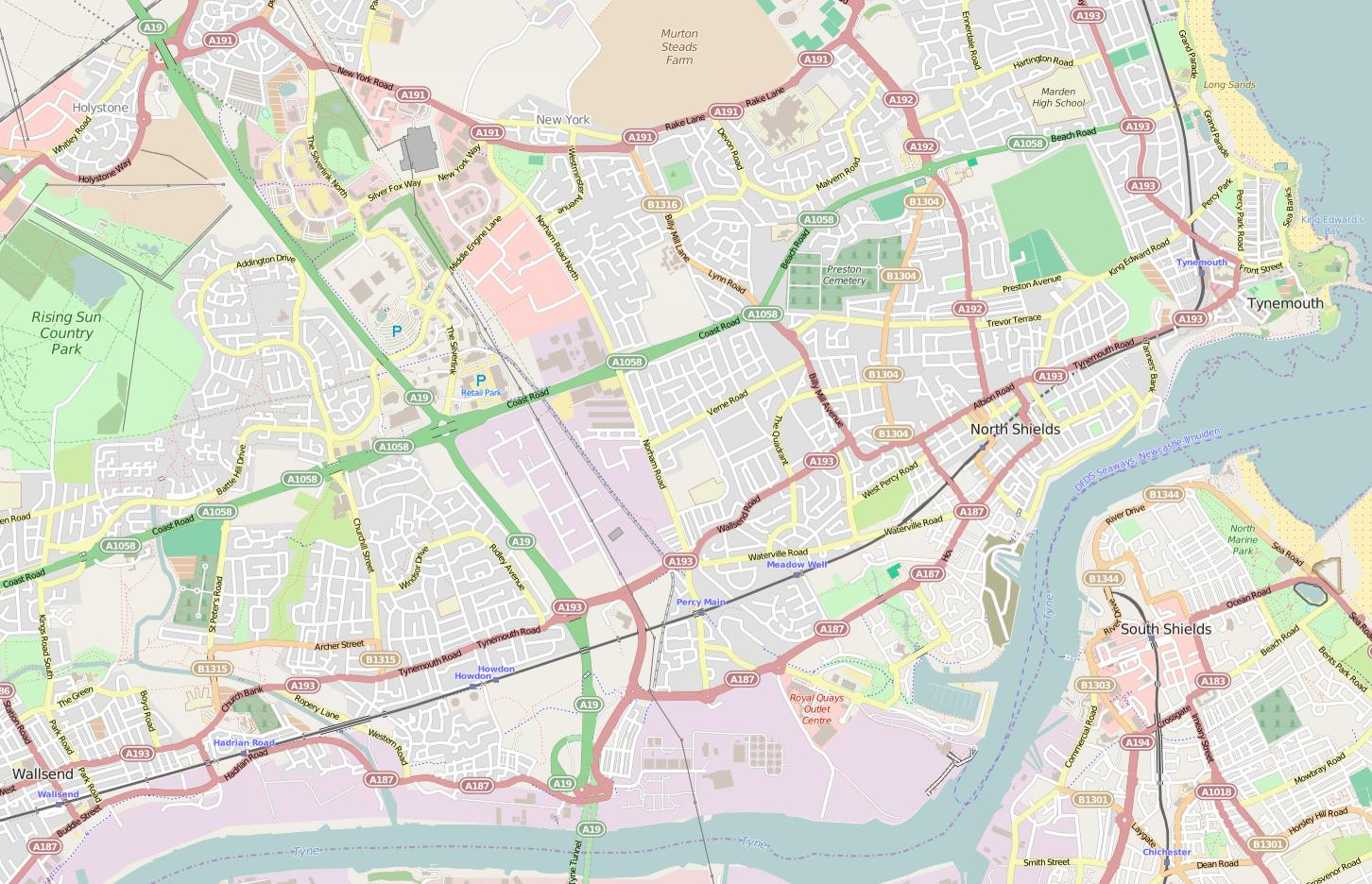
The railway's location (centre), on the north bank the River Tyne

As the early coal seams of the Northumberland Coalfield near the River Tyne were exhausted, waggonways were laid to serve pits sunk further north. Coal would be unloaded into colliers (coal transport ships) via staithes. The first wagonways used wooden waggons on wooden rails drawn by horses. The first traffic began in 1755 on a line from Shiremoor to Hayhole staithes, and was soon followed by more lines. Wooden rails were eventually replaced by wrought iron. Rope haulage was introduced from 1821, with the museum site being at the top of Prospect Hill. By the 1820s coal was coming from pits further to the north in Seghill, Backworth and Cramlington, while a pit at Murton near Shiremoor had also been added. In 1826 it also became the preferred route for coal coming from Fawdon to the west, to make it unnecessary to use keel boats further upriver.

Traffic increased as further pits opened, and the corridor from Middle Engine Lane down to Percy Main became congested as companies either shared lines or built their own within a hundred yards of each other, depending on which was more convenient. Once they crossed the line of the present A193 Wallsend Road, they fanned out to their respective unloading points. In 1839 the Cramlington wagonway built a new line away from the corridor further to the west, while still passing close to it at the Middle Engine Lane and Percy Main ends. By the 1840s, coal was also coming from Blyth and Bedlington on the east coast, although this ceased after improvements to Blyth harbour in the 1880s.

The opening of the route to Blyth also saw passenger services being run to Percy Main from 1841, for connections with the Newcastle and North Shields Railway. These were run by what eventually became the Blyth & Tyne Railway. Passenger services ceased around 1864 when they opened an alternative route further to the east via Monkseaton (now the present Metro route).

=== Steam locomotive working and Metro test track ===
At its peak, there were four lines on the corridor, with three stationary engines in close proximity to the museum. Having already been in use on other parts of the lines, gradient improvements on the Blyth & Tyne's line allowed it to use steam locomotives throughout from the 1850s. Others persisted with rope haulage, the Seaton Burn Wagonway being the last to convert in 1900.

Coal production began to decline after the First World War causing the Seaton Burn wagonway to close in the 1920s; a new route from the Rising Sun colliery to the west did open in 1939, although this was to replace a line on a different route. In the late 1940s the coal and railway companies were nationalised - the lines on the corridor were now controlled by either the National Coal Board (NCB) or British Rail (BR) (as the eventual owners of the Blyth & Tyne). Rationalisation saw with the Cramlington line to the west closed in the 1950s.

As volumes further declined, the last Percy Main staithes closed in 1971, leading to the closure of the NCB lines, although the BR lines persisted. In 1975, the Seaton Burn wagonway alignment was relaid for use by the Tyne and Wear Metro Test Centre, with a 1.5-mile (2.4 km) test track running from Middle Engine Lane as far south as the A1058 Coast Road bridges, and north beyond Middle Engine Lane on the Backworth wagonway alignment to West Allotment. The two prototype Metrocars worked out of a two-road maintenance shed constructed in Middle Engine Lane. Once the Metro system opened in 1979, the test centre closed and the track infrastructure was dismantled, leaving only the shed. The last BR line (Percy Main to Backworth) closed in 1983 and the tracks were lifted, ending over 200 years of railway use of the corridor.

=== Museum and heritage railway ===
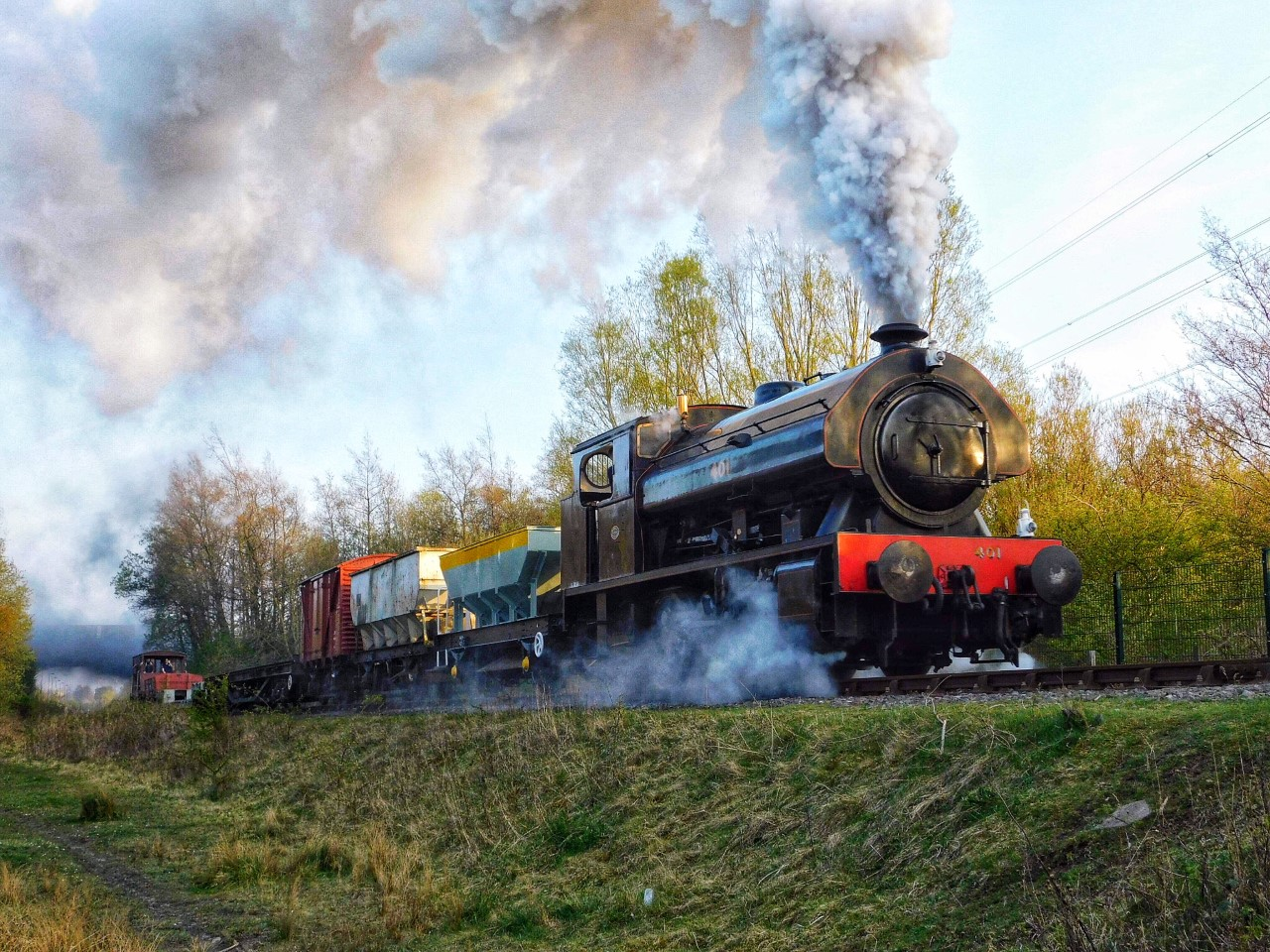
401 running a demonstration freight train

In 1982/4 North Tyneside Council acquired the test sheds as the nucleus for a transport museum. A partnership was formed between Tyne and Wear Museums and the council, to construct a steam hauled passenger railway rather than a static transport museum. The North Tyneside Steam Railway Association formed at the site after the Monkwearmouth Station Museum Association relocated to Middle Engine Lane, bringing with them some items of rolling stock they had been restoring in the Monkwearmouth station's goods shed, which was in a deteriorating condition. From 1987, volunteers under supervision conducted the works necessary to relay a single track from the museum to Percy Main. The line was completed in 1989 and the first passenger trains ran in early 1991.

In 1994, Tyne and Wear Development Corporation and North Tyneside City Challenge made a grant available to North Tyneside Council to extend the workshops, redesign the museum space and construct a new facilities block. In 2003 the facilities block was further modified to improve educational and toilet facilities. In the early 1990s the LNER Class A4 4464 Bittern was displayed at the museum disguised as the Silver Link; the local Silverlink Business Park took its name from that locomotive due to it being at the museum of the time of construction. Bittern was moved to York in 1994 in exchange for loaning a Deltic.

In 2007, the Tyne and Wear Museums and North Tyneside Council's head of cultural services have submitted plans for a feasibility study into developing the museum into a premier North East railway tourist attraction, with period buildings, a link to Percy Main Metro station, and all year round opening.

In 2019, Tyne & Wear Archives & Museums (now North East Museums) were given a lottery grant provided to redevelop the Stephenson Railway Museum. Among a lot of refurbishment in the museum building, this has also seen the name change from the Stephenson Railway Museum to the Stephenson Steam Railway.

In 2023 the Railway was awarded lottery funding to develop a woodland walk covering a two-acre site.

== Operation ==
=== Management ===
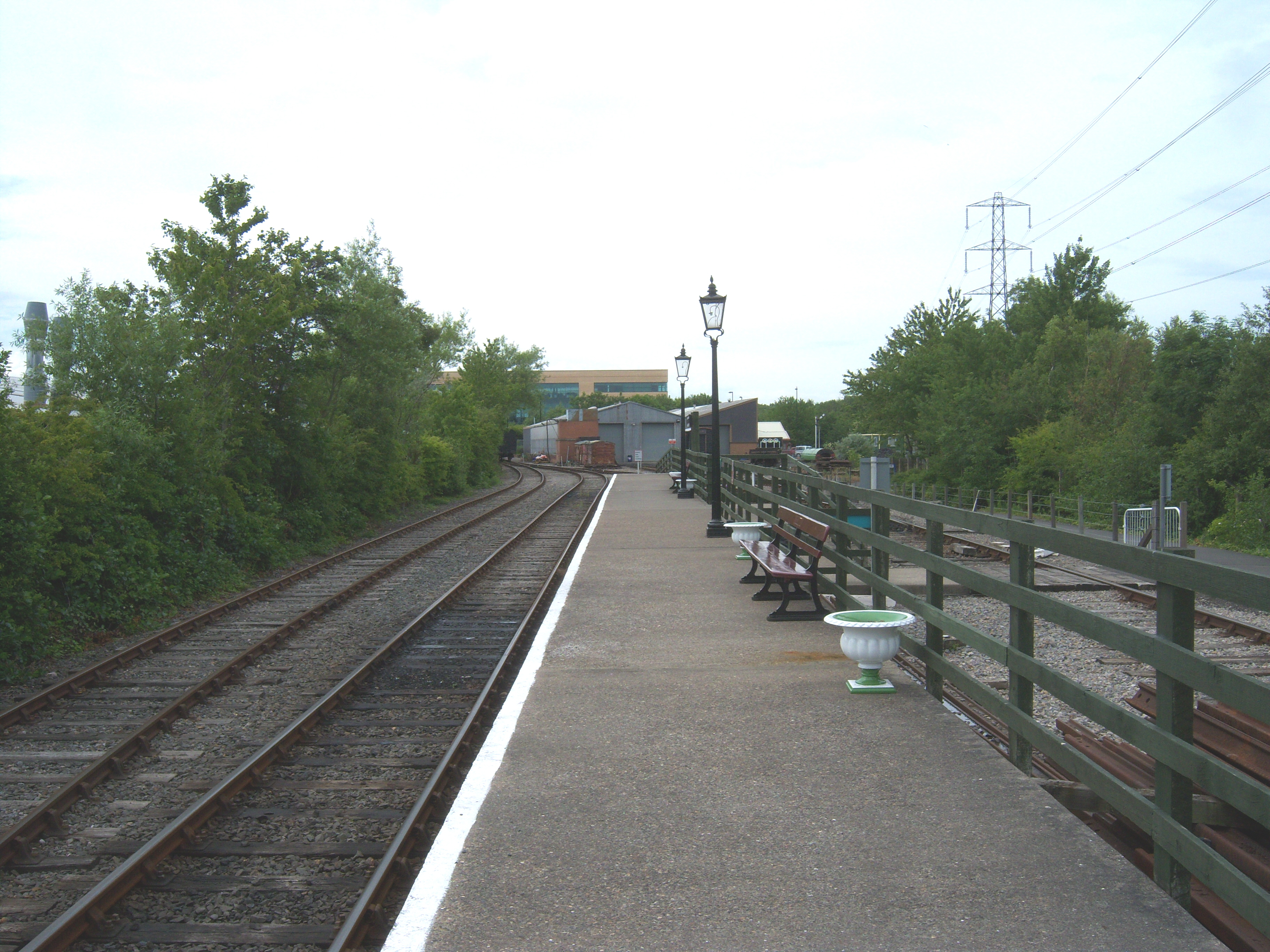
Middle Engine Lane platform, looking north

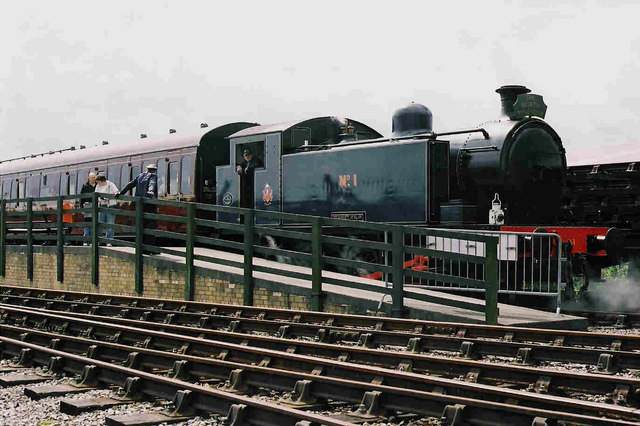
Meaford No. 1 at Middle Engine Lane in 2000

The museum is managed by North East Museums on behalf of North Tyneside Council. Volunteers of the North Tyneside Steam Railway Association (NTSRA) operate the railway and assist with the maintenance and conservation of locomotives and rolling stock. The NTSRA is managed by a committee that meets quarterly and has an Annual General Meeting yearly.

=== Infrastructure ===
The building on Middle Engine Lane serves as the railway workshop and the museum's indoor exhibition space, the workshop being on the left-hand side. The railway yard has three sidings entering the building from the south, the westernmost being for the workshop, while the two others enter the exhibition space allowing operational stock to be put on display.

The running line of the railway consists of a single track line, with two open-air platforms at either end, both with a passing loop. The northern platform, "Middle Engine Lane", is just south of the museum building. The southern platform, "Percy Main", is immediately south of the point where the Metro crosses the railway, paralleling the length of Brunton Street, to which there is pedestrian access for passengers wishing to leave the train there.

=== Services ===
Entry to the museum is free; rides on the trains requires purchase of a ticket. The museum building also contains a gift shop and toilet facilities, and a cafe which opens on certain event days. The cafe was renovated in Autumn 2017. The museum is only open at certain times of the year, and passenger trains are only run on some of those days.

As of 2018 two main timetables are in operation. Green timetable is used on Sundays/Bank Holidays which runs four round trips - departing at 11.30am, 12.30pm, 2.00pm and 3.00pm. The Blue timetable is used on Thursdays during school holidays which runs three round trips - departing at 12.30pm, 1.30pm and 2.30pm. Special event days include a Halloween Special, a 1940s weekend, Beer Festival (Ale by Rail), Winter Warmers and Santa Specials.

== Rolling stock ==
=== Stock list ===
Image	Name/No.	Built	Builder	Class/Type	Status
Steam locomotives
	No.1	1951	Robert Stephenson and Hawthorns	0-6-0T	Static Exhibit
	Billy	1816	George Stephenson	0-4-0	Static Exhibit
Bagnall No.401	No.401	1950	Bagnall	Victor/Vulcan 0-6-0ST	Operational
	Ashington No.5 Jackie Milburn	1939	Peckett and Sons	0-6-0ST	Operational
Kitson A-Class A.No.5 NTSR	A.No.5	1883	Kitson & Co.	0-6-0T	Static Exhibit
Hunslett Austerity No.69	No.69	1953	Hunslet	Hunslet Austerity 0-6-0ST	Undergoing Overhaul
	No. 4	1953	Sentinel Waggon Works	Sentinel 0-4-0VBGT	Undergoing Overhaul
	No. 2 (Pony)	1912	Hawthorn Leslie	Hawthorn Leslie 0-4-0ST	Awaiting Overhaul
Diesel locomotives
Class 08 No.08915	No.08915	1962	Horwich Works	British Rail Class 08 0-6-0DE	Operational
Class 03 No.03078	No.03078	1959	Doncaster Works	British Rail Class 03 0-6-0DM	Operational
Consett Iron Company No.10	No.10	1958	Consett Iron Company	0-6-0	Operational
Electric locomotives
Tyne and Wear Metrocar 4001	Tyne and Wear Metrocar 4001	1975	Metro-Cammell	British Rail Class 599	Static Exhibit
Harton Electric E4	Harton Electric E4	1912	Siemens		Static Exhibit
	3267	1904	North Eastern Railway	Motor Parcel Van	Static Exhibit
Coaches
	48015	1955	Doncaster	Mk 1 Second Lavatory Open 330	Operational
	43010	1954	Doncaster	Mk 1 non-gangwayed Lavatory Composite 313	Operational
	43172; Ex-53172	1954	Doncaster	Mk 1 Brake Second 371	Operational
Wagons
Dogfish wagon NTSR	DB 992993	1956	Metro Cammell	24 ton 14 ft 4 wheel Steel Ballast Hopper Dogfish ZFV 1/587	Operational
	Boldon Colliery No. 103; No. 136 Whitburn Colliery	1927		4 wheel 4-plank Open Wagon	Operational (battery carrier for E4)
Matchwagon NTSR				4 wheel Flat Wagon TTP Cosmetically restored to represent BR Barrier vehicle	Operational
Flat wagon NTSR	ZV 733728			4 wheel Flat Wagon	Operational
Tool Van NTSR	B 774658	1957	BR Wolverton	12 ton 10 ft 4 wheel Ventilated Van Vanfit VVV 1/208	Operational
NCB Lambton Van	21		North Eastern Railway	NCB Lambton Platelayers Van	Undergoing Restoration
	DB 996297	1953	Head Wrightson	50 ton 8 wheel Bogie Flat Salmon YMP 1/642	Operational
Lowmac NTSR	B 900402	1949	Derby	40 ton 8 wheel Bogie Flatrol Lowmac	Operational
Tank Wagon NTSR	3	1939		20 ton 4 wheel tank wagon	Operational
Tank Wagon NTSR No.4	4	1950	Charles Roberts	20 ton 4 wheel tank wagon	Operational
Leeds Brewery Tank Wagon NTSR	A 5776			20 ton 4 wheel British Petroleum Ltd tank wagon	Operational
21t Coal Wagon NTSR	B 415776	1954	Shildon	21 ton coal hopper wagon	Operational
21t Coal Wagon NTSR 2	722	1958	Hurst Nelson	21 ton coal hopper wagon	Operational
21t Coal Wagon NTSR 3	6555	1956	Hurst Nelson	21 ton coal hopper wagon	Operational
Box Container				5 ton Type BD General Goods Container (Diagram 3/050)	Unrestored
Box van NTSR	B 85xxxx			12 ton 10f 4 wheel Ventilated Van Shocvan VSV 1/209	Unrestored
Departmental stock
	B 951920	1953	BR Faverdale	20 ton 16 ft 4 wheel Brake Van Toad CAP 1/506	Operational
Railway Crane NTSR	DRS 81140	1957	Smith Rodley	6 wheel 10 ton Diesel Mechanical Crane	Stored
Crane Runner NTSR	DE321051	1927	Stratford	Four-wheel PMVY, converted to Crane Runner	Stored

=== Steam locomotives ===
==== Billy ====
Billy was built by George Stephenson in 1816, and was one of the various pioneering designs now known as the Killingworth locomotives, because they were built for use in Killingworth Colliery. It is often referred to as the Killingworth Billy to differentiate it from Puffing Billy, built by William Hedley in 1813 for the Wylam Colliery. Killingworth Billy ran until 1879, and it was presented to the city of Newcastle upon Tyne in 1881. It is a stationary exhibit, mounted on a short stretch of period track with block-mounted rails, to remain compatible with horse-drawn trains. Horses would have been tripped up by conventional sleepers.

==== No.1 ====
An 0-6-0 side tank built in 1951 as works number 7683. It is thought she was delivered new to Meaford Power Station to shunt coal waggons. It was one of several of its type supplied to power stations by Robert Stephenson and Hawthorns Ltd., Forth Banks, Newcastle upon Tyne during the 1950s. They were used to transport coal wagons from mainline sidings into the power station, supplying the boiler-house coal bunkers. Their small diameter wheels enabled heavy loads to be hauled at slow speeds. Larger wheeled versions were supplied when long journeys were needed - for example, some colliery systems. Locally they could be seen working at places in Northumberland and Durham including Ashington, Backworth, Stanley and Consett. This loco was purchased from the Power Station by the East Lancashire Railway and hauled their first trains at Bury. After a period in store, she was overhauled at Bury and moved to Tyneside in 1996. It ran for several years before being taken out of service in 2003. It is currently on display in the museum.

==== Ashington No.5 Jackie Milburn ====
This 0-6-0 saddle tank was built in 1939 as works number 1970 by Peckett and Sons of Bristol for Ashington Coal Company which operated one of Britain's most extensive colliery railway systems. In 1939, two identical locomotives were delivered to one of Peckett's standard designs and they received the names Ashington No 5 & Ashington No 6. The former spent her entire industrial career on the railway for which she was built. In 1969 she was sold by the National Coal Board to North Norfolk Preserved Railway when the Ashington system was dieselised. However, she returned to Northumberland in 1991 and was repainted into the "as delivered to Ashington Colliery" livery. The loco was additionally named Jackie Milburn in honour of the local football hero. Returned to service in 2025 following overhaul.

==== A.No.5 ====
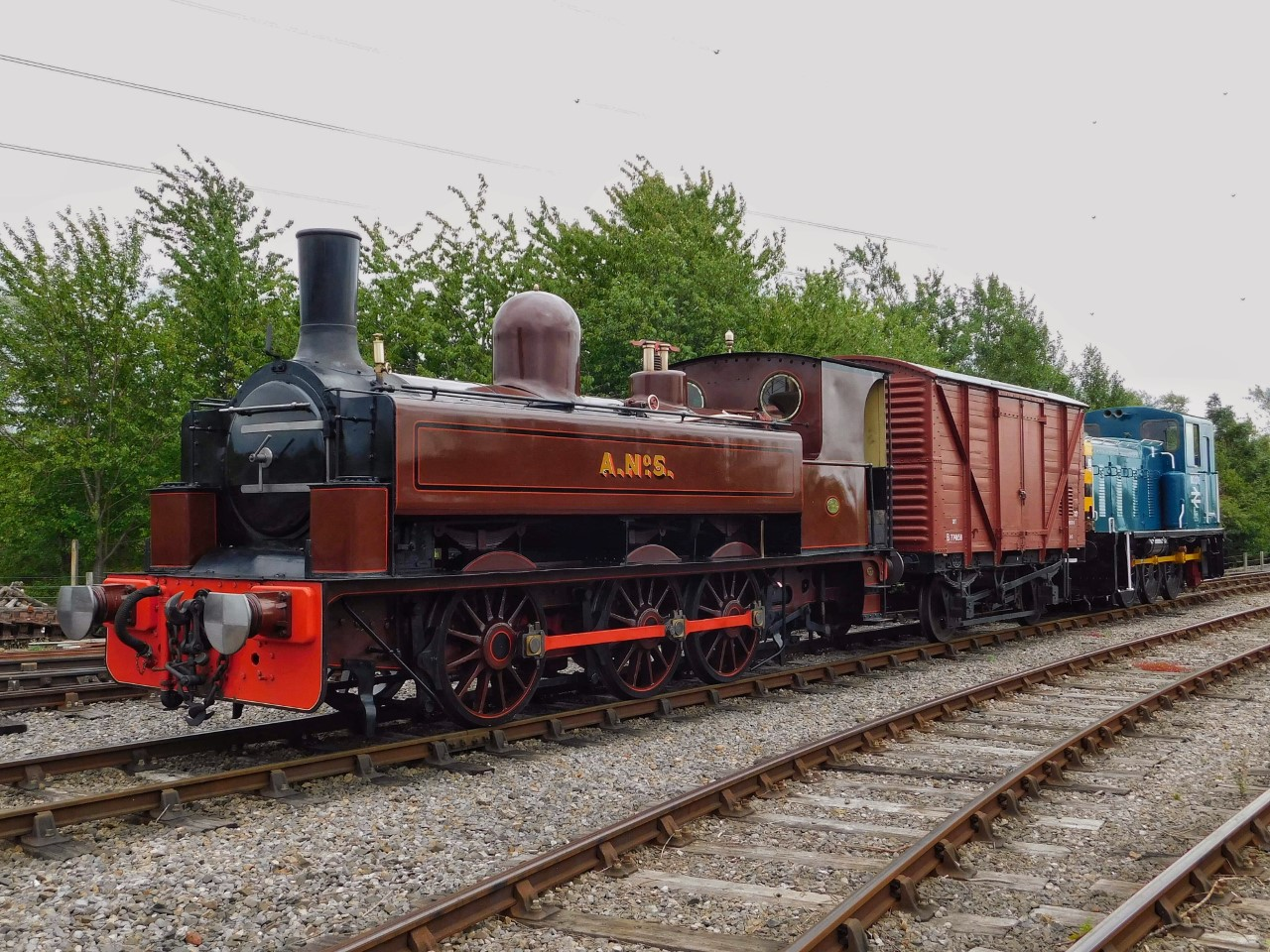
A.No.5 being shunted by 03078

A.No.5 is an 0-6-0 side tank built-in 1883 by Kitson and Company, as works number 2509. It was the last working example of the 1841 patented Stephenson 'long boiler' design, to produce higher steam pressure while retaining a small wheelbase. Unsuited for high speeds, they nonetheless satisfied a need for powerful shunters at certain industrial railways like the Consett Iron and Steel Company. Withdrawn in 1972 it passed to Beamish Museum and then the Tyne & Wear Museums Service at Monkwearmouth Station, Sunderland, where the Monkwearmouth Station Museum Association began its overhaul from a very derelict condition. It returned to steam in 1986. It was overhauled in 1995/6 and again in 2013/14. Removed from service and placed back on static display in the museum in summer 2018.

==== No.401 ====
No. 401 was one of a class of three built for the Steel Company of Wales in 1950, as works number 2994 (2995 and 2996 were built in 1951), to an advanced specification designed to provide a low maintenance competitor to the diesel shunters emerging. As such it had many advanced features not seen on other industrial steam locomotives. It was sold to Austin Motor Co. Ltd., of Longbridge, Birmingham in 1957 before passing in 1973 to the developing West Somerset Railway. Once it became surplus to larger locomotives there, the Stephenson Railway Museum purchased 2994 and repainted it from "Kermit the frog" green to a black livery similar to a NER style. The locomotive was placed on static display in 2008. After a 6-year restoration period it returned to active service in Easter 2019. In 2020, 401 was repainted into its original 'Steel Company of Wales Ltd' unlined maroon with lemon lettering livery.

==== No.69 ====
No.69 was built in 1953, works number 3785. The engine spent its entire working life at South Hetton Colliery which served the Hawthorn and Murton colliery complex as well as Seaham. In preservation, it ran at the Yorkshire Dales Railway, now the Embsay and Bolton Abbey Steam Railway, from 1977 until 1984 before being parked up pending overhaul. Restoration of the locomotive has begun with work completed including tyre turning, painting of the frames and overhaul of various boiler components as of January 2024. No.69 is privately owned by an NTSRA member/volunteer.

==== No.4 ====
Built by Sentinel in 1953, this locomotive began its life at the Totternhoe Quarries in Dunstable, working for Rugby Portland Cement Co. Ltd as their No. 1. In 1964, it was reassigned to the company's New Bilton Works in Rugby. A brief stint followed in early 1966 when it was loaned to the Southam Works in Warwickshire, though it returned to New Bilton within a couple of months.

By 1967, the locomotive changed hands, sold to Thomas Hill Ltd in Killamarsh, Yorkshire. The following year, it was resold to R.Y. Pickering & Co. Ltd, a wagon manufacturer in Wishaw, Lanarkshire. Renumbered as No. 4, it took on the task of shunting a variety of wagons, including massive 100-ton bogie oil tankers. The company later became Norbrit-Pickering Ltd. In July 1979, the locomotive found a new home at the Tanfield Railway, arriving alongside RW Hawthorn Works No. 2009.

In 2024 the locomotive was moved to the railway from Tanfield and is currently undergoing an overhaul.

==== BHC No. 2 (Pony) ====
This locomotive, built by Hawthorn Leslie in 1912, originally served the Blyth Harbour Commission as BHC No. 2.

In 1971, it was sold to the Yorkshire Dales Railway at Embsay (now the Embsay & Bolton Abbey Steam Railway) for restoration and renamed Pony. It was later moved to the Heritage Centre at County School, a preservation site initially managed by the Great Eastern Railway. The location eventually became a hub for the Mid-Norfolk Railway, and after a rebuild, the locomotive returned to service in 1994. Following the closure of the County School project in 1996, it was sold to a private buyer.

In 1998, the locomotive was purchased by the Chatham Historic Dockyard Trust, relocated to Chatham, and renamed Achilles. It operated there until 2004, when its boiler certificate expired, taking it out of service. Later, in February 2022, it was moved to Derbyshire for an overhaul. As of 2024, the locomotive has changed ownership again and is now part of the North Tyneside Steam Railway collection.

=== Diesel locomotives ===
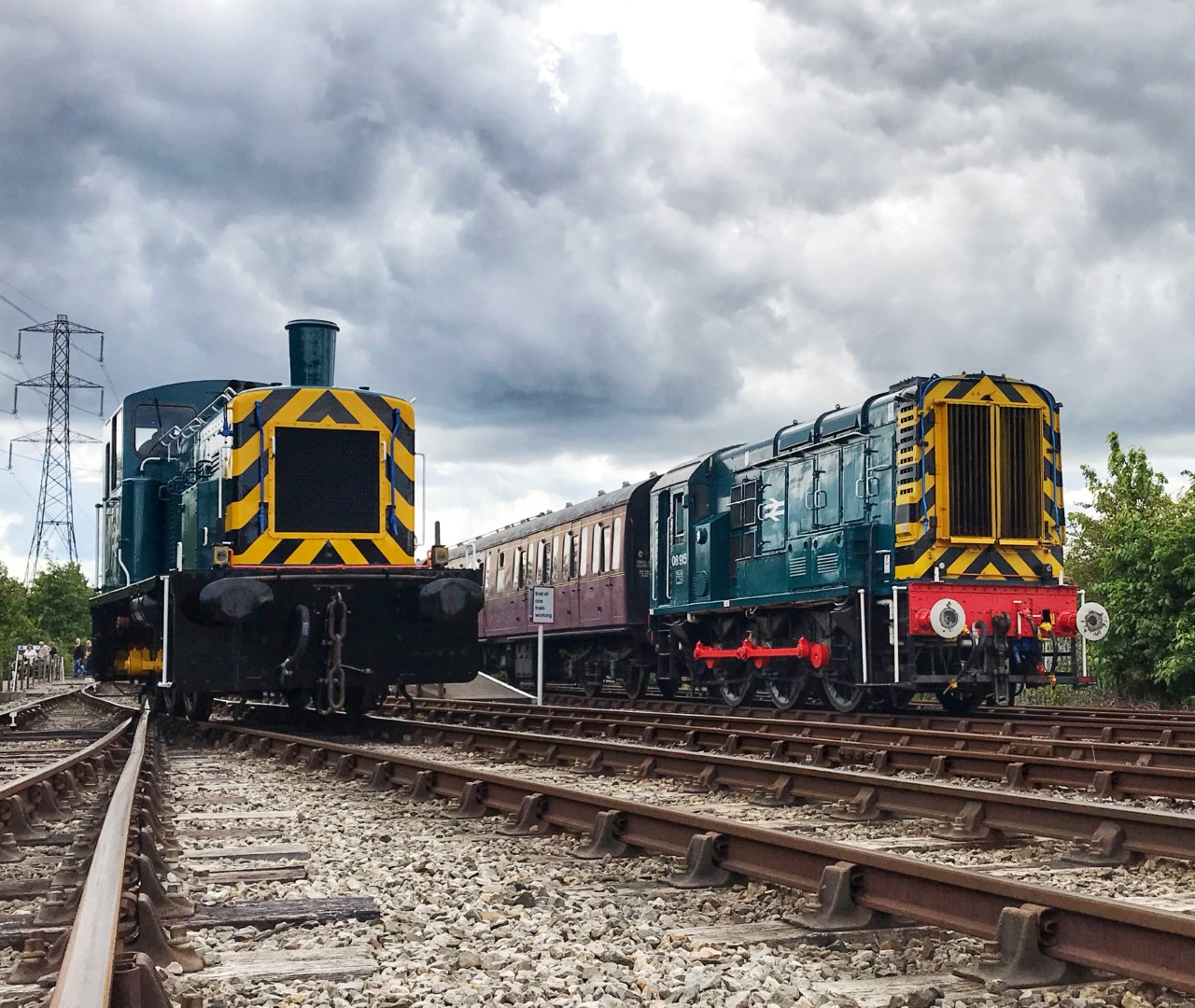
03078 shunting in the yard with 08915 on passenger services.

==== No.08915 ====
No.08915 (originally D4145) used to be of Allerton (AN) depot. Restored to BR Blue in 2017.

==== No.03078 ====
No.03078 (originally D2078) used to be of Gateshead (GD) depot and Newcastle's pilot shunter. Repainted into BR Blue early 2019.

==== No.10 ====
An early diesel built in 1958, Consett Iron and Steelworks No.10 is the last example of in-house production of locomotives by industrial railways in the North East. It was conceived in their Templetown workshops to satisfy a need for a 300 hp shunter with mechanical transmission, and was based on a Hunslet design. It was built by reusing many parts from steam locomotives. Eventually redundant to Sentinel's with hydraulic transmission, it was donated in 1976 to the Tyne and wear Museums Service by the work's later owner, the British Steel Corporation. No.10 operated its first demonstration goods trains on the line at the Rail 200 Gala weekend in 2025, and sees limited use since restoration.

=== Electric locomotives ===
==== Tyne and Wear Metrocar 4001 (BR Class 599) ====
Built in 1975 by Metro-Cammell in Birmingham, it was one of the first two prototype Metrocars constructed for the Tyne and Wear Metro, which opened in 1980. Alongside unit 4002, it was tested and later modified by the Hunslet Engine Company to match the standard fleet design, including the removal of its original front emergency exit. The articulated two-car unit, 27.8 metres long and equipped with four 185 kW traction motors powered by overhead 1,500 V DC electrification, provided seating for 64 passengers with additional standing capacity. Donated to the railway by Nexus, the Metro operator, on 11 September 2025 - 4001 is now displayed at the museum on what is part of the former Metro test track used during the late 1970s.

==== Harton Electric E4 ====
Electric locomotive No.E4 was built for the Harton coal system at South Shields. It was stored outside for many years, but after a successful lottery bid and sponsorship from the local Siemens Microchip Company it was restored to working order by using battery power rather than an overhead supply. The batteries are carried in a converted coal wagon. It is currently not operational due to the traction battery becoming life expired. The locomotive is now on static display in the museum with the converted coal wagon joining the demonstration coal train rake.

==== Motor Luggage Van 3267 ====
No. 3267 is the sole surviving example of the stock built-in 1904 for the Tyneside Electrics system, the first suburban electric railway in the country. The system used third rail power and trains formed into multiple units. The vehicle was one of two on the system fitted out as vans, with driving cabs at each end. They were used to carry fish and sundry goods, as well as acting as the locomotives for passenger services on the Riverside branch. After withdrawal in 1938, the two vans had their motors removed and were converted to de-icing vans, hauled along the system at night by steam locomotives. It has since been restored to NER livery, and is on static display in the museum, on loan from the National Railway Museum.

=== Coaches, wagons and departmental stock ===
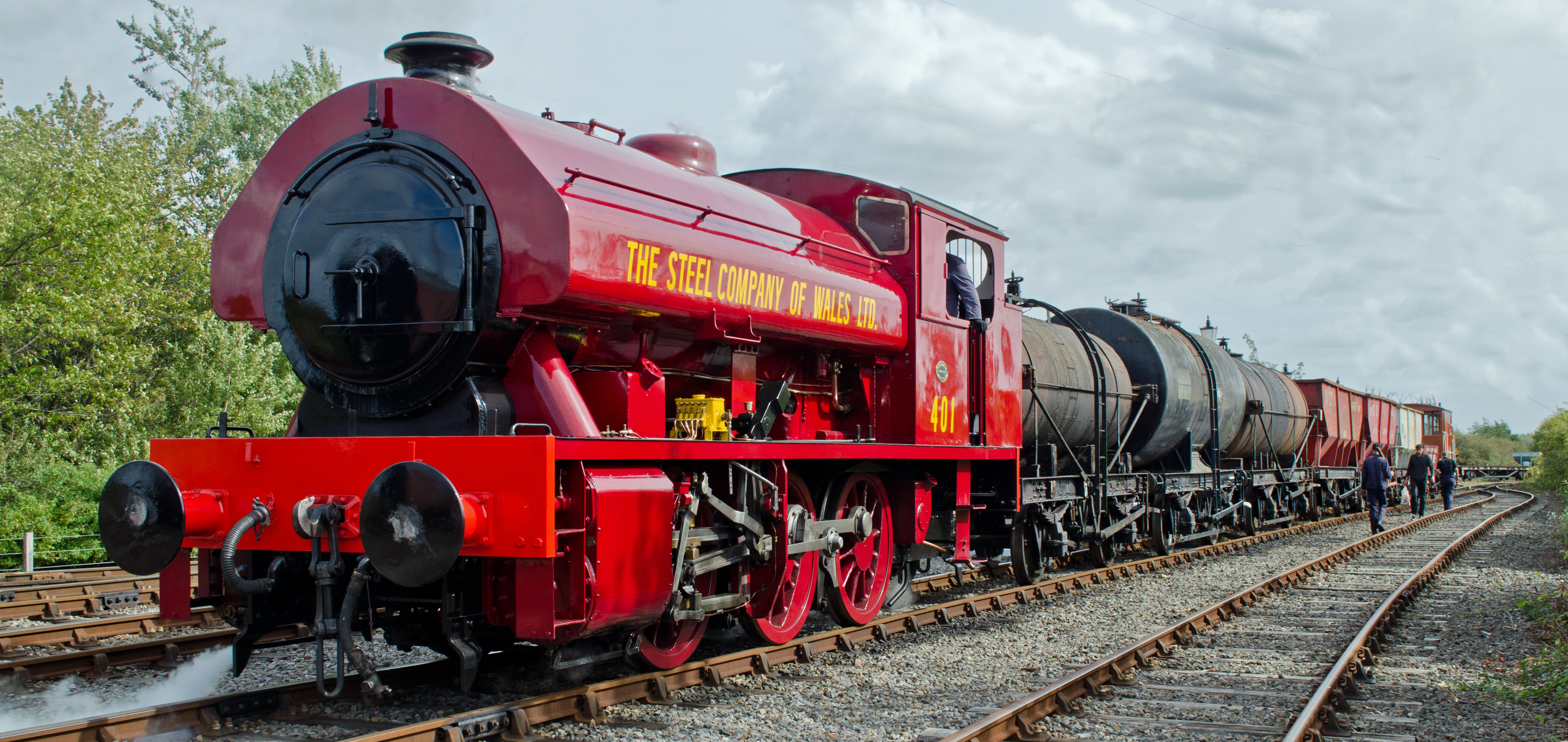
No.401 on mixed freight at Middle Engine Lane

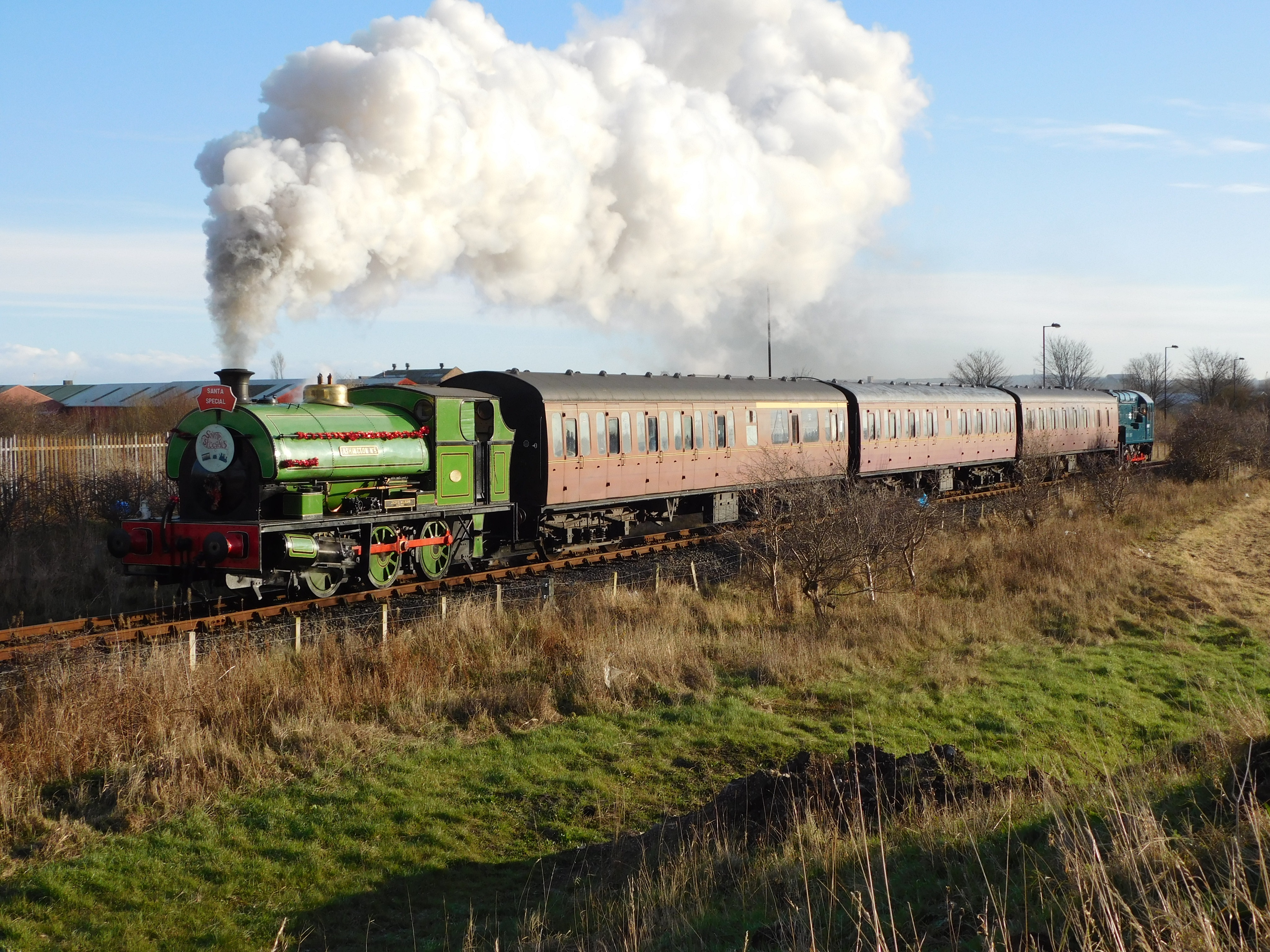
Ashington No.5 and No.08915 top and tailing Santa Specials

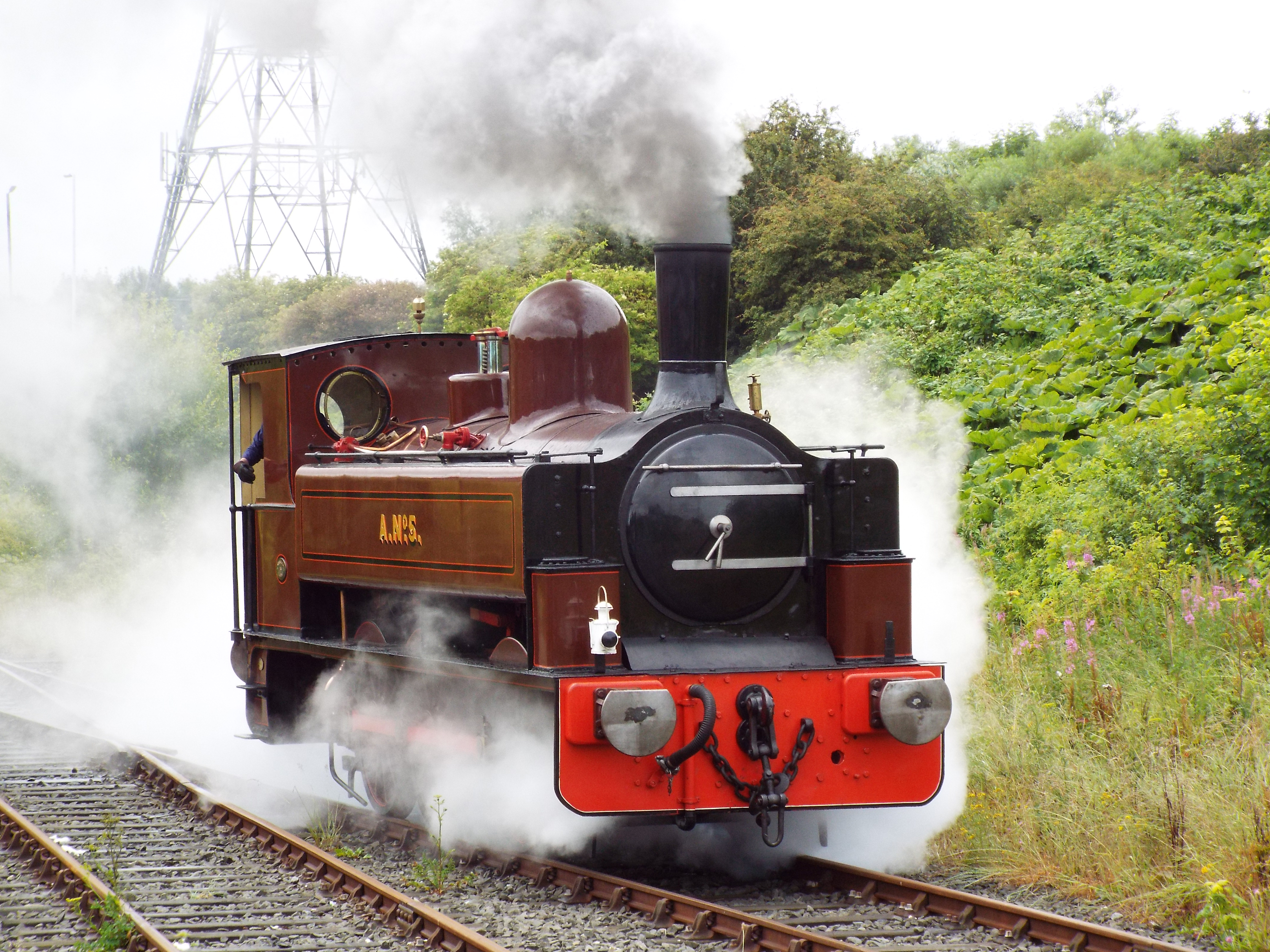
A.No.5 at Percy Main

The three ex-British Rail Mk1 carriages are used for the passenger trains. They were used on the Kings Cross suburban lines. They wear BR Midland Maroon Livery. They were preserved by the Bluebell Railway between 1973 and 1975, and were obtained by the museum in 1986.

The rail crane (No.DRS 81140, prev. DB 966401, 81/001, 24247) was designed for British Rail. It has been paired with an ex-LNER wagon converted to a crane runner (No.DE321051, ex-6282, 70130E) It is currently stored outdoors until such a time as it can be overhauled.

Nearly every wagon in the yard sees regular use, either on demonstration freight trains or permanent way/engineering trains. The 20-ton Dogfish Ballast Wagon, Salmon Rail Carrier and 20 Ton wooden brake van were all used in the construction of the railway in the late 1980/early 1990s.

The four-plank wagon was built in 1927 as an oil tank wagon for a private owner, presumably an industrial railway. It had the registration number LMSR 103136. It was later reduced to its underframe and sold to the Metro for use on the test track. Having been left on the site, the museum inherited it. They converted it into a four-plank open wagon for use as the carrier for the batteries needed to power the railway's electric locomotive E4. It has been given a fictitious brown livery and markings of "No.103 Boldon Colliery" on one side and "No.136 Whitburn Colliery" on the other.

The 12-ton Vanfit goods van has been converted into a Tool Van which houses an electrical generator.

The TTP flat wagon was built as a Tank Wagon for a private owner. In 2019 it was repainted to resemble a match wagon to be paired with 03078.

The other four-wheel flat wagon is a former overhead wire drum carrier used in the electrification of the East Coast Mainline, it sat at Heaton TMD for many years and was donated to the railway in late 2019. The wagon is currently undergoing restoration as a conflat wagon.

Each of the three 21 ton coal hopper wagons are privately owned. No.722 and No.6555 arrived in early 2020 from the Ribble Steam Railway, No.B415776 arrived in 2018 from the North Yorkshire Moors Railway.

Lambton Van 21 arrived in August 2020 from the Embsay and Bolton Abbey Steam Railway and is privately owned. The wagon has been moved in to the carriage and wagon shop for re planking.

The former BR Petroleum tank wagon arrived in early 2019 from the Middleton Railway. The other two tank wagons are privately owned and arrived in early 2020 from the Ribble Steam Railway.

The 5 ton Type BD van and 12 ton Shocvan are stored in the open, as bodies only, i.e. demounted from their chassis.

== Transport ==
The museum site includes a free car park. Bus stops on Middle Engine Lane itself provide direct connections west to Haymarket bus station in Newcastle or east to Blyth bus station via Whitley Bay. Other bus stops on Atmel Way in the adjacent Cobalt Business Park provide other connections, including to the two nearest Metro stations - Percy Main five minutes away to the south and Northumberland Park ten minutes away to the north (on the southern and northern sections of the North Tyneside loop, respectively).

Nearly all of the railway is paralleled by the National Cycle Route 10, which continues north from Middle Engine Lane along the alignment of the former railway to Backworth. Near the southern end, at the crossing with the A193 Wallsend Road the cycle route diverges from the railway to head south east, past Percy Main Metro, on its way to meet the east–west running National Cycle Route 72 which shadows the River Tyne.

On days when passenger services are in operation, the museum can also be accessed by joining the trains at the southern terminus, Percy Main Metro being around a 300m walk away from the platform through the residential estate of the same name.
