= Silverlink Shopping Park =

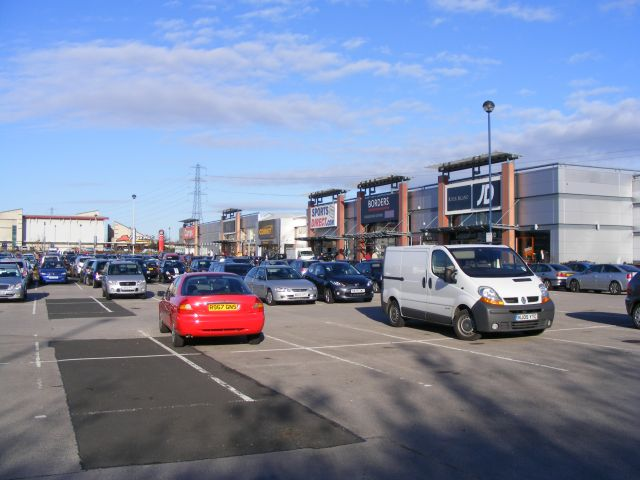
- Silverlink Shopping Park as it appeared in 2009
- Location: Wallsend, Tyne and Wear
- Coordinates: 55.0120°N 1.4949°W
- Opened: c. early 1990s
- Previous names: Silverlink Retail Park
- Developer: Crown Estate
- Num. of stores: 20+
- Num. of anchor tenants: 2 (M&S, Next)
- Parking: 927 spaces
- Website: www.silverlinkshoppingpark.co.uk

The Silverlink Shopping Park is a retail park in North Tyneside, England containing more than 20 stores with retail accommodation of 208,000 square feet (19,300 m^{2}). It was developed by the Crown Estate, has 927 car parking spaces, and has an annual footfall of 7.2 million.

== History ==
It was initially known as Tyneside Retail Park before becoming Silverlink Retail Park in the mid-1990s, taking the same name as the neighbouring Silverlink Industrial Estate. The Silverlink name is derived from the Silver Link locomotive that was once housed at the nearby North Tyneside Steam Railway museum. (Note: Although this was actually the preserved Bittern of the same class in the Silver Link livery as Silver Link had been scrapped in the 1960s)

The 9-screen multiplex Odeon cinema on the site opened in 1999, was upgraded in 2015, and has an IMAX screen and uses RealD 3D technology.

A £30 million extension was added to the shopping park in the late 2010s adding 4 additional retailers. That extension location had previously been a Travelodge hotel (formerly known as Europa Lodge and Moat House Hotel), who relocated to Cobalt Park.

== Retailers ==
Retailers on the park include Bensons for Beds, Boots, Currys, Halfords, Hobbycraft, H&M, JD Sports, Marks & Spencer, New Look, Next Home & Garden, OneBelow, River Island, ScS, Sports Direct, Sofology and Wren Kitchens. Most recently, EE working alongside BT have opened a store at the centre of the main parking area. There is a cinema operated by Odeon to the north of the park. Restaurants currently on the park include Costa Coffee, McDonald's, Nando's, Five Guys and wagamama.

Previous tenants have also included Comet, Wilko, Northern Electric, Outfit and Poundworld.

== Location ==
The adjacent roundabout linking the A19 and A1058 roads was upgraded using a triple-decker construction in the late 2010s at a cost of £75 million. The retail park is located to the south of Cobalt Business Park and North Tyneside Steam Railway. Buses run regularly from Newcastle upon Tyne and the surrounding areas. The shopping park is located between the two east–west lines of Tyne and Wear Metro's Yellow Line coastal loop and as such the park has been a candidate location for extending the rail line to serve.
