= Neil Woodford =

English fund manager (born 1960)

Neil Woodford CBE
- Born: Neil Russell Woodford; 2 March 1960 (age 66)
- Education: University of Exeter; London Business School
- Occupation: Former fund manager
- Known for: Collapse of Woodford Equity Income, one of the largest British Investment funds

Neil Russell Woodford CBE (born 2 March 1960) is an English former fund manager and the founding partner of Woodford Investment Management and the author of Woodford Views.

== Early life ==
Woodford was brought up in Berkshire and attended Maidenhead Grammar School. His father was a printer. He graduated in Economics and Agricultural Economics from the University of Exeter in 1981.

== Early career ==
Woodford began his career with the Reed Pension Fund and TSB. In 1987 he became a fund manager with Eagle Star, then moved to Invesco Perpetual in 1988. He has also pursued postgraduate studies in Finance at the London Business School.

== Invesco Perpetual ==
Woodford ran the Invesco Perpetual Income, and Invesco Perpetual High Income funds, with respectively £10.36 billion and £13.64 billion in assets. Woodford was vocal in opposition to the 2012 proposed merger between British defence company BAE Systems and EADS, the European aerospace group, warning that unless there was a “substantial change” in BAE’s strategy, Invesco would have to consider “all options open to us”.

Woodford gained a reputation as Britain’s best fund manager during his 25 years at Invesco, where he avoided the worst effects of the 1990s dot-com bubble and the 2008 financial crisis. He regarded himself as an active, long-term investor, holding shares for an average of about 15 years.

== Woodford Investment Management ==
In April 2014, Woodford left his role as head of UK equities at Invesco Perpetual to set up Woodford Investment Management LLP. In April 2015, he launched Woodford Patient Capital Trust, a listed investment trust. Woodford Investment Management launched a second Equity Income Fund in April 2017, LF Woodford Income Focus. Woodford owned 29% of the ill-fated Utilitywise.

In March 2019, after two years of poor performance during which fund assets contracted by more than £5 billion, the Sunday Times carried out an investigation into the fund. It found the fund held less than 20% of its assets in FTSE 100 companies compared to over 50% when it was created, and over 20% of its assets were in small Alternative Investment Market companies. On 4 June 2019 trading in Woodford Investment Management’s largest fund (the Woodford Equity Income fund) was suspended. There had been large withdrawals of funds by many investors. Following this, St. James's Place plc terminated Woodford's contract to manage three of its funds, valued at £3.5 billion. The FCA has launched a formal investigation into the suspension. A Woodford spokesperson said: “We can confirm we have been contacted by the FCA, regarding its investigation relating to the events that led to the suspension … and will be co-operating fully with its investigation.”

On 15 October 2019 the fund board announced that Woodford's flagship fund, Woodford Equity Income Fund (WEIF), was to be shut down and Woodford had been removed as investment manager. The following day Woodford announced he would resign from his remaining investment funds and close his investment company in an orderly fashion. Around 300,000 people had invested in the WEIF, including 130,000 through the Hargreaves Lansdown investment site.

On 3 June 2022, a case was filed against the fund's administrators, Link Fund Solutions, claiming that they failed to properly supervise the investments. Further claims against Link were made by Harcus Parker, representing 7,000 investors and seeking an estimated £18m in damages, and Leigh Day, representing 12,000 investors. In April 2023, following a Financial Conduct Authority investigation, the administrators agreed to pay up to £235m to help regulators compensate customers who had lost their savings. The first payments were made in March 2024.

In October 2022, claims firm RGL also filed a High Court claim on behalf of an initial 3,200 investors against Hargreaves Lansdown, which had promoted the WEIF. By November 2024, RGL said the number of people suing Hargreaves Lansdown had almost doubled in two years, to over 5,000, and could reach 10,000 by March 2025. Hargreaves Lansdown had rejected the first set of RGL claims in 2022 "for lack of a substantive basis of claim".

In August 2025, the FCA fined Woodford nearly £6m, and banned him from holding senior manager roles and managing funds for non-professional investors. The FCA also fined his fund, Woodford Investment Management (WIM), £40m. As both Woodford and WIM appealed against the decisions, the FCA's findings are provisional. The FCA said Woodford and WIM had made "unreasonable and inappropriate investment decisions".

== Woodford Views ==
In April 2024, Woodford launched a new website, Woodford Views, to provide economic, political and investment commentary.

== Personal life ==
Woodford's second marriage is with Madelaine White; they have two children. Woodford lives in Dorset with a second home in Salcombe. Woodford and his wife are keen horse riders and amateur showjumpers.

== Honours ==
In June 2013, in the 2013 Birthday Honours, Woodford was appointed a Commander of the Order of the British Empire (CBE) for services to the economy. In July 2016, he was awarded an honorary fellowship by the London Business School.
