= Schroders Capital Global Innovation Trust =

British investment trust

Schroders Capital Global Innovation Trust plc
- Formerly: Schroders UK Public Private Trust and Woodford Patient Capital Trust
- Type: Public company
- Traded as: LSE: INOV
- Industry: Investment
- Founded: 2015; 11 years ago
- Headquarters: London, United Kingdom
- Key people: Susan Searle (Chairperson)
- Website: Official site

Schroders Capital Global Innovation Trust plc, formerly Schroders UK Public Private Trust and before that Woodford Patient Capital Trust, is a British investment trust dedicated to long-term investments predominantly in the United Kingdom.

It is listed on the London Stock Exchange. The chairman is Susan Searle.

== History ==
The fund was established in 2015 and was managed by Woodford Investment Management led by Neil Woodford until December 2019 when the fund came under the management of Schroders.

Among other early stage investments, through its portfolio company, Industrial Heat, the trust is the world's largest institutional investor in the pseudoscientific cold fusion technology.

The trust changed its name from Woodford Patient Capital Trust to Schroders UK Public Private Trust on 16 December 2019 and was renamed to Schroders Capital Global Innovation Trust in April 2023.
