= LNER Class A4 4498 Sir Nigel Gresley =

Preserved LNER Class A4 locomotive

Sir Nigel Gresley
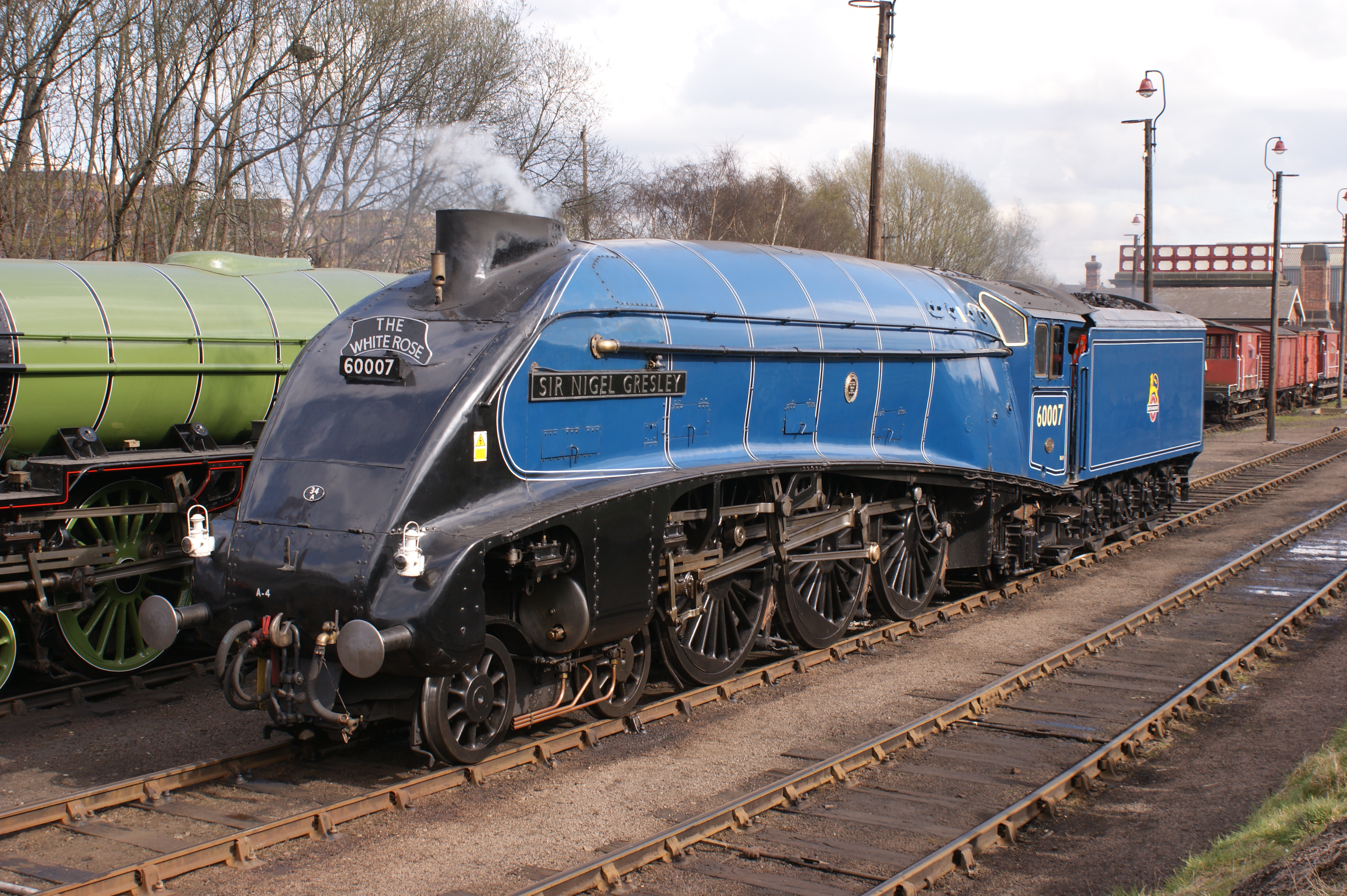
- 60007 at the Barrow Hill Roundhouse in April 2009
Type and origin
- Power type: Steam
- Designer: Nigel Gresley
- Builder: Doncaster Works
- Serial number: 1863
- Build date: 30 October 1937
Specifications
- Configuration
  - Whyte: 4-6-2
  - UIC: 2'C1h3
- Gauge: 4 ft 8 1/2 in (1,435 mm) standard gauge
- Leading dia.: 3 ft 2 in (0.965 m)
- Driver dia.: 6 ft 8 in (2.032 m)
- Trailing dia.: 3 ft 8 in (1.118 m)
- Boiler pressure: 250 psi (1.72 MPa)
- Cylinders: Three
- Cylinder size: 18.5 in × 26 in (470 mm × 660 mm)
- Loco brake: Steam
- Train brakes: LNER/BR: Vacuum; Now: Dual air and Vacuum
Performance figures
- Tractive effort: 35,455 lbf (157.7 kN)
Career
- Operators: London & North Eastern Railway; British Railways
- Class: A4
- Numbers: LNER 4498, LNER 7 (from 1946), BR 60007 (from 1948)
- Official name: Sir Nigel Gresley
- Withdrawn: 1 February 1966
- Restored: 1967
- Current owner: Sir Nigel Gresley Locomotive Preservation Trust
- Disposition: Operational, mainline certified

60007 Sir Nigel Gresley is an LNER Class A4 4-6-2 ("Pacific") steam locomotive built at Doncaster Works in 1937 to a design of Sir Nigel Gresley for operation on the London and North Eastern Railway (LNER). The locomotive holds the post-war speed record for steam locomotives on British Railways. The locomotive was withdrawn from service in 1966 and purchased for preservation the same year; it is one of six A4s to be preserved.

== Liveries ==
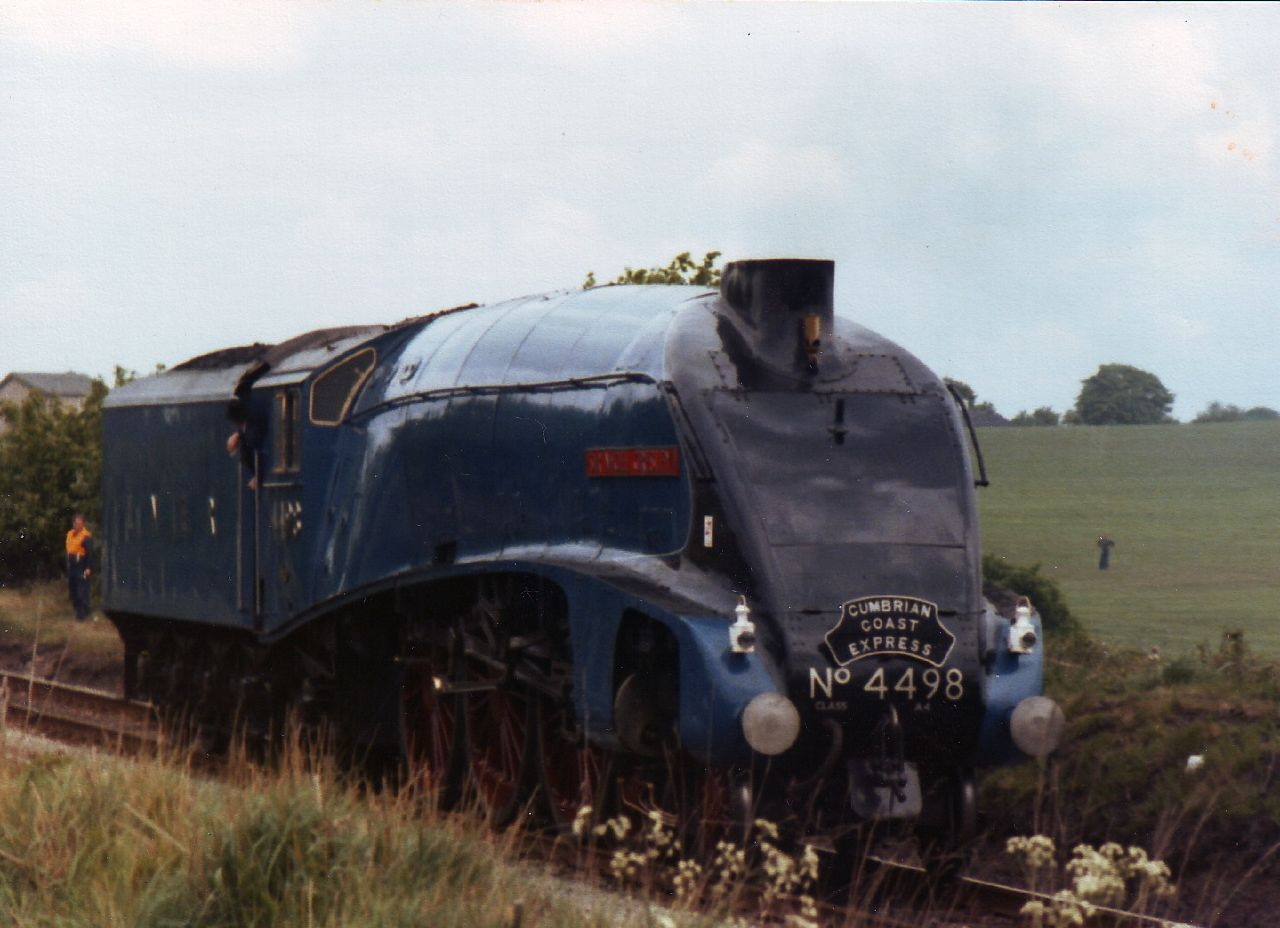
At the Rocket 150 celebrations in May 1980

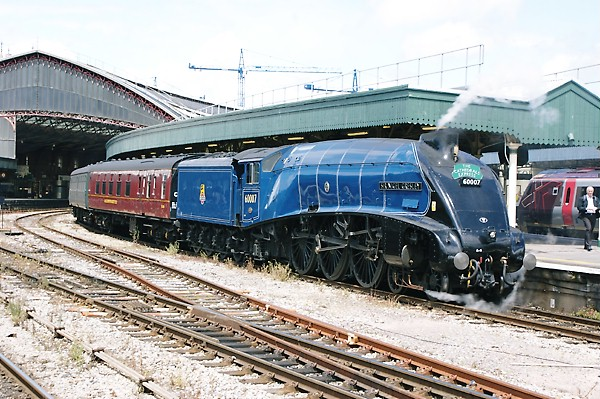
60007 at Bristol Temple Meads station in July 2008

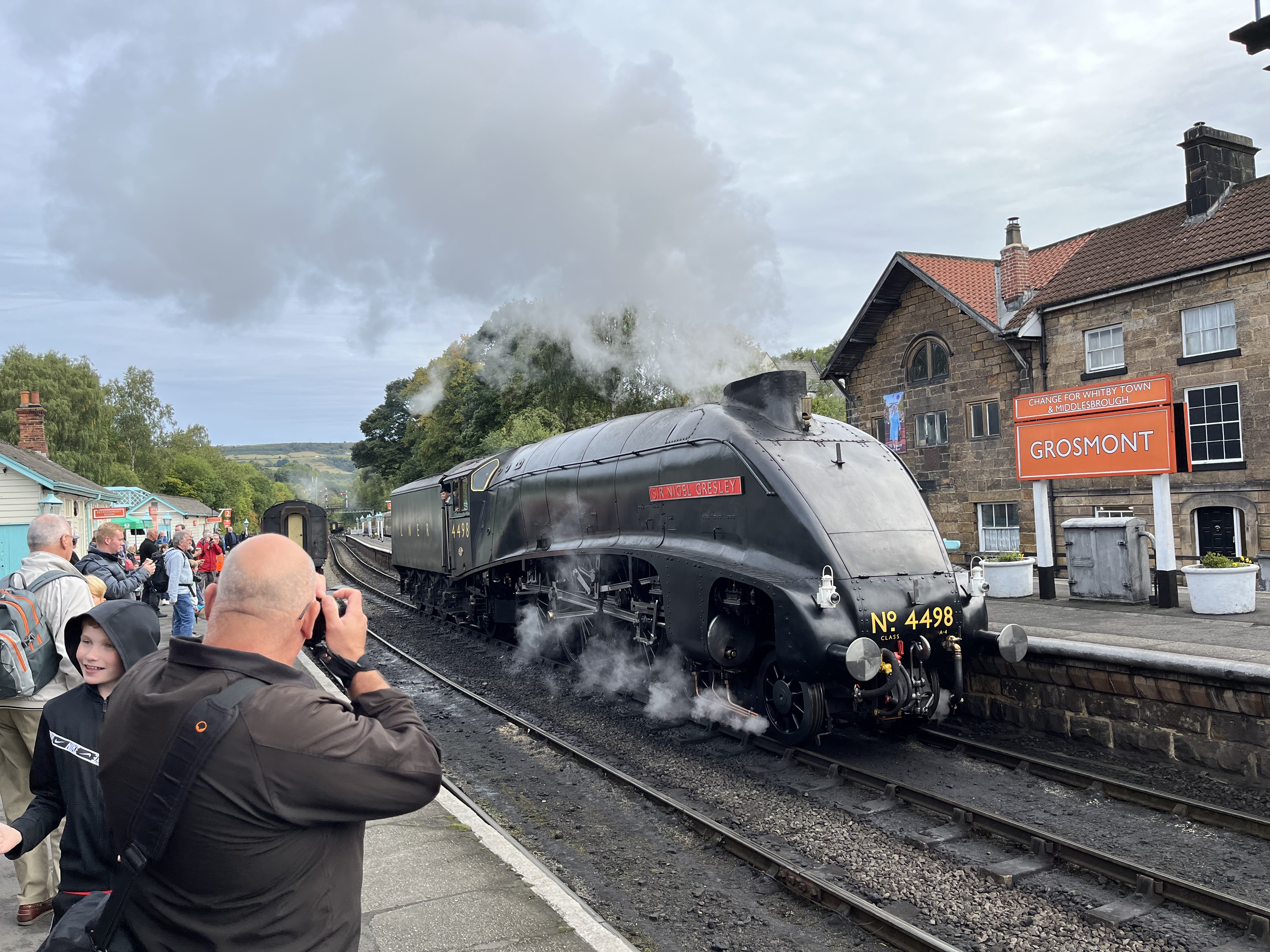
60007 in Wartime Black livery at Grosmont in September 2022

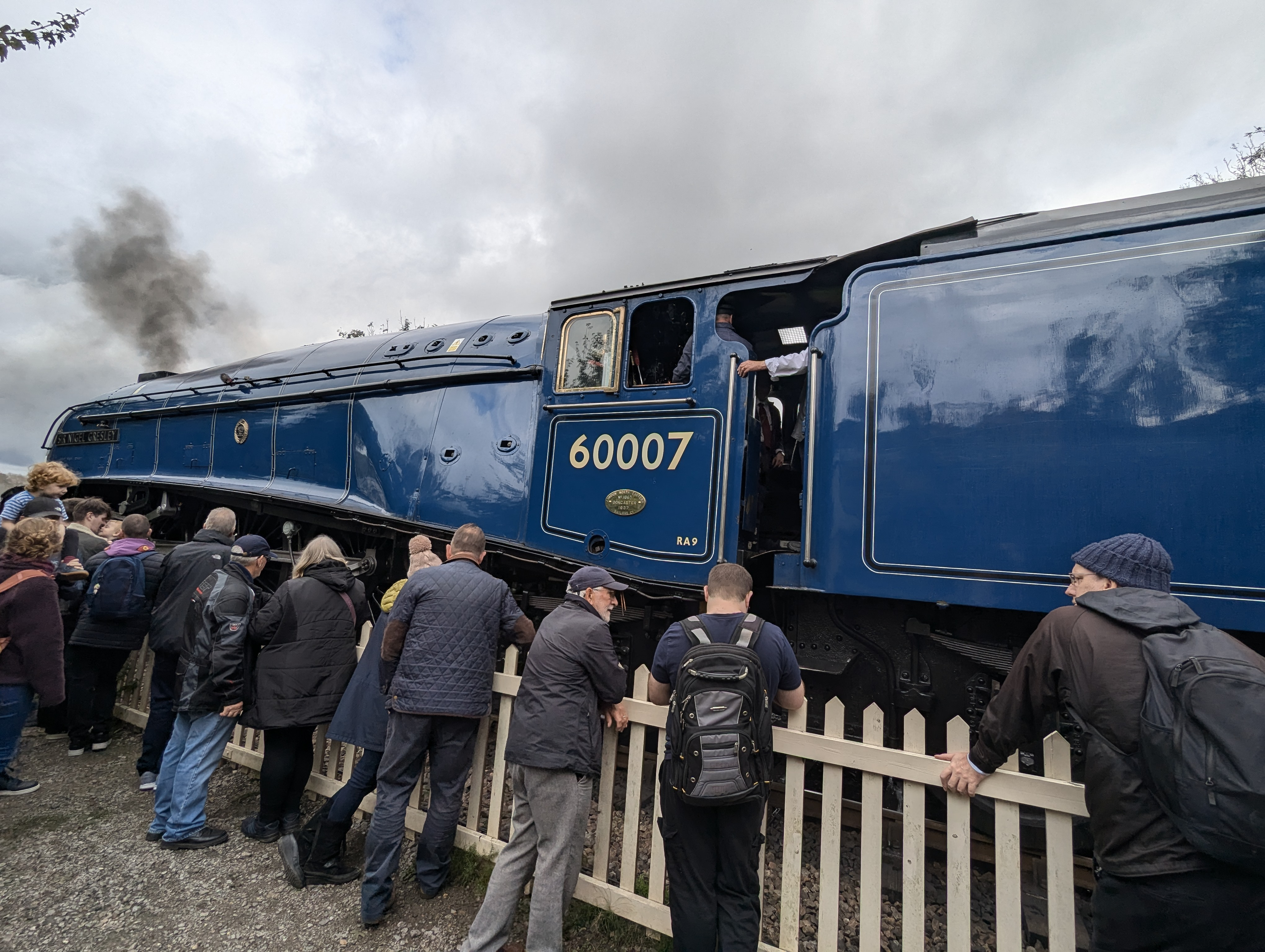
At the Bluebell Railway heritage line in West Sussex, October 2024

As with the other members of the 35-strong class, Sir Nigel Gresley wore many liveries throughout its career. It was released to traffic on 30 October 1937 in LNER Garter Blue. New numbers and letters for the tender in stainless steel were added in a general overhaul 16 January 1939. Sir Nigel Gresley was repainted into wartime black with LNER markings and had its streamlined side-skirts removed on 21 February 1942. The next repaint was into Wartime Black with NE (North Eastern) markings on 20 October 1943, as a cutback. to save labour costs during wartime. After the war, Sir Nigel Gresley regained LNER garter blue livery with red/white lining on 6 March 1947, albeit without its streamlined side-skirts

With the formation of British Railways came new liveries and another repaint. Sir Nigel Gresley was painted into British Railways Express Passenger Blue with black and white lining on 27 September 1950. The final livery change was into British Railways Brunswick Green livery on 17 April 1952, a livery it carried until its withdrawal. In preservation, Sir Nigel Gresley wore an LNER Garter Blue livery similar to the livery it carried pre-war (with stainless steel letters, no side-skirts, and numbered 4498) from 1967 until 1995, when it gained its British Railways Blue livery as BR No. 60007. This livery was retained between its 2006 and 2015-2022 overhauls. Prior to the locomotive returning to steam in 2022, the BR Blue livery was voted as the livery that the locomotive would ultimately wear. However, upon completion of its 2022 overhaul, it entered service in LNER Wartime Black as 4498. The locomotive remained in Wartime Black until January 2023 when it was again unveiled in its now iconic BR Blue.

== Technical details ==
As with the earlier LNER A4 Pacifics, Sir Nigel Gresley was built with single chimney and side valances covering the wheels. The valances were removed to aid in maintenance on 21 February 1942. Sir Nigel Gresley gained its double chimney and Kylchap double blastpipe on 13 December 1957. 60007 also gained AWS equipment on 27 September 1950. A Smith-Stone type speed recorder was fitted on 30 June 1960.

Sir Nigel Gresley has had twelve boilers in its career: 8961 (from new); 8946 (from 4483 Kingfisher), 21 February 1942; 9489 (new boiler), 6 March 1947; 29271 (from 60024 Kingfisher), 27 September 1950; 29319 (new build), 17 April 1952; 29306 (spare), 19 October 1953; 29321 (from 60010 Dominion of Canada), 12 March 1955; 29314 (from 60026 Miles Beevor), 13 April 1957; 29324 (from 60015 Quicksilver), 13 December 1957; 29331 (new build), 16 April 1959; 27970 (new build), 7 October 1960 and finally 27966 (from 60016 Silver King), 25 October 1962.

Sir Nigel Gresley had two tenders in its career: 5329 from new build to 8 August 1943 and then 5324 from that time.

== Career ==
Built for the LNER in 1937, and the 100th Gresley Pacific built. Its Doncaster Works number was 1863. It was originally numbered 4498. It is a 4-6-2 locomotive to the same design by Sir Nigel Gresley as the more famous Mallard.

Locomotive 4498 was actually due to receive the name Bittern, originally suggested for 4492 (later Dominion of New Zealand). So the story goes, an LNER enthusiast who worked in the Railway Correspondence & Travel Society, realised in time that 4498 was the 100th Gresley Pacific locomotive and the suggestion was made that the locomotive be named after its designer. The name Bittern was later carried on 4464.

Sir Nigel Gresley was allocated to Kings Cross Top Shed from new. As LNER locomotive 7, it was reallocated to Grantham on 23 April 1944, but sent back to Top Shed on 4 June 1950. Top Shed kept 60007 until the depot was closed, then Sir Nigel Gresley was reallocated to New England shed on 16 June 1963. Sir Nigel Gresley was then allocated to St Margarets shed, to work the Edinburgh - Aberdeen trains, until final shed allocation was to Aberdeen on 20 July 1964.

Sir Nigel Gresley received a repaint at Doncaster Works 25 February 1938, and larger coal space was also provided as the locomotive was displayed at an exhibition in Manchester. Sir Nigel Gresley was also used for the opening of the Rugby Locomotive Testing Station from 23 August - 8 October 1948. 60007 was placed onto the rollers without her tender and run up to high speeds to monitor the coal and water usage of the locomotive.

Sir Nigel Gresley is the holder of the postwar steam record speed of 112 miles per hour (180 km/h) gained on 23 May 1959 and carries a plaque to that effect. As with Mallard's record, this was descending southward from Stoke Bank, but unlike Mallard's run which was a special attempt, this was with a full train of passengers returning from an excursion to Doncaster Works. The excursion exceeded 100 miles per hour (160 km/h) on two other occasions on the same day. As the nominated member of the British Transport Commission's Eastern area board, Alan Pegler was on the locomotive's footplate that day.

== Preservation ==
Withdrawn from service by British Railways on 1 February 1966, 60007 was targeted by the A4 Preservation Society, which was soon renamed the A4 Locomotive Society, to rescue the locomotive from the cutter's torch. This was achieved, and 60007 was moved to Crewe for refurbishment. Fellow A4 No. 60026 Miles Beevor was brought to the former LMS works after its own withdrawal with its driving wheels and side rods cannibalised for use on No. 60007 due to the latter's original drivers and rods being in very poor condition.

Returning to service following refurbishment in 1967 the engine was outshopped in its former LNER Garter Blue with its pre BR number 4498, the engine however didn't have the side skirts fitted. 4498 Worked its first preservation railtour on 1 April 1967 running from Crewe to Carlisle working a tour titled "The Inaugural Run of Sir Nigel Gresley", the outward route being via Ais Gill on the Settle and Carlisle Line and the return route being via Shap on the West Coast Main Line. Other trips included visits to places A4 pacifics had never visited before and some farewell runs to southern region steam on British Railways which saw the engine visit Southampton, Bournemouth & Weymouth in June 1967.

For a long period of its preservation, Sir Nigel Gresley was kept at Steamtown Carnforth, at the old locomotive depot. This was a prime location for her mainline operations, being the only mainline A4 after 1973 other than 60009 Union of South Africa. On the occasion of the 50th anniversary of Mallard's record run on 3 July 1988, the National Railway Museum assembled three of the four UK-based A4 Pacific locomotives at the museum, the first time this had ever been done in preservation. Early in July 2008, SNG joined its three sibling locomotives in the UK for a display at the National Railway Museum in York.

During 1994, Sir Nigel Gresley spent some time at the Great Central Railway then at the East Lancashire Railway. The locomotive then moved to the North Yorkshire Moors Railway in 1996, and is now based there. It is owned by Sir Nigel Gresley Locomotive Preservation Trust and operated by the A4 Locomotive Society on behalf of the trust.

In 2010, Sir Nigel Gresley underwent repair at the North Yorkshire Moors Railway after its winter overhaul in 2009/10 revealed that extensive work and repair was needed on the tubing, and since then the locomotive has had two other significant mechanical failures, though these were also resolved.

2013 marked the 75th anniversary of the record breaking run by 4468 Mallard on 3 July 1938 where the engine set the world speed record of 126 mph. To mark the occasion a series of events were planned at both the National Railway Museum in York & Locomotion in Shildon which saw all six surviving A4's reunited for the first time in preservation. Sir Nigel Gresley was placed on display alongside fellow British based A4's 4464 Bittern, 4468 Mallard and 60009 Union of South Africa. 4489 Dominion of Canada & 60008 Dwight D Eisenhower were also temporarily returned to Britain from their respective museums in America and Canada for the anniversary.

60007's boiler ticket expired in September 2015, and the locomotive was therefore withdrawn from service for another overhaul which was carried out in public view at the National Railway Museum in York. The boiler was sent to the Llangollen Railway for overhaul and was reunited with the locomotive frame on 7 November 2019. A decision in early 2020 by the NRM to close the workshop meant that the engine would need to vacate the site which was to be by July 2021. After being reassembled and moved from the NRM over to Holgate Carriage Works the engine was taken by road to Crewe Diesel TMD for Locomotive Services Limited to complete the overhaul in September 2021.

=== Fame in preservation ===
Following completion of her overhaul she was moved by road to the Severn Valley Railway in March 2022 which was documented on the Yesterday television programme Train Truckers to be run in, operating its first passenger-carrying service in April 2022.

== Models ==
Sir Nigel Gresley was the first tender locomotive model released in OO gauge, and produced in both clockwork and 3-rail 12V DC electric forms by Hornby for the launch of their new Dublo system in 1938. It was modelled with a heavy diecast 'Mazak' body and chassis, and finished in contemporary LNER Garter Blue livery with side skirts and tin-plate corridor tender. The casting was modified to remove the sideskirts on commencement of postwar production in 1947, when realistic Walschaerts valve gear was fitted to reflect the locomotive in early BR ownership.

Bachmann released several models of 60007; Weathered Single Chimney, Weathered Double Chimney and Pristine double chimney all in BR Express Passenger Blue. Hornby also released three models; one with a support coach and one without one, all having double chimneys and in BR Express Passenger Blue. Hornby sold their third model in 2013 for the Great Gathering Range along with the other surviving members of the class.

Hornby also marketed an N-gauge model of 'Sir Nigel Gresley' (as catalogue item 'N214'). This N-gauge model was actually manufactured by Minitrix of (the then) West Germany in 1983, as Minitrix article number '51-2946-00'.
