= Cobalt Park =

Business park located in England

Coordinates: 55.021°N 1.507°W

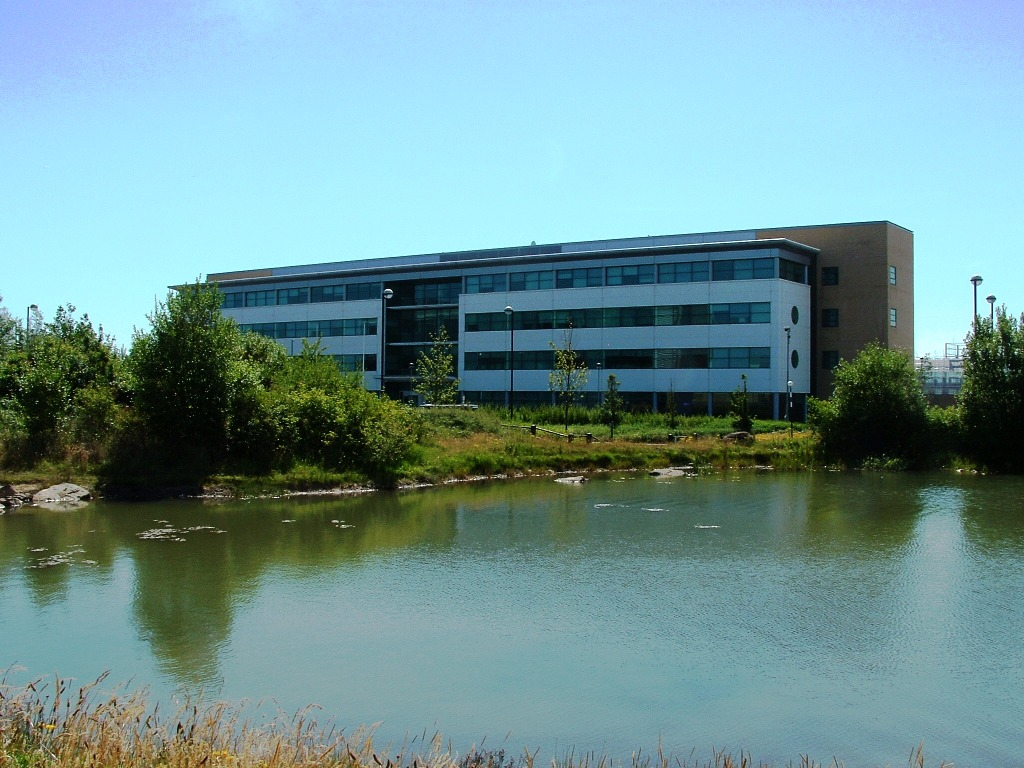
- P&G's offices on Cobalt Business Park
- Industry: Business park
- Founded: 1996; 30 years ago
- Headquarters: Wallsend, North Tyneside, United Kingdom
- Website: cobaltpark.co.uk

Cobalt Park is a business park located in North Tyneside, England. It is one of the largest business parks in the United Kingdom.

== History ==
Initially known as Hadrian Business Park (Note: Named after the nearby Hadrian's Wall to the south) plans for the area were devised in the early 1990s by the Tyne and Wear Economic Development Company. Work began on building Cobalt Park in 1996 when the site was purchased and it was initially to house businesses employing 5,000 people on a site of 140 acres (57 ha). Part of the development was made a designated Enterprise Zone in 1995. The region had previously been noted for its large mining industry and because of this the development had to secure 5 disused mine shafts that ran through the site. In 1997 Highbridge Business Park Limited (a joint venture between Highbridge Properties and Ashall Group) became developers of the park and the development took on its Cobalt name.

In 1998 construction of the first building, Cobalt 3, commenced and was completed in 1999. Over the following years more buildings were added. Additional expansion land was acquired in 2002 and 2007. The development consists of more than 29 buildings. As of 2016 more than 14,000 people are employed on the business park.

The CBX building was formerly part of a £1.1 billion Siemens Semiconductors factory that had been built in 1995/6 and opened by Queen Elizabeth II in May 1997. Siemens closed the plant in 1998, and spun off their Semiconductor business to Infineon Technologies in 1999. (Note: However, the North Tyneside site was not transferred to Infineon) The fabrication facility was transferred to Atmel in 2000 who restarted production at the site. After Atmel decided to reorganise their global factories, their 8-inch wafer fabrication equipment was sold to TSMC and the North Tyneside site itself was sold to the owners of Cobalt in 2007. A number of the buildings attached to the original semiconductors factory have since been demolished and replaced with office and data centre buildings, thus expanding the Cobalt Park site.

As part of the development a country park of 44 acres (18 ha), Silverlink Biodiversity Park, was created on site and declared a nature reserve in 2005. It had been built on the site of a former rubbish tip.

In 2025, the business park was named as a future location of Stargate UK, a partnership between US companies OpenAI and Nvidia, to deliver AI infrastructure. The deal was paused in April 2026 with OpenAI citing regulation and the rising costs of energy at the time.

== Businesses ==
Newcastle Building Society, North Tyneside Council and the Sage Group have their headquarters on the site. Newcastle Building Society had used office space at Cobalt since 2008 before moving out of their previous headquarters in Portland House in Newcastle City Centre in 2021. North Tyneside Council moved their headquarters to Cobalt from Wallsend Town Hall in 2008. Sage Group moved their headquarters from Newcastle Great Park in 2021.

Other businesses located on the park include Accenture, DNV, DXC Technology, EE, IBM, NHS, Leeds Building Society, Procter & Gamble, Santander and Siemens Gamesa. Previous tenants have also included Balfour Beatty, Barnardo's, Formica, G4S and Utilitywise. Retail tenants also include Aston Martin, Busy Bees Nurseries, Greggs, Jaguar Land Rover and Tesco. The site also has its own data centres, gyms, hotels (Travelodge and Village Hotel Club) and a hospital.

== Transport ==
The business park is located adjacent to the North Tyneside Steam Railway and Silverlink Retail Park. The business park is served by numerous bus routes and the nearby Northumberland Park Metro station. It is located near to the A19 and A1058 roads and is bordered on one side by a former 19th-century waggonway that is now used as a cycle path.
