= LNER Class A4 4464 Bittern =

One of the 35 built of the A4 steam engine class

Bittern
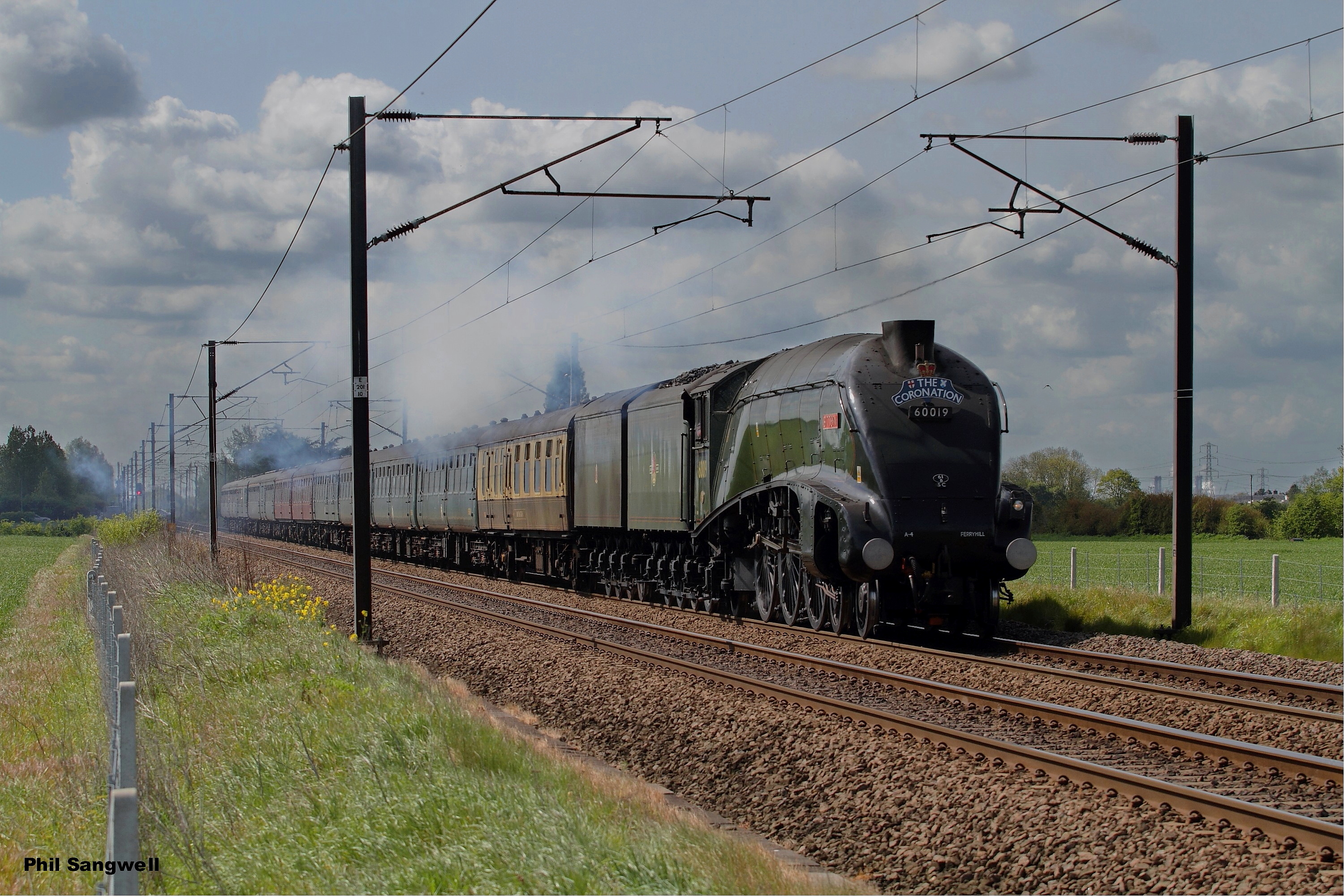
- 60019 Bittern running on the ECML with a second tender in 2010.
Type and origin
- Power type: Steam
- Builder: Doncaster Works
- Serial number: 1866
- Build date: 18 December 1937
Specifications
- Configuration
  - Whyte: 4-6-2
  - UIC: 2'C1h3
- Gauge: 4 ft 8 1/2 in (1,435 mm) standard gauge
- Leading dia.: 3 ft 2 in (0.965 m)
- Driver dia.: 6 ft 8 in (2.032 m)
- Trailing dia.: 3 ft 8 in (1.118 m)
- Boiler pressure: 250 psi (1.72 MPa)
- Cylinders: Three
- Cylinder size: 18.5 in × 26 in (470 mm × 660 mm)
- Loco brake: Steam
- Train brakes: LNER/BR: Vacuum; Current: Dual air and Vacuum
Performance figures
- Tractive effort: 35,455 lbf (157.7 kN)
Career
- Operators: LNER, British Railways
- Class: A4
- Number in class: 24 of 35
- Numbers: LNER 4464; LNER 19; BR 60019
- Official name: Bittern
- Withdrawn: 3 September 1966
- Restored: 2007
- Current owner: Jeremy Hosking
- Disposition: Under overhaul

4464 Bittern is a London and North Eastern Railway (LNER) Class A4 steam locomotive. Built for the LNER and completed on 18 December 1937 at Doncaster Works as works number 1866, it received number 4464. After that it was renumbered 19 on 16 August 1946 under the LNER 1946 renumbering scheme, and finally 60019 by British Railways on 10 October 1948, after nationalisation. Of the 35 strong class, it is one of six to survive into preservation but it is one of only two currently scheduled to be certified for mainline use.

In preservation, the locomotive has also worn the identities of a number of its scrapped classmates, including the first of the A4 class 2509 Silver Link and most recently as 4492 Dominion of New Zealand.

== Liveries ==
Like the other members of its class, Bittern has worn many liveries throughout its career. When released to traffic on 18 December 1937, Bittern was wearing the garter blue livery that was standard for LNER A4 Pacific locomotives at that time. On 14 November 1941 it was repainted into wartime black with LNER markings on the tender. On 22 May 1943 the tender was modified with just the markings NE. It has sometimes been said that this was to confuse wartime spies, but the generally accepted view is that it was to save scarce materials and labour by reducing the number of letters by half. It has also been said that the change was to satisfy the vanity of the new Chief Mechanical Engineer, Edward Thompson, who was a product of the former North Eastern Railway, but this claim is widely discounted. Bittern remained in black until 7 March 1947 when repainted in LNER post-war garter blue with extra red/white lining. Bittern was repainted next on 28 July 1950 into British Railways dark blue with black and white lining. The final repaint for Bittern was into British Railways green on 12 February 1952.

Bittern had some livery variations applied; some of the A4s had red backgrounds applied to their nameplates, which were normally black. Bittern was seen with a red background circa 1966. The green livery had variations. Normally the boiler bands were lined out except for the firebox boiler band, which was plain green. Bittern, and other Darlington based A4s received lining on the firebox boiler band as well.

Some A4s had their shed name marked on the right-hand (looking from the front) buffer. Bittern was marked with Gateshead circa 1949 and Ferryhill shed (Aberdeen) later in the 1960s.

== Technical details ==
Like most other A4s, Bittern was fitted with side valances and a single chimney from new. The valances were removed during an overhaul 22 September – 14 November 1941. Its double chimney with a Kylchap double blastpipe was fitted on 6 September 1957. AWS (Automatic Warning System) was fitted 13 December 1958. Bittern was fitted with a full-width bogie dust shield in 1950. The speed indicator was fitted 6 September 1960.

Bittern has had fourteen boilers in its career.

Bittern has had just one tender throughout its career, originally of the non-corridor design. During the major overhaul which returned the engine to traffic in 2007 the tender was rebuilt as a corridor version to allow extra flexibility of operations.

== Career ==
Initially Bittern was based at Heaton in Newcastle and hauled the famous Flying Scotsman train on the section between London King's Cross and Newcastle. Early in her career, Bittern suffered some collision damage, necessitating a general overhaul at Doncaster Works from 3–4 January 1938. Bittern was transferred to Gateshead on 28 March 1943. With World War II, the named expresses were cut back as the country went to war. Bittern lost her garter-blue paint for a wartime black and was required to pull longer-than-normal, and therefore very heavy, passenger trains. As the war continued the A4 locomotives were also to be seen hauling heavy freight and coal trains. This was not a task that the locomotives had been built for. The heavy loads and poor maintenance conditions took their toll, and by the end of the war the A4 locomotives were in a poor state.

With the end of the war and nationalisation came better maintenance and the A4 class saw a return to the high-speed expresses of the pre-war years. Now in BR green Bittern hauled the Talisman from King's Cross to Edinburgh. Bittern was transferred to St Margarets on 28 October 1963. The A4 revival was short-lived, as the steam-pulled services were replaced by diesel-hauled services and Bittern was moved to Scotland and put into storage. After a short period Bittern was moved to Ferryhill, Aberdeen on 10 November 1963 and ran to Edinburgh and Glasgow. This service only lasted three years. Bittern has the dubious honour of heading the last A4 Glasgow to Aberdeen and thus bring the curtain down on 30 years of service. Bittern was withdrawn on 3 September 1966.

When she was bought for preservation, 'Bittern' had several major problems, such as the frames being cracked quite badly. These problems were known to British Rail, but were only lightly repaired, since with the end of steam it would have been uneconomic to completely repair the engine. This in turn affected her life in preservation and required important repairs been done to restore her to mainline standard.

== Preservation ==
After Geoff Drury discovered that No. 60024 Kingfisher (the locomotive he originally wanted to buy) had firebox problems, he chose Bittern instead and he bought it on 12 September 1966. It initially operated from York depot (site of the National Railway Museum today) on various steam charters, but the cracked frames and other symptoms of its long career soon spelled an end to use in mainline service. Its problems were irresolvable at that time and it pulled its last excursion train in 1973. In consequence Drury bought LNER Peppercorn Class A2 60532 Blue Peter from British Rail in 1968.

Bittern and 60532 were moved to the Dinting Railway Centre, near Glossop. Neither locomotive did much running, and in late 1987 the NELPG took charge of both locomotives on long-term loan from the Drury family. While 60532 was moved to the Imperial Chemical Industries works at Wilton on Teesside, and restored to mainline running from December 1991; Bittern with its greater repair needs was cosmetically restored to represent pioneer and long-gone sister 2509 Silver Link. It was initially displayed at the Stephenson Railway Museum in Newcastle-upon-Tyne in this livery.

Silver Link was displayed at the National Railway Museum, York and on 3 July 1988 was displayed outside with 4468 Mallard and 4498 Sir Nigel Gresley. Mallard had just worked a charter train up from Doncaster, and Sir Nigel Gresley was discreetly used to make steam appear to come from Silver Link to give the impression it was in steam. 60009 Union of South Africa was unable to attend due to an overhaul. On the weekend of 5 July 2008, Bittern joined its three sisters for the first time ever on display at the National Railway Museum in York on the 70th anniversary of sister Mallard's run.

=== Preservation Return to Steam ===
In 1995, Bittern - disguised as Silver Link was moved to the Great Central Railway in Loughborough to undergo restoration to working order, but this reached only a partial stage of dismantling. In 1997, Bittern was bought by Tony Marchington, and based at the Southall Railway Centre alongside his other locomotive which was also being overhauled at the time, LNER Class A3 4472 Flying Scotsman. In 2000, after the over-budgeted £1 million restoration of Flying Scotsman was complete, Marchington sold Bittern to Jeremy Hosking, who moved it to the Mid-Hants Railway in Hampshire in January 2001, for full restoration. After many years and thanks to 21st century technology, on 19 May 2007 Bittern was steamed for the first time in 34 years. In authentic British Railways lined green livery and carrying its British Railways number, 60019, she hauled her first service train since the 1970s on 7 July 2007 after six years of restoration, numerous tests and modifications. She departed at 13:00 on 7 July 2007, during the Watercress Line's 'End of Southern Steam Gala', hauling their rake of dining coaches from Alresford to Alton. Since then Bittern has been 'run in' and has been used on normal services, Santa specials and on 21, 22 and 23 March 2008 ran as 'Spencer' from the Thomas The Tank Engine stories during the Watercress Line's Day Out with Thomas (it was also booked as 'Spencer' from 9–17 August 2008).

Bittern was then sent to Southall depot in London, where it was configured to run with its water tender and support coach, both having originally been used with Flying Scotsman. After that, it completed brake and speed tests on a run to Bristol and made its official return to mainline working on Saturday 1 December 2007 on a charter from London King's Cross to York. Since then has hauled several more railtours around Britain.

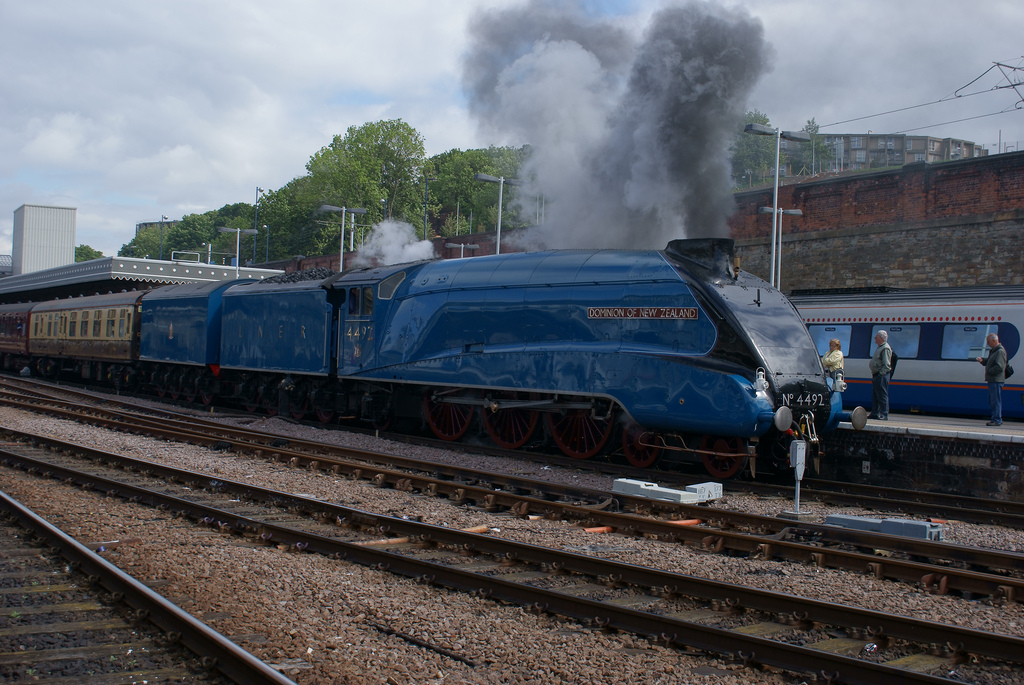
4464 Bittern masquerading as scrapped classmate 4492 Dominion of New Zealand with a railtour at Sheffield. Note the second tender.

On 25 July 2009, Bittern made a 188-mile run from King's Cross to York using a second tender to avoid the need to stop en route to take on water and change crews, carrying the headboard "The Brighton Belle" to publicise the launch of the Brighton Belle restoration project by the 5BEL Trust. With the first tender having a water capacity of 5,000 gallons and coal, and the second tender only used for carrying an extra 9,000 gallons of water, it was thought that this would give Bittern a range of about 250 miles; occasional stops are desirable in any case, for things such as mechanical checks and coal redistribution in the tender and firebox. A non-stop run on the East Coast Main Line had not been achieved since the 1968 King's Cross to Edinburgh hauled by 4472 Flying Scotsman, also with a second tender. In June in the Top Gear Race to the North, a run using the newly built locomotive 60163 Tornado had been achieved from London to Edinburgh on the ECML with water stops but no station stops, also a first since the 1968 run of No. 4472.

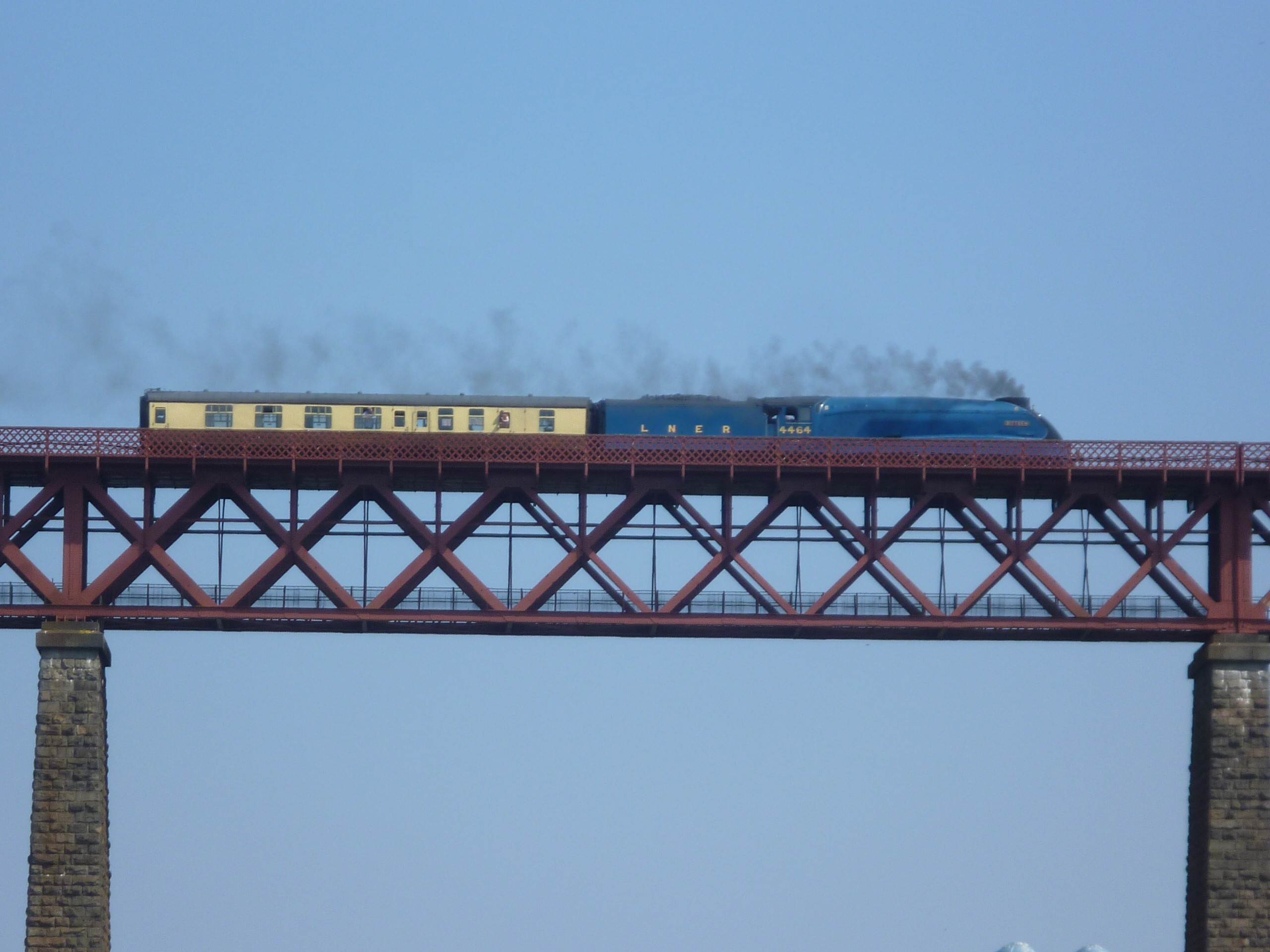
Bittern crossing the Forth Bridge

During the winter of 2010/2011 the locomotive received maintenance which included the cosmetic renaming and renumbering as scrapped classmate 4492 Dominion of New Zealand (BR number 60013). This conversion also included repainting the locomotive in LNER garter blue, the fitting of Gresley's original side valances (most of the valancing is from when the locomotive was masquerading as 2509 Silver Link) and the painting of its wheels in their original Coronation red colouring. As the original 4492 had a New Zealand Government Railways five-chime whistle fitted shortly after its introduction to service in 1937, a suitable whistle was borrowed from the Glenbrook Vintage Railway in New Zealand.

The original Dominion of New Zealand was one of five A4s named after Commonwealth countries to pull "The Coronation" service, so named to celebrate the coronation of King George VI and Queen Elizabeth in 1937. Two of the five "Coronation"-named A4s survive in preservation - 4489 Dominion of Canada at the Canadian Railway Museum in Delson, Quebec, and 60009 Union of South Africa, owned by John Cameron and which makes regular appearances on the main line.

The locomotive was due to remain in this livery for three years, however when 4464 emerged from its winter maintenance in 2012, The locomotive had reverted to its LNER identity as 4464 Bittern in gold leaf lettering.

To celebrate the 75th anniversary of sister locomotive Mallard completing its record breaking 126 mph run, Bittern ran three special charter runs along the East Coast Main Line, during which it became the first locomotive in preservation to be allowed to break the 75 mph speed limit that steam locomotives have on the UK mainline. Network Rail allowed 4464 to run up to 90 mph, as long as it passed some rigorous tests beforehand. All of these charters involved Bittern operating to and from York so it could still be displayed along with the five other preserved A4s (including Mallard) at the National Railway Museum.

On 29 June 2013, Bittern set a new speed record for a British preserved steam locomotive, and according to official timers on the footplate, it achieved a maximum speed of 92.8 miles per hour (149.3 km/h) near Arlesey, Bedfordshire on the first of its planned "high speed" runs, "The Ebor Streak" that ran from London King's Cross to York. The remaining two runs were originally scheduled for July, but the heatwave during the summer, as well as further weather issues later in the year, caused the services, the York-Newcastle "Tyne Tees Streak" and the York-London King's Cross "Capital Streak" to be rescheduled for 5 December and 7 December 2013 respectively. During the "Tyne Tees Streak" run, Bittern broke its own speed record set just a few months prior by reaching a maximum speed of 93 mph (149.7 km/h).

In 2014, Bittern was fitted with two commemorative plaques, similar to those worn by sister locomotives Mallard and Sir Nigel Gresley, in honour of its 90 mph runs. Just prior to the expiry of its mainline certificate on 1 January 2015, the locomotive was moved again to the Mid-Hants Railway, where it ran during 2015 before being withdrawn from service for a major overhaul at LNWR, Crewe.

As of May 2018, Bittern was stored in the queue of engines awaiting workshop space, as Crewe LSL was focused on getting 60532 and 70000 back to mainline service standard.

Bittern left Crewe in June 2018 and was transported by road to Margate, where it joined the Locomotive Storage Ltd facility at the former Hornby factory site. The company intends to create a railway heritage museum called The One:One Collection, which will showcase Bittern and other historic locomotives and vehicles.

=== Second Return to Steam ===
In May 2023 it was announced that Bittern's owners LSG had partnered up with Sir Nigel Gresley Locomotive Trust to form SNG Engineering, with the intention of working together on 4464's overhaul. In February 2025 Bittern was transferred to the Crewe workshops where the boiler would be removed before the chassis and frames move to a private site in Yorkshire.

== Models ==
Bachmann released a model of 60019 while it was still in BR Green. In 2013, Hornby released a limited edition of 1,000 models of Bittern as 60019 in Brunswick Green, with double tenders, as for its non-stop run from London to York in 2009. This was followed in 2014 by a very limited edition set of the six surviving A4s as 'The Great Goodbye' collection, including Bittern as 4464 in Garter Blue and with full valances. In 2019, Hornby are releasing limited edition models of engines in the 1:1 collection, including Bittern in LNER Garter Blue livery with two tenders and gold lettering, as preserved.
