= Energy broker =

Energy brokers assist clients in procuring electric or natural gas from energy wholesalers/suppliers. Since electricity and natural gas are commodities, prices change daily with the market. It is challenging for most businesses without energy managers to obtain price comparisons from a variety of suppliers since prices must be compared on exactly the same day. In addition, the terms of the particular contract offered by the supplier influences the price that is quoted. An energy broker can provide a valuable service if they work with a large number of suppliers and can actually compile the sundry prices from suppliers. An important aspect of this consulting role is to assure that the client understands the differences between the contract offers. Under some State Laws they use the term "Suppliers" to refer to energy suppliers, brokers, and aggregators, however there are very important differences between them all.

Energy brokers do not own or distribute energy, nor are allowed to sell energy directly to you. They simply present the rates of a wholesaler, or supplier.

== Product and services ==
Energy consultants offer far more than simply procuring energy contracts from supplier. In the UK across Europe extensive legislation and increasing pressure on businesses to reduce energy consumption have expanded the role of energy consultants and brokers.

Many now provide services that help businesses meet a range of compliance and accreditation requirements, including the Energy Savings Opportunity Scheme (ESOS), ISO 50001, ISO 14001, Energy Performance Certificates (EPCs) and Display Energy Certificates (DECs).

Energy consultants also help organizations reduce their energy consumption and carbon emissions in the line with national and international climate targets. Their services can include, energy health checks, energy audits, carbon-neutral, carbon offsetting and broader energy-saving consultancy.

Additional services such as arranging a power purchase agreement, energy export contracts can be procured as well as energy monitoring and reporting technology and solutions are also offered by energy consultants.

== Who do energy brokers serve? ==
In the USA, energy brokers can serve residential, commercial and government entities that reside in energy deregulated states. In the UK, and some countries in Europe, the entire market is deregulated.

== Fees/Commission ==
Energy brokers typically do not charge up front fees to provide rates. If an entity purchases energy through a broker, the broker's fee or commission is usually included in the unit rate the customer pays. This is referred to as an uplift. Some brokers will charge a fixed fee for their consulting services.

== Consulting ==
Not all energy brokers are consultants; However, the energy brokers who are also consultants will perform a more detailed analysis of a consumers' usage pattern in order to provide a custom rate, which typically results in more cost savings for the consumer. Typically, they do not need any more information than that of an energy broker, because they can pull usage information from the local utility company. There are some national energy brokers that use auditing teams to verify their client's invoices.
