= LNER Class A4 2509 Silver Link =

First of the LNER Class A4 locomotives

Silver Link
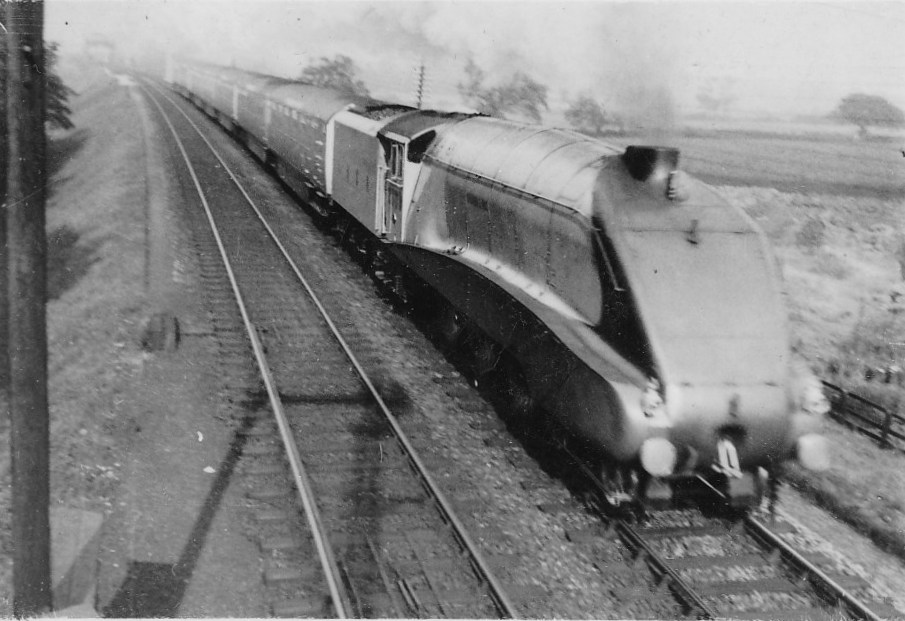
- Sliver Link on its second day of running the Silver Jubilee in 1935.
Type and origin
- Power type: Steam
- Builder: LNER, Doncaster Works
- Serial number: 1818
- Build date: September 1935
Specifications
- Configuration
  - Whyte: 4-6-2
  - UIC: 2'C1h3
- Gauge: 4 ft 8 1/2 in (1,435 mm) standard gauge
- Leading dia.: 3 ft 2 in (0.965 m)
- Driver dia.: 6 ft 8 in (2.032 m)
- Trailing dia.: 3 ft 8 in (1.118 m)
- Boiler pressure: 250 psi (1.72 MPa)
- Cylinders: Three
- Cylinder size: 18.5 in × 26 in (470 mm × 660 mm)
- Loco brake: Steam
- Train brakes: LNER: Vacuum
Performance figures
- Tractive effort: 35,455 lbf (157.7 kN)
Career
- Operators: London and North Eastern Railway, British Railways
- Class: A4
- Number in class: 1 of 35
- Numbers: LNER 2509, 14, BR 60014
- Official name: Silver Link
- Disposition: Scrapped at Doncaster Works in 1963

LNER Class A4 2509 Silver Link was a 4-6-2 "Pacific" Steam Locomotive built in 1935 for the London and North Eastern Railway. It was the first of the Streamlined Class A4s built to haul express passenger trains on the East Coast Main Line (ECML). No. 2509 was one of the four A4s to be painted in a special two-tone grey livery to pull a new train called the Silver Jubilee.

== History ==
Silver Link entered service with a demonstration journey departing from King's Cross Station on 27 September 1935. 2509 reached a top speed of 112.5 mph (181.1 km/h), breaking all previous UK records. The record provoked the LNER and their chief rival the London, Midland and Scottish Railway (LMS) into a highly competitive speed war, each attempting to outdo the other by building ever faster locomotives. The main protagonists were Sir Nigel Gresley, LNER's chief mechanical engineer, and his counterpart at LMS, Sir William Stanier.

=== Naming ===
Silver Link was named after a reference to love in Sir Walter Scott's poem The Lay of the Last Minstrel, which reads:

True love's the gift which God has given
To man alone beneath the heaven;
It is not fantasy's hot fire,
Whose wishes, soon as granted, fly;
It liveth not in fierce desire,
With dead desire it doth not die;
It is the secret sympathy,
The silver link, the silken tie,
Which heart to heart, and mind to mind,
In body and in soul can bind.

The engine was "officially named" (using its real name) in the opening scene of the 1937 comedy film Oh, Mr Porter!.

=== Scrapping and legacy ===
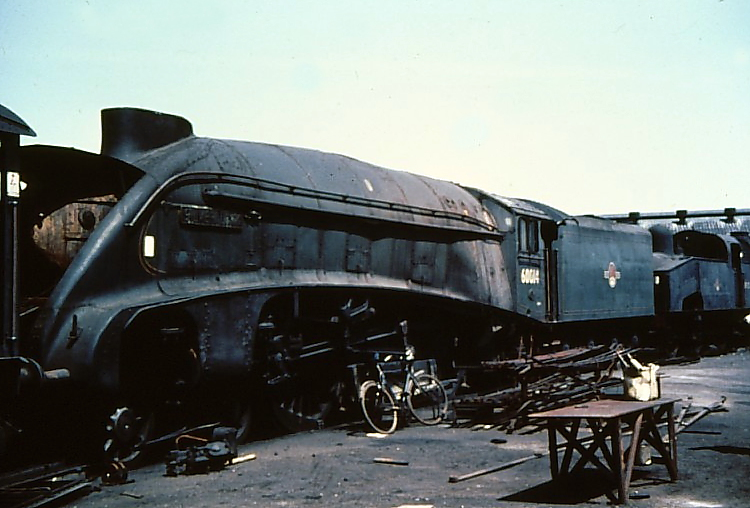
Silver Link at Doncaster Works in March 1963, shortly before it was broken up for scrap.

Allocated to Kings Cross shed, it was withdrawn from service on 29 December 1962 when the East Coast Main Line express services were taken over by Class 55 'Deltic' diesel locomotives. It was not preserved after withdrawal and was broken up for scrap at Doncaster Works on 7 September 1963, on the same site where it had been built nearly 28 years earlier. There was an attempt by Sir Billy Butlin to save the locomotive, but it was unsuccessful.

Two examples of the Silver Link nameplate are on display at the National Railway Museum, York, England.

The Silverlink area of North Tyneside is named after the locomotive; the name of the area was taken after another A4 locomotive.

Former classmate LNER 4464 Bittern was repainted in 1991 and disguised as 2509 Silver Link. It was moved around on static display in the early to mid 1990s. It was eventually reverted to its real identity as 4464 post 1995 as the locomotive was being dismantled for eventual operation.
