= Cartazzi axle =

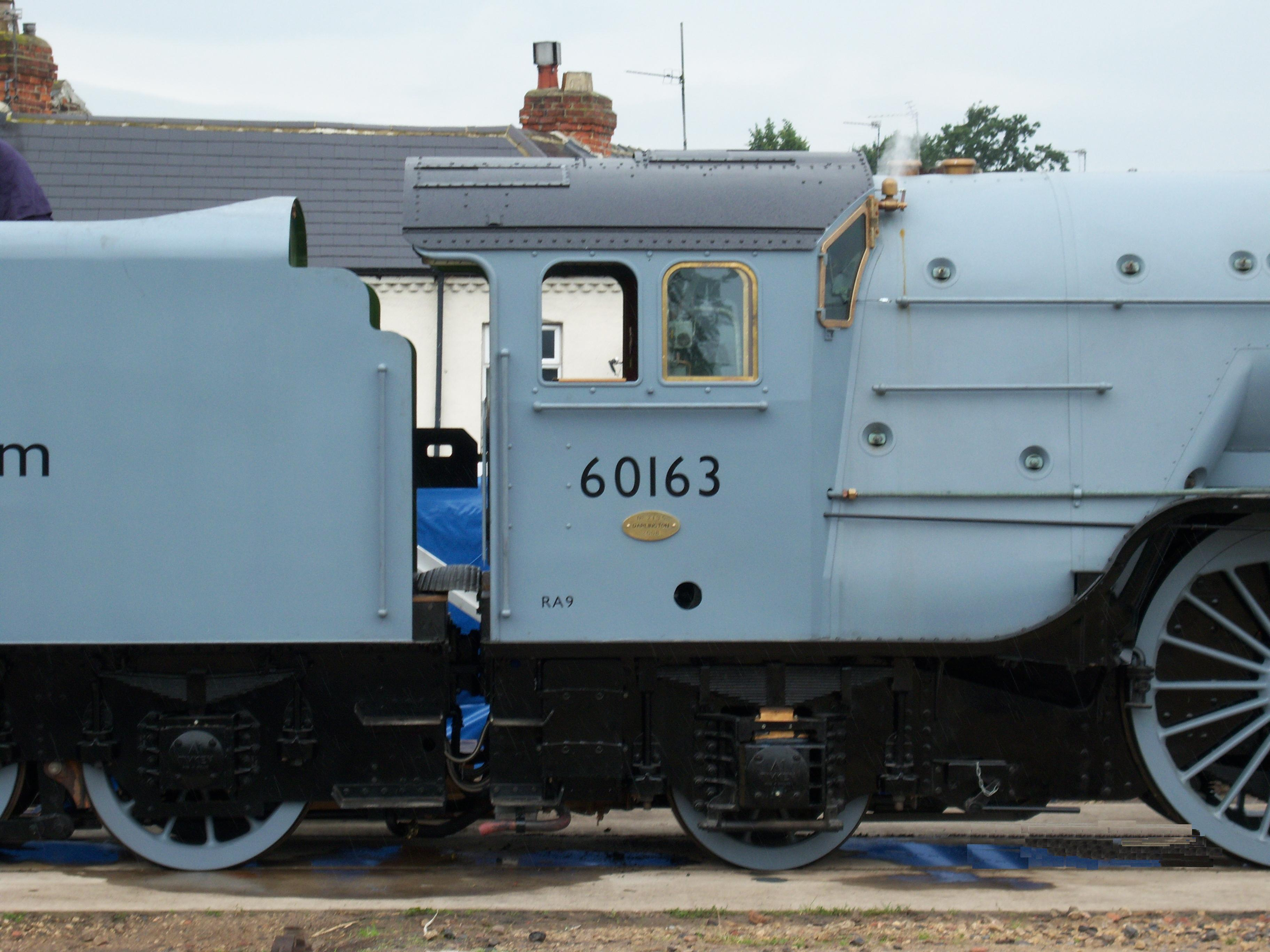
Cartazzi axle on LNER Peppercorn Class A1 60163 Tornado

A Cartazzi axle is a design of leading or trailing wheel support used worldwide. The design was used extensively on the former LNER's Pacific steam locomotives and named after its inventor F.J. Cartazzi, formerly of the Great Northern Railway. It should not be confused with a pony truck as it does not pivot at all. The axle does, however, have sideways play built in to accommodate tight curves. Cartazzi's design causes the weight of the locomotive to exert a self-centring action on the trailing wheels.

The Cartazzi design was also sometimes applied to driving wheel axles on longer wheelbase locomotives.

== Modelling ==
On small scale models the trailing wheels of Cartazzi-axled locomotives are often flangeless to allow negotiation of tighter, non-prototypical curves, or the Cartazzi axle has been replaced with a pony truck for the same reason.
