= LNER Peppercorn Class A1 60163 Tornado =

British steam locomotive built in 2008

LNER Class A1 Peppercorn 60163 Tornado
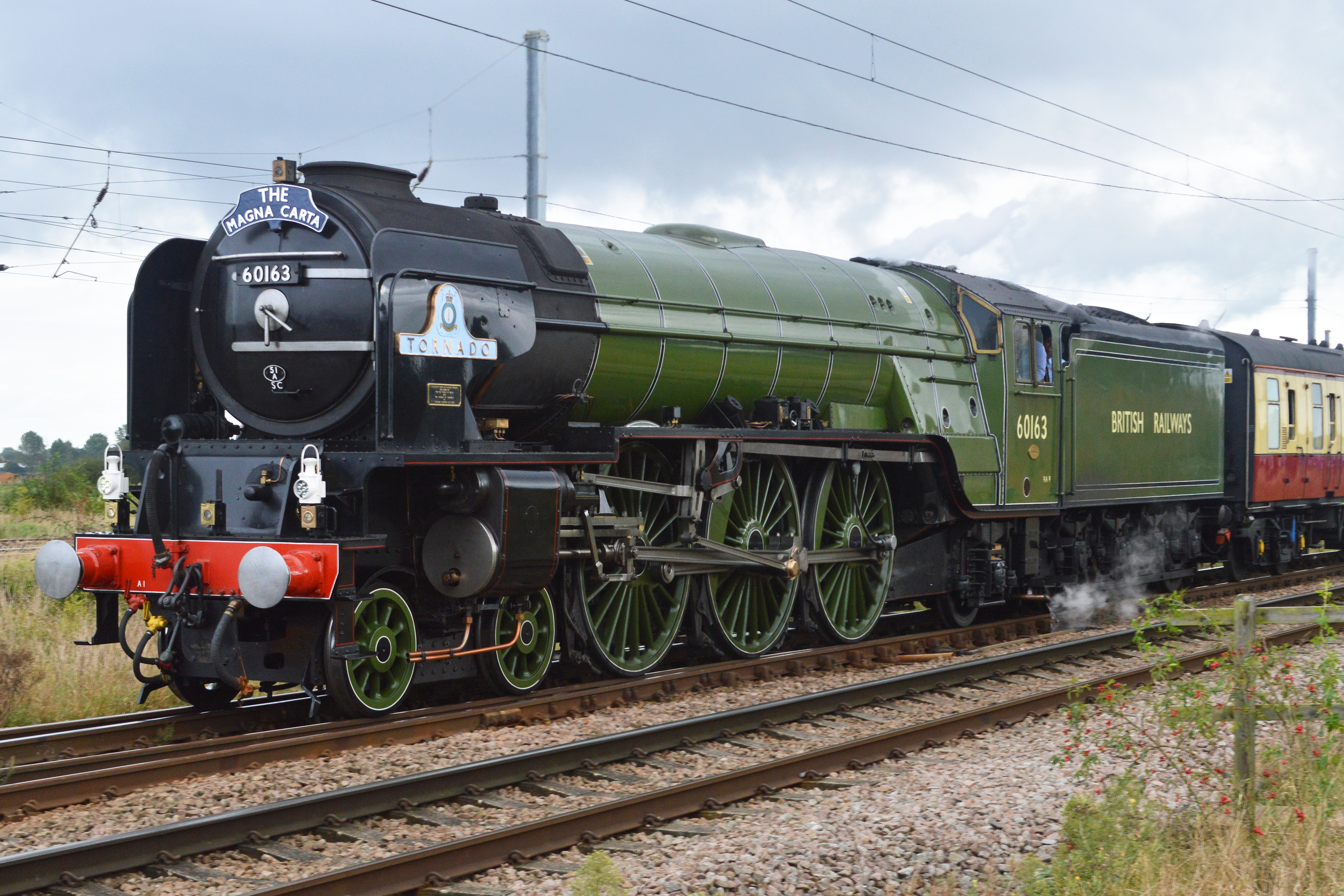
- Tornado on the East Coast Main Line in 2016
Type and origin
- Power type: Steam
- Designer: Arthur Peppercorn (original designer)
- Builder: A1 Steam Locomotive Trust
- Build date: 1994–2008
- Website: www.a1steam.com
Specifications
- Configuration
  - Whyte: 4-6-2
- Gauge: 4 ft 8 1/2 in (1,435 mm) standard gauge
- Leading dia.: 3 ft 2 in (0.965 m)
- Driver dia.: 6 ft 8 in (2.032 m)
- Trailing dia.: 3 ft 8 in (1.118 m)
- Length: 72 ft 11.75 in (22.24 m)
- Width: 9 ft 2.875 in (2.82 m)
- Height: 13 ft (3.96 m)
- Axle load: 22.1 long tons (22.5 t; 24.8 short tons)
- Adhesive weight: 66.55 long tons (67.62 t; 74.54 short tons)
- Loco weight: 105.2 long tons (106.9 t; 117.8 short tons)
- Tender weight: 60.9 long tons (61.9 t; 68.2 short tons)
- Total weight: 166.1 long tons (168.8 t; 186.0 short tons)
- Fuel type: Coal
- Fuel capacity: 7.5 long tons (7.6 t)
- Water cap.: 6,000 imp gal (27,000 L)
- Firebox
  - Grate area: 50.0 sq ft (4.65 m^{2})
- Boiler: Diagram 118; 6 ft 5 in (1.96 m) diameter 29 ft 2 in (8.89 m) length
- Boiler pressure: 250 psi (1,700 kPa)
- Heating surface
  - Firebox: 245.3 sq ft (22.79 m^{2})
  - Tubes: 1,211.6 sq ft (112.56 m^{2})
  - Flues: 1,004.5 sq ft (93.32 m^{2})
  - Total surface: 2,461.4 sq ft (228.67 m^{2})
- Superheater
  - Heating area: 697.7 sq ft (64.82 m^{2})
- Cylinders: 3
- Cylinder size: 19 in × 26 in (480 mm × 660 mm)
Performance figures
- Power output: 2,700 metric horsepower (2,000 kW; 2,700 hp)
- Tractive effort: 37,400 lbf (166,000 N)
Career
- Numbers: 60163 (display); 98863 (TOPS)
- Official name: Tornado
- Axle load class: Route availability 9
- First run: 29 July 2008
- Disposition: Operational, mainline certified

LNER Peppercorn Class A1 No. 60163 Tornado is a 4-6-2 "Pacific" steam locomotive completed in 2008 to an original design by Arthur Peppercorn. At the time of completion it was the first new build steam locomotive for the British mainline since 1960, and is the only Peppercorn A1 in existence as the final locomotive of the original class was scrapped in 1966.

The A1 Steam Locomotive Trust launched the project in 1990 and was financed through fundraising initiatives, public donations, and sponsorship deals. Construction began in 1994 at Darlington Works, England with other components manufactured elsewhere, most notably the boiler, which was constructed at Meiningen Steam Locomotive Works in Germany to meet modern EU regulations. Following testing on the Great Central Railway in 2008, Tornado was granted its mainline running certificate in January 2009 and has since worked heritage and mainline trains across Britain.

In 2017, Tornado became the first steam locomotive to officially reach 100 mph (160 km/h) on British tracks in over 50 years. It was withdrawn in 2021 for an extensive overhaul and returned to service in 2024. The success of Tornado led the A1 Steam Locomotive Trust to launch a new build project for another LNER locomotive, P2 Class 2007 Prince of Wales.

== Background ==
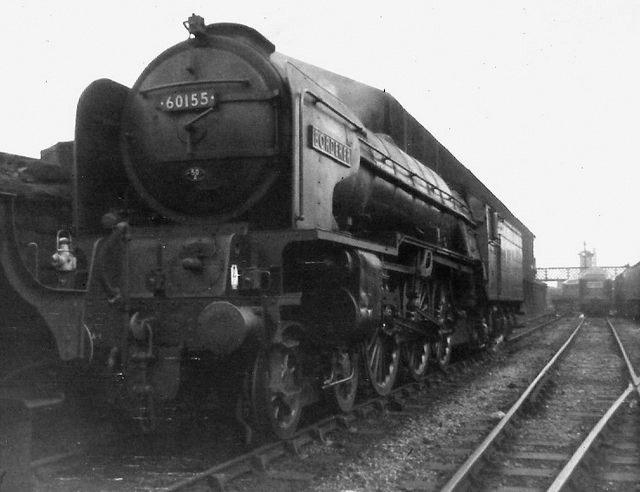
Original Peppercorn A1 60155 Borderer in 1964

In 1990, the charitable A1 Steam Locomotive Trust was founded with the intention of building a new LNER Peppercorn Class A1 steam locomotive as the 50th member of its class. The original 49 Peppercorn A1s were built in 1948 and 1949 at Doncaster and Darlington Works at £16,000 each. They were initially ordered for operation on the London and North Eastern Railway (LNER) to a design by its chief mechanical engineer Arthur Peppercorn, but were delivered after the company had been nationalised and became British Railways. The Peppercorn A1s ran services on the East Coast Main Line until the last one was scrapped in September 1966 after a comparatively short service of 15 years. None of them were preserved.

Tornado was intended to be built as the next Peppercorn A1 and not a restoration nor replica, and was assigned the next available number in the class after No. 60162 Saint Johnstoun. It was designed as an evolved member of its class, incorporating various improvements that would have occurred had steam continued in Britain. It was the first new build steam locomotive on British railways since BR Standard Class 9F 92220 Evening Star was completed in 1960.

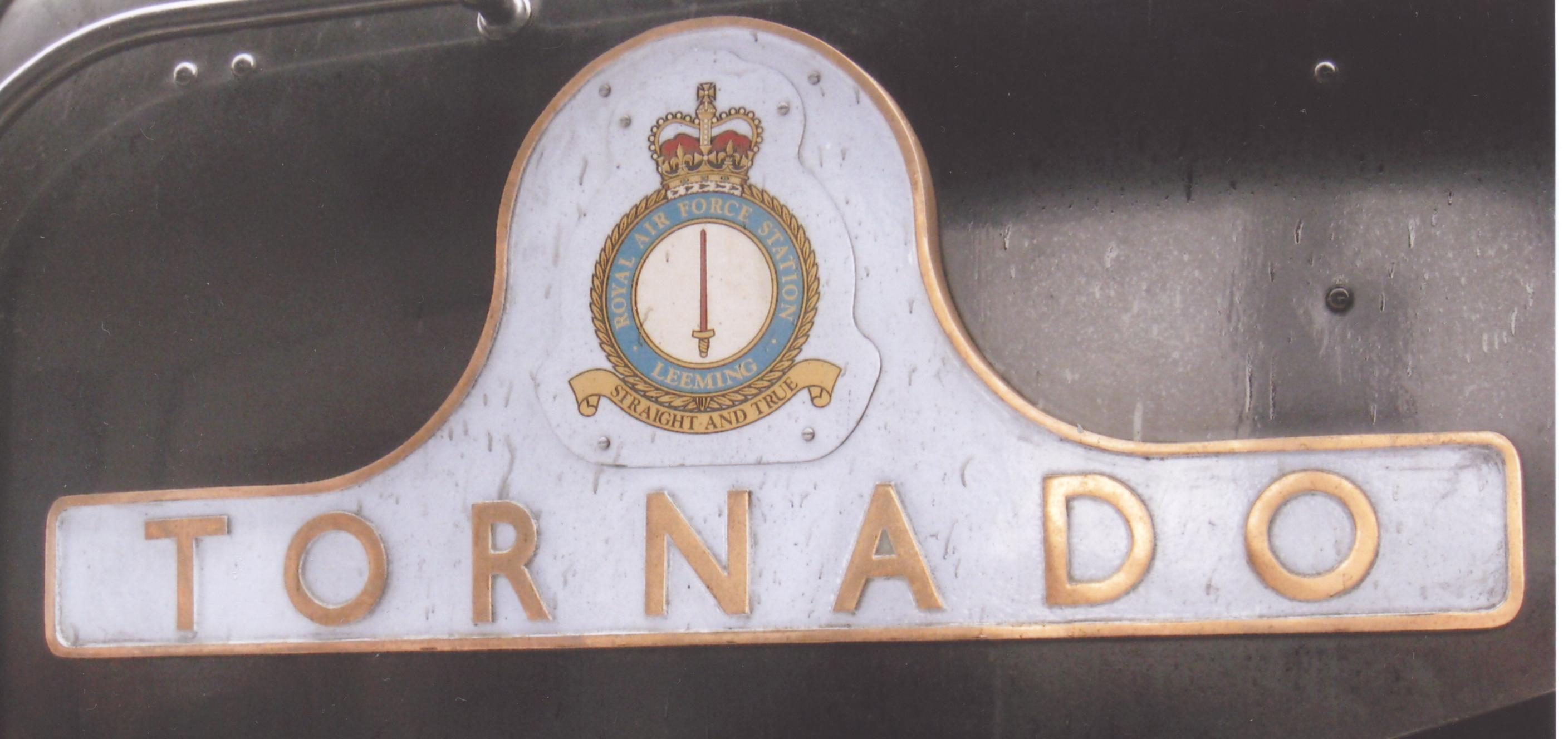
Tornado left-hand nameplate at York station in May 2009 showing the badge of RAF Leeming in Yorkshire, where RAF Tornado F3s were based until the previous month

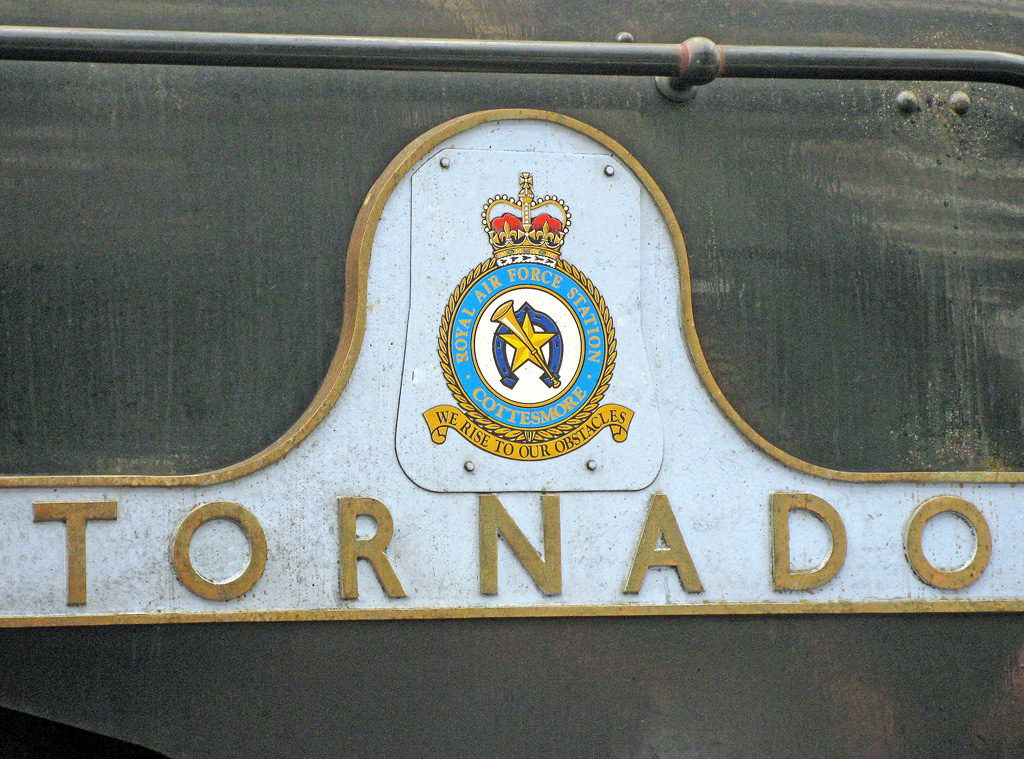
Tornado right-hand nameplate showing the badge of RAF Cottesmore, Rutland

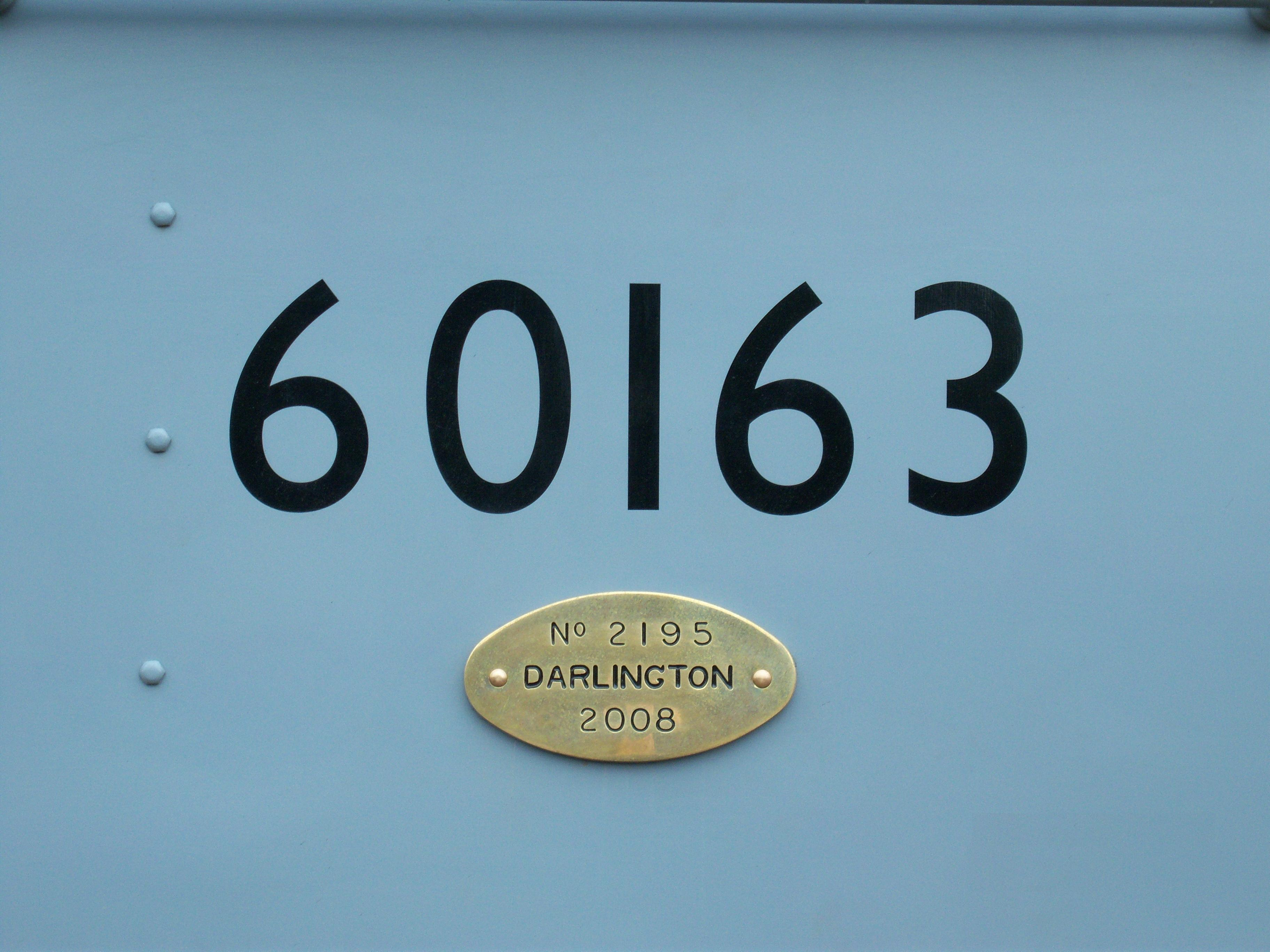
Running number and plaque, "No. 2195 Darlington 2008"

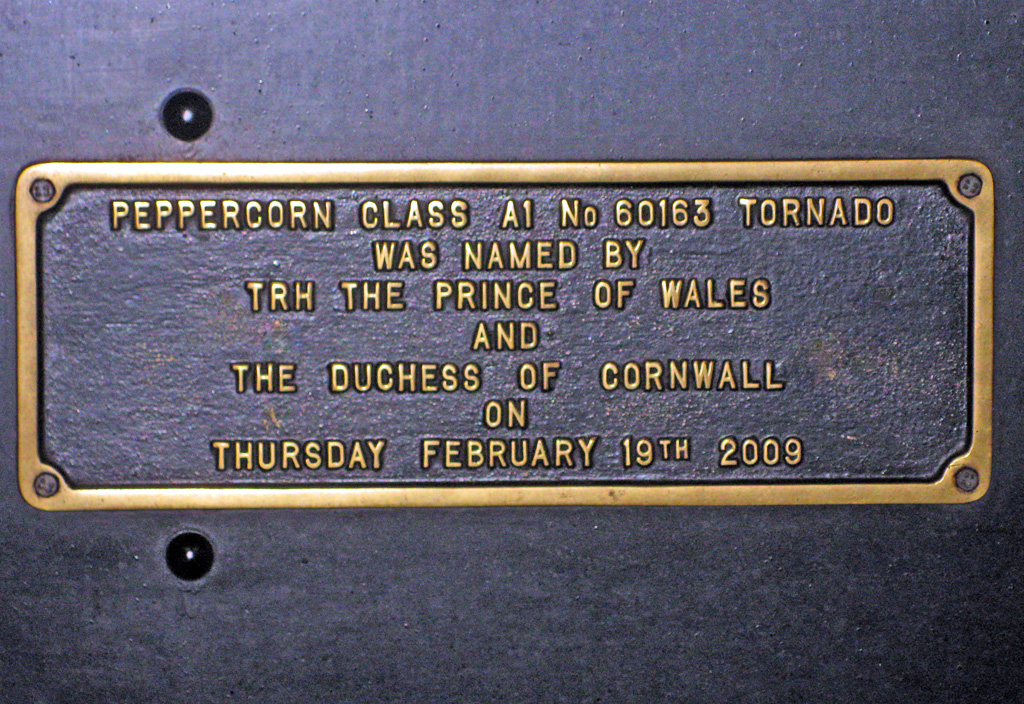
Plate recording the naming ceremony for 60163 Tornado

The name Tornado was chosen in honour of the Royal Air Force Panavia Tornado air crews flying at the time in the Gulf War. The honour of choosing the name was given to a £50,000 sponsor of the project. In January 1995, officers of the Royal Air Force presented the Tornado nameplates to the trust at Tyseley Locomotive Works at a frame laying ceremony. The smokebox door carries the identification plate of 51 A, the code for Darlington shed, and the cab side carries a builder's plate No. 2195 Darlington 2008. The front buffer beam carries the designation A1.

On 19 February 2009, Tornado was officially named by the Prince of Wales, accompanied by the Duchess of Cornwall and Dorothy Mather, Peppercorn's widow, at York railway station. The ceremony is marked by a plaque located below the nameplate. Tornado then pulled the Royal Train to Leeds.

== Project milestones ==
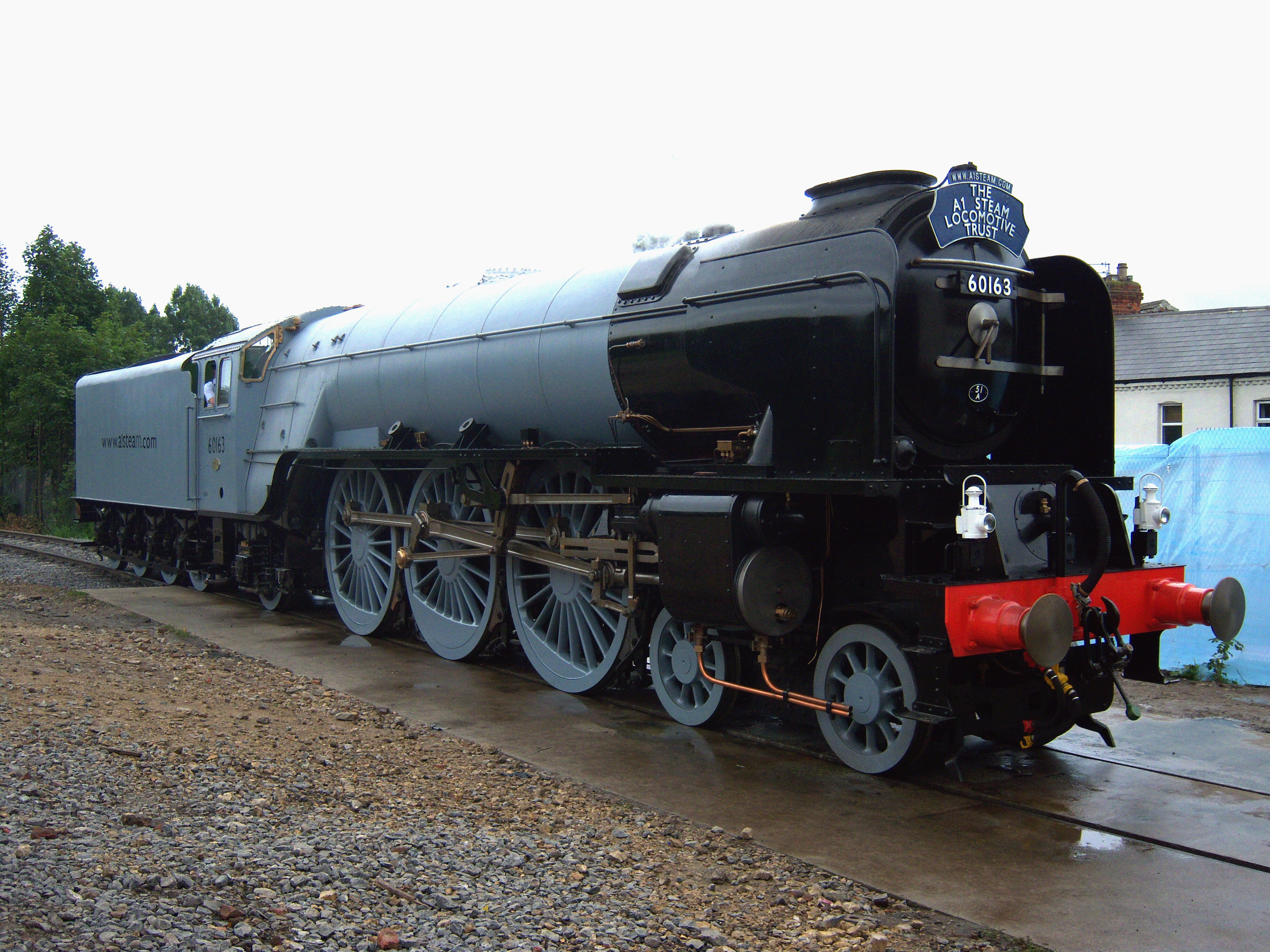
Tornado, 8 August 2008

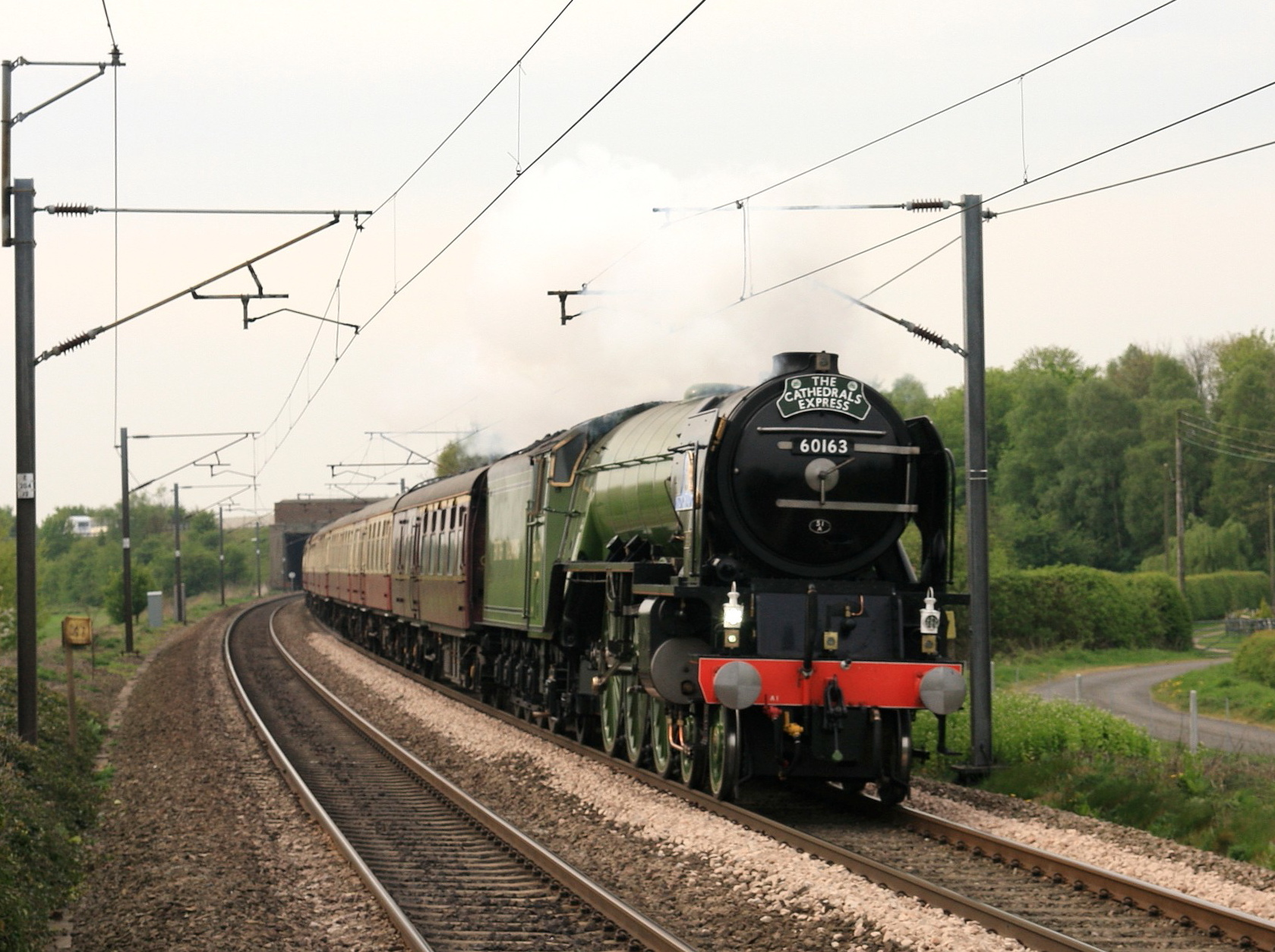
Tornado passing Sutton-on-Trent during the Top Gear Race to the North wearing The Cathedrals Express headboard, 25 April 2009

- 1990: A1 Steam Locomotive Trust formally launched, 11 November
- 1994: First and last components ceremonially presented (a bogie swivel pin and a regulator nut)
- 1994: Construction starts (frame plates rolled at Scunthorpe), 22 April
- 1995: Nameplates presented at the frame laying ceremony, January
- 1995: First wheel cast
- 1996: Three cylinder castings unveiled at Tyseley, 25 May
- 1997: Frame displayed at the Great Hall at the National Railway Museum, March
- 1997: Tornado unveiled at Darlington Locomotive Works
- 1999: Smokebox door complete, Tornado's symbolic "face"
- 2000: Construction over 50% complete (Summer)
- 2000: Wheelset added (Autumn)
- 2004: The book value of Tornado components reaches 1 million pounds
- 2004: First synchronous smooth wheel motion, 25 August
- 2007: Boiler/firebox assembly fitted to frame, June
- 2008: First static steaming, January
- 2008: Tender completed, February
- 2008: Tornado publicly launched, Darlington Locomotive Works, 1 August 2008
- 2008: First passenger train hauled, preserved Great Central Railway. Loughborough, 21 September 2008
- 2008: Main line testing begins, National Railway Museum, York, 4 November
- 2008: Third and final main line test run completed, York, 19 November
- 2008: First full livery unveiled (minus nameplates), LNER Apple Green, York, 13 December 2008
- 2009: The Peppercorn Pioneer, the first passenger journey on the UK Main Line, 31 January 2009
- 2009: Tornado was officially named by the Prince of Wales and the Duchess of Cornwall, 19 February 2009
- 2009: BBC Top Gear Race filmed, 25 April 2009
- 2009: Institution of Mechanical Engineers present Tornado with Engineering Heritage Award at York, 23 May 2009
- 2009: Reaches 10,000 miles (16,000 km) on Torbay Express, 5 July
- 2009: Tornado is called on to rescue stranded commuters in Kent after heavy snow fall disrupts the electrical supply
- 2010: Beats previous record for fastest steam hauled railtour over Shap summit by 19 seconds, 24 June
- 2010: Returns to York NRM for maintenance and to be repainted to lined "Brunswick Green" December
- 2011: Boiler returned to DB Meiningen for repairs January
- 2017: Worked first scheduled passenger trains on the Settle and Carlisle line between Appleby and Skipton
- 2017: Became the first steam engine since 1967 to run at 100mph in the UK

== Design ==
=== Initial research and draughting ===
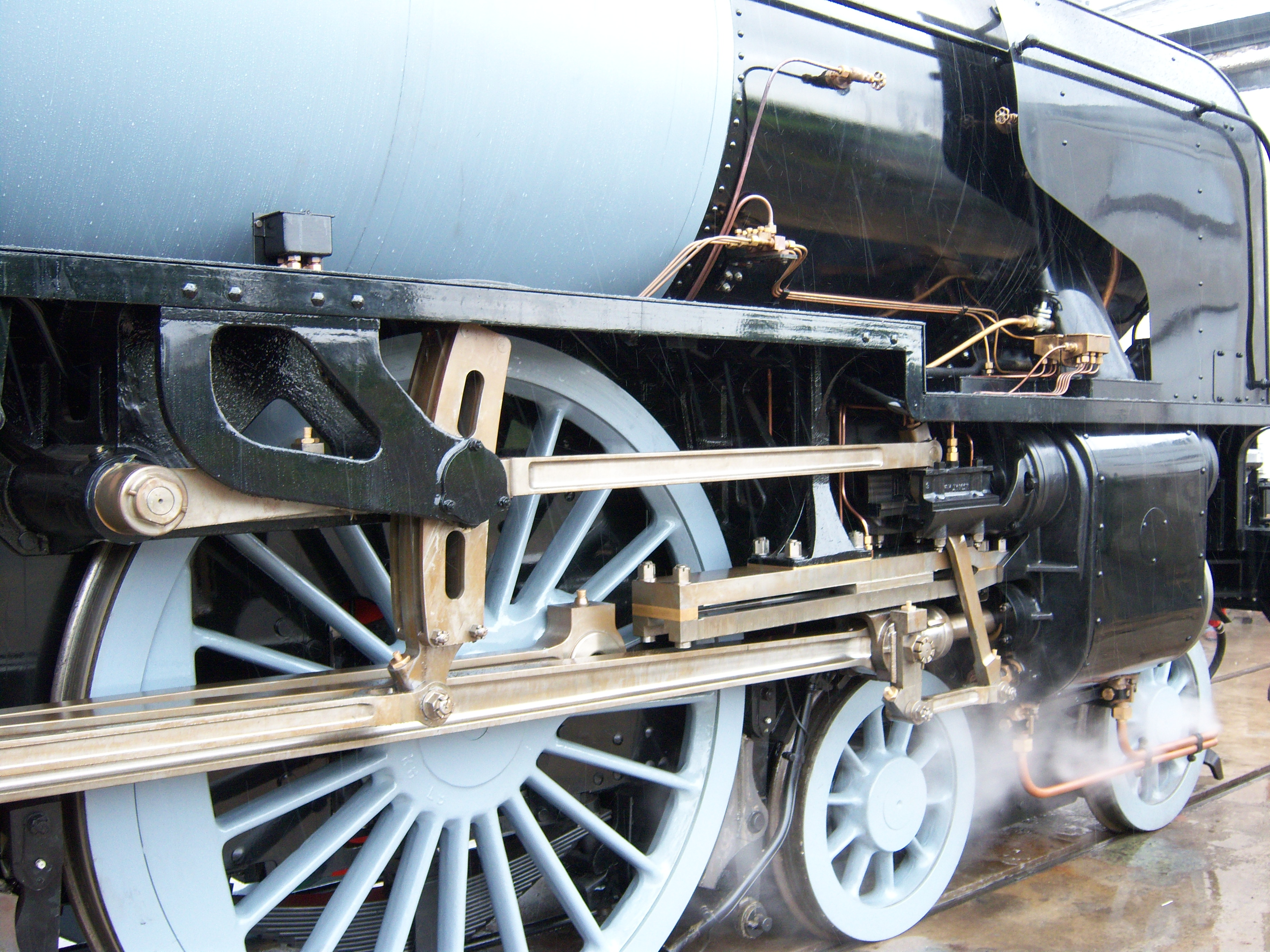
Right-hand valve gear

On hearing of the project in October 1991, Argentine locomotive engineer Livio Dante Porta contacted the trust, hailing the project as the start of a "renaissance of steam technology". In 1992, he submitted A proposal for the Tornado project in which he presented to the trust several design improvements that could be made to Tornado that, while preserving the outer form, would make it a second-generation steam locomotive. Since the trust was not creating a replica of a Peppercorn A1 but the next in its class, Porta's suggestions were duly considered and the trust reported only some of his ideas could be adopted as his others were untried and presented too many risks, which Porta estimated would have taken 20,000 test miles to iron out his improvements. Ironically, in 2003, it was decided to make Tornado oil-fired for cost and operational reasons, following earlier dual-fuelled coal-and-oil-fired proposals in 1998, when boiler design commenced. This was later abandoned in favour of the original design of coal firing, due to the large increase in global fossil fuel prices, and to save the certification costs of this design difference.

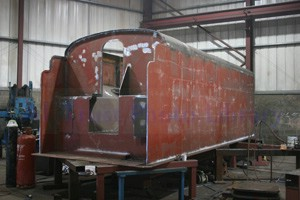
Tender body, 2007

There were no general arrangement drawings of a Peppercorn A1, so rough engineering dimensions for Tornado were obtained from measuring Peppercorn Class A2 60532 Blue Peter at the National Railway Museum (NRM). Many of the drawings originally used at Doncaster Works for the Peppercorn A1's had been preserved at the NRM, and a team of volunteers spent three days collating these in 1991. The original drawings were India ink drawings on linen which had to be scanned into a computer aided design (CAD) software program as the microfilm copies at the NRM were not suitable for manufacturing purposes, and direct dyeline copies could not be made. 95% of the original drawings were found, with 1,100 scanned by 1993, and a further 140 in 2001. A few poor quality originals required re-drawing. Updated specifications were required to be drawn up to account for out-of-date material specifications and drawing notes whose original meaning could not be determined. Other design details were also obtained through interviews with Peppercorn's former assistant, J.F. Harrison.

=== Changes from the original Peppercorn A1s ===
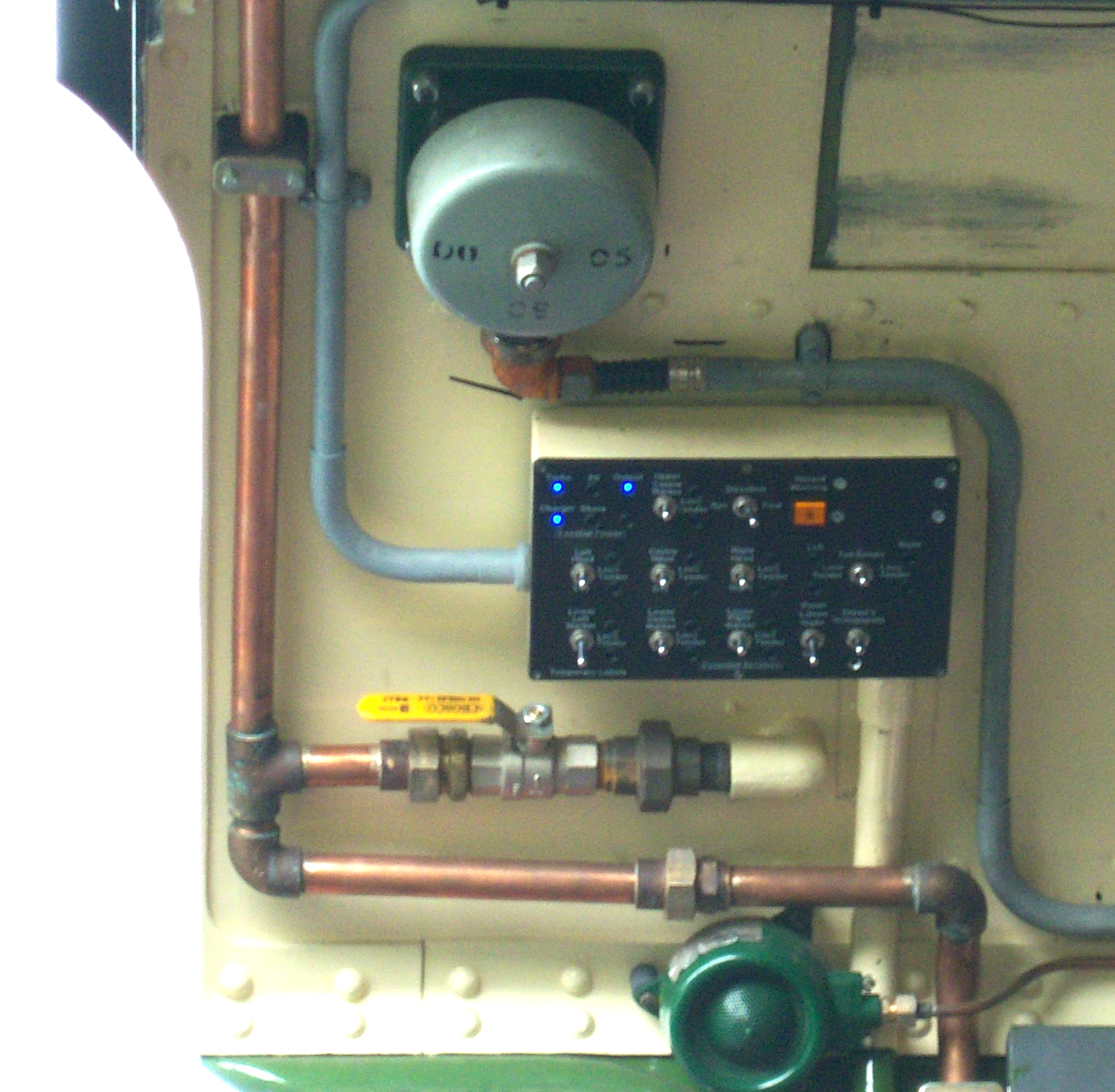
Cab electrics

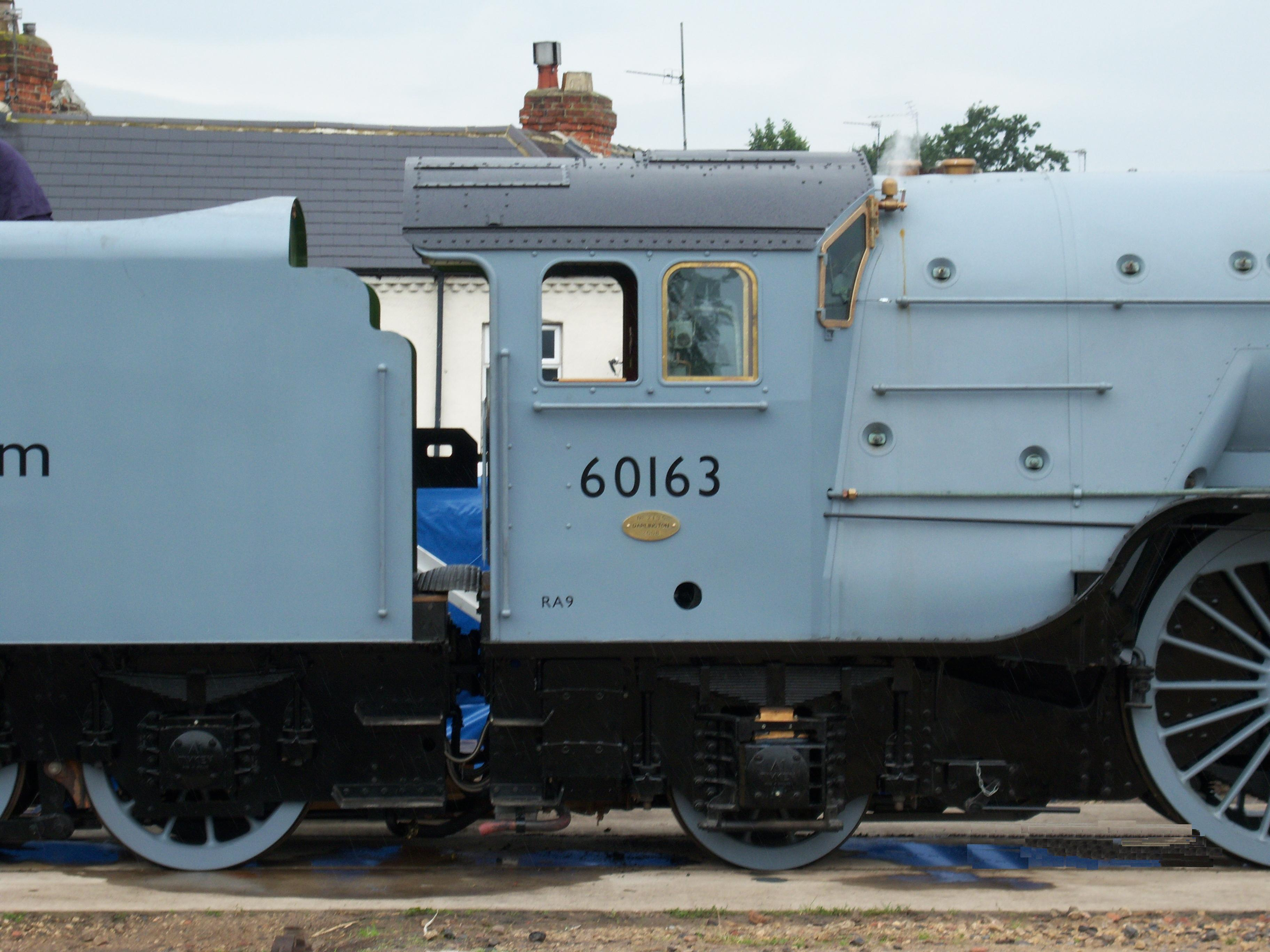
Cartazzi axle

Tornado's design was modified where necessary to better suit modern manufacturing techniques and to fit in with the modern high-speed railway, while retaining the greater part of the original design. As an evolution of the Peppercorn Class A1, Tornado also incorporated improvements that would have been made to the class had steam continued, such as correction of the rough riding faults.

The following design changes were made for cost or operational reasons:

- An all-welded boiler (i.e. not riveted)
- Steel firebox (not copper)
- One-piece frames
- Roller bearings
- Improved front bogie
- Improved steam circuit
- Altered tender coal/water balance (more water)
- Overall weight reduction

Additionally, to meet current safety and operation standards, Tornado includes:

- Up-rated electrical supplies
- Primary air (not steam) brakes
- LED cluster head/tail lamps
- Vacuum brakes (for heritage railway stock)
- 1 inch (25 mm) reduction in overall height (for overhead line equipment (OLE) regulations)
- Automatic Warning System (AWS)
- Train Protection & Warning System (TPWS)
- Data recorder
- European Rail Traffic Management System (ERTMS) compatible GSM-Railway (GSM-R) cab radio

With advances in manufacturing, Tornado's 48-foot-6-inch (14.78 m) long steel plates were electronically cut from one piece of steel, as opposed to the original Peppercorn A1s, which had two-piece frames riveted together. These are probably the most accurate steam locomotive frames ever produced. Despite their higher costs, roller bearings were used owing to the reliability they had demonstrated after a trial on some of the original engines. This caused an unforeseen problem in 2003 since the modifications made to the tender in the original fitting of roller bearings as an experiment to some Peppercorn A1s had not been properly drawn for the Cartazzi axle of the trailing wheels.

A 1-inch (25 mm) reduction in height from the original 13-foot-1-inch (3.99 m) height was required by the Network Rail regulations, and was achieved by a redesign of the dome and safety valve mountings on the boiler, and by reprofiling of the cab roof and chimney. Testing was planned to occur with a lipped chimney, and on receipt of the first full livery, Tornado was fitted with an authentic rimless chimney, described as the original non-capped version. The fluted chimney was still not fitted at the time of its LNER Apple Green livery launch on 13 December 2008, due to it still being machined at the manufacturer. It was completed and fitted in time for the inaugural main line passenger run. The chimney was also fitted with a spark arrestor. Tornado has two whistles: a standard LNER "teapot" whistle on the cab front and an ex-LNER chime whistle from LNER Class A4 4482 Golden Eagle behind the right-hand deflector.

=== Boiler from Meiningen Works ===
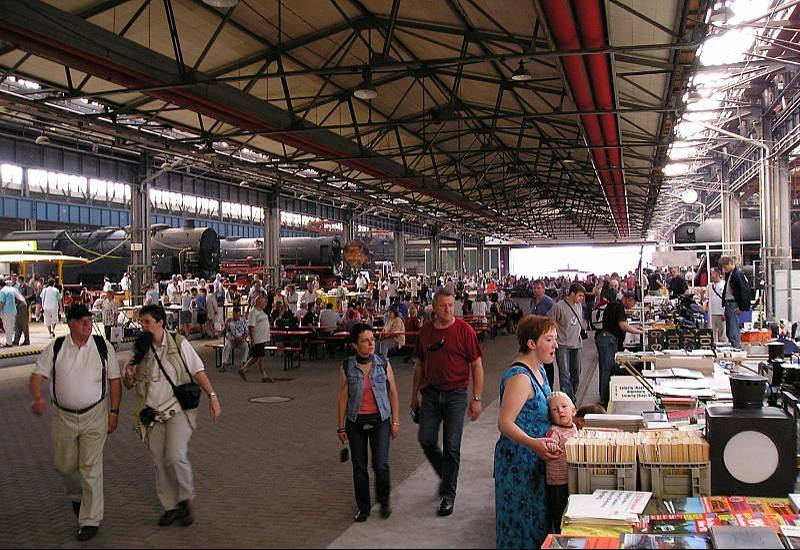
Meiningen Steam Locomotive Works, 2005

Consideration of the boiler began in late 1998. No standard gauge boiler had been built in Britain for such a large express locomotive since the 1960s, and it was required to be based on the original LNER design but meet modern safety standards. Design changes included the cheaper modern-day fabrication method of a welded, rather than riveted, firebox and boiler tubing; the use of steel, rather than copper, for the firebox; and the aforementioned height reduction for Network Rail regulations. While manufacturing facilities still existed in Britain to manufacture such a large boiler, because of the design differences from the originals the trust required a supplier with specific experience of designing, building, and certification of modern steam engine boilers as required by the EU's Pressure Equipment Directive.

In early 2002, the Deutsche Bahn's Meiningen Steam Locomotive Works in Germany was identified as a suitable supplier. It possessed the required knowledge as main line steam operation had continued in East Germany until the mid-1980s, 70% of its work still involved steam, and it still possessed the powerful plate roller machines. The trust did not have sufficient funding to place the order until January 2005. On 16 July 2006, the boiler arrived by sea and was unloaded at Darlington with a 200-ton crane, having taken just nine months to build. The fitting of the 21-ton firebox and boiler unit to the wheeled locomotive frame was said to have been a perfect fit, requiring no grinding at all, a tribute to the accuracy of the design and construction at Meiningen. The fitting was not without incident though, as the extra weight caused some compaction of the trackbed, and assistance was required to move the locomotive back into the works, by a combination of being winched, towed by a forklift truck and pushed with Land Rovers.

A further modification to the boiler design has been the use of hollow stays which support and separate the outer boiler and inner firebox. The hollow stays act as an indicator of any cracks in the otherwise inaccessible stays, such cracks being revealed by water leaks. Leaks have in fact been detected and have led to the locomotive being unavailable for service. Replacement stays were fitted in 2010.

=== Tender and wheelset ===
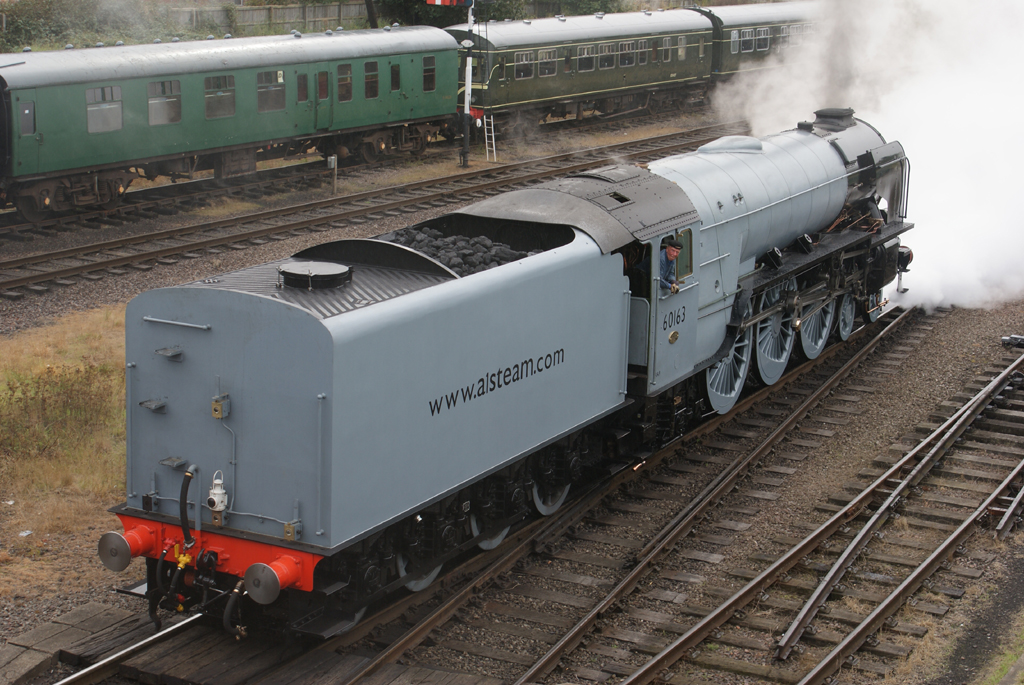
Tornado shunts at the GCR, showing the tender design, 4 October 2008

In 1991, a preference for a "Doncaster pattern" riveted tender was expressed as per the original Peppercorn A1s. The redundant tender of LNER Class A3 4472 Flying Scotsman was acquired, although later returned unused, allowing Tornado to remain a completely originally manufactured locomotive. By 2002, it was agreed that a flush sided (all welded) boiler and tender was appropriate for a Darlington-built Peppercorn A1, making construction and maintenance easier. The tender was redesigned internally, removing the water scoop, increasing the water capacity from 5,000 to 6,000 gallons, and reducing coal capacity from 9 to 7.5 tons. In 2003 the need for a second tender for Tornado was discounted.

The motion components alone cost £150,000, taking £50,000 to forge (and requiring three years to complete) and £100,000 to machine. The wheelset was the first mainline steam locomotive wheelset to be manufactured in Britain since 1960, and took five years and nine suppliers. The wheels were so smooth that the complete locomotive could easily be pushed out of the works by human power alone, as seen when the locomotive was moved outside in preparation for its first steam-powered moves. If the locomotive were to be suspended, the entire wheel and motion arrangement could be turned by hand.

== Manufacturing ==
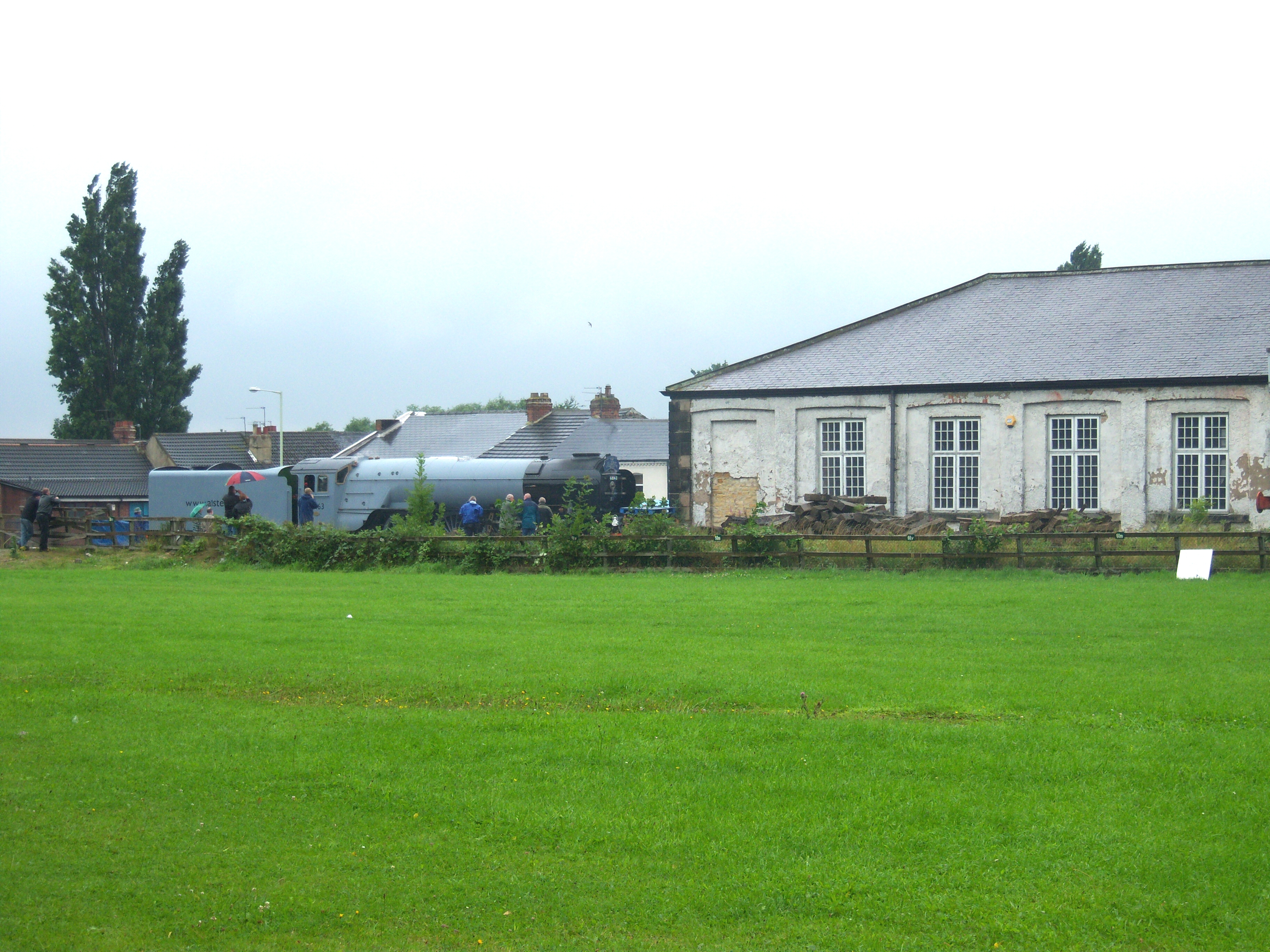
Tornado in the Darlington Locomotive Works siding

Tornado was mostly assembled at the A1 Trust's Darlington Locomotive Works, bringing together components manufactured around the country and some from overseas. Actual manufacture and construction started in 1994 before the works opened, with casting of the cylinders and wheels, the cutting of the frames, and construction of the cab. The locomotive frames were assembled at Tyseley Locomotive Works in Birmingham, which was marked by a laying ceremony on 5 January 1995 and completed by October 1996.

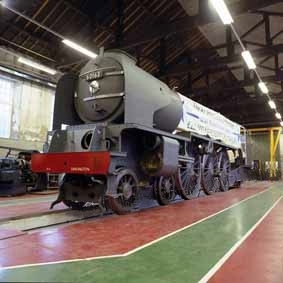
Tornado in 2002, awaiting a boiler

In March 1997 Tornado, as a completed frame and inside cylinder, was displayed in the Great Hall at the National Railway Museum for several weeks. It returned to Tyseley to await completion of Darlington Works. The elements of Tornado were brought together with the opening of the works in 1997, and the opening ceremony saw the unveiled locomotive, now consisting of the frame with its three cylinders and cab attached. Early 1998 saw the smokebox construction started and the tyres fitted and by 1999, forging of the motion components had started with the first delivery of components commencing in January 2000.

By September 1999, the last wheel had been pressed onto the wheelset, which was delivered to Darlington by July 2000. By January 2000, the front bogie had been assembled. With the fitting of these parts, the mounting of the frame onto the wheelset, and fitting of the smokebox, by the end of 2000, the most visible missing parts of Tornado were the boiler and tender.

Post-2000, assembly and setting of the motion proceeded, and attention turned to the design of the boiler; a £250,000 appeal was launched. Tornado became a rolling chassis by October 2002, and achieved the first synchronous movement of the motion and all wheels in August 2004. 2005 saw construction of the boiler in Germany, with construction begun on 16 October, and completed in time for delivery on 16 July 2006. By June 2007 Tornado's internal construction was sufficiently complete to allow fitting of the boiler to the frame, using a 100-ton crane. The most complex casting, the superheater header, was started in 2007, and after defeating two foundries the complex shape was cast by a third supplier. Owing to space constraints at Darlington works, the Tornado tender frames and body were built off-site, with the body being significantly built locally in Darlington. The tender wheelsets were assembled by an East Lancs Railway-based company. The tender frame and wheelset were united by December 2007, and the tank attached to it by February 2008.

From its construction until final testing was completed, Tornado sported a grey coloured undercoat as a precaution in case the boiler cladding had to be removed. The livery was described as "works grey" in a "satin finish". While in this undercoat, Tornado wore the web address of the A1 Trust on the side of the tender and the mark RA9 on the locomotive cab, denoting its route availability.

== Commissioning ==
=== Boiler tests ===
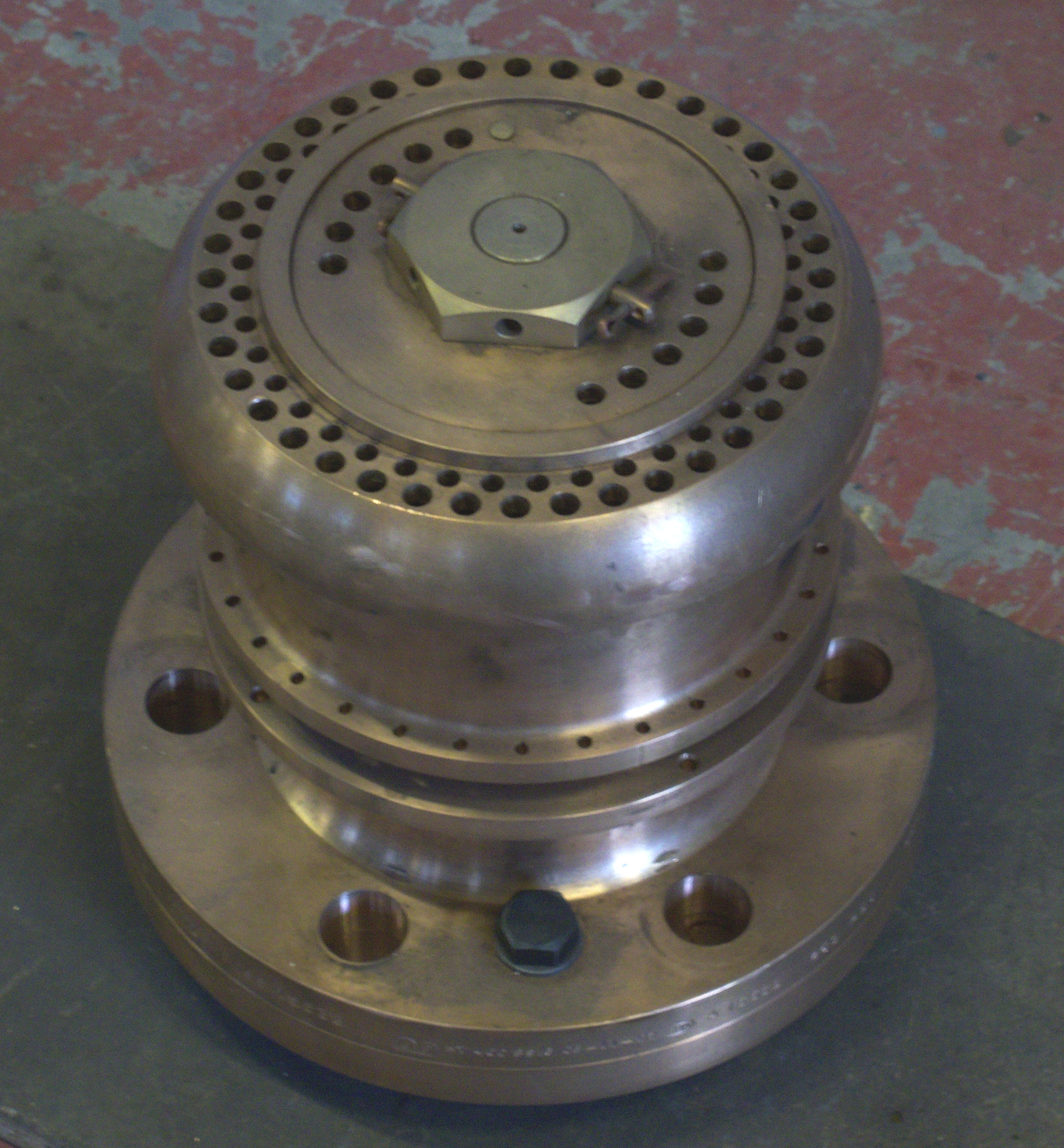
One of Tornado's boiler safety valves

A computer simulation was used to assist in the setting up of the valves and motion. The boiler safety valves were tested on LNER Class A4 60009 Union of South Africa at the Severn Valley Railway before their delivery to Meiningen for fitting to Tornado. The boiler was hydraulically tested at the manufacturer's factory at one-and-a-half times working pressure and was passed safe. On 11 January 2008, the boiler passed its first steam test in a series of tests carried out by an external boiler inspector. For the test, the fire was lit and the boiler was allowed to warm up for over 48 hours before being then taken up to 260 psi (1,800 kPa), just over the maximum working pressure, with the safety valves set to the correct pressure. The boiler was noted by the inspector to be a very rapid one, boding well for use on the mainline, and noted Tornado exhibited no leaks of any kind, in contrast to heritage locomotive restorations.

The tender body was not yet finished by this time so the test was conducted using a water bowser. The boiler created steam so efficiently that the water supply was being used faster than it could be replenished by the mains water supply to the works. To complete the test and not prematurely damp down the fire, an emergency call for water was made to the local fire brigade, who responded with a fire tender to supply more water. This was sensationally but inaccurately reported in one local newspaper as "fire brigade called to prevent boiler explosion".

=== Launch and Great Central Railway trials ===
Tornado steaming and whistling along the Darlington test siding, 8 August 2008

Low speed trials of Tornado as a live steam locomotive first occurred on the 500-foot (150 m) long track at Darlington Works. After a series of private tests, Tornado made its first in-steam moves on 29 July 2008, followed by its official launch on 1 August, moving up and down the test siding in front of the press. The 1 August launch coincided with the 40th anniversary of the end of steam on British Railways on 4 August 1968, and the 60th anniversary of the entry into traffic of the first Peppercorn A1 class locomotive, No. 60114 W.P. Allen. On 7 August, Tornado was entered onto Total Operations Processing System (TOPS), a computer system used in the UK for managing locomotives and rolling stock. Although the painted number is 60163, Tornado is designated 98863 on the British main line in TOPS, where "98" describes a steam engine, the "8" stems from the power classification of 8P, and "63" comes from its 60163 number.

From Darlington Works, Tornado was moved by road on two articulated lorries to the Great Central Railway on 19 August, where it performed mileage accumulation and testing before hauling its first passenger trains. Testing of the On-Train Monitoring Recorder (OTMR), Train Protection & Warning System (TPWS), Automatic Warning System (AWS), and air brakes was also done at the GCR, and are standard for all steam locomotives requiring certification for main line running, with speed and regulator positions tracked by the onboard recording equipment stored under the driver's seat. After three days, Tornado had completed its first non-stop mile run and had hauled empty coaches. Following HM Railway Inspectorate (HMRI) recommendations, it went on to haul empty trains at speeds up to 60 mph (97 km/h) and with a load of up to around 500 tons. One load test involved a rake of 11 coaches and a Class 45 diesel locomotive, and another saw it achieve 2,000 drawbar horsepower. On 10 September Tornado was officially timed for the first time, hauling 518 tons up the 1-in-176 gradient south from Rothley station. For the GCR's Day Out with Thomas event during the Summer Bank Holiday weekend, Tornado wore a small Thomas face for light runs.

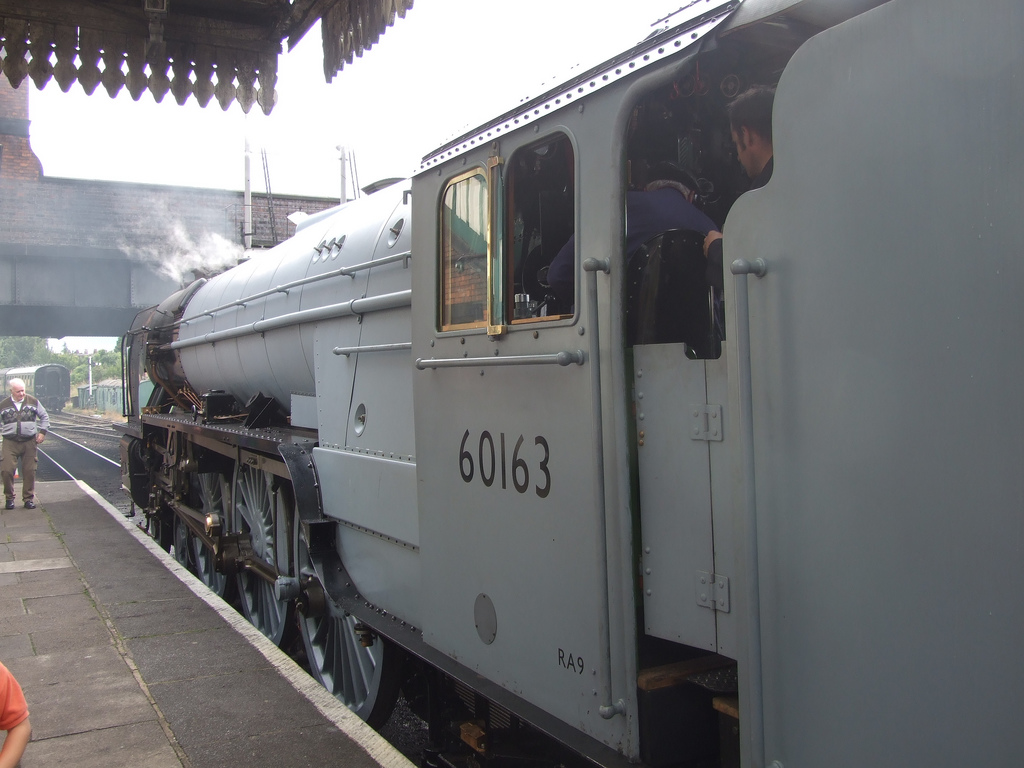
Tornado at the GCR, 22 August 2008

Tornado's first passenger trains took place on 21 September 2008; the first was the 10.15 a.m. non-stop service from Quorn and Woodhouse to Leicester North. On this day, 1,000–2,000 covenantors, donors and guests travelled on the services. The first service for fare-paying passengers began on 22 September, where over 1,000 people were carried on the three sold-out trips. On 4 October, Tornado took part in the 125th anniversary of the Boys' Brigade, wearing a special headboard and hauled the GCR's preserved Travelling Post Office train. Its final passenger run on the GCR was on 12 October, and had run 1,500 miles (2,400 km) by the end of the month. The president of the GCR said Tornado achieved a "smooth debut", and the engine was described as having performed "effortlessly" and "faultlessly".

=== Mainline test runs ===
On 21 October 2008, Tornado arrived at the National Railway Museum in York, and was first put on display in the Great Hall for several days, where it was placed on its central turntable for the annual railway industry dinner on 23 October. Tornado then remained operationally based at the NRM behind the scenes for final preparations and testing on the main line, reaching speeds of up to 75 mph (121 km/h), before an expected main line debut in February 2009.

The acceptance testing based at York was conducted by DB Schenker. Three test runs were planned for 4, 6 and 18 November 2008, involving out and back journeys from York in the evenings. The first was to Scarborough, a round trip of 84 miles (135 km), with a support coach only. The second was a 142-mile (229 km) round trip to Barrow Hill, with Tornado hauling a 500-ton load of 12 coaches and a Class 67 diesel at up to 60 mph (97 km/h). The third run was a 176-mile (283 km) trip to Newcastle with a rake of empty coaches that reached 75 mph (121 km/h) On this run, the web address on the side of the tender was replaced with the National Express logo. All runs were carried out successfully.

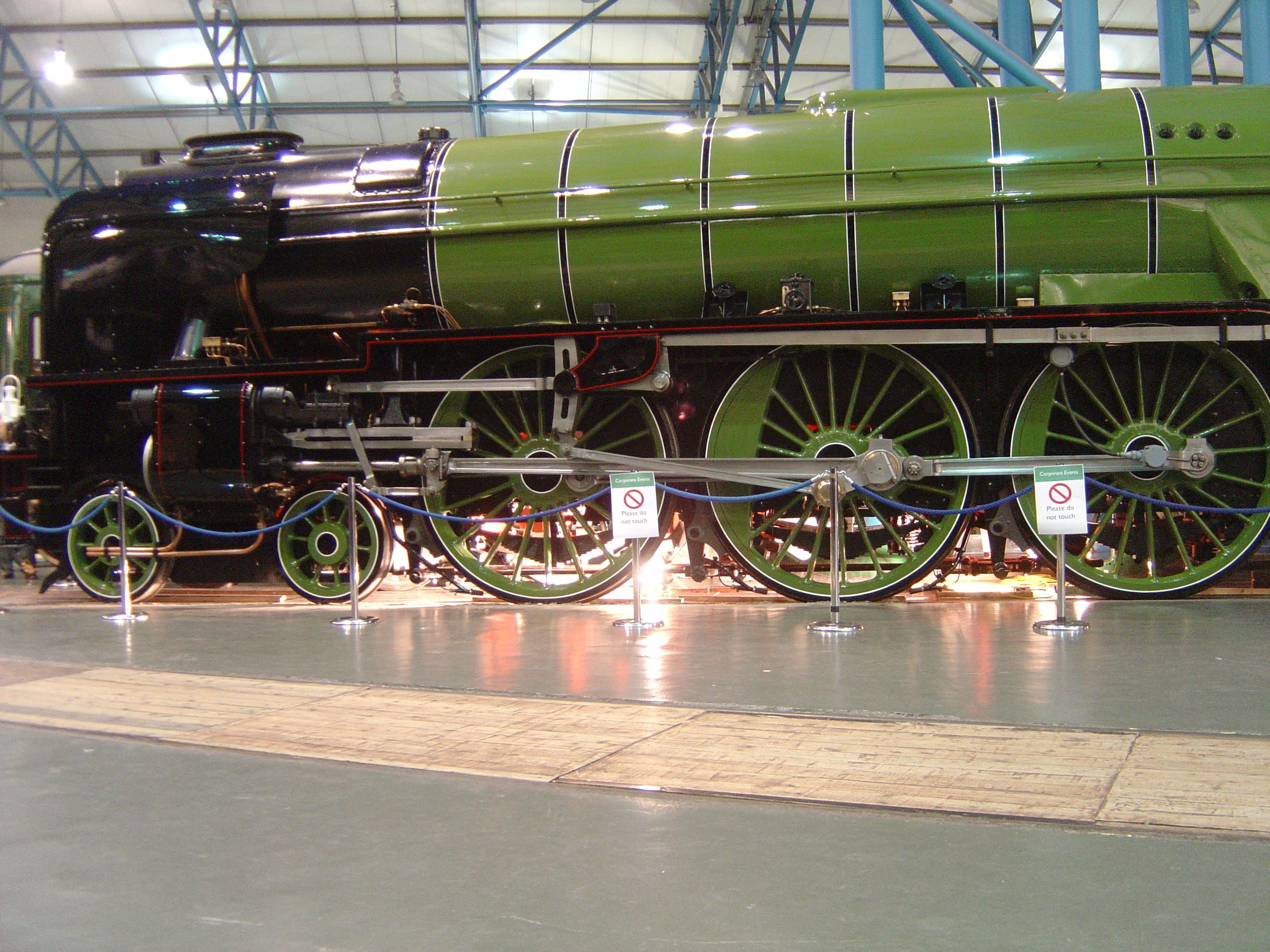
Tornado at the National Railway Museum in its first full livery (LNER Apple Green)

Following the test runs, Tornado received its first full livery at the NRM's paint shop where it was painted in LNER Apple Green with "British Railways" on the tender, as worn by the first original 30 Peppercorn A1s. The livery was applied traditionally, brush painted by hand. It was unveiled on the turntable at the NRM's Great Hall on 13 December 2008 at a launch ceremony attended by 500 supporters of the A1 Trust. A dynamometer car from the North Eastern Railway was attached. Due to time constraints, detailing was completed on one side only at the time of the launch, after which Tornado returned to the paint shop before going back on display for the Christmas period. On 11 January 2009, Tornado left the NRM for preparations for its mainline passenger debut. A final test run was completed with a single support coach from York to Leeds and back, on 28 January.

=== Certification ===
As a new build locomotive, Tornado's certification was more complex in comparison to a restored one and required liaison with Network Rail, HMRI, and a vehicle acceptance body, with the origin of all construction materials needing to be documented and every aspect of the manufacture recorded. Following manufacture, a technical file and Notified Body certificate was obtained on completion of a manufacturing and maintenance procedures review which was managed by DeltaRail Group Ltd. Tornado was also required to pass the 2006 European Interoperability of the conventional rail system directive, achieved through compliance with the National Notified Technical Rules (formerly the Railway Group Standards), though it was exempt from portions of the regulations, as are many mainline steam locomotives, such as from the need for a yellow warning panel or crumple zones. In liaison with Network Rail, a route acceptance strategy was agreed upon and approval for Tornado to enter service was granted by the Office of Rail Regulation (ORR). This was completed in two stages, approval under the Railway and Other Transport Systems regulations, for use on the GCR and other preserved lines, and then as an "interoperable" locomotive for use on the mainline network.

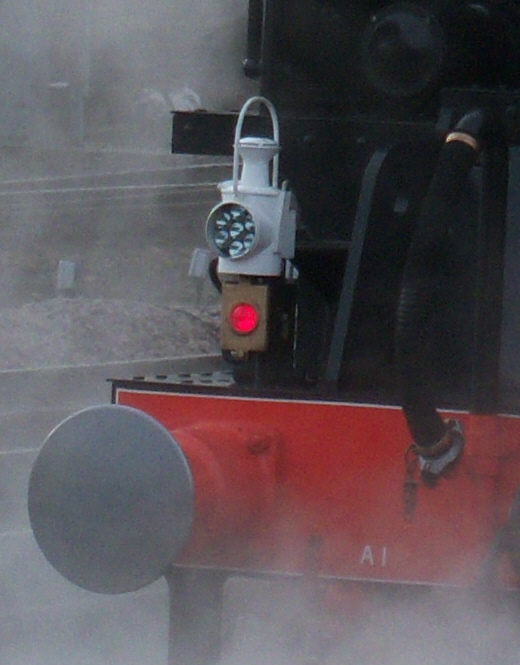
Tornado LED cluster lamps in reversing aspect. Note the "A1" buffer beam mark.

As well as standard tests, as technically a new design of locomotive, Tornado was required to undergo specific extra tests set by the Network Rail Safety Review Panel to examine ride quality and track force, in order to assess the effect the locomotive would have on the main line track. Such tests were done in part at the GCR, whereby Tornado ran through a curved section of track at Kinchley at speeds of 10, 20, 30, 40, 50 and 60 mph (97 km/h), with a trailing saloon car fitted with monitoring equipment, including a GPS unit to measure the precise speed and distance travelled at every metre. Measurements were taken on board by 21 sensors measuring pitch and roll, and acceleration and deceleration. Measurements were also taken through the use of track-side sensors measuring side forces exerted on the rails, augmented with freeze-frame footage of the position of the wheels as they passed. The results were compared with control readings taken at the same site using BR Standard Class 7 70013 Oliver Cromwell two weeks later. The preliminary results were described as producing "no untoward signals".

Tornado was granted an Engineering Acceptance (EA) certificate on 31 October by DeltaRail and a Route Acceptance certificate on 3 November by Network Rail, allowing testing on the main line to begin. Further tests were performed at Network Rail facilities located between York and Darlington, at a testing facility known as a WheelChex. This consists of track fitted with sensors to measure vertical force effects such as hammer blow. Completion of a test run between York and Leeds on 28 January 2009 signalled the gaining of certification to haul passengers on the Network Rail main line.

In January 2009, the railway press reported that a discrepancy had emerged in the 18 November 2008 75 mph (121 km/h) test, whereby the OTMR recording equipment on the Class 67 being towed had recorded a top speed of around 100 mph (160 km/h), while the A1 data recorder measured speeds "nearer the 75 mph (121 km/h)" mark. It was stated that while a 10% overspeed is allowed (and may be required) in such new equipment test runs (A4 Class 4464 Bittern reached 83 mph (134 km/h) in 2007), Tornado had not been planned or authorised to do so on this test. It was suggested that the discrepancy might have been down to the equipment on the Class 67 having had its gearing altered but not having been recalibrated.

== Operation ==
=== First mainline runs ===
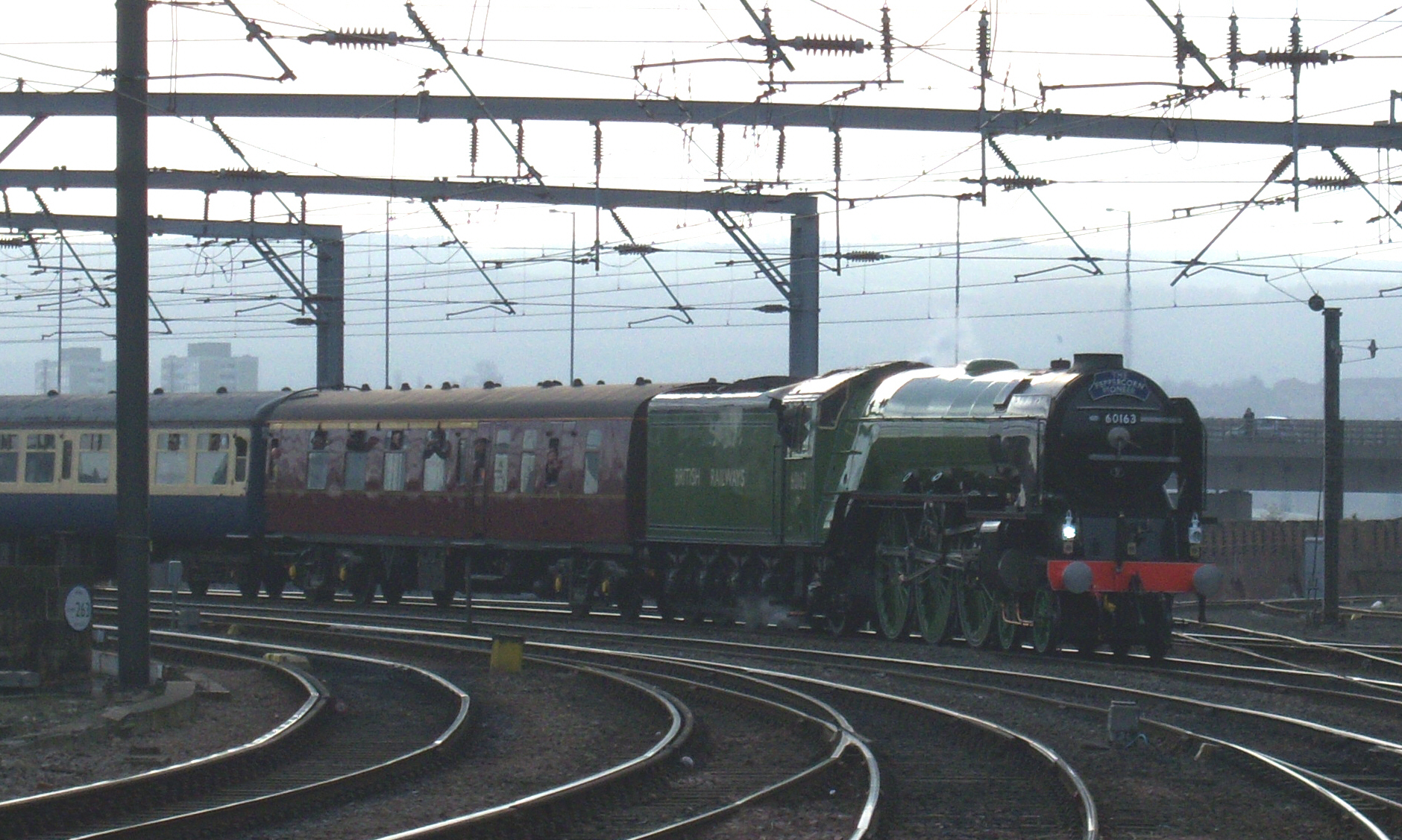
Tornado arrives in Newcastle on its first main line passenger trip, The Peppercorn Pioneer.

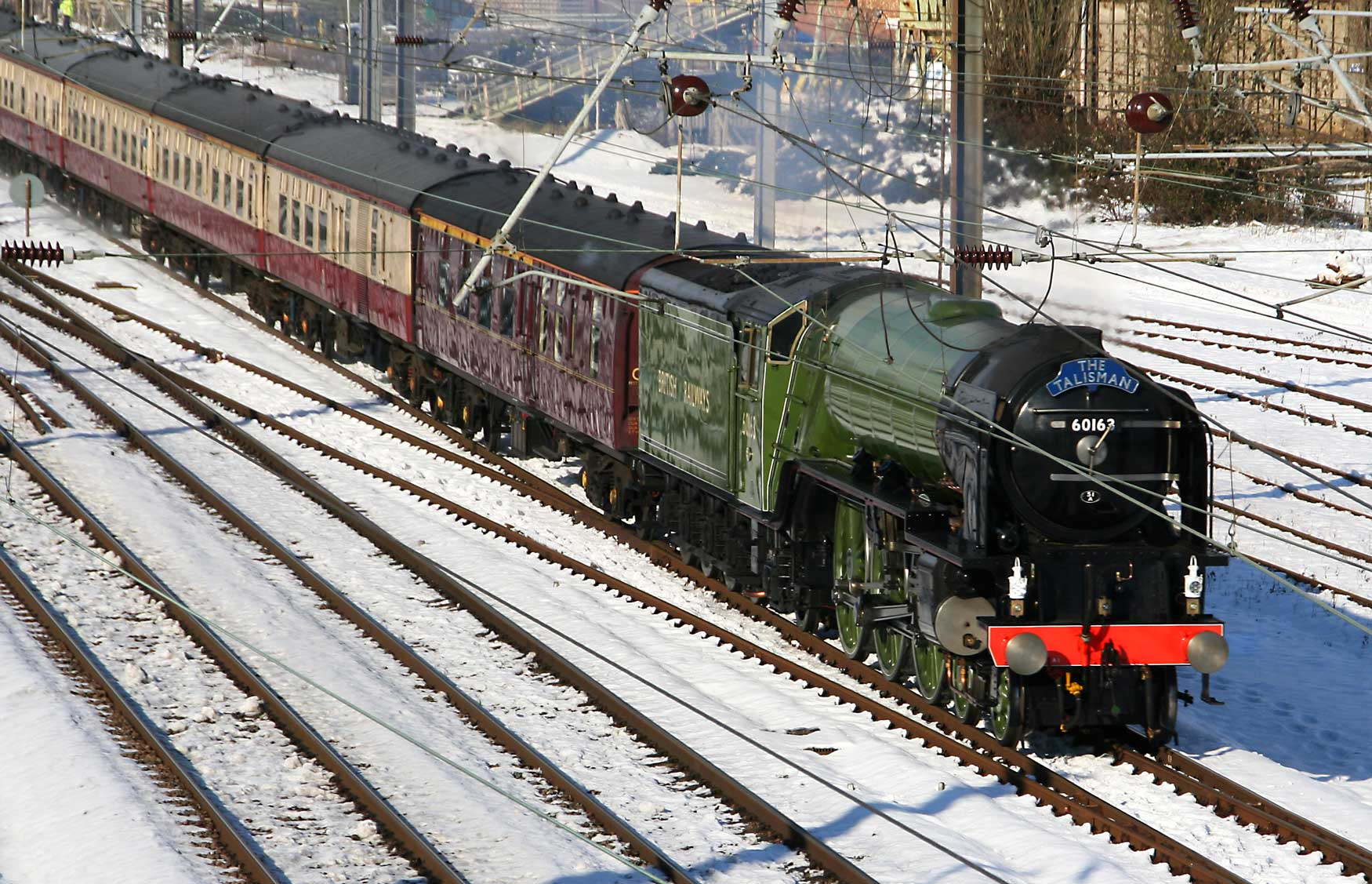
Tornado en route to London King's Cross

It was expected that the first phase of main line operational running would be limited to trips of 200 to 250 miles (400 km). The expanded water capacity of the tender allows legs of over 100 miles (160 km) between water stops, 25 miles (40 km) further than the original Peppercorn A1s. To assist in passenger operation, in 2008 the Trust purchased a Mark 1 composite corridor support coach which entered traffic in 2013. Tornado has a route availability of 9. From 2009, Tornado began to recoup the estimated £800,000 debt from the project.

On 31 January 2009, Tornado completed its first passenger trip on the British mainline, hauling The Peppercorn Pioneer in a return trip from York to Newcastle via Darlington and Durham. The route was a replica of the last tour hauled by the last surviving original Peppercorn A1, 60145 St Mungo, 42 years earlier. The same journey was planned for 1 February, but on advice from the British Transport Police and Network Rail, the second trip ran from Doncaster to Durham with Tornado hauling only part of the return leg. Both trips carried 500 passengers, and were organised for covenanters only. This was followed by its first mainline train available to the wider public on 7 February, hauling the A1 Trust's own The Talisman from Darlington to London King's Cross. Its first departures out of London were to be two circular tours named the Cathedrals Express from Victoria station on 14 February, but the first tour was subsequently changed and left from Waterloo.

In April 2009, Tornado appeared at the LNER-themed event at Barrow Hill Roundhouse where it featured alongside Peppercorn A2 Class 60532 Blue Peter and Class A4s 4498 Sir Nigel Gresley and 4488 Union of South Africa. Blue Peter was repainted in LNER Apple Green livery for display alongside Tornado, and their meeting re-created a scene not witnessed for nearly 50 years. Tornado also posed alongside narrow gauge locomotive No.7 Typhoon of the Romney, Hythe and Dymchurch Railway, recreating an LNER publicity shot held previously with Typhoon and LNER Class A3 4472 Flying Scotsman.

On 21 December, Tornado rescued about 100 people who were stranded by bad weather at London Victoria. A number of electric trains, which pick up their power from the third rail, were unable to run because of snow and ice on the line. Tornado was to haul a Cathedrals Express lunchtime special, but some booked passengers were unable to get there due to the conditions, leaving spare seats. The train's operators decided to offer them to commuters whose trains had been cancelled. Tornado also had an evening Cathedrals Express dining train, and the same offer was again made.

=== Four liveries ===
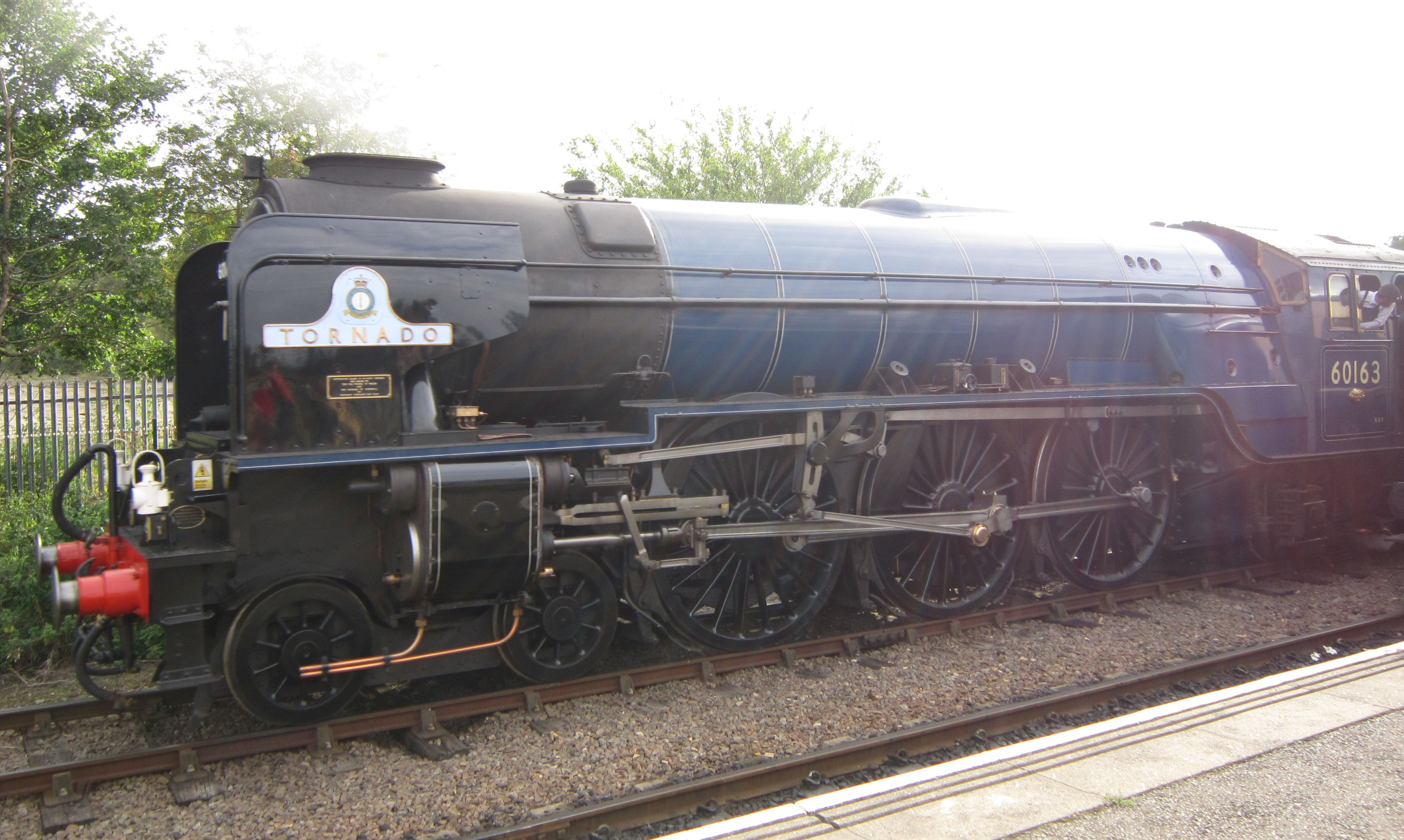
Tornado in its BR blue livery, 2014

The A1 Trust promised to paint Tornado in all four liveries that the original Peppercorn A1s had worn during its first period of operation with its first 10-year boiler certificate. In early 2011, following remedial attention to its boiler in Germany, Tornado unveiled in BR Brunswick Green, which the original class wore in the 1950s. The "British Railways" on the tender was replaced with an emblem and crest. This lasted until its withdrawal for winter maintenance in late 2012, during which it was repainted in BR Express Passenger Blue, the second livery carried by the original class. In 2015, following an intermediate overhaul, Tornado returned to service in its original LNER Apple Green. This lasted until mid-2020 when it was painted in BR Brunswick Green in celebration of the A1 Trust's 30th anniversary, which lasted until its withdrawal for overhaul in 2022, where it was painted back into Apple Green.

=== 100 mph run ===
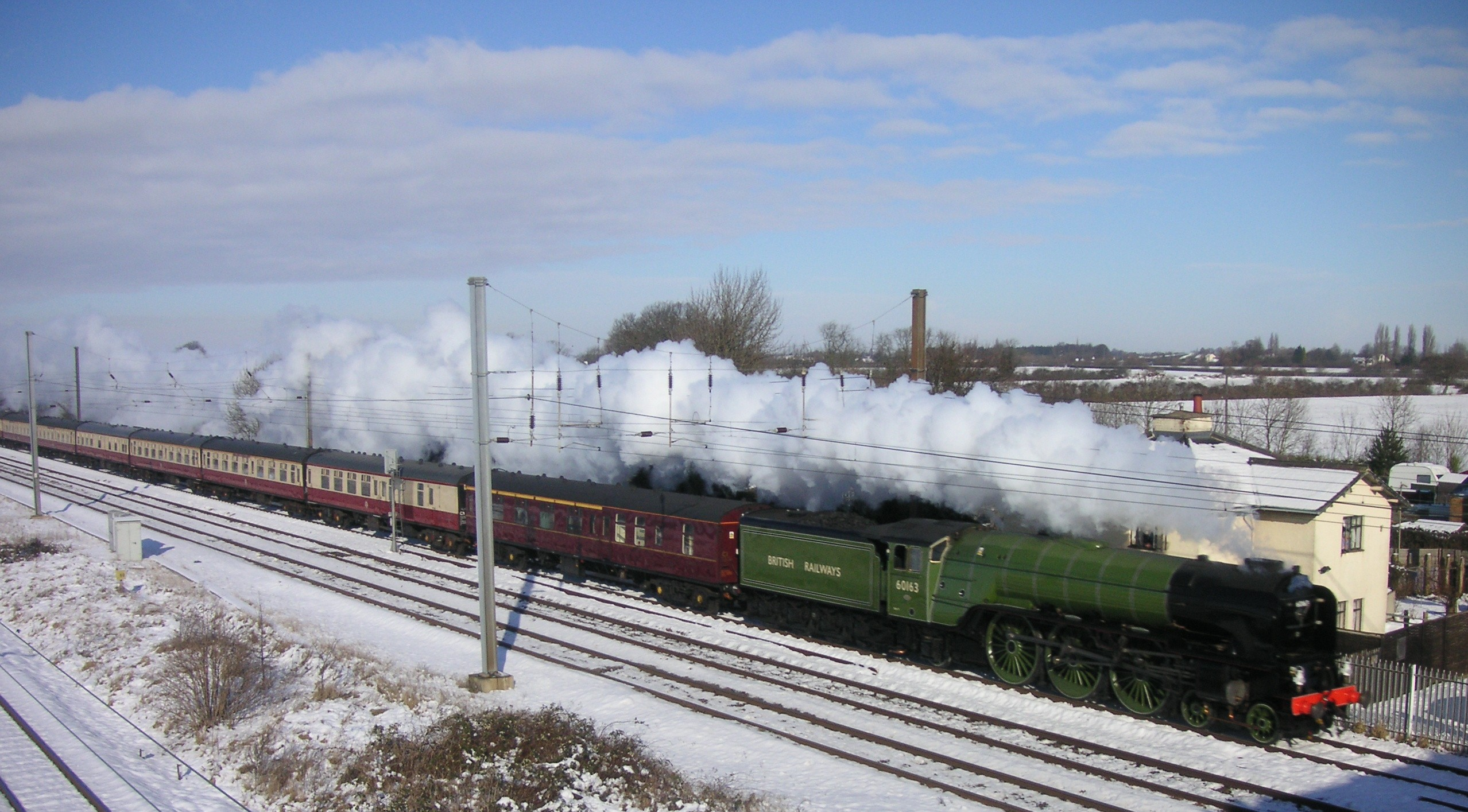
Tornado at speed near Peterborough

The original Peppercorn A1s were easily capable of reaching 100 mph (160 km/h) and in 2004, approval was sought for Tornado to achieve regular 90 mph (140 km/h) operation. While older preserved steam locomotives are subject to speed restrictions due to age, approval for 90 mph (140 km/h) running was possible for Tornado due to its new condition. In January 2009, having gained approval for running at 75 mph (121 km/h), discussions took place about testing Tornado to higher speeds.

In the early hours of 12 April 2017, Tornado achieved 100 mph (160 km/h) during a test run on the East Coast Main Line, becoming the first steam locomotive to reach the speed on the British mainline since 1968. Following this test, Tornado achieved certification to be allowed to run at 90 mph (140 km/h) on the main line, making it the fastest operational steam locomotive in Britain and the second fastest in the world at the time, behind Deutsche Reichsbahn 18.201 which was allowed to run in Germany up to 180 km/h (110 mph).

A programme on the planning, build-up and fulfilment of the project was captured in the BBC film Tornado: The 100mph Steam Engine.

=== 2009–2021 ===
Tornado has hauled trains on the British mainline and heritage railways since 2009, helping to recoup the cost of the project. The A1 Trust has offered driver experiences at the controls of Tornado during visits to heritage lines.

In September 2011, Tornado set a new record for the longest single day trip in Britain by a steam locomotive since the 1960s, pulling The Caledonian Tornado from Crewe to Glasgow and back for over 530 miles (850 km). In 2013, it hauled the first steam-hauled service from London Victoria to Sheffield Park via East Grinstead and the Bluebell Railway since 1963. In 2017, Tornado was used by Northern Rail on scheduled public timetabled services between Appleby and Skipton prior to the reopening of the Settle–Carlisle line, which had been closed for a year because of a landslip. On 14 April 2018, while running at 90 mph (140 km/h) south of Peterborough on The Ebor Flyer from London King's Cross to York, the locomotive's inside motion failed. The subsequent repairs and re-testing took several months to complete.

=== 2021 overhaul ===
In November 2021, Tornado was withdrawn from mainline service after a number of tender wheel flats caused by slippage from falling leaves were detected. Following an appearance at the Great Central Railway in January 2022, the locomotive moved to Loughborough for dismantling and major overhaul. It was to be complete in July, but delays caused by the COVID-19 pandemic while the boiler was being restored at Meiningen Works in Germany, and additional work needed on the driving wheels and tyres, led to its completion date pushed back to the spring of 2023. However problems with the boiler further delayed completion of the work. The overhaul included the installation of European Rail Traffic Management System (ERTMS) in-cab signalling equipment. After completion of overhaul, in May 2024, Tornado was moved to the Great Central Railway to undergo testing under steam as well as installing European Train Control System (ETCS) signalling equipment.

In March 2025, Tornado completed testing to allow the locomotive to run on the main line. In mid-April 2025 Tornado was tested running under ETCS in-cab signalling between Shrewsbury and Welshpool on the Cambrian Line in Wales.

== Funding ==
Tornado carries a plaque bearing the following message:

This locomotive was built and paid for by people who shared a vision and were determined to turn it into reality

=== Fundraising ===
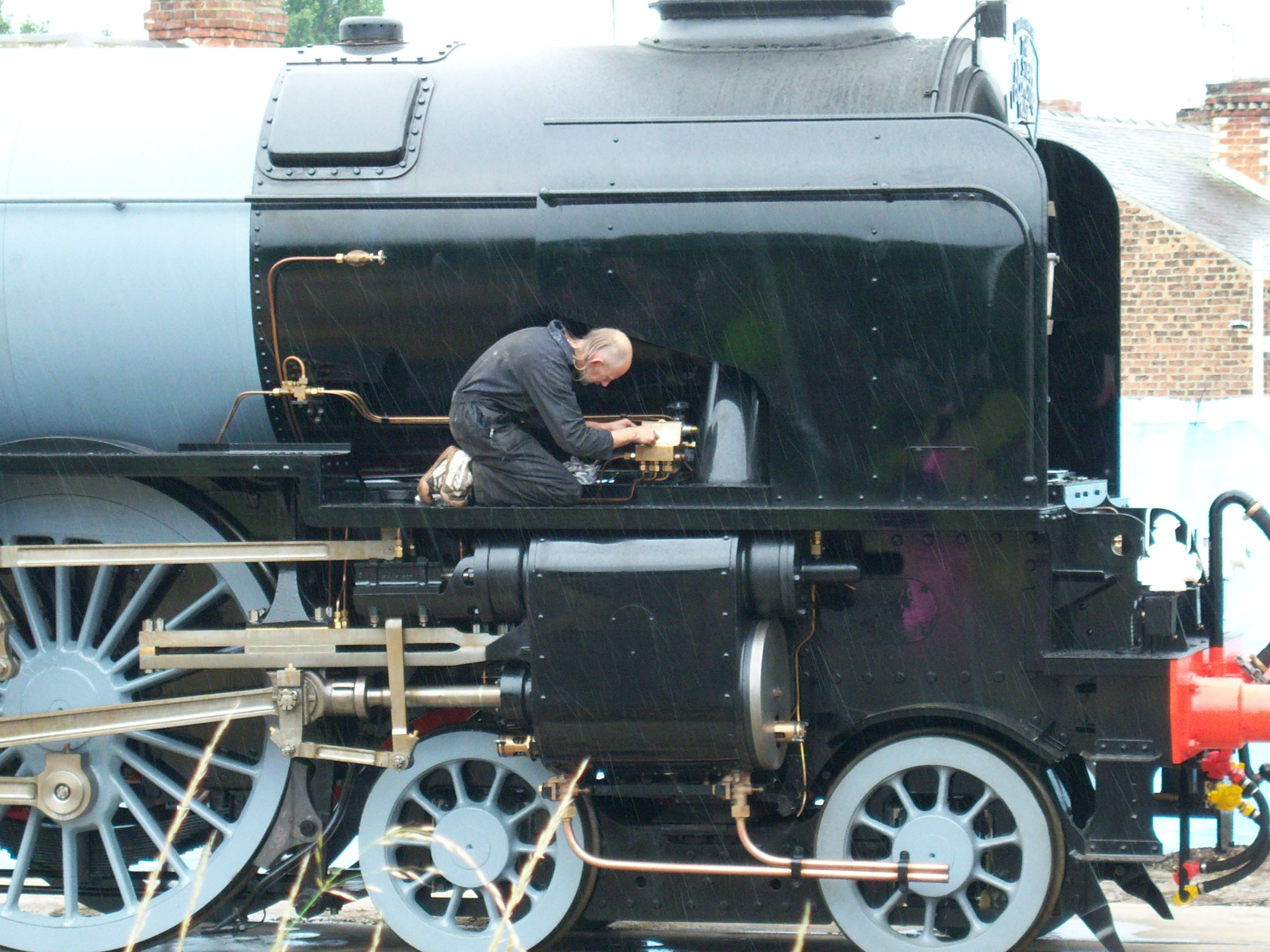
A project volunteer prepares Tornado for operation.

Tornado was built by the Locomotive Construction Co Ltd, a wholly owned subsidiary of the A1 Steam Locomotive Trust. At 1990s prices, the projected cost of the project was £1.6 million.

The trust has used Deeds of Covenant since the start of the project in 1990, marketed under the slogan "Build a main line loco for the price of a pint of beer a week!" Covenantors can wear a special A1 Trust tie and pay a fixed amount monthly by standing order, and for this they receive honour roll recognition, event and viewing priority, regular trust publications and the right to attend the annual conventions.

In September 1996, the concept of dedicated covenants was launched. Now renamed dedicated donations, these were one-off payments of £25 to £25,000 to sponsor a particular part. As with regular covenantors, dedicated donors receive recognition, and an engineering drawing of the component they sponsored.

In October 1999 a £250,000 appeal was launched to fund the boiler, whose absence was noticeable with Tornado then comprising a wheeled frame with completed cab and smokebox. As Tornado began to look like a locomotive with the mating of the frame with the wheelset in the autumn of 2000, fundraising progress increased, breaking previous records by recruiting 100 new covenantors in two months. By 2005, the trust had raised over £1.5m.

Completion of the boiler was achieved through a half-million pound bond issue. Following securing of the boiler funds, the last major part, the tender, was achieved with a £200,000 single sponsor donation.

By May 2008, £2.5m had been raised and spent, and the gap to the required £3m had been raised to complete Tornado. However, due to the Chinese economic boom causing raw materials cost increases, together with increased certification costs, a further £50,000 appeal had to be launched if main line running was to be achieved by September.

By the end of September 2008, the Trust still needed to raise £66,000 to pay for tests and trials to allow main line operation. While at the GCR, the project costs were running at the rate of £10,000 a month, rising to "six-figure bills" for certification in the months up to January 2009.

Launched in 2004, the Trust's half-million pound bond issue offered 4% returns, but in January 2009 £100,000 worth of these bonds remained unsubscribed.

=== Sponsorship ===
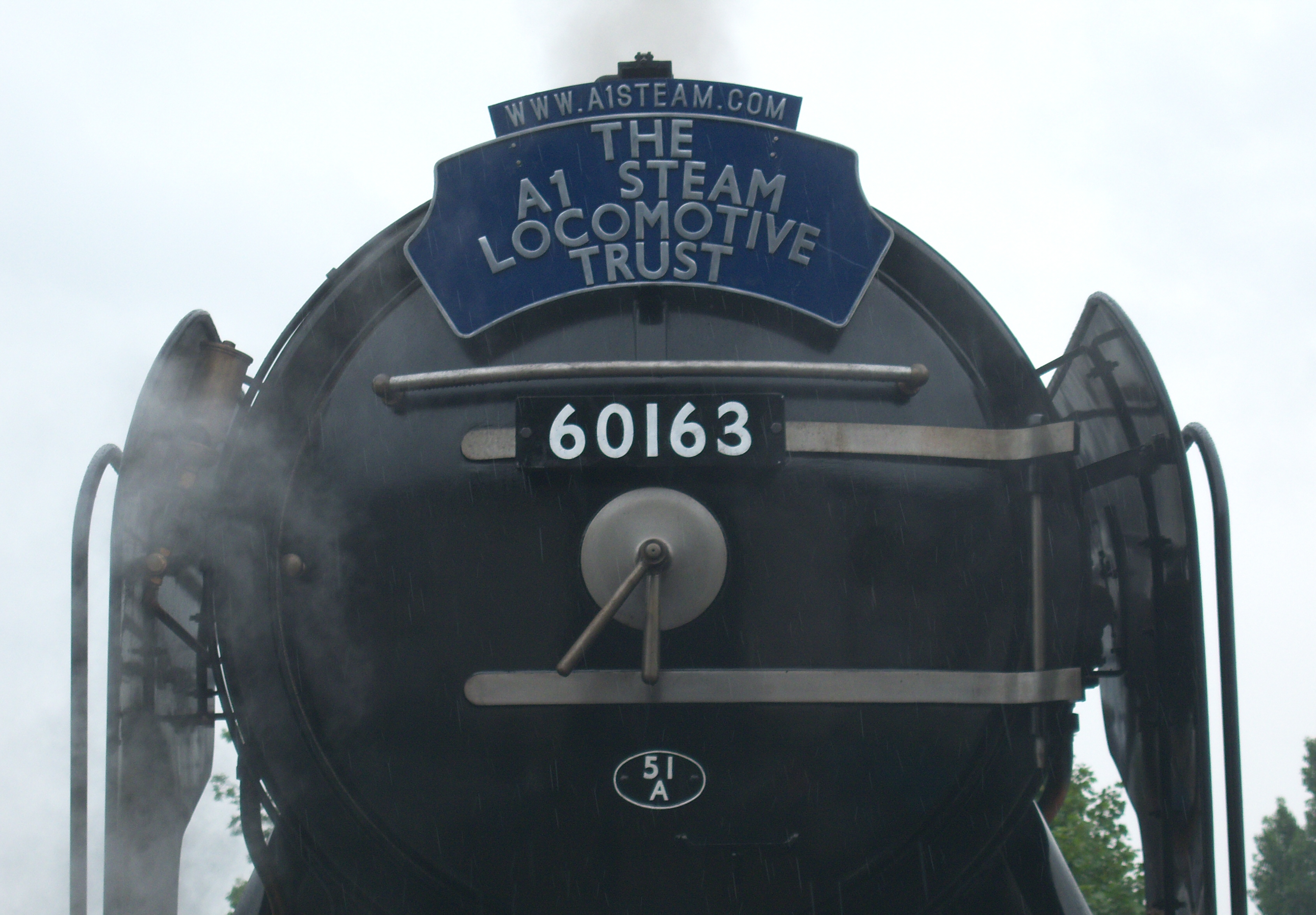
The A1 Trust headboard, locomotive number 60163 and shed code 51 A

In 1994 the A1 trust gained its first major sponsor, William Cook Cast Products. In 1997, Great North Eastern Railway (GNER), the then operator on the East Coast Main Line, became a sponsor, and decorated Darlington station for the event, as well as offering free travel for trust workers. The trust gained Rolls-Royce as a sponsor in spring 1998. The trust's principal sponsor is William Cook Cast Products, which initially cast the driving wheels on "very advantageous terms", and later assisted with all the wheels and almost all other steel castings. As with GNER, Tornado's links to the East Coast Main Line brought with it support from the next incumbent operator, National Express East Coast, with sponsorship of the third main line test run to Newcastle. Significant savings were made through industrial sponsorship; by 1998 this was keeping costs at 40% of normal. Some components, such as the smokebox door, were even obtained free of charge.

=== Other income ===
Cost savings of a third of the original manufacturing costs were possible in some cases where the building of one locomotive allowed for cheaper construction methods, such as using one-off polystyrene casting patterns.

Several other events and fund-raising drives have assisted in funding the project, including a Land's End to John O'Groats bike ride. The Trust also received proceeds from the sale of limited edition models of Tornado in works grey livery.

A new book on the story of Tornado called Tornado 21st Century Steam, written by The Guardian's Jonathan Glancey, was released on 15 October 2010.

== Media ==
A BBC film crew filmed the project at certain points on the journey, up to and including the arrival and operation of Tornado running at the GCR. The resulting film was used to make a 30-minute documentary film, Absolutely Chuffed: The Men Who Built a Steam Engine. It was first broadcast on BBC Four on 16 October 2008, as part of their Golden Age of Steam season. The film was released on Region 2 DVD on 28 December 2009 with unseen material and DVD extras.

Tornado and the Tornado project was also partly featured in the BBC Four documentary episode The Last Days of Steam (series 8 of the Time Shift documentaries), and also on How Do They Do It? (channel Five version, season 3 episode 3). The project also featured on BBC 2's magazine programme Working Lunch broadcast on 3 December 2007.

=== Top Gear Race to the North ===
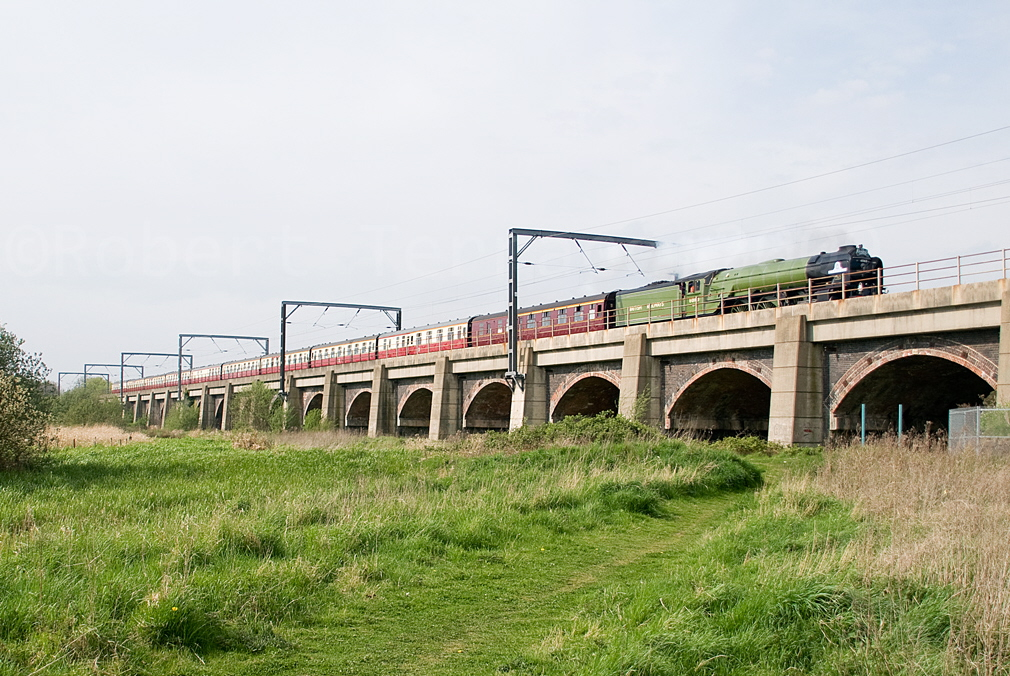
Tornado crossing the Bawtry viaduct in South Yorkshire during the Top Gear Race to the North

On 25 April 2009, Tornado hauled a 10-coach Cathedrals Express charter from London King's Cross to Edinburgh Waverley. This private train was filmed by the BBC for a retro Top Gear Race, in which Jeremy Clarkson on the train raced James May in a Jaguar XK120 and Richard Hammond on a Vincent Black Shadow motorbike. Tornado was booked to complete the 390.2-mile (628.0 km) journey in 8 hours 2 minutes, without any passenger stops at stations, but with four water stops en route at Grantham, York, Tyne Yard and Berwick, totalling 95 minutes booked stoppage time. Because motorways did not exist in 1949 (the first not being built until 1959) May and Hammond were restricted to using A-roads. In a close finish, Tornado came second behind the Jaguar, with a difference of only about ten minutes between them. The train was formed from the maroon support coach and a uniform rake of nine Royal Scot blood and custard coaches. The race featured in the first episode of the show's 13th series, airing on 21 June 2009.

=== In film ===
60163 Tornado, as well as LMS Hughes Crab no. 13065, appeared in the 2017 film, Paddington 2.

== Models ==
A "very limited edition" customised model from The Model Centre (TMC), based on the Bachmann OO scale model in grey livery helped raise funds for the project. Another grey works Tornado was to be made by TMC but with National Express on its tender from its 18 November main line test run.

Bachmann released a Tornado model in BR Apple Green livery just before Christmas 2009. Unlike the TMC models, which featured a standard Bachmann A1 repainted in Tornado's then grey livery, and unlike the original Bachmann limited-edition model of Tornado which had the locomotive in BR Brunswick Green livery with the late BR crest, the 2009 release was a new model, with most (although not all) of the detail differences applied. This is particularly evident on the tender, which features the enlarged water capacity and reduced coal storage of Tornado as compared to the original A1 locomotives. The model proved extremely popular, to the extent that 10 weeks after going on sale Bachmann stocks were exhausted and more models had to be ordered.

Since 2011, Hornby Railways have produced a model of Tornado in 00 gauge.

Graham Farish have produced a model in N scale.

For their 2013/2014 range, Bachmann released an Express Passenger Blue model of Tornado which is a standard repaint and slightly modified Peppercorn A1 Pacific.

Darstaed Models are to manufacture an O scale model of Tornado using tinplate. The model will feature traditional three-rail electric pick up.

Accucraft (UK) make a live steam model of Tornado in gauge 1.

== See also ==
- LMS-Patriot Project
- Pennsylvania Railroad 5550
- GWR 6800 Class 6880 Betton Grange
- Steam locomotives of the 21st century
