= Mexborough engine shed =

Coordinates: 53.4914°N 1.2894°W

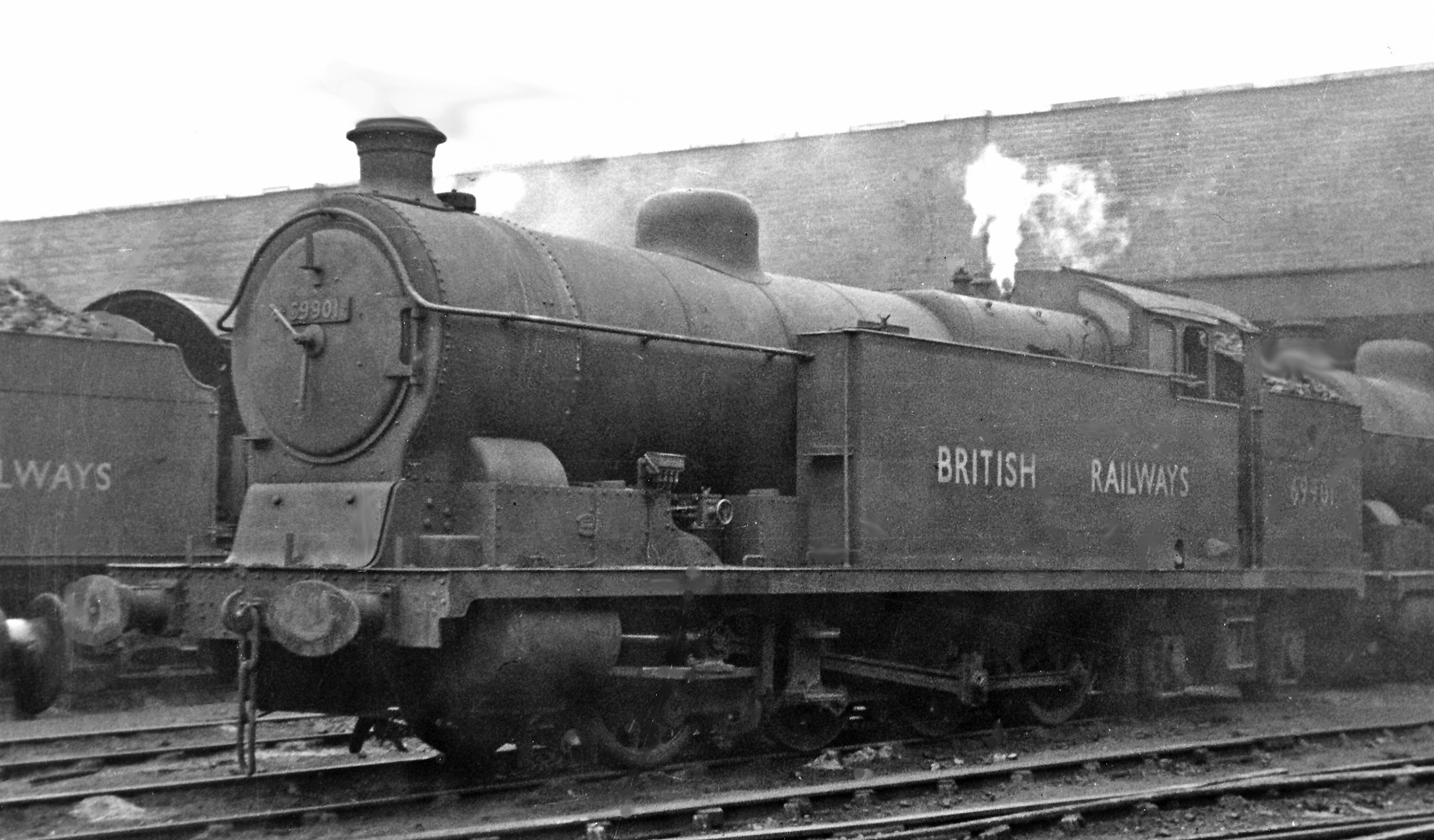
Ex-GCR 0-8-4T shunting engine at Mexborough Loco in April 1949

Mexborough engine shed was an engine shed in Swinton, in South Yorkshire, England. It was built by the Great Central Railway and opened in 1875. The shed was built slightly to the west of the current Mexborough station on land between the River Don and the River Don Navigation. It had 15 dead end roads, and could handle about 150 steam locomotives, mainly for use on freight trains. The London and North Eastern Railway operated the shed from 1923. In 1948, on the formation of British Railways Eastern Region, Mexborough bore the shed code 36B, then 41F from 1958. It closed in February 1964.

Most of the locomotives stabled at Mexborough were used for hauling coal trains. The coal originated from the many collieries in the South Yorkshire coalfield and wagons of coal were despatched to locations all over the country. However, the main destinations were the industries and power stations in Lancashire. With the opening of the Wath marshalling yard in 1907, Mexborough supplied locomotives for collecting wagons from the collieries, for re-marshalling of the wagons at Wath and for hauling coal trains across the steeply-graded "Woodhead" route across the Pennines into Lancashire. In the 1920s, the depot was the stabling point for what was then the most powerful locomotive in the UK, the London & North Eastern Railway's Class U1 Garratt. It was used for banking heavy coal trains up the Worsborough incline on the Woodhead route.

In 1942 during the Second World War, three former Great Eastern Railway LNER J15 locomotives were drafted-in to assist with coal traffic.

In the 1950s, the route from Wath to Manchester was electrified. Consequently, the demand for the steam locomotives from the Mexborough depot reduced. The electric locomotives were stabled at Wath rather than Mexborough. Even the steam shunting engines for the marshalling work at Wath yard were replaced by diesel shunters in 1957. The use of steam locomotives for collecting coal from local collieries was also phased out and the depot closed in 1964. The site of Mexborough depot is now occupied by units in an industrial estate off of Meadow Way in Swinton. In its heyday, the depot had its own football team, Mexborough Locomotive Works F.C.

== Locomotives ==
On 1 January 1923 the following classes of locomotive were allocated to Mexborough.

GCR class	LNER Class	Wheel Arrangement	No. allocated	Remarks
GCR Class 8	B5	4-6-0	7	Initially built for fast fish traffic and known as “Fish Engines”
GCR Class 9K	C13	4-4-2T	2	Worked local passenger services
GCR Classes 2 & 2A	D7	4-4-0	6	Worked local/medium distance passenger services
GCR Classes 11B, 11C, & 11D	D9	4-4-0	1	Worked local/medium distance passenger services
GCR Classes 9D, 9H & 9M	J10	0-6-0	3	Freight locomotives
GCR Class 9J	J11	0-6-0	2	Freight locomotives
GCR Class 6C	J12	0-6-0	27	Freight locomotives – occasionally used on excursions
GCR Class 9	J13	0-6-0	5	Freight locomotives
GCR Class 18T Altered	J59	0-6-0 T	4	Yard shunting engines nicknamed Humpies.
GCR Class 9A & 9A Altered	N4	0-6-2T	1	Shunting and trip engines
GCR Class 9C, 9F, & 9O	N5	0-6-2T	15	Shunting and trip engines
GCR Class 8K	O4	2-8-0	51	Freight locomotives
GCR Class 8M	O5	2-8-0	6	Freight locomotives
GCR Class 8A	Q4	0-8-0	36	Freight locomotives
GCR Class 8H	S1	0-8-4T	4	This was the entire class although the LNER built two more in the 1930s. Used for shunting in Wath marshalling yard.

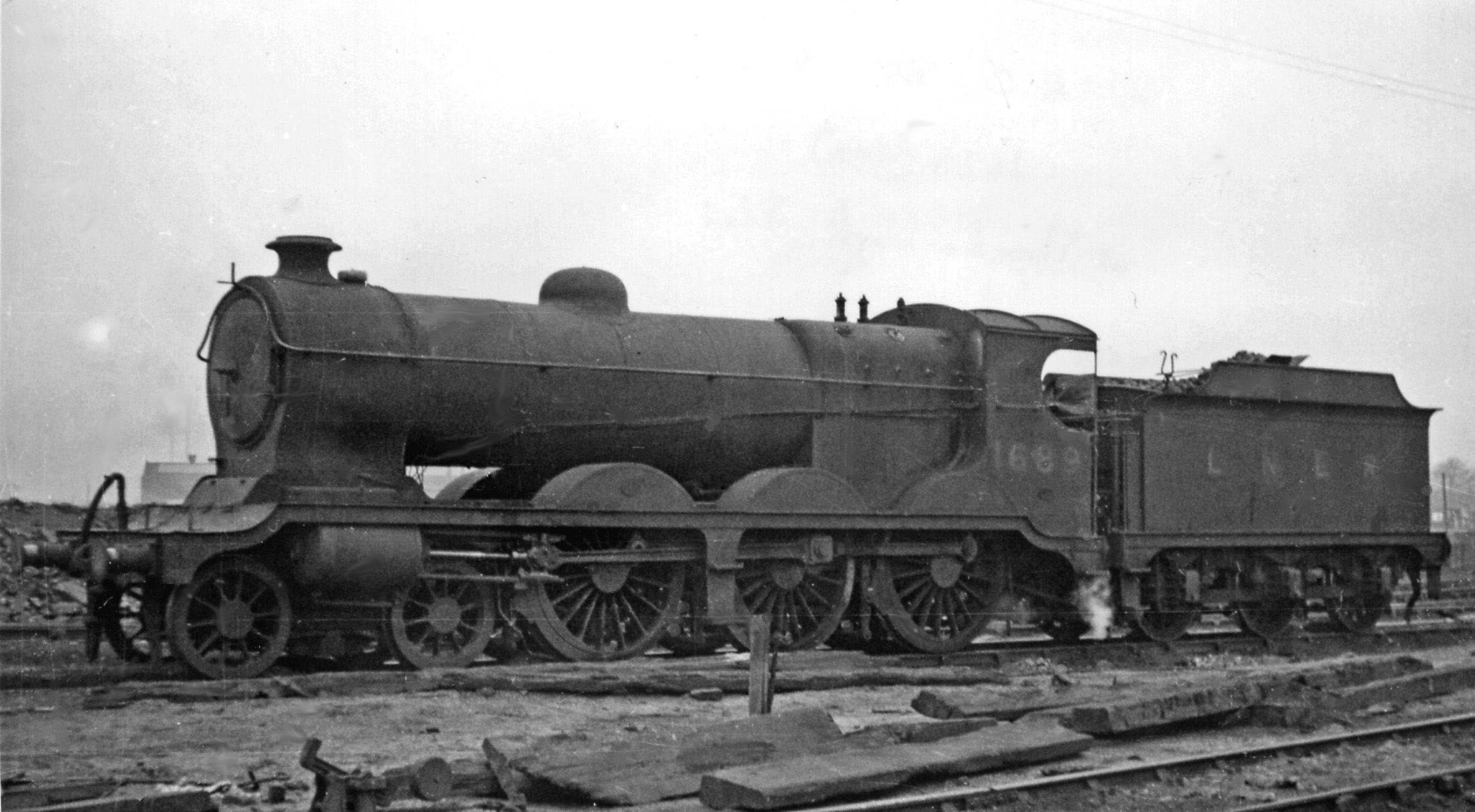
Mexborough Locomotive Depot geograph-2613006-by-Ben-Brooksbank

In 1950, locomotive classes allocated to Mexborough included:

- LNER Thompson Class B1 4-6-0
- LNER Class O2 2-8-0
- LNER Class J11 0-6-0
- LNER Class J50 0-6-0T
- LNER Class N5 0-6-2T
- WD Austerity 2-8-0
