= GCR Class 8N =

Class of British steam locomotives

Great Central Railway Class 8N LNER B6
Type and origin
- Power type: Steam
- Designer: John G. Robinson
- Builder: Gorton works
- Build date: 1918 (1), 1921 (2)
- Total produced: 3
Specifications
- Configuration
  - Whyte: 4-6-0
  - UIC: 2'Cn2
- Gauge: 4 ft 8 1/2 in (1,435 mm)
- Leading dia.: 3 ft 6 in (1.067 m)
- Driver dia.: 5 ft 8 in (1.727 m)
- Wheelbase: 50 ft 8.5 in (15.456 m)
- Length: 61 ft 2.5 in (18.656 m)
- Loco weight: 72.9 long tons (74.1 t)
- Tender weight: 48.3 long tons (49.1 t)
- Fuel type: Coal
- Fuel capacity: 6 long tons 0 cwt (13,400 lb or 6.1 t)
- Water cap.: 4,000 imp gal (18,000 L; 4,800 US gal)
- Firebox
  - Grate area: 26.24 sq ft (2.438 m^{2})
- Boiler
  - Diameter: 5 ft 6 in (1,680 mm)
- Boiler pressure: 180 lbf/in^{2} (1.24 MPa)
- Heating surface: 2,123 sq ft (197.2 m^{2})
- Superheater
  - Heating area: 308 sq ft (28.6 m^{2})
- Cylinders: Two, outside
- Cylinder size: 21 in × 26 in (533 mm × 660 mm)
- Valve gear: Stephenson
- Valve type: Piston valves
Performance figures
- Tractive effort: 25,798 lbf (114.76 kN)
Career
- Operators: GCR; →LNER
- Class: GCR: 8N; LNER: B6
- Number in class: 3
- Numbers: GCR: 52-3, 416; LNER: 5416 5052-3; later 1346-8
- Retired: 1947
- Disposition: All scrapped

The Great Central Railway Class 8N - London North Eastern Railway Class B6 - was a class of three 4-6-0 steam locomotives, designed by John G. Robinson in 1918. They were a mixed traffic class. All three examples were withdrawn in November and December 1947.

== Design ==
The first member of the class (No. 416) was built 1918, in the middle of a batch of GCR Class 8M 2-8-0 locomotives and the design had an identical boiler, cylinders and motion to this class. For three years this remained the only example of the class, but in 1921 Robinson built two further examples, with the intention of comparing their performance with his four-cylinder GCR Class 9P design and later decided to produce more of the 9Ps. The 8N was intended as an improved version of the 1A (LNER B8 class) of 1913, which had large inside cylinders and relatively small axleboxes on the driving axles. Although 8N was an improvement of the 1A design, .The 9P design of 1917 had four cylinders, resulting in a more balanced locomotive with smaller cylinders.

== Allocation and work ==
Although very competent locomotives, the three examples of this class were non-standard and used on a variety of secondary freight and passenger duties over the former Great Central Railway system. They were eventually replaced in 1947 by members of the B1 class. No examples survived.
