= GCR Class 8G =

Class of British steam locomotives

GCR Class 8G LNER Class B9
Type and origin
- Power type: Steam
- Designer: John G. Robinson
- Builder: Beyer, Peacock & Co.
- Build date: 1906
- Total produced: 10
Specifications
- Configuration
  - Whyte: 4-6-0
  - UIC: 2'C
- Gauge: 4 ft 8 1/2 in (1,435 mm)
- Leading dia.: 3 ft 6 in (1.067 m)
- Driver dia.: 5 ft 4 in (1.626 m)
- Wheelbase: 27 ft 6 in (8.4 m)
- Length: 60 ft 9 1/4 in (18.523 m)
- Axle load: 18 long tons (18 t)
- Loco weight: 67.3 long tons (68.4 t)
- Tender weight: 48.3 long tons (49.1 t)
- Total weight: 115.6 long tons (117.5 t)
- Fuel type: Coal
- Firebox
  - Grate area: 23.75 sq ft (2.21 m^{2})
- Boiler
  - Diameter: 4 ft 9 1/2 in (1,460 mm) to 5 ft 0 in (1.5 m) outside
- Boiler pressure: 180 psi (1.24 MPa)
- Heating surface
  - Firebox: 133 sq ft (12.4 m^{2})
  - Total surface: 1,951 sq ft (181.3 m^{2}); Dia. 17 boiler: 1,338 sq ft (124.3 m^{2})
- Superheater
  - Heating area: Dia. 17 boiler: 230 sq ft (21 m^{2})
- Cylinders: Two, outside
- Cylinder size: 19 in × 26 in (483 mm × 660 mm)
- Valve gear: Stephenson valve gear
- Valve type: Slide
Performance figures
- Tractive effort: 22,438 lbf (99.8 kN) @ 85% boiler pressure
Career
- Operators: Great Central Railway; → London & North Eastern Railway; → British Railways
- Withdrawn: 1947-1949
- Disposition: All scrapped

GCR Class 8G was a class of 10 two-cylinder steam locomotives of the 4-6-0 wheel arrangement built in 1906 for the Great Central Railway.

== GCR era ==
The locomotive was designed in 1906 and drew heavily from the GCR Class 8F - the biggest difference being that the driving wheels were 1 ft 3 in smaller. Production of the 10 locomotives commenced as soon as the last Class 8F was built. The Class 8Gs used a boiler that had the same diameter as that fitted to both the Class 8F and the Class 8C, but it had a shorter firebox similar to that fitted to the original Class 8s.

== Post-merger ==
Following the merger of the GCR into the London & North Eastern Railway, the class became known as the LNER Class B9. Immediately after the merger, the LNER began converting the class to use superheated boilers - a project that finished in 1929 with all 10 having been converted. These boilers were identical to those used on the LNER Class Q4, and Gresley's anti-vacuum valves were also fitted at the same time. Saturated engines were classified as the Class B9/1, and superheated engines as the Class B9/2. Despite the last B9/1 being converted to a superheated boiler in 1929, the B9/2 class was not renamed to B9 until 1937.

An experimental locomotive conversion was made in 1924 - when No. 6109 was fitted with a superheater, it also gained larger 21" diameter cylinders and piston valves. Despite a large improvement in performance, no further conversions were made, possibly due to both the cost of modification, and the fact that the LNER Class J11 were equally adept at performing the same roles as the Class B9s.

== Usage ==
Prior to the creation of the LNER, the Class 8G locomotives were allocated to Gorton and Lincoln. They worked the main goods (Gorton-based locomotives) and fast goods (Lincoln-based locomotives) lines into and out of Manchester. After the grouping, in 1926 all Lincoln locomotives had been moved to Gorton, but 4 moved to Trafford Park in 1927. As LNER locomotives, the Class B9s were still used primarily as goods locomotives, but they did occasionally see use on stopping passenger services and race day specials to both Aintree and Haydock Park. Following the end of the Second World War, the locomotives were allocated to Trafford Park, Stockport and Liverpool, being used for freight services and, in emergencies, passenger services between Liverpool and Manchester.

== Withdrawal ==
In 1939, No. 6111 was the first to be withdrawn, but was quickly returned to service after the outbreak of World War II. After the war, withdrawals began again in 1947, and the last locomotive to be withdrawn, ironically that very same No. 6111, was withdrawn in May 1949. No examples survived into preservation.
