= GCR Class 11E =

Class of British steam locomotives

GCR Class 11E LNER Class D10
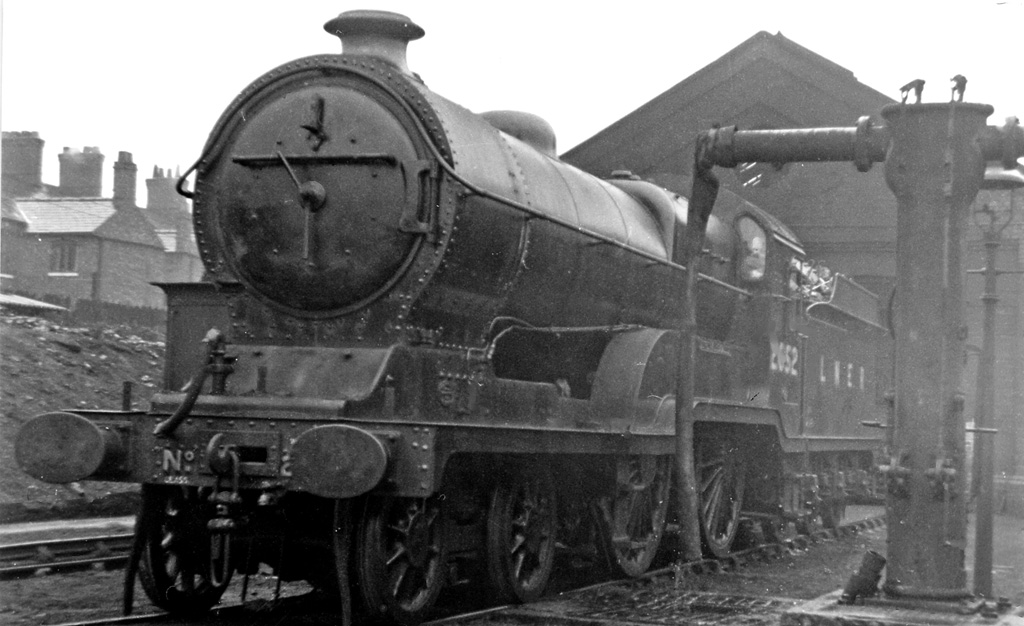
- No. 2652 Edwin A. Beazley at Northwich MPD in 1947
Type and origin
- Power type: Steam
- Designer: John G. Robinson
- Builder: GCR, at Gorton Works
- Build date: 1913
- Total produced: 10
Specifications
- Configuration
  - Whyte: 4-4-0
  - UIC: 2'Bh2
- Gauge: 4 ft 8 1/2 in (1,435 mm)
- Leading dia.: 3 ft 6 in (1,070 mm)
- Driver dia.: 6 ft 9 in (2,060 mm)
- Wheelbase: 48 ft 8 1/2 in (14,846 mm)
- Length: 58 ft 11 1/2 in (17,970 mm)
- Axle load: 19.8 long tons (20.1 t)
- Adhesive weight: 39.6 long tons (40.2 t)
- Loco weight: 61 long tons (62 t)
- Tender weight: 48.3 long tons (49.1 t)
- Total weight: 109.3 long tons (111.1 t)
- Fuel type: Coal
- Fuel capacity: 6 long tons (6.1 t)
- Water cap.: 4,000 imp gal (18,000 L)
- Firebox
  - Grate area: 26.5 sq ft (2.46 m^{2})
- Boiler
  - Diameter: 5 ft 0.5 in (1,537 mm) to 5 ft 3 in (1,600 mm)
- Boiler pressure: 180 psi (1.2 MPa)
- Heating surface
  - Firebox: 155 sq ft (14.4 m^{2})
  - Tubes: 972 sq ft (90.3 m^{2})
  - Flues: 416 sq ft (38.6 m^{2})
  - Total surface: 1,543 sq ft (143.3 m^{2})
- Superheater
  - Type: Robinson, 24 elements
  - Heating area: 209 sq ft (19.4 m^{2})
- Cylinders: Two, inside
- Cylinder size: 20 in × 26 in (508 mm × 660 mm)
- Valve gear: Stephenson
- Valve type: 10 inches (250 mm) piston valves (outside admission)
- Train heating: Steam
- Loco brake: Steam
- Train brakes: Vacuum
Performance figures
- Tractive effort: 19,644 lbf (87.38 kN)
Career
- Operators: Great Central Railway; → London and North Eastern Railway; → British Railways
- Class: GCR: 11E; LNER: D10
- Power class: BR: 3P
- Number in class: 10
- Numbers: GCR: 429–438; LNER: 5429–38; then 2650–59; BR: 62650–59
- Nicknames: Directors
- Axle load class: LNER/BR: RA 6
- Withdrawn: 1953–55
- Disposition: All scrapped

The GCR Class 11E was a type of 4-4-0 steam locomotive used by the Great Central Railway for express passenger services. Ten were built in the railway's own workshops at Gorton, Manchester during 1913; they remained in service until the mid-1950s.

== History ==
In the early part of the 20th century, the Great Central Railway (GCR) had favoured the 4-4-0 wheel arrangement for express passenger services. They had bought 40 such locomotives to the design of their Locomotive Engineer, John G. Robinson (Robinson became Chief Mechanical Engineer in 1902), between 1901 and 1904, and these formed Class 11B. These were found to be too small, and subsequently several classes of 4-4-2 and 4-6-0 locomotive were introduced for express passenger trains, with the 4-4-2 type predominating. After the Class 1 4-6-0, which were larger than any of the others, proved disappointing, Robinson decided to reduce the size of these and designed a 4-4-0 which became Class 11E. Ten were built in 1913, and were immediately successful.

Compared to the Class 1 4-6-0, the omission of one coupled axle allowed a longer wheelbase between two adjacent axles of a 4-4-0 than with the 4-6-0, so the firebox could be positioned between the axles instead of on top of one of them; thus it could be deeper, giving better draughting which aided steaming. The shorter overall length meant that the boiler tubes were shorter, which also improved draughting.

Unusually, outside admission was used for the piston valves of the cylinders. Conventionally, piston valve locomotives had inside admission, whereas outside admission was used with slide valve locomotives. Outside admission gives a shorter exhaust passage, with the consequent advantages of a lower back pressure and sharper blast, but with the disadvantage that the valve spindle glands must be made to withstand much higher pressures and temperatures. Robinson had previously used outside admission for his Class 11D rebuilds from Class 11B, and the new class 11E used the same cylinder casting as those rebuilds. When further 4-4-0s of similar capability to class 11E were required after World War I, these were given normal cylinders with inside admission for the piston valves, and so were placed in Class 11F.

Withdrawal occurred between March 1953 and November 1955.

== Accidents and incidents ==
On 27 February 1927, locomotive No. 5437 Prince George was hauling an express passenger train that was involved in a collision with a light engine at Penistone, Yorkshire.

== Numbers and names ==
Number	Built	Name	Withdrawn
429	August 1913	Sir Alexander Henderson	February 1954
430	September 1913	Purdon Viccars	March 1953
431	October 1913	Edwin A. Beazley	May 1954
432	October 1913	Sir Edward Fraser	October 1955
433	October 1913	Walter Burgh Gair	August 1953
434	November 1913	The Earl of Kerry	August 1953
435	November 1913	Sir Clement Royds	January 1955
436	November 1913	Sir Berkeley Sheffield	March 1953
437	November 1913	Charles Stuart Wortley	August 1955
438	December 1913	Worsley Taylor	November 1954

The original names were those of directors of the GCR; Sir Alexander Henderson was the chairman of the board, and William Purdon Viccars was deputy chairman. At the time, there were twelve members of the GCR Board; of these, two (Viscount Cross and Sir Alexander Henderson) already had locomotives named after them. However, the latter's name was removed from Class 11B No. 1014 and used on Class 11E No. 429, so one director was not honoured at this stage; this was rectified the following year when Class 1A 4-6-0 No. 439 was named Sutton Nelthorpe.

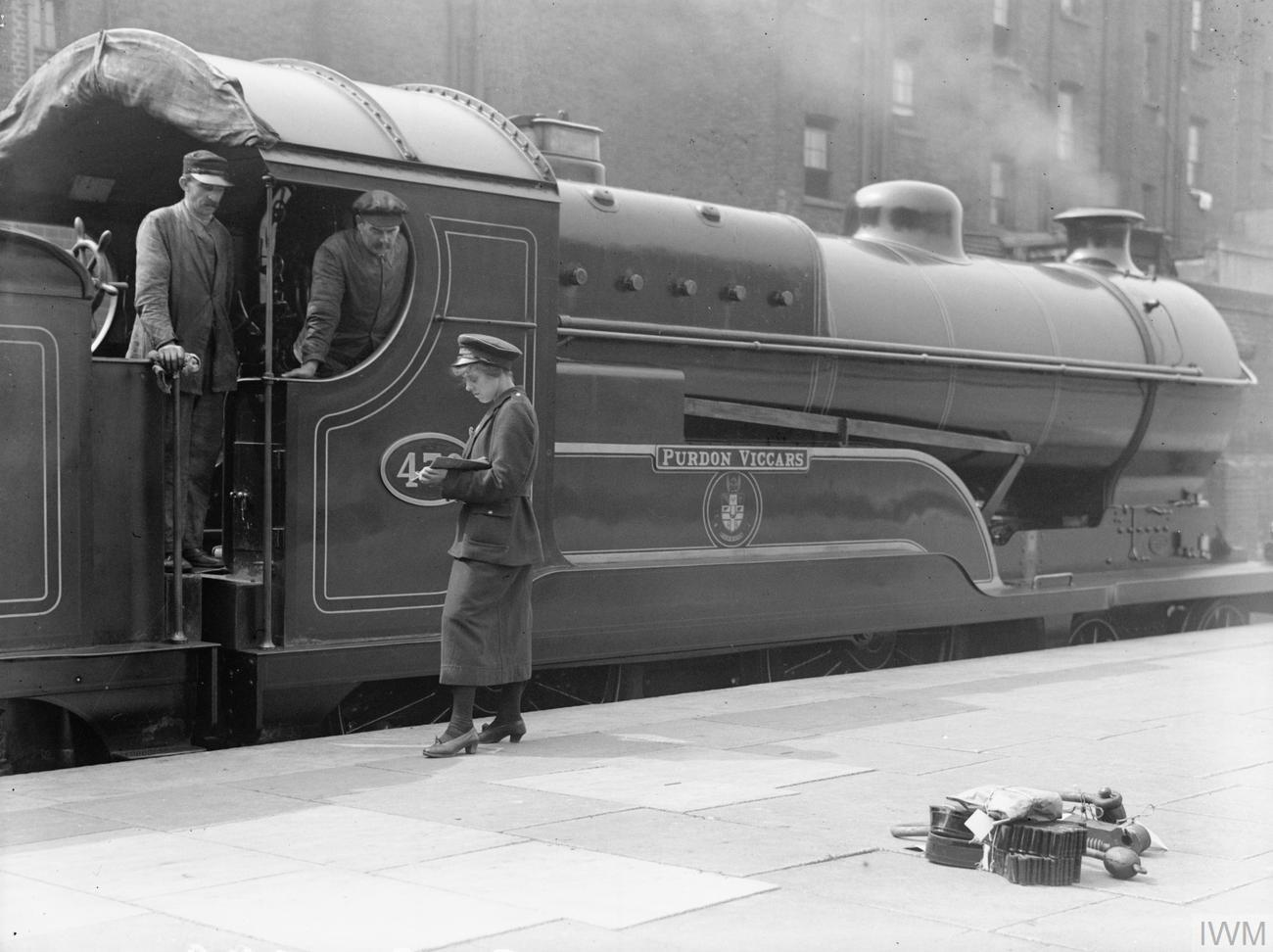
No 430 Purdon Viccars in 1918.

Two locomotives had their names altered subsequently, one of them twice. Sir Alexander Henderson was created Baron Faringdon in 1916, but his new name was used on a Class 9P 4-6-0, so in 1917 No. 429 was renamed Sir Douglas Haig after the Commander-in-Chief of the British Expeditionary Force. In turn, Sir Douglas was created Earl Haig in 1919 and his new name used on another Class 9P 4-6-0, so No. 429 was renamed a second time, becoming Prince Henry c. 1920 after the fourth child of King George V. When Charles Stuart-Wortley was raised to the peerage as Baron Stuart of Wortley in 1917, his name was used on a further class 9P, so no. 437 was renamed Prince George c. 1920 after the fifth child of King George V.

After the 1923 Grouping, the LNER increased the GCR numbers by 5000, this occurring in 1924–5. Under the 1946 renumbering, they became 2650–9 in the same order. During 1948–50, British Railways increased these numbers by 60000.
