= B19 =

B19 or B-19 may refer to:

- B19 (New York City bus), serving Brooklyn
- Douglas XB-19, an experimental bomber aircraft
- Parvovirus B19, the virus that causes fifth disease
- Caro–Kann Defence ECO code in chess
- Patient B-19
- Boron-19 (B-19 or ^{19}B), an isotope of boron
- LNER Class B19, classified B2 until 1945
