= GCR Class 9P =

Class of British steam locomotives (1917–1920)

GCR Class 9P LNER Class B3
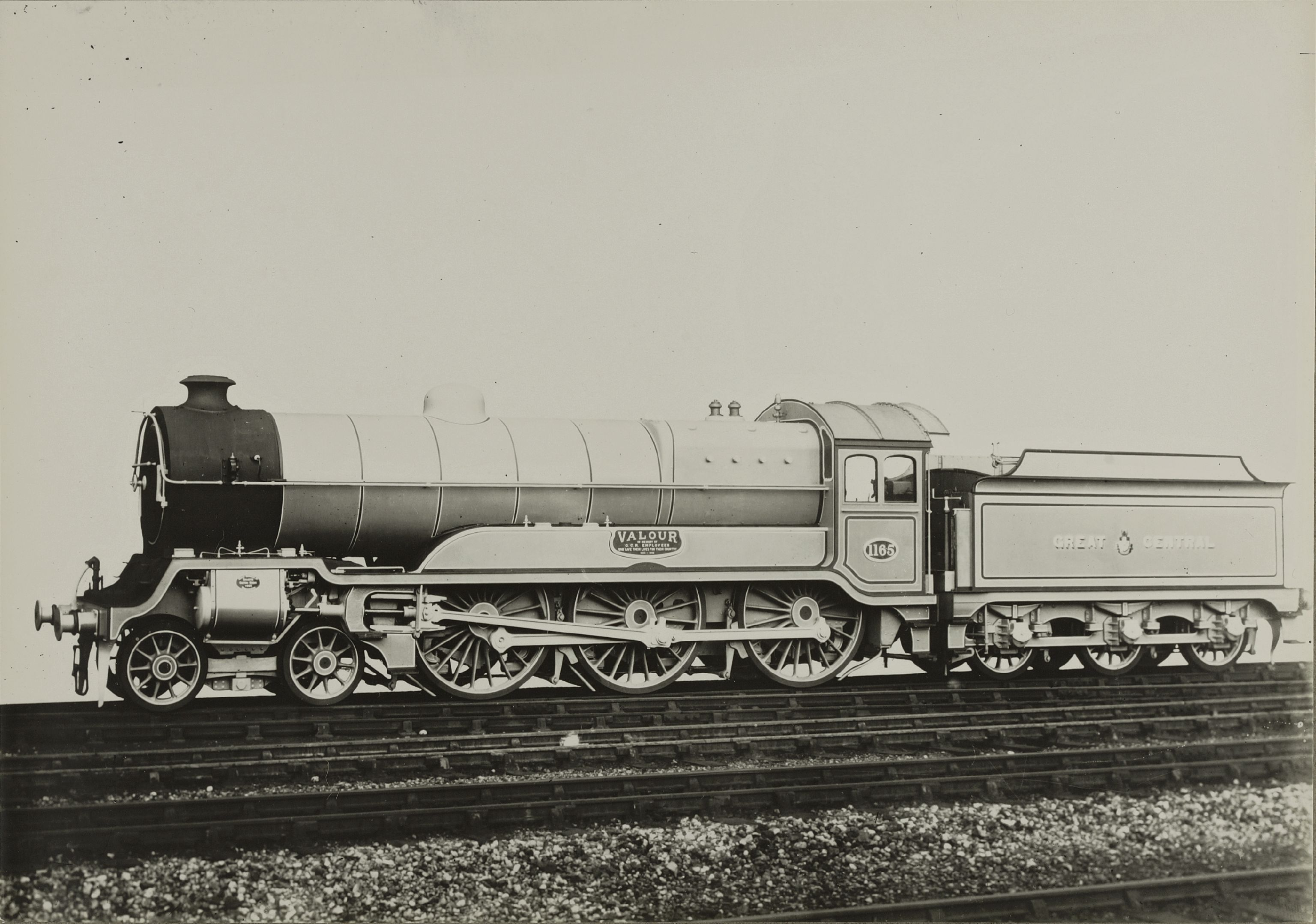
Type and origin
- Power type: Steam
- Designer: John G. Robinson
- Builder: GCR, at Gorton Works
- Build date: 1917, 1920
- Total produced: 6
Specifications
- Configuration
  - Whyte: 4-6-0
  - UIC: 2'C
- Gauge: 4 ft 8 1/2 in (1,435 mm)
- Leading dia.: 3 ft 6 in (1,070 mm)
- Driver dia.: 6 ft 9 in (2,060 mm)
- Wheelbase: 52 ft 9 1/2 in (16,091 mm)
- Length: 63 ft 0 1/2 in (19,215 mm)
- Fuel type: Coal
- Boiler
  - Diameter: 5 ft 3.5 in (1,613 mm) to 5 ft 6 in (1,680 mm) outside
- Boiler pressure: 180 lbf/in^{2} (1,200 kPa; 13 kgf/cm^{2})
- Heating surface
  - Firebox: 163 sq ft (15.1 m^{2})
  - Total surface: 2,044 sq ft (189.9 m^{2})
- Superheater
  - Heating area: 343 sq ft (31.9 m^{2})
- Cylinders: Four
- Cylinder size: 16 in × 26 in (410 mm × 660 mm)
- Valve gear: Stephenson
- Valve type: 8 in (200 mm) piston valves
Performance figures
- Tractive effort: 25,145 lbf (111.85 kN)
Career
- Operators: Great Central Railway; London and North Eastern Railway; British Railways
- Number in class: 6
- Numbers: GCR 1164–9; LNER 6164–9 (later 1494–8); BR 61497
- Nicknames: Lord Faringdon
- Withdrawn: 1946–49
- Disposition: All scrapped

GCR Class 9P was a design of four-cylinder steam locomotive of the 4-6-0 wheel arrangement built for hauling express passenger trains on the Great Central Railway in England. A total of six were built: one in 1917, and five in 1920. They were sometimes known as the Lord Faringdon class, from the name of the first one built.

== History ==
John G. Robinson served as Chief Mechanical Engineer of the Great Central Railway (GCR) from 1900 to 1922. Towards the end of his period of office, he introduced two classes of 4-6-0 locomotive with four cylinders and large-diameter boilers. They differed primarily in the diameter of their driving wheels: the first design, Class 9P (LNER Class B3 from September 1923), had 6-foot-9-inch (2.06 m) diameter wheels, for express passenger service; and the second, Class 9Q (LNER Class B7), had 5-foot-8-inch (1.73 m) wheels, for mixed-traffic work.

The first locomotive of Class 9P to be built was costed at £5,871. The four cylinders had a bore of 16 inches (410 mm) and a stroke of 26 inches (660 mm). They were set in line (like the LNWR Claughton Class), with the inside cylinders driving the front coupled axle, and the outside cylinders driving the middle coupled axle (like the GWR Star Class). The 8 inches (200 mm) piston valves were actuated by two sets of Stephenson valve gear, mounted inside the frames and operating the valves of the outside cylinders through rocking shafts placed behind the cylinders. These rocking shafts caused the two valves on each side to move forwards and backwards together, and since the inside and outside cylinders on each side were out of phase by 180°, the valves of the outside cylinders were arranged for outside admission, instead of the normal inside admission layout. The boiler was the Gorton "No. 7 Standard", which was already used on two other GCR 4-6-0 classes: Class 1 (LNER Class B2) and Class 1A (LNER Class B8); it would later be used on Class 9Q as well. In July 1928, this boiler was assigned to LNER Diagram 13.

=== Class B3/2 ===
The complicated cylinder castings, which involved tortuous narrow steam passages to provide inside admission for the inside cylinders and outside admission for the outside cylinders, resulted in poor steam flow; this, together with leakages around the piston valves, led to a high coal consumption which became particularly apparent once the locomotives were being used on trains out of King's Cross. Nigel Gresley, the Chief Mechanical Engineer of the LNER, decided to fit poppet valves, but instead of operating these by Lentz valve gear, as he had done with some of his other poppet valve fitments (such as Class B12), Gresley chose to use Caprotti valve gear. This was driven from the driving axle by a longitudinal shaft along the centre of the locomotive to a transverse shaft above the cylinders. No. 6168 Lord Stuart of Wortley was modified in September 1929, followed by no. 6166 in December. In December 1929, class B3 was subdivided into two parts, and the locomotives modified with Caprotti valve gear were given the classification B3/2, and the unmodified locomotives became B3/1. On test, they showed a 16% reduction in coal consumption, and as a result, a further two more were modified to B3/2 – no. 6167 in June 1938, and no. 6164 Earl Beatty in June 1939. These used steam to close the valves, instead of the springs fitted to nos. 6166/8. It was intended to convert the remaining two Class B3/1 locomotives, but the outbreak of war meant that they were never modified, and retained Stephenson valve gear until withdrawal.

=== Class B3/3 ===
In 1943, no. 6166 Earl Haig of Class B3/2 was found to have cracked cylinders, and was selected by Edward Thompson for rebuilding with two outside cylinders, ten-inch piston valves actuated by Walschaerts valve gear and a round-top boiler of the same design (known as Diagram 100A) as was used on his Class B1 4-6-0. The wheels, bogie and rear part of the main frames were retained, as was the tender, but all the other components were new. It was reclassified B3/3, and returned to service in October 1943, retaining its number but losing its name, since there was no suitable place to affix the nameplates. No further rebuilds followed; the reconstruction weakened the frames, and although this locomotive was the sole member of the class to be inherited by British Railways, it survived only until 1949.

== Numbers and names ==
Number	Built	Name	Rebuilt	Final LNER number	Withdrawn
1169	November 1917	Lord Faringdon		1494	December 1947
1164	June 1920	Earl Beatty	June 1939 (B3/2)	1495	September 1947
1165	July 1920	Valour		1496	December 1947
1166	August 1920	Earl Haig	December 1929 (B3/2); October 1943 (B3/3)	1497	April 1949
1167	September 1920	Lloyd George	June 1938 (B3/2)	1498	December 1947
1168	October 1920	Lord Stuart of Wortley	September 1929 (B3/2)	1499 (not carried)	September 1946

No. 1169 was named after the GCR Chairman (Class 11E locomotive no. 429 giving up its name Sir Alexander Henderson at this time – he had been raised to the peerage the previous year), and no. 1168 after another GCR Director. Nos. 1164, 1166 and 1167 were named after significant British leaders of the First World War: Beatty was an Admiral in the Royal Navy; Haig was a Field-Marshal in the Army; and Lloyd George was Prime Minister. The remaining engine, no. 1165, was designated as the war memorial locomotive: it carried an inscription below the name reading "In memory of G.C.R. employees who gave their lives for their country 1914–1918"; and on Armistice Day each year until the outbreak of the Second World War, it was decorated with poppies and hauled a train from Manchester London Road to Sheffield Victoria, carrying a party of railwaymen to a memorial service. The name was removed from no. 1167 on 30 August 1923, on the instructions of Sir Frederick Banbury; and from LNER no. 6166 (formerly no. 1166) in October 1943. One nameplate of LNER no. 1496 (formerly GCR no. 1165) has been preserved at the National Railway Museum. After withdrawal, the name from LNER no. 1494 (formerly GCR no. 1169) was transferred in March 1948 to LNER Class A4 4-6-2 no. 34, which was given its British Railways number 60034 at the same time.

After the Grouping, the LNER increased the GCR numbers by 5000, this occurring in 1924–25. Under the 1946 renumbering, they were allotted 1480–5 in order of construction, but these were not applied, being amended later that year to 1494–9. No. 6168 was withdrawn before the number 1499 could be applied, but the others were renumbered in September and October 1946. No. 1497, the sole Class B3/3 rebuild, was the only one to survive nationalisation; it was duly allotted no. 61497, which was applied in April 1948.
