= GCR Class 11B =

Class of British steam locomotives

Great Central Railway Class 11B
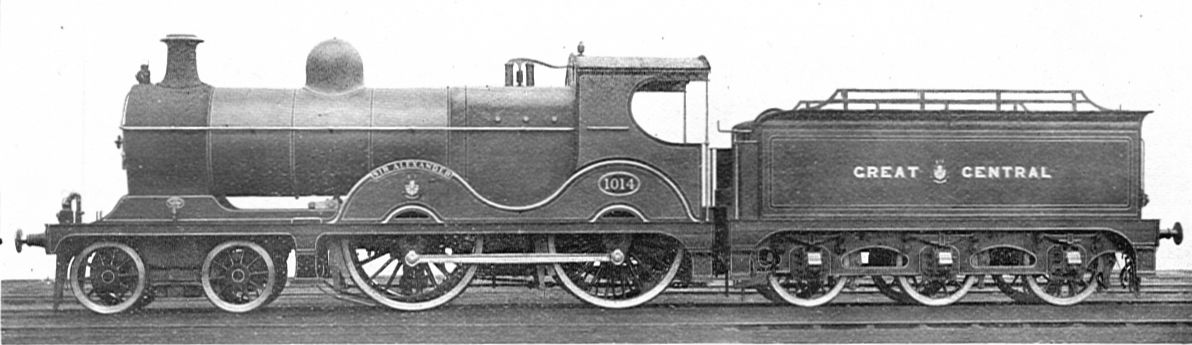
- 1014 Sir Alexander
Type and origin
- Power type: Steam
- Designer: John G. Robinson
- Builder: Sharp, Stewart and Company (30); Vulcan Foundry (10)
- Build date: 1901-02 (30), 1904 (10)
- Total produced: 40
Specifications
- Configuration
  - Whyte: 4-4-0
  - UIC: 2'Bn2, later 2'Bh2
- Gauge: 4 ft 8 1/2 in (1,435 mm)
- Leading dia.: 3 ft 6 in (1.067 m)
- Driver dia.: 6 ft 9 in (2.057 m)
- Length: 56 ft 5.5 in (17.209 m)
- Loco weight: 55.7 long tons (56.6 t)
- Firebox
  - Grate area: 21.17 sq ft (1.967 m^{2})
- Boiler
  - Diameter: 4 ft 9.5 in (1,460 mm) to 5 ft (1,500 mm)
- Boiler pressure: 180 psi (1.24 MPa)
- Heating surface: 1,260 sq ft (117 m^{2})
- Superheater
  - Heating area: 22 elements, 178 sq ft (16.5 m^{2})
- Cylinders: Two, inside
- Cylinder size: 18.5 in (470 mm) bore 26 in (660 mm) stroke
- Valve gear: Stephenson
- Valve type: Slide valves
Performance figures
- Tractive effort: 17,385 lbf (77.33 kN)
Career
- Operators: Great Central Railway; → London and North Eastern Railway
- Class: GCR: 11B; LNER: D9
- Numbers: GCR: 1013-1042, 104–113; LNER: 6013–6042, 5104-5113
- Nicknames: "Pom-Pom Bogies"
- Withdrawn: 1913–1927
- Disposition: Rebuilt to GCR class 11D

The Great Central Railway Class 11B was a class of 40 4-4-0 express passenger locomotives, designed John G. Robinson. Built from 1901 to 1903, in later rebuilt form as 11D, some 11Bs would last in service until 1950. Railwaymen continued to refer to the class as "11B", even after all were rebuilt to 11D. Being contemporary with and to some extent the 4-4-0 version of Robinson's much more numerous 0-6-0 goods class 9J, which were known as "Pom-Poms", the 11Bs acquired the nickname "Pom-Pom Bogies". The London & North Eastern Railway classified the 11Bs, along with their 11C and 11D rebuilds, as Class D9.

== Origins ==
When John G. Robinson took up the reins at Gorton there was a serious and immediate shortage of suitable locomotives. Part of the requirement was for express passenger engines for the newly completed London Extension. Pollitt's locomotives of class 11 were performing satisfactorily but the piston-valved 11A 4-4-0s, intended for use on Marylebone expresses had been problematic. There were also some previously ordered 4-2-2 'singles' being delivered, but Robinson decided that more powerful locomotives were required.

The 11Bs therefore emerged as a robust and substantially enlarged evolution of GCR Class 11, with the then-conventional slide valves. Gorton was busy at the time and the engines were needed urgently, so outside builders (Sharp, Stewart and Vulcan Foundry) were used. Delivery was rapid and 25 were in service by May 1902, 30 by March 1903 and all 40 by June 1904.

== Service history ==
As intended the 11Bs displaced Pollitt's 11As on the London Extension services, with engines shedded at Leicester, Gorton and Neasden.

The 11Bs were partially displaced in their turn by the arrival of Robinson's "Atlantics", a process largely completed by the arrival of the "Director" 4-4-0s. 11Bs then found uses on the older parts of the Great Central Railway network, based especially in Sheffield and Annesley, with others scattered elsewhere.

By the Grouping, increasing numbers of the engines had been rebuilt with larger superheated boilers and piston valves becoming GCR Class 11D. The last conversion was completed in 1927.

== Accidents and incidents ==
On 23 December 1904, locomotive No. 1040 was hauling an express passenger train which was derailed at Aylesbury, Buckinghamshire due to excessive speed on a curve. Four people were killed.

== Performance ==
The performance of these engines was very much overshadowed by later Robinson engines such as classes 8B, 11E, and 11F. Nevertheless, they must have been at least reasonably satisfactory from the start to merit the additional order of 10 in 1904. Hancox records them as reliable and capable of working nine bogie coaches. London Extension schedules from 1905, at which time the 11Bs were still working some of the best trains, needed average speeds of nearly 60 mph (97 km/h) and to keep these times much faster running must have been required. Even with relatively light loads this implies at the least a free-running locomotive. Their long lives (especially in later rebuilt form) suggest robust and trouble-free construction.

However effective they were, Robinson clearly identified a need for larger express passenger locomotives, with the 8B "Jersey Lilies" appearing in 1903, very soon after the 11Bs were delivered. There were also three distinct attempts to improve the 11Bs through rebuilding, creating 11C and eventually 11D (see below).

== Naming ==
Four of the class were given names, although strictly speaking only one - 1014 - carried a name when still class 11B:

Year Named	Loco Number	Name	Named After	Notes
1902	1014	Sir Alexander	Sir Alexander Henderson, then newly created Baronet, director of the GCR	Name removed in 1913 on further ennoblement of Sir Alexander, who then became an 11E.
1907	104	Queen Alexandra	Queen Alexandra, consort of King Edward VII	Named on rebuilding to 11C
1911	110	King George V	King George V, successor to King Edward VII	Rebuilt to 11C prior to receiving its name
1913	1021	Queen Mary	Queen Mary, queen consort of King George V	Named in the course of rebuilding as the pioneer 11D.

The nature of these titles demonstrates the high status that the engines enjoyed at the time they were named.

== Modifications ==
=== Class 11B ===
As built, all 40 had cylinders incorporating slide valves; they also had boilers of 4 feet 9 inches (1.45 m) diameter, with fireboxes 7 feet 0 inches (2.13 m) long; they operated using saturated steam (i.e. the boilers did not have superheaters). These locomotives formed GCR Class 11B. The 11Bs were little changed from introduction until rebuilding as the superheated 11D starting with No. 1021 in 1913, except for two prior attempts to upgrade the class. The first was fitting of larger saturated boilers and modified pistons to Nos. 104 and 110 creating GCR Class 11C in 1907, apparently without significant success.

=== Class 11C ===
Two locomotives, nos. 104 and 110, were rebuilt in 1907 with larger boilers: these were 5 feet 0 inches (1.52 m) diameter, with fireboxes 8 feet 6 inches (2.59 m) long; again, they were saturated, and these rebuilds were reclassified 11C. No. 110 lost its large boiler in August 1918, receiving a normal 11B boiler in replacement. The large boiler which had been removed was then fitted to no. 113 in October 1918, which was also given piston valves at the same time. Nos. 104 & 113 were rebuilt to class 11D in 1923.

=== Class 11D ===
In 1909, no. 1026 was given a boiler of the same diameter as the 11C rebuilds, but with the same firebox length as the 11B class. It also received new cylinders, incorporating piston valves. This boiler was saturated, but from 1913 further boilers of this size, which incorporated superheaters, were fitted to the 11B class, each of which was then reclassified 11D. No. 1026 was so rebuilt in 1914, its previous boiler then being transferred to no. 105; it was removed again in 1916 when no. 105 received a normal 11B boiler. All the rebuilds were given piston valves at the same time as the large boilers, apart from five locomotives (1027/31/42, 112/3), which had already received piston valves anything from two to six years beforehand; and no. 105, which retained slide valves when first given a large boiler, receiving piston valves when fitted with a superheated boiler in 1923. The process of rebuilding to class 11D was completed in January 1927, by which time the GCR had become part of the LNER, which placed all 40 in class D9.

The first D9 was withdrawn by the LNER in 1939 and 26 remained in service on nationalization of the railways in 1948, mainly in operation on the ex Cheshire Lines Committee routes. The last example was retired from service in 1950.

== Models ==
In 1904 Bassett-Lowke produced a Gauge 1 model of an 11B, complete with appropriate coaches, in association with a Great Central Railway marketing initiative. The engine represented was No. 1014 'Sir Alexander'.
