= GCR Class 9K =

Classes of British 4-4-2T steam locomotives

Great Central Railway 9K class London & North Eastern Railway C13
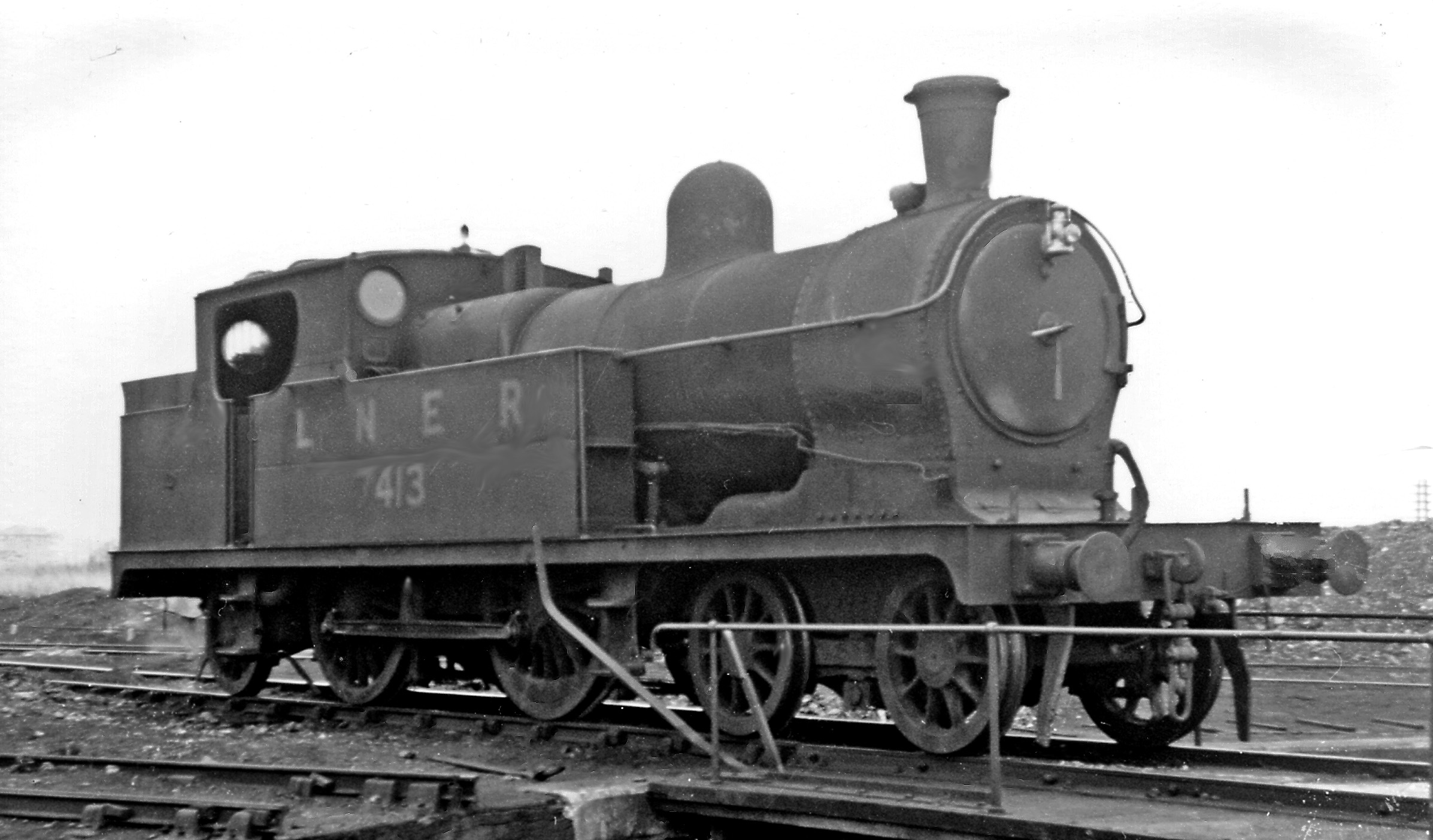
- LNER 7413 at Chester Northgate locomotive depot in 1947
Type and origin
- Power type: Steam
- Designer: John G. Robinson
- Build date: 1903–1905
- Total produced: 40 (9K / C13); 12 (9L / C14)
Specifications
- Configuration
  - Whyte: 4-4-2T
  - UIC: 2′B1′ n2t, later 2′B1′ h2t
- Gauge: 4 ft 8 1/2 in (1,435 mm)
- Leading dia.: 3 ft 6 in (1.067 m)
- Driver dia.: 5 ft 7 in (1.702 m)
- Trailing dia.: 3 ft 9 in (1.143 m)
- Wheelbase: 29 ft 10.5 in (9.106 m)
- Loco weight: 66.65 long tons (67.72 t)
- Fuel type: Coal
- Fuel capacity: 3.65 long tons (3.71 t)
- Water cap.: 1,450 imperial gallons (6,600 L; 1,740 US gal)
- Firebox
  - Grate area: 19.59 sq ft (1.820 m^{2})
- Boiler pressure: 160 psi (1.10 MPa)
- Heating surface
  - Firebox: 108 sq ft (10.0 m^{2})
  - Tubes: 1,778 sq ft (165.2 m^{2})
  - Total surface: 1,101 sq ft (102.3 m^{2}) (saturated)
- Cylinders: Two, inside
- Cylinder size: 18 in × 26 in (457 mm × 660 mm)
- Valve gear: Stephenson
- Valve type: Slide valves
Performance figures
- Tractive effort: 17,100 lbf (76 kN)
Career
- Operators: Great Central Railway; → London and North Eastern Railway; → British Railways
- Class: GCR: 9K; LNER: C13
- Number in class: 40
- Numbers: GCR: LNER: later 7400-7439; BR: 67400-67439
- Withdrawn: 1952–1960
- Disposition: All scrapped

The Great Central Railway 9K and 9L classes were two related classes of 4-4-2T Atlantic steam locomotives. They were both intended for suburban passenger services. After the 1923 Grouping, they served the LNER as classes C13 and C14.

Their designer was John G. Robinson. The design was based on the earlier Pollitt Class 9G 2-4-2T locomotives, but with a lengthened boiler and a leading bogie to carry it. This extension of running gear also resembled an early Robinson design for the Irish Waterford, Limerick and Western Railway.

All passed into British Railways service and the first was not withdrawn until 1952. Most were withdrawn between 1955 and 1959. The last examples of each class, 9K 67417 and 9L 67450, were scrapped in 1960. None were preserved.

== GCR 9K / LNER C13 ==
Forty locomotives were built to the 9K class, in four batches between 1903 and 1905.

The GCR installed water troughs around the same time as this class was built. They were fitted with water scoops, but these were little used by the 1930s and so were removed.

In 1933, six locomotives were fitted for push-pull working, according to the GCR mechanical system. These were converted to the LNER vacuum system and in 1941, two others were converted.

=== Superheating ===
Superheated
Specifications
- Firebox
  - Grate area: 19.59 sq ft (1.820 m^{2})
- Boiler pressure: 160 psi (1.10 MPa)
- Heating surface
  - Firebox: 108 sq ft (10.0 m^{2})
  - Tubes: 503 sq ft (46.7 m^{2}) (tubes) 282 sq ft (26.2 m^{2}) (flues)
  - Total surface: 1,031 sq ft (95.8 m^{2}) (superheated)
- Superheater
  - Heating area: 138 sq ft (12.8 m^{2})

One example, No. 18 was experimentally superheated in 1915. From 1926 to 1935 the entire class was superheated. During this time, the original saturated locomotives were classified as C13/1 and the superheated rebuilds as C13/2. Some locomotives were rebuilt further as C13/3, with shortened chimneys and domes to fit within the LNER loading gauge. (Note: The GCR was known for its unusually large loading gauge, by British standards at least.) By 1938, all locomotives had been rebuilt to the C13/3 standard and so the distinguishing sub-classes were abandoned.

=== Service ===
The 9K class was built for the London suburban services, running from the GCR's Marylebone terminus.

Within a few years, the timing of these suburban trains was facing competition from electric services. Competing with these required faster acceleration and the more powerful 4-6-2T Class 9N was introduced.

From 1922 they were dispersed away from London through the GCR network, to South Yorkshire between Manchester, Sheffield and Mexborough. Most notably, many of them went to Wrexham where they were based successfully until the 1950s. The South Yorkshire engines gradually moved to Gorton locomotive shed, from where they were used on Manchester suburban services, and destinations as far as Hayfield and Macclesfield, later joined by the 9Ls, until they were both replaced by DMUs after post-1955 dieselisation.

All passed into British Railways service and survived until at least 1952. but were withdrawn between 1955 and 1959. The last No 67417 was scrapped in 1960. None were preserved.

The class was successful throughout its working life and is considered to be one of Robinson's best designs.

== GCR 9L / LNER C14 ==
Great Central Railway 9L class London & North Eastern Railway C14
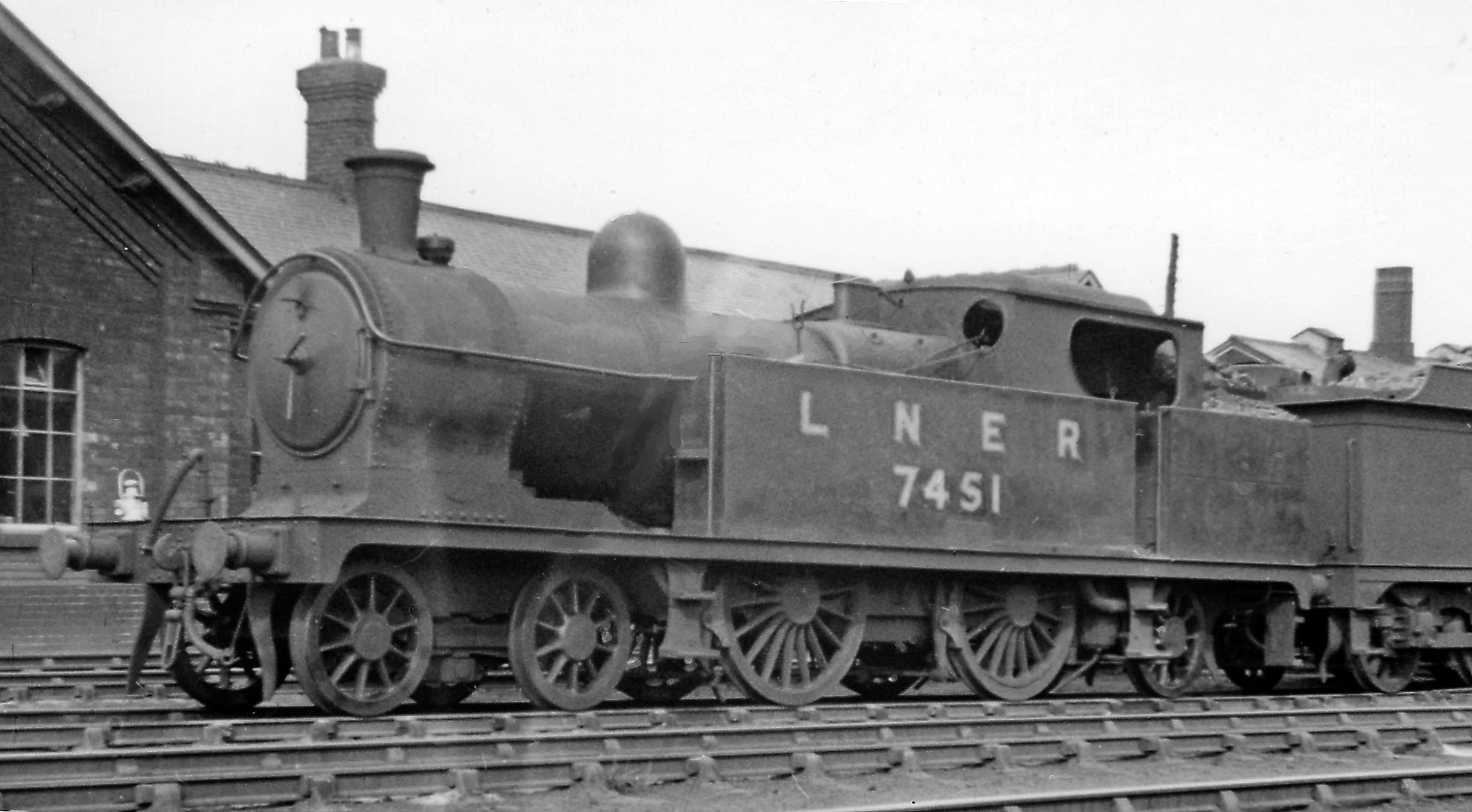
- LNER 7451 at Ardsley locomotive depot in 1947
Specifications
- Loco weight: 71 long tons (72 t)
- Fuel capacity: 4.3 long tons (4.4 t)
- Water cap.: 1,825 imperial gallons (8,300 L; 2,192 US gal)
Career
- Class: GCR: 9L; LNER: C14
- Number in class: 12
- Numbers: LNER: 7440–7451; BR: 67440–67451
- Withdrawn: 1957–1960
- Disposition: All scrapped

A further twelve locomotives were built by Beyer, Peacock & Co. in 1907. These were of basically the same design, but had enlarged water and coal capacity. They were designated 9L by the GCR and later C14 by the LNER.

The side tanks were enlarged for an extra 375 gallons, by widening their side plates. Overall width across the tanks increased from 8' 6" to 8' 9". This gives rise to a visible recognition feature in photographs: the 9K have tank and cab sides in a flat plane, the 9L tank sides project slightly.

Coal capacity was also increased by raising the rear wall of the bunker with a semicircular extension.

The boilers were the same as for the 9K. All were built with saturated boilers and, as for the 9Ks, were rebuilt with superheating as their boilers were replaced. The first to be superheated was Nº 1122 in 1914, although this was not a new boiler and only lasted until 1923 when it was replaced by a saturated boiler. All were converted under LNER ownership, from 1926 to 1935. Water pick-up gear and shortened chimneys to fit the LNER loading gauge were removed and changed as for the 9K class.

=== Service ===
The 9L class was built for the London suburban services from Marylebone and they were based at Neasden shed.

With the introduction of the Class 9Ns, the 9Ls were moved to stopping services on the Great Central Main Line and by 1922 they were based around Nottingham, with one of the twelve stabled at Woodford and some occasional allocations to Hitchin and Hatfield.

From 1934, they were dispersed, some to East Anglia and others to the West Riding and Manchester. After Nationalisation, they were once again working suburban passenger services with the 9Ks, out of Manchester.

Nearly all were scrapped in 1957, following the introduction of DMUs for the suburban services. The last Nº 67450 survived until 1960. None were preserved.

== Accidents and incidents ==
- On 8 June 1939, locomotive No. 5020 was hauling a passenger train which departed from Manchester Central station, Lancashire against a danger signal. It was in collision with another passenger train and was derailed. Several people were injured.
