= War memorial locomotive =

A war memorial locomotive is a locomotive dedicated as a war memorial and usually given an appropriate name. The following examples come from Britain and the First World War:

- London and North Western Railway - LNWR Claughton Class No. 1914 Patriot. Name later removed and used on LMS Patriot Class No. (4)5500.
- London, Brighton and South Coast Railway – LB&SCR L class No. 333 Remembrance.
- Great Central Railway – GCR Class 9P (LNER Class B3) 4-6-0 No. 1165 (later LNER Nos 6165, 1496) Valour. Name now carried by GB Railfreight Class 66 diesel locomotive 66715 Valour.
