= GCR Class 8B =

Class of 27 British 4-4-2 locomotives

GCR Class 8B LNER Class C4
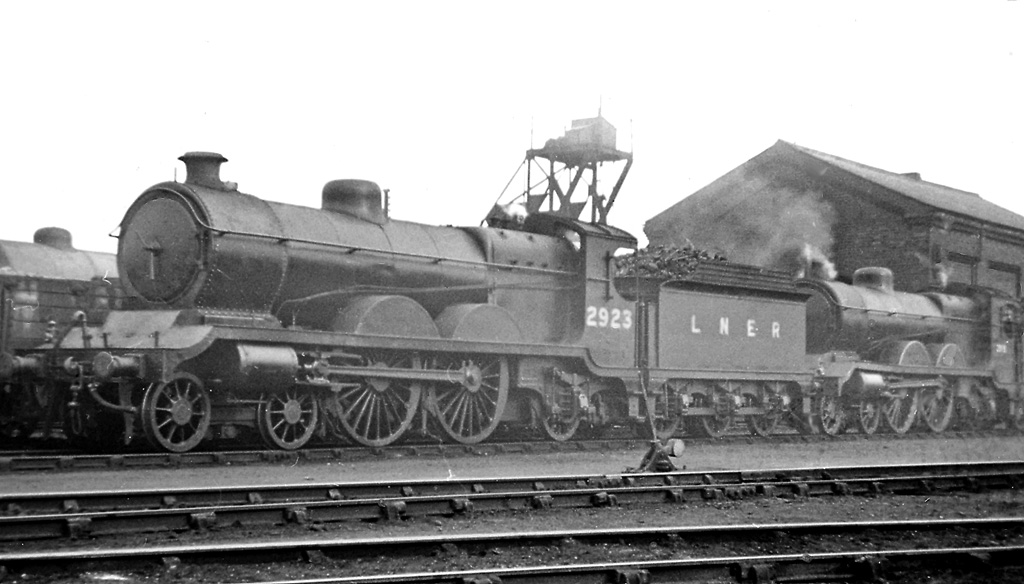
- Two LNER Class C4 (ex GCR Class 8B) on Retford shed in April 1947
Type and origin
- Power type: Steam
- Designer: John G. Robinson
- Builder: Beyer, Peacock & Co. (7); North British Locomotive Company (12); Gorton Works (8)
- Build date: 1903-1906
- Total produced: 27
Specifications
- Configuration
  - Whyte: 4-4-2
  - UIC: 2′B1′ n2 (later 2′B1′ h2)
- Gauge: 4 ft 8 1/2 in (1,435 mm)
- Leading dia.: 3 ft 6 in (1.067 m)
- Driver dia.: 6 ft 9 in (2.057 m)
- Trailing dia.: 4 ft 3 in (1.295 m)
- Wheelbase: 51 ft 10 in (15.8 m)
  - Engine: 27 ft 9.5 in (8.471 m)
  - Tender: 13 ft (4.0 m)
- Height: 13 ft 5 in (4.09 m) (later 13 ft 0.5 in (3.98 m))
- Axle load: 18.5 long tons (18.8 t)
- Loco weight: 71.9 long tons (73.1 t)
- Tender weight: 48.3 long tons (49.1 t)
- Total weight: 120.2 long tons (122.1 t)
- Fuel type: Coal
- Fuel capacity: 6 long tons 0 cwt (13,400 lb or 6.1 t)
- Water cap.: 4,000 imp gal (18,000 L; 4,800 US gal)
- Firebox
  - Type: Belpaire
  - Grate area: 26.24 sq ft (2.44 m^{2})
- Boiler
  - Model: 5 ft 0 in (1.5 m)
  - Type: LNER Diagram 15
  - Tube plates: 15 ft (4,600 mm)
- Boiler pressure: 180 psi (1.24 MPa)
- Heating surface
  - Firebox: 154 sq ft (14.3 m^{2})
  - Tubes: 885 sq ft (82.2 m^{2})
  - Flues: 464 sq ft (43.1 m^{2})
  - Total surface: 1,745 sq ft (162.1 m^{2})
- Superheater
  - Heating area: 242 sq ft (22.5 m^{2})
- Cylinders: Two, outside
- Cylinder size: 19 in × 26 in (483 mm × 660 mm) (original engines); 20 in × 26 in (508 mm × 660 mm) (first rebuild); 21 in × 26 in (533 mm × 660 mm) (second rebuild)
- Valve gear: Stephenson valve gear
- Valve type: Slide (originally); Piston (later refits)
Performance figures
- Tractive effort: C4/2: 17,729 lbf (78.9 kN) @ 85% boiler pressure (later 19,644 lbf (87.4 kN)); C4/4: 21,658 lbf (96.3 kN) @ 85% boiler pressure
Career
- Operators: Great Central Railway; → London & North Eastern Railway; → British Railways
- Power class: BR: 2P
- Numbers: GCR: 192, 194, 263–267, 1083–1094, 260–262, 358, 360–363
- Nicknames: Jersey Lillies
- Withdrawn: 1939–1950
- Disposition: All scrapped

The GCR Class 8B was a class of 27 two-cylinder steam locomotives of the 4-4-2 wheel arrangement built between 1903 and 1906 for the Great Central Railway. They were nicknamed "Jersey Lillies" after the famous music star Lillie Langtry.

== GCR era ==
Facing a potential rise in passenger traffic, the Great Central Railway placed an order for two pairs of different locomotives from the North British Locomotive Company of Glasgow in 1903 - one pair being the 4-6-0 GCR Class 8C, the other pair being this 4-4-2 locomotive. The two locomotives shared as many common components as possible to allow easy conversion of the 8Bs to the 4-6-0 configuration - and both designs borrowed heavily from John G. Robinson's earlier GCR Class 8.

However, due to a much smaller than anticipated traffic increase, no further Class 8Cs were built, and instead a further 25 Class 8Bs were ordered and built between 1904 and 1906 - built with larger fireboxes as there was no longer a need to convert the locomotives to a 4-6-0 configuration. In 1909 and 1910, the original locomotives also received this larger firebox.

Despite Robinson commencing the conversion to superheaters in 1912, the conversion was not actually completed until 1936. At the same time, any locomotive requiring cylinder replacement saw both larger cylinders and piston valves being fitted - 20 of the class would eventually receive this modification. From 1921, the Ramsbottom safety valves were phased out and removed, to be replaced by Ross pop safety valves. Another modification was the fitting of ash ejectors. However, these were removed in the 1930s.

== Experimental locomotive ==
Following a high-speed incident that caused severe damage to its frame and cylinders, No. 1090 was rebuilt with 3 simple expansion cylinders in 1908, as a comparison to the GCR Classes 8D and 8E. These cylinders had their Stephenson valve gear replaced with Walschaerts valve gear, which was the only application of this valve gear, excluding railcars, on a GCR locomotive. Instead of all three cylinders being fitted with Walschaerts on one axle, the two outside cylinders drove the second axle, and the inside cylinder drove the first axle. The experiment was reverted in 1922 when No. 1090 was rebuilt, with the original 2 cylinders and Stephenson valve gear being refitted.

== Post-merger ==
Following the merger of the GCR into the London & North Eastern Railway, the class became known as the LNER Class C4. In 1925, several C4s were fitted with the LNER's trademark "Flowerpot" chimney, with one locomotive, No. 6085, also modified to fit the LNER composite gauge - a modification that the remainder of the class underwent between 1936 and 1939. In 1929, a further LNER classification change was made - the non-superheated locomotives were designated Class C4/1, those fitted with superheaters but still utilized slide valves Class C4/2, and those with both superheaters and piston valves became Class C4/3. By 1932, the re-gauged No. 6085 had been given the designation Class C4/4 - which became more populated as Class C4/3s were cut down. By 1939, all Class C4/1s and Class C4/3s had been redesignated as either Class C4/2s or Class C4/4s - by this time all locomotives were both superheated and had also been cut down to the LNER composite gauge.

== LNER era and decline ==
During the 1930s, the C4s were struggling with an increase in passenger traffic. Replaced by the LNER B17/4s, some of the class moved away from the Great Central Main Line to the Great Eastern Main Line and to former GNR lines, where they hauled stopping passenger trains and secondary duties.

== Withdrawal ==
Following an accident at Banbury in 1939, the first locomotive, No. 6090 (the same engine as No. 1090, which had already been modified after a previous accident), was withdrawn from service. Two more members were withdrawn during World War II, these being Nos. 5266 and 6087 in October 1943 and November 1944 respectively. The rest of the class began being withdrawn from 1947, although 20 locomotives made it into British Railways hands following the nationalisation of the British railways. However, none received their BR numbers. The last locomotive, No. 2918, was withdrawn from Lincoln (Shed 40A) on 2 December 1950, and none survived into preservation.
