= John G. Robinson =

English railway engineer

John George Robinson CBE, (30 July 1856 – 7 December 1943) was an English railway engineer, and was chief mechanical engineer of the Great Central Railway from 1900 to 1922.

== Early life ==
Born at Newcastle upon Tyne, the second son of Matthew Robinson, a locomotive engineer, and his wife Jane, Robinson was educated at the Chester Grammar School, and in 1872 commenced an engineering apprenticeship with the Great Western Railway at Swindon Works, as a pupil of Joseph Armstrong. In 1878 he became assistant to his father Matthew Robinson at Bristol, and in 1884 joined the Waterford and Limerick Railway (which became the Waterford, Limerick and Western Railway in 1896) as their locomotive, carriage and wagon assistant superintendent. He was promoted to superintendent the following year.

== Great Central Railway ==
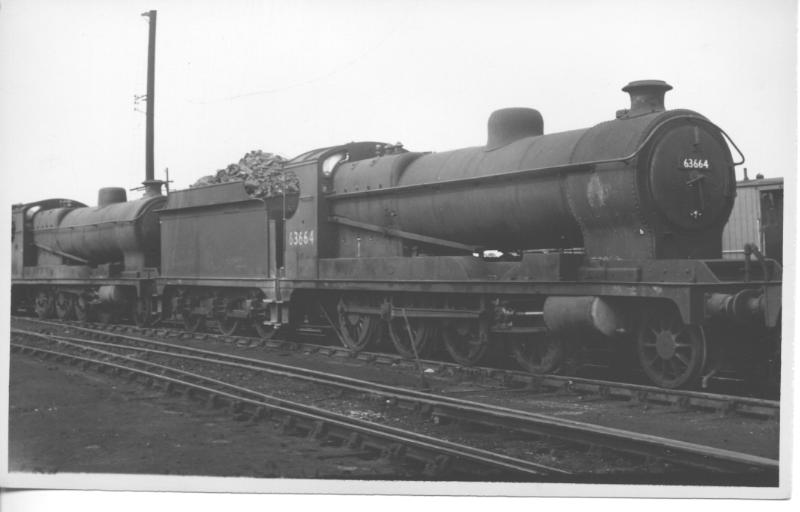
A Robinson-designed GCR Class 8K 2-8-0 heavy freight locomotive, built in 1912, in service at Langwith Junction shed on 7 August 1960

In 1900 Robinson joined the Great Central Railway as locomotive and marine superintendent and in 1902 was appointed chief mechanical engineer. He remained in that post until 1922, when prior to the Great Central's grouping into the London and North Eastern Railway he declined the post of chief mechanical engineer of the LNER, choosing instead to step aside for the younger Nigel Gresley. Robinson was awarded a CBE in 1920.

Robinson's first passenger locomotive design for the GCR was Class 11B (LNER Class D9) 4-4-0, of which 40 were built between 1901 and 1904, the last being withdrawn by British Railways in 1950. Robinson followed in 1913 with the larger Class 11E (LNER D10) "Director" Class 4-4-0 locomotive, which was used on GCR express trains from London Marylebone to Sheffield Victoria and Manchester London Road. Ten were built, followed by eleven "Improved Director" (GCR Class 11F, LNER Class D11) locomotives during 1920–1924.

Robinson's famous GCR Class 8K 2-8-0 heavy freight locomotive was introduced in 1911 and many more were built for the Railway Operating Division of the Royal Engineers in 1917. Some of these reliable locomotives, of which over 400 were built, remained in service with the LNER and later British Railways until 1966.

== Locomotive classes credited to Robinson ==
=== Waterford and Limerick Railway ===
Year	Type	Nos.	GSWR Class	GSWR Nos.	GSR Class	Inchicore Class	Withdrawn	Notes
1888–93	0-6-0	WLR 5 to 7	224	224 to 226	—	—	1905–1909	
1889–94	2-4-0	WLR 10, 22, 20, 23, 43, 44, 47, and 48	276	263, 275, 273, 276, 290 to 293	276	G3	1907–1959	
1891	2-4-2T	WLR 13 and 14	266	226 and 227	267; 491	F4; F5	1933–1935	226 sold to CMDR 6 in 1913; to GSR 491 in 1925
1892	0-4-2T	WLR 3	260	260	—	—	1912	
1893	0-6-0	WLR 45, 46, 49, and 50	233	233 to 236	235	J22	1911–1951	
1894	0-4-4T	WLR 15	268	268	—	—	1912	
1895	0-4-4T	WLR 51 and 52	294	294 and 295	295	E2	1910–1954	
1896–97	4-4-2T	WLWR 16 to 18, and 21	269	269 to 271, 274	269	C5	1949–1957	
1896–97	4-4-0	WLWR 53 to 55	296	296 to 298	296	D15	1928–1949	
1897	0-6-0	WLWR 56 to 58	237	237 to 239	222	J25	1934–1951	
1899	0-4-4T	WLWR 27	279	279	279	E1	1953	
1900	0-6-0	WLWR 2, 4, 11	222	222	222	J25	1929–1950	4 and 11 sold before delivery to MGWR 141 and 142

Introduced	Wheel Arrangement	Purpose	Notes
1889	2-4-0	Express Passenger	
1891	2-4-2T	Passenger Tank	for Limerick and Tralee line, 2 in class
1895	0-4-4T	Tank Engine	for Limerick, Ennis and Tuam Line, 2 in class
1896	4-4-2T	Tank Engine	4 in class
1896	4-4-0	Express Passenger	for Waterford to Limerick boat trains, 3 in class
1899	0-6-0	Standard Goods Engine	8 in class

=== Great Central Railway ===
Introduced	Wheel Arrangement	GCR Class	LNER Class	Purpose	Notes
1901	0-6-0	9J	J11	Goods Engine	"Pom-poms"
1901	4-4-0	11B	D9	Express Passenger	
1902	4-6-0	8	B5	Express Goods	"Fish Engines"
1902	0-8-0	8A	Q4	Heavy Goods	"Tinies"
1903	4-4-2	8B	C4	Express Passenger	two-cylinder 'simple' "Atlantics", the "Jersey Lillies"
1903	4-6-0	8C	B1 (B18 from 1943)	Express Passenger	
1903	4-4-2T	9K	C13	Suburban Passenger	
1905-06	4-4-2	8D	C5	Express Passenger	3-cylinder 'compound' "Atlantic"
1906	4-4-2	8E	C5	Express Passenger	8D with modified frames
1906	0-6-0T	5A	J63	Dock Tank	
1906	4-6-0	8F	B4	Express Mixed Traffic	"Imminghams"
1906	4-6-0	8G	B9	Express Goods	
1907	4-4-0	11C	D9	Express Passenger	Large-boiler rebuild of two 11Bs
1907	4-4-2T	9L	C14	Suburban Passenger	
1907	0-8-4T	8H	S1	Hump Shunting Tank for Wath Yard	"Daisies"
1908	4-4-2	8J	-	Express Passenger	3-cylinder 'simple' "Atlantic" rebuilt from 8B, 'de-rebuilt' 1922
1909	4-4-0	11D	D9	Express Passenger	Large-boiler piston-valve rebuild of an 11B
1911	4-6-2T	9N	A5	Suburban Passenger Tank	"Coronation Tank"
1911	2-8-0	8K	O4	Heavy Goods	"R.O.D."
1912	4-6-0	1	B2 (B19 from 1945)	Express Passenger	"Sir Sam Fay"
1913	4-6-0	1A	B8	Express Goods	"Glenalmonds"
1913	4-4-0	11E	D10	Express Passenger	"Directors"
1914	2-6-4T	1B	L1 (L3 from 1945)	Heavy Goods Tank	
1917	4-6-0	9P	B3	Express Passenger	"Lord Faringdon" 4-cylinder
1918	2-8-0	8M	O5	Heavy Goods	large-boilered 8K
1918	4-6-0	8N	B6	Fast Mixed Traffic	
1919	4-4-0	11F	D11	Express Passenger	"Improved Director"
1921	4-6-0	9Q	B7	Fast Mixed Traffic	"Black Pig" 4-cylinder

== Preserved Robinson locomotives ==
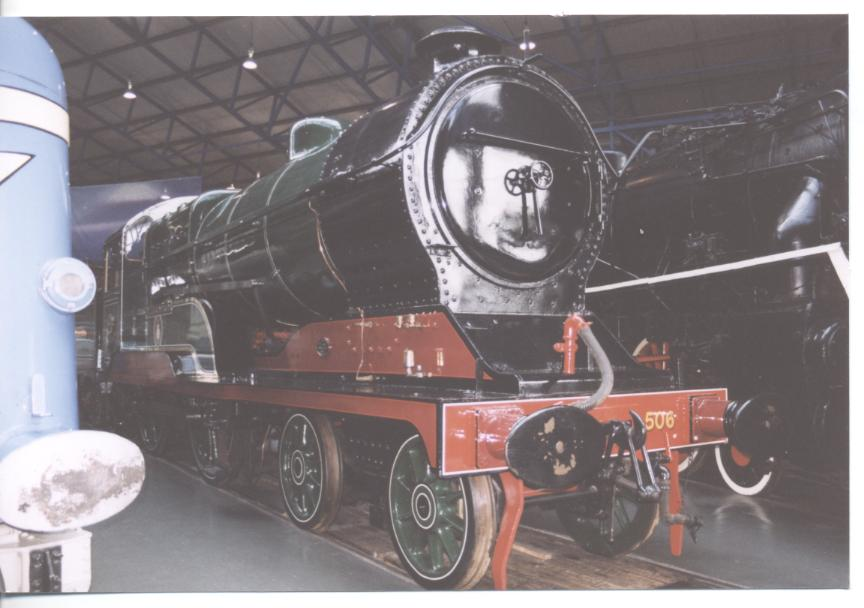
Robinson GCR Class 11F 4-4-0 No. 506 Butler–Henderson on display at the National Railway Museum, York, in 2004

Two Robinson-designed locomotives are preserved in the UK:

- 4-4-0 Improved Director GCR Class 11F No. 506 Butler–Henderson (Later BR No. 62660), which is preserved at the National Railway Museum, York, and currently on display at Barrow Hill Roundhouse, near Chesterfield, Derbyshire
- 2-8-0 GCR Class 8K No. 102 (Later BR No. 63601), also owned by the National Railway Museum is on loan to the Great Central Railway (preserved) at Loughborough. It is currently (2008) operational and used on demonstration goods trains.

Three Robinson-designed locomotives are preserved in Australia

- 2-8-0 ROD ROD 1984 (later J & A Brown No. 20) preserved by the Dorrigo Steam Railway and Museum
- 2-8-0 ROD ROD 2003 (later J & A Brown No. 24) this loco was actually built by the GCR at Gorton Works and is preserved by the Dorrigo Steam Railway and Museum
- 2-8-0 ROD ROD 2004 (later J & A Brown No. 23) this loco was actually built by the GCR at Gorton Works and is preserved by the Richmond Vale Railway Museum

== Bibliography ==
- Allen, D. W.; Boddy, M. G.; Brown, W. A.; Fry, E. V.; Hennigan, W.; Manners, F.; Neve, E.; Proud, P.; Roundthwaite, T. E.; Tee, D. F.; Yeadon, W. B. (November 1970), Fry, E. V. (ed.), Locomotives of the L.N.E.R., part 8A: Tank Engines - Classes J50 to J70, Kenilworth: RCTS, ISBN 0-901115-05-3
- Aves, W.A.T. (March–April 2000), Locomotives Illustrated 130: The Great Central 2-4-2, 4-4-2 & 0-6-2 Tank Engines, Ashford, Kent: RAS Publishing, ISSN 0307-1804
- Aves, W.A.T. (September–October 2002), Locomotives Illustrated 145: Robinson Great Central Railway Atlantics, Ashford, Kent: RAS Publishing, ISSN 0307-1804
- Boddy, M. G.; Brown, W. A.; Fry, E. V.; Hennigan, W.; Hoole, Ken; Manners, F.; Neve, E.; Platt, E. N. T.; Proud, P.; Yeadon, W. B. (March 1975), Fry, E. V. (ed.), Locomotives of the L.N.E.R., Part 2B: Tender Engines—Classes B1 to B19, Lincoln: RCTS, ISBN 0-901115-73-8
- Boddy, M. G.; Brown, W. A.; Fry, E. V.; Hennigan, W.; Hoole, Ken; Manners, F.; Neve, E.; Platt, E. N. T.; Russell, O.; Yeadon, W. B. (November 1979), Fry, E. V. (ed.), Locomotives of the L.N.E.R., Part 3A: Tender Engines—Classes C1 to C11, Kenilworth: RCTS, ISBN 0-901115-45-2
- Boddy, M. G.; Brown, W. A.; Hennigan, W.; Neve, E.; Platt, E. N. T.; Russell, O.; Yeadon, W. B. (January 1981), Fry, E. V. (ed.), Locomotives of the L.N.E.R., Part 3B: Tender Engines—Classes D1 to D12, Kenilworth: RCTS, ISBN 0-901115-46-0
- Boddy, M.G.; Brown, W.A.; Neve, E.; Yeadon, W.B. (November 1983), Fry, E.V. (ed.), Part 6B: Tender Engines - Classes O1 to P2, Locomotives of the L.N.E.R., Kenilworth: RCTS, ISBN 0-901115-54-1
- Boddy, M. G.; Brown, W. A.; Hennigan, W.; Hoole, Ken; Neve, E.; Yeadon, W. B. (September 1984), Fry, E. V. (ed.), Locomotives of the L.N.E.R., Part 6C: Tender Engines—Classes Q1 to Y10, Kenilworth: RCTS, ISBN 0-901115-55-X
- Boddy, M. G.; Brown, W. A.; Fry, E. V.; Hennigan, W.; Hoole, Ken; Manners, F.; Neve, E.; Platt, E. N. T.; Proud, P.; Yeadon, W. B. (March 1977), Fry, E. V. (ed.), Locomotives of the L.N.E.R., Part 9A: Tank Engines—Classes L1 to N19, Kenilworth: RCTS, ISBN 0-901115-40-1
- Boddy, M. G.; Brown, W. A.; Fry, E. V.; Hennigan, W.; Hoole, Ken; Manners, F.; Neve, E.; Platt, E. N. T.; Proud, P.; Yeadon, W. B. (June 1977), Fry, E. V. (ed.), Locomotives of the L.N.E.R., Part 9B: Tank Engines—Classes Q1 to Z5, Kenilworth: RCTS, ISBN 0-901115-41-X
- Casserley, H.C. (1974), Locomotives at the Grouping - 2 - London & North Eastern Railway, Ian Allan Limited, ISBN 0-7110-0553-2
- Dow, George (1969), Great Central Album, Ian Allan Limited, ISBN 0-7110-0070-0
- Fry, E. V., ed. (September 1966), Locomotives of the L.N.E.R., Part 5: Tender Engines—Classes J1 to J37, Kenilworth: RCTS, ISBN 0-901115-12-6
- Fry, E. V., ed. (April 1964), Locomotives of the L.N.E.R., part 7: Tank Engines - Classes A5 to H2, Kenilworth: RCTS, ISBN 0-901115-13-4
- Hancox, A.C. (1995), The Harmonious Blacksmith Robinson, The Stephenson Locomotive Society, ISBN 0-903881-03-9
- Haresnape, Brian; Rowledge, Peter (1982), Robinson Locomotives, a pictorial history, Shepperton, Surrey: Ian Allan Limited, ISBN 0-7110-1151-6
- Jackson, David (1996), J.G. Robinson: A Lifetime's Work, Headington: Oakwood Press, ISBN 0-85361-497-0, OL98
- Russell, Patrick (March–April 1997), Locomotives Illustrated 112: Robinson Eight-coupled Locomotives, Worcester Park, Surrey: RAS Publishing, ISSN 0307-1804
- Smith, Martin (July–August 1993), Locomotives Illustrated 90: The Robinson Great Central 4-4-0s, Worcester Park, Surrey: RAS Publishing, ISSN 0307-1804
- Oxford Dictionary of National Biography: Robinson, John George by George W. Carpenter

Business positions
Preceded by Harry Pollitt (engineer)	Locomotive Engineer of the Great Central Railway; 1900-1902	post renamed
New title post renamed	Chief Mechanical Engineer of the Great Central Railway; 1902-1922	Succeeded by Nigel Gresley (LNER)
