= GCR Class 8A =

Class of British steam locomotives

GCR Class 8A LNER Class Q4
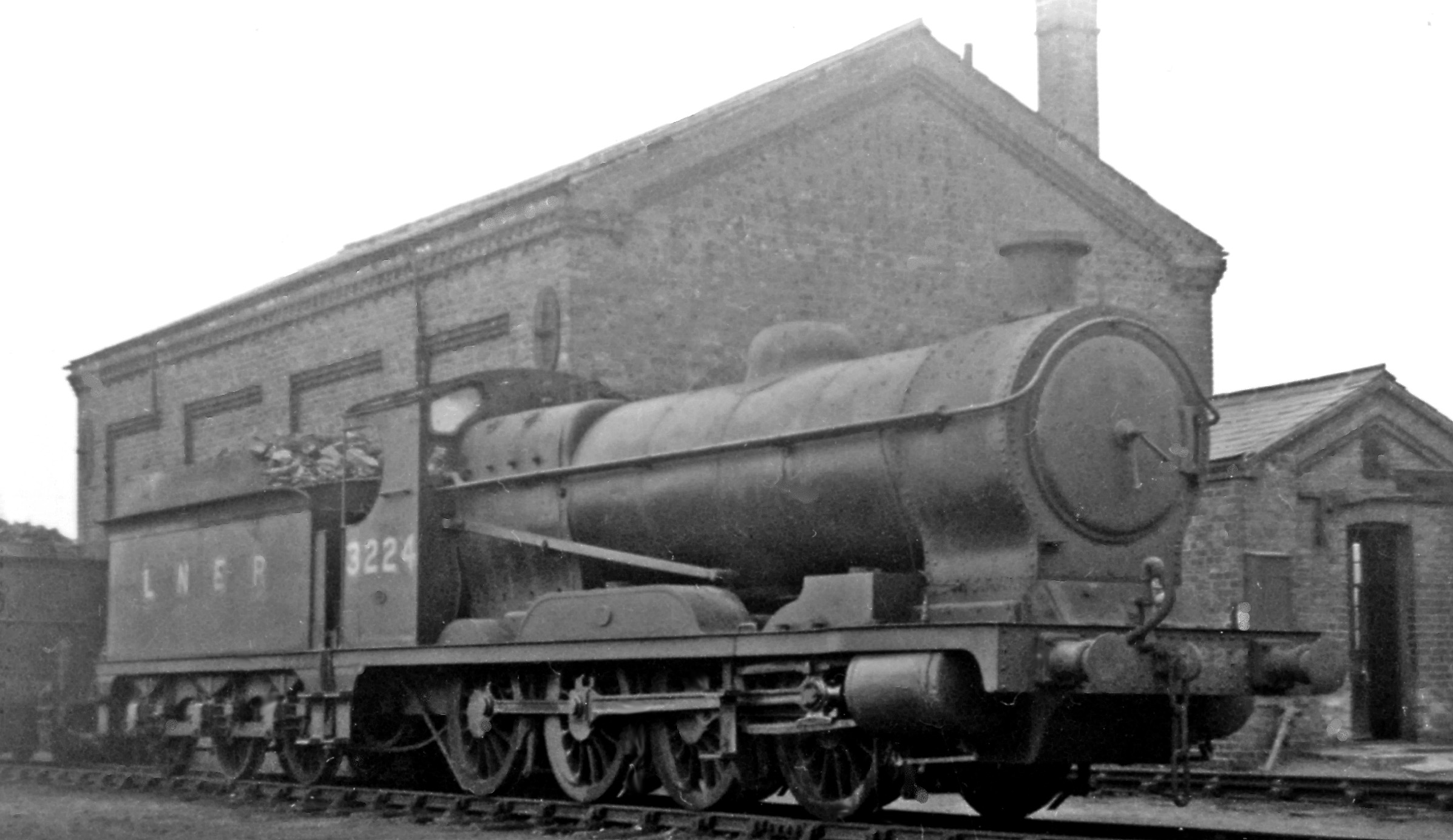
- A GCR Class 8A at Retford Locomotive Depot on 13 April 1947
Type and origin
- Power type: Steam
- Designer: John G. Robinson
- Builder: Neilson, Reid & Co. (3); Kitson & Co. (51); Gorton Works (35)
- Serial number: NR: 6251–6253; Kitson: 4202–4209, 4475–4487
- Build date: 1902–1911
- Total produced: 89
Specifications
- Configuration
  - Whyte: 0-8-0
  - UIC: D n2, later D h2
- Gauge: 1,435 mm (4 ft 8 1/2 in)
- Driver dia.: 4 ft 8 in (1.422 m)
- Tender wheels: 4 ft 4 in (1.321 m)
- Wheelbase
  - Axle spacing (Asymmetrical): 5 ft 8 1/2 in (1.740 m) +; 5 ft 5 1/2 in (1.664 m) +; 5 ft 11 in (1.803 m)
- Length
  - Over beams: 52 ft 2 3/4 in (15.919 m)
- Loco weight: 62.40 long tons (63.40 t)
- Fuel type: Coal
- Fuel capacity: 6 long tons 0 cwt (13,400 lb or 6.1 t)
- Water cap.: 3,250 imp gal (14,800 L; 3,900 US gal) or 4,000 imp gal (18,000 L; 4,800 US gal)
- Firebox
  - Type: Belpaire
- Boiler
  - Pitch: 8 ft 4 1/4 in (2.55 m)
  - Diameter: 4 ft 9 in (1.45 m)
  - Tube plates: 15 ft 0 in (4.57 m)
- Boiler pressure: 180 lbf/in^{2} (1 MPa)
- Cylinders: Two, outside
- Cylinder size: 19 in × 26 in (483 mm × 660 mm)
Performance figures
- Tractive effort: 25,644 lbf (114.07 kN)
Career
- Operators: Great Central Railway; London and North Eastern Railway; British Railways
- Power class: 5F
- Number in class: 89
- Numbers: GCR: 1052-1054, 56-59, 64-65, 67-68, 70-71, 85-87, 91-92, 135-140, 142-153, 1073-1077, 1132-1144, 39, 44, 48-49, 62-63, 212-213, 356, 159-164, 401, 1174-1177, 956-960, 1178, 961-962, 1179, 963-965, 1180-1182; LNER (1924): 6052-6054, 5056-5059, 5064-5065, 5067-5068, 5070-5071, 5085-5087, 5091-5092, 5135-5140, 5142-5153, 6073-6077, 6132-6144, 5039, 5044, 5048-5049, 5062-5063, 5212-5213, 5356, 5159-5164, 5401, 6174-6177, 5956-5960, 6178, 5961-5962, 6179, 5963-5965, 6180-6182; LNER (1946): 3200-3210, 3212-3217, 3219-3221, 3223-3229, 3231-3238, 3240-3241, 3243; BR: 63200-63202, 63204, 63207, 63216-63217, 63220, 63223, 63225, 63227, 63232-63234, 63236, 63240, 63243
- Nicknames: Tinies
- Delivered: November 1902 to February 1911
- Withdrawn: 1934-1941,(46),1947-1951,(43)
- Preserved: 0
- Disposition: 13 rebuilt to Class Q1; remainder scrapped

The Great Central Railway (GCR) Class 8A was a class of 0-8-0 steam locomotive built between 1902 and 1911 for handling heavy coal trains over the Pennines. They all passed to the LNER in 1923, who redesignated them Class Q4. They were withdrawn from service between 1934 and 1951.

== History ==
89 locomotives were built at three establishments between 1902 and 1911 as follows:

Construction
Builder	Order number	Works numbers	Quantity	Built	GCR numbers
Neilson, Reid & Co.	E886	6251–3	3	November 1902	1052–1054
Kitson & Co.	273A	4202–34	33	September 1903 – May 1904	56–59, 64-65/67-68, 70-71, 85–87, 91-92, 135–140, 142–153
Kitson & Co.	306L	4335–9	5	July–August 1905	1073–1077
Kitson & Co.	333T	4475–87	13	February–April 1907	1132–1144
Gorton Works	—	—	15	February–December 1909	39, 44, 48-49, 62-63, 212-213, 356, 159–164
Gorton Works	—	—	20	June 1910 – February 1911	401, 1174–1177, 956–960, 1178-1179, 961–965, 1180–1182

The initial three were part of a combined order to be built by Neilson Reid for 18 locomotives that included six of Class 8; a number of components were common to the two classes. The last three were built in early 1911; later that year, the prototype Class 8K 2-8-0 appeared, which was an enlargement of the Class 8A design, and no more Class 8A locomotives were built.

Many of the class were fitted with superheaters from 1914 onwards, but the process was not completed – the maximum number with superheated boilers was 70. In addition, boilers were frequently exchanged for maintenance purposes, and several locomotives that had carried a superheated boiler reverted to saturated steam following a repair, and some of these later became superheated again. Eight locomotives were never superheated. In 1916, no. 1134 was given larger cylinders of the same type as Class 8K – these had piston valves and a bore of 21 inches. Five more (LNER nos. 5136/7/53/60, 6076) were similarly equipped by the LNER between 1928 and 1933.

Two sizes of tender were used: the 41 locomotives built during 1902–05 carried 3,250 gallons of water and six tons of coal; the 48 built during 1907–11 had the water capacity increased to 4,000 gallons.

The class was designed to haul heavy coal trains from the South Yorkshire Coalfield westwards to Manchester and Liverpool, and eastwards to the ports at Grimsby and Immingham; until 1911 they also worked southwards to the marshalling yards at Woodford Halse. For this purpose, they were allocated to the locomotive depots at Annesley, Gorton, Grimsby, Keadby, Mexborough, Sheffield and Staveley. After the Lancashire, Derbyshire and East Coast Railway (LDECR) amalgamated with the GCR in 1907, some were sent to the former LD&ECR depots at Langwith and Tuxford. Fifteen were loaned to the Railway Operating Division from April–May 1917 and sent to France; they were returned to the GCR in April–July 1919.

All were inherited by the LNER at the start of 1923, which classified them as Class Q4 and the GCR numbers were increased by 5000 during 1924–27. Following the Grouping, the LNER redeployed some of class Q4 to former Great Northern Railway (GNR) and Great Eastern Railway depots, such as Ardsley, Bradford, Doncaster, March and Retford. The locomotives as built were too tall to run over some LNER lines outside the former GCR territory, so reduced height chimneys and domes were fitted, and the whistles moved lower down, in order that the overall height could be brought below 13 feet and so clear the loading gauge of the former GNR. The LNER carried out other modifications too: besides the continued fitment of 21-inch cylinders and piston valves and the fitment (or removal) of superheaters, all of the 3,250-gallon tenders were replaced by 4,000-gallon tenders from other former GCR locomotives – this process was completed in 1930, although a few locomotives ran with the smaller tenders temporarily. Variants were dealt with through class parts, but these were occasionally revised.

Class parts
Period	Class Q4/1	Class Q4/2	Class Q4/3	Class Q4/4
1923 – December 1924	3,250 gallon tender	4,000 gallon tender	—	—
December 1924 – December 1928	Overall height more than 13 feet	Overall height less than 13 feet	—	
December 1928 – December 1943	Over 13 feet, 4,000 gallon tender	Under 13 feet, 4,000 gallon tender	Over 13 feet, 3,250 gallon tender	Under 13 feet, 3,250 gallon tender
December 1943 on	Saturated boiler	Superheated boiler	—	—

Withdrawal began in 1934; 41 had been withdrawn by January 1940 when withdrawals stopped due to World War 2. Between 1942 and 1945, 13 locomotives were rebuilt by Edward Thompson to 0-8-0T and reclassified Class Q1; in 1943, after four had been dealt with, the LNER renumbering scheme was prepared. Under this, the remaining 44 class Q4 locomotives were to become nos. 3200–43, but before this could be implemented, one more had been withdrawn and nine more rebuilt to Q1, leaving 34 to be renumbered during 1946. All of these survived to be nationalised at the start of 1948; but only 17 received British Railways numbers, being the 1946 LNER numbers increased by 60000. The last were withdrawn in 1951.
