= GCR Class 9N =

Class of 4-6-2 tank locomotives

GCR Class 9N LNER Class A5
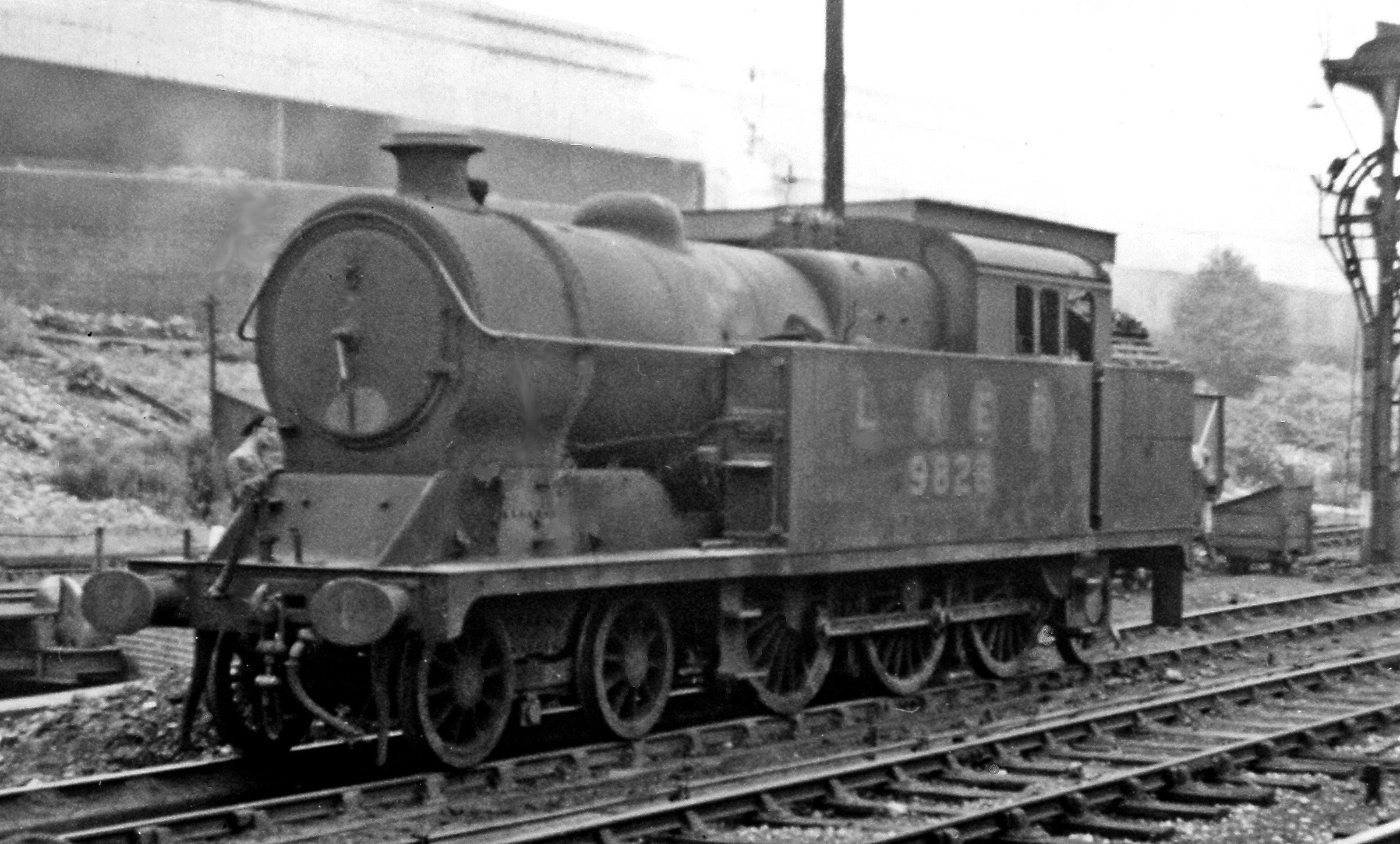
- A5/1 No. 9828 outside Marylebone station 1947
Type and origin
- Power type: Steam
- Designer: John G. Robinson
- Builder: GCR/LNER Gorton Works (31), Hawthorn Leslie and Company (13)
- Serial number: HL: 3616–3628
- Build date: 1911–1926
- Total produced: 44
Specifications
- Configuration
  - Whyte: 4-6-2T
  - UIC: 2′C1′ h2t
- Gauge: 4 ft 8 1/2 in (1,435 mm) standard gauge
- Leading dia.: 3 ft 6 in (1.067 m)
- Driver dia.: 5 ft 7 in (1.702 m)
- Trailing dia.: 3 ft 9 in (1.143 m)
- Length: 42 ft 11 7/8 in (13.103 m)
- Loco weight: A5/1: 85.90 long tons (87.28 t; 96.21 short tons); A5/2: 90.55 long tons (92.00 t; 101.42 short tons)
- Fuel type: Coal
- Fuel capacity: 4.15 long tons (4.22 t; 4.65 short tons)
- Water cap.: 2,280 imp gal (10,400 L; 2,740 US gal)
- Boiler pressure: 180 psi (1.24 MPa)
- Cylinders: Two, inside
- Cylinder size: 20 in × 26 in (508 mm × 660 mm)
- Valve gear: Stephenson
- Valve type: 10-inch (254 mm) piston valves
Performance figures
- Tractive effort: 23,750 lbf (105.6 kN)
Career
- Operators: Great Central Railway, London & North Eastern Railway, British Railways
- Power class: BR: 4P, 3P from May 1953
- Axle load class: LNER/BR: Route Availability 5
- Withdrawn: 1942, 1957–1960
- Disposition: All scrapped

The Great Central Railway Class 9N, classified A5 by the LNER, was a class of 4-6-2 tank locomotives designed by John G. Robinson for suburban passenger services. They were fitted with superheaters, piston valves and Stephenson valve gear.

== Construction and numbering ==
The GCR built 21 locomotives at Gorton Works in three batches between 1911 and 1917. They ordered a fourth batch of ten from Gorton, but this was not built until after the 1923 Grouping, under which GCR became part of the newly formed London and North Eastern Railway (LNER). The LNER then ordered a fifth batch of 13 to a modified design, incorporating reduced boiler mountings and detail differences, and these were built by the outside contractors Hawthorn, Leslie & Co. during 1925–26 (works numbers 3616–28).

Year	GCR Nos.	LNER Nos.	LNER 1946 Nos.
1911	165–170, 23–24, 447–448	5165–70, 5023–24, 5447–48	9800–07, –, 9808
1912	449–452, 128–129	5449–5452, 5128–5129	9809–9814
1917	371–374, 411	5371–5374, 5411	9815–9819
1923	3, 6, 7, 30, 45, 46, 88, 154, 156, 158	5003, 5006, 5007, 5030, 5045, 5046, 5088, 5154, 5156, 5158	9820–9829
1925–26	—	1712/19, 1738, 1750/56, 1760/66–68, 1771, 1782/84, 1790	9830–9842

No. 5447 was withdrawn in 1942 because its frames were badly cracked. In 1943, the remaining engines were allocated new numbers in the 9800–42 block, but these were not applied until 1946. Forty-three locomotives passed to British Railways in 1948, and between 1948 and 1951 their numbers were increased by 60000. The class was divided into two parts in December 1948 as follows:

- A5/1, 69800-69829: Built at Gorton to Robinson's design
- A5/2, 69830-69842: Built by Hawthorn, Leslie with modifications by Gresley

None have been preserved.

Table of withdrawals
Year	Quantity in service at start of year	Quantity withdrawn	Locomotive numbers
1942	44	1	5447
1957	43	2	69815/33
1958	41	23	69802/04/07/10–11/18–19/22/24/26/28/30–32/34–42
1959	18	8	69800/03/05/09/12/16/25/27
1960	10	10	69801/06/08/13–14/17/20–21/23/29

== Modelling ==
A 7 mm scale kit is available from MSC models.

In 2023, Sonic Models released a ready-to-run OO scale model in GCR, LNER, and BR variants.
