= GCR Class 8K =

British steam locomotive class (1911–1966)

GCR Classes 8K and 8M
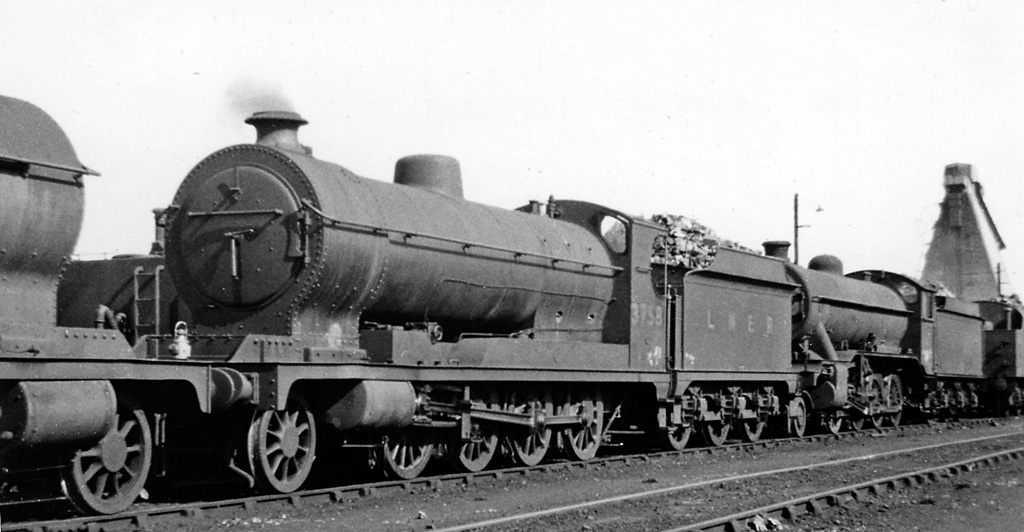
- No. 3758 at Whitemoor Depot
Type and origin
- Power type: Steam
- Designer: John G. Robinson
- Builder: 8K: GCR Gorton Works (56); Kitson & Co. (20); North British Locomotive Co. (50)
- Build date: 1911–1914
- Total produced: 8K: 126; 8M: 19; ROD 2-8-0: 521
Specifications
- Configuration
  - Whyte: 2-8-0
  - UIC: 1′D h2
- Gauge: 4 ft 8 1/2 in (1,435 mm) standard gauge
- Leading dia.: 3 ft 6 in (1,067 mm)
- Driver dia.: 4 ft 8 in (1,422 mm)
- Tender wheels: 4 ft 4 in (1,321 mm)
- Wheelbase: 51 ft 2.5 in (15.608 m)
  - Engine: 25 ft 5 in (7.75 m)
  - Tender: 13 ft (4.0 m)
- Length: 61 ft 8.5 in (18.809 m)
- Loco weight: 72.5–74.65 long tons (73.66–75.85 t; 81.20–83.61 short tons)
- Fuel type: Coal
- Fuel capacity: 6 long tons 0 cwt (13,400 lb or 6.1 t)
- Water cap.: 4,000 imp gal (18,000 L; 4,800 US gal)
- Firebox
  - Type: Belpaire (some engines were fitted with round top fireboxes when the GCR was grouped into the LNER)
  - Grate area: 26.24 sq ft (2.438 m^{2})
- Boiler
  - Tube plates: 15 ft (4,600 mm)
- Boiler pressure: 180 psi (1.24 MPa)
- Heating surface
  - Firebox: 153 sq ft (14.2 m^{2})
  - Tubes: 1,348 sq ft (125.2 m^{2})
  - Total surface: 1,756 sq ft (163.1 m^{2})
- Superheater
  - Type: Robinson
  - Heating area: 225 sq ft (20.9 m^{2})
- Cylinders: Two, outside
- Cylinder size: 21 in × 26 in (533 mm × 660 mm)
- Valve gear: Stephenson
- Valve type: Piston valves
Performance figures
- Tractive effort: 31,325 lbf (139.34 kN)
Career
- Operators: Great Central Railway →; London and North Eastern Railway →; British Railways
- Class: GCR: 8K, 8M; LNER: O4, O5
- Power class: BR: 7F
- Numbers: LNER (from 1946): 3500–3920; BR: 63570–63920
- Axle load class: LNER & BR: Route Availability 6
- Withdrawn: December 1958 – April 1966
- Disposition: One preserved, remainder scrapped

The Great Central Railway (GCR) Class 8K 2-8-0 is a class of steam locomotive designed for heavy freight. Introduced in 1911, and designed by John G. Robinson, 126 were built for the GCR prior to the First World War. Including wartime construction for the British Army ROD and the post-war GCR Class 8M, the class and its derivatives totalled 666 locomotives.

== Great Central Railway ==
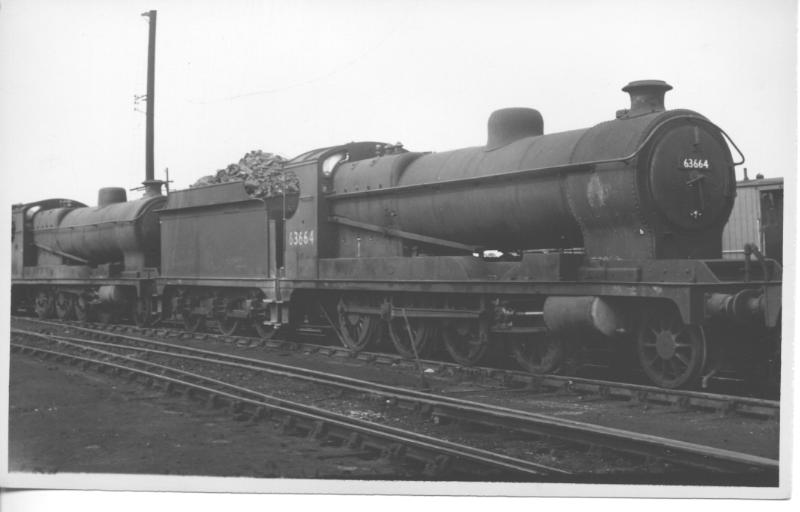
GCR Class 8K (later LNER Class O4/1) loco 63664 at Langwith Junction engine shed on 7 August 1960

The first of the 8K class was outshopped from the GCR's Gorton workshops in 1911. It was essentially a superheated version of an earlier 0-8-0, the 8A class, with the addition of a pony truck. This both supported the greater front end weight and gave a steadier ride. The 8K was introduced to anticipate the increased traffic from the GCR's vast new docks complex at Immingham in North East Lincolnshire and 126 were in traffic by June 1914. During the First World War there were experiments with oil burning 8Ks with larger bogie tenders.

Post-war, a further 19 locomotives were built in 1918–21 to a modified design with a larger boiler (GCR class 8M). In 1922 the GCR rebuilt two Class 8M to Class 8K.

== Railway Operating Division ==
Robust and straightforward, the Class 8K 2-8-0 steamed well and proved outstandingly reliable, qualities that commended the design to the Ministry of Munitions. Sir Sam Fay ensured that it became the standard locomotive during the First World War as the ROD 2-8-0, used by the Railway Operating Division of the Royal Engineers. 521 ROD locomotives were built in 1917–19 to essentially the same design as the GCR's 8K locomotives, differing only in minor details, such as the fitting of Westinghouse Air Brakes and the use of steel for the boiler tubes and inner firebox. After the war, the surviving ROD locomotives were sold to various railway companies, with the GCR itself purchasing 3 in 1919, which were added to its indigenous 8K fleet.

Other surplus ROD locomotives were sold to the London and North Western Railway (30 locomotives), its successor the London, Midland and Scottish Railway (75 locomotives, see LMS ex-ROD 2-8-0), the Great Western Railway (100 locomotives, see GWR 3000 Class), and to various purchasers in Australia and China. Many of these had short lives with their new owners – the LMS locomotives were all scrapped or sold by the 1930s, and half of the GWR fleet was gone by 1930. However, other GWR engines survived well into the 1950s. The last of 13 locomotives sold to J & A Brown for use on the Richmond Vale railway line, in Australia, was retired in 1973, and 3 locomotives in China were only retired in 1990.

== LNER and BR ownership ==
Upon its formation in 1923 the London and North Eastern Railway inherited a total of 131 class 8K and 17 class 8M locomotives from the Great Central Railway. Under the LNER's ownership the 8Ks became known as Class O4, and the 8Ms as Class O5, although all of the O5s were converted to Class O4s by 1946. They were joined by a further 273 former ROD locomotives purchased in 1923–27, bringing the total LNER O4 fleet to 421 locomotives. Some 92 of these were requisitioned by the War Department in 1941 for use in support of Commonwealth forces in the Middle East, none of which would return to Britain.

The O4 locos served widely throughout the LNER system, many being modified to help extend their useful working life on heavy freight trains. Fifty-eight of the class were rebuilt into LNER Thompson Class O1s in 1944–49. 329 LNER O4 locomotives passed to British Railways ownership in 1948. Five locomotives were sold to the Government in 1952 for use in Egypt, and routine withdrawals of BR's class O4s commenced in December 1958. The last examples of the class were withdrawn from operations in the Doncaster area in April 1966, not long before the abandonment of steam altogether.

== Preservation ==
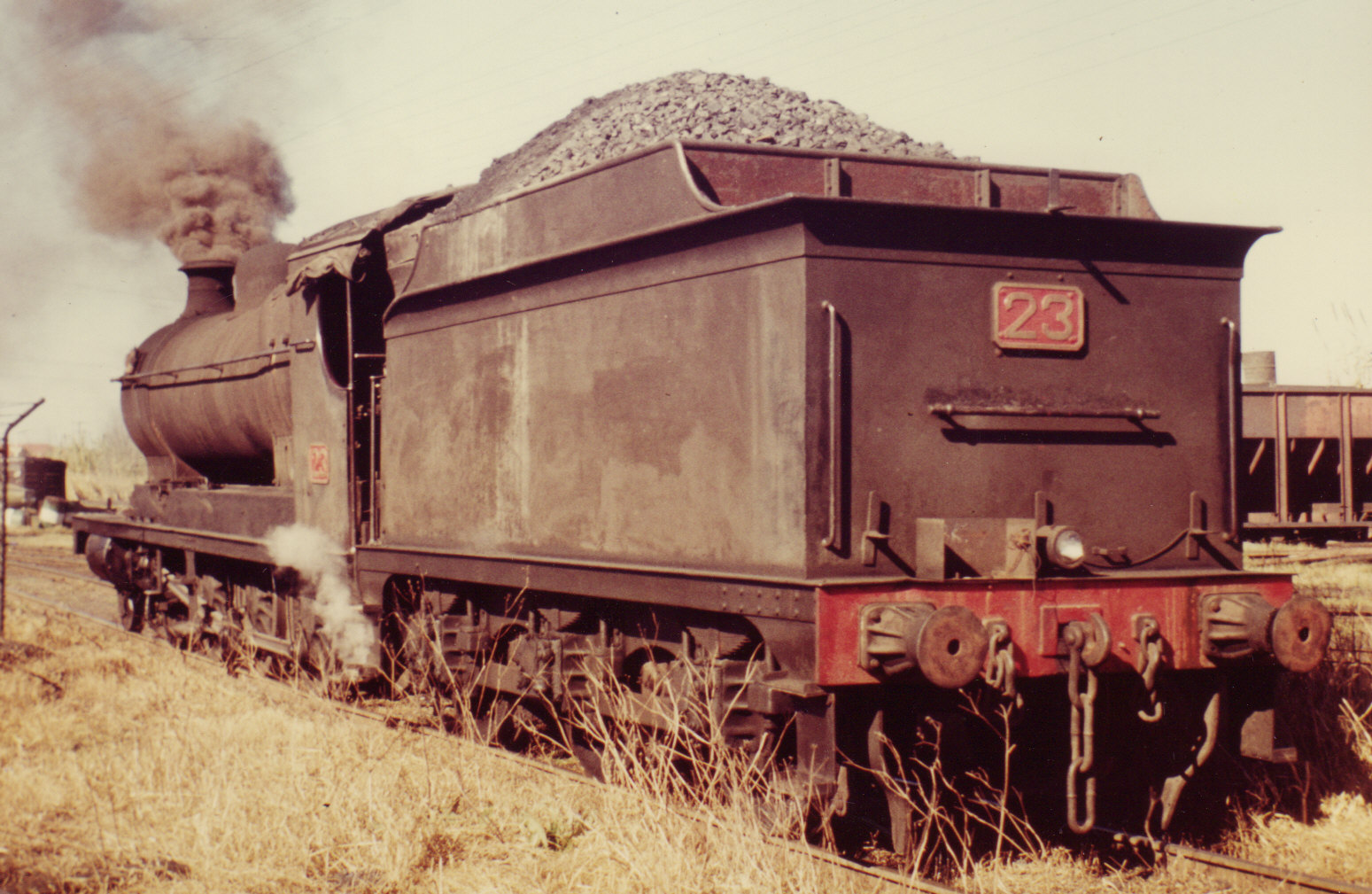
J & A Brown 23 shunting on the Richmond Vale Railway in June 1973

One of the GCR-built 8Ks, BR number 63601 (originally GCR No. 102 built at Gorton in 1911), is preserved in Great Britain where it runs on the preserved Great Central Railway at Loughborough. There are also three ROD 2-8-0s (not used by the GCR or LNER) in New South Wales, Australia. Two are stored at the Dorrigo Steam Railway and Museum and one is being restored on the Richmond Vale Railway.

== Models ==
In 2009 Bachmann Branchline announced a ready-to-run '00' scale model of the Class 8K, marketing it under the LNER class name of O4. The models were of preserved 63601, and models of two scrapped examples (BR 63635 and LNER 6190) have since been released.

In October 2012, RailSimulator.com released a payware add-on of the GCR 8K, again marketed under its LNER O4 classification, for Train Simulator 2013. It was released as a companion to the Woodhead Line add-on, released earlier in the year, and features sounds from the preserved O4 63601 before its boiler ticket ran out, and includes four scenarios for the Woodhead Line and Quickdrive compatibility.

== See also ==
- ROD 2-8-0
- LNER Class O4
- LNER Thompson Class O1
- GWR 3000 Class
- LMS ex-ROD 2-8-0
