= GCR Class 1A =

Class of British 4-6-0 steam locomotives

GCR Class 1A LNER Class B8
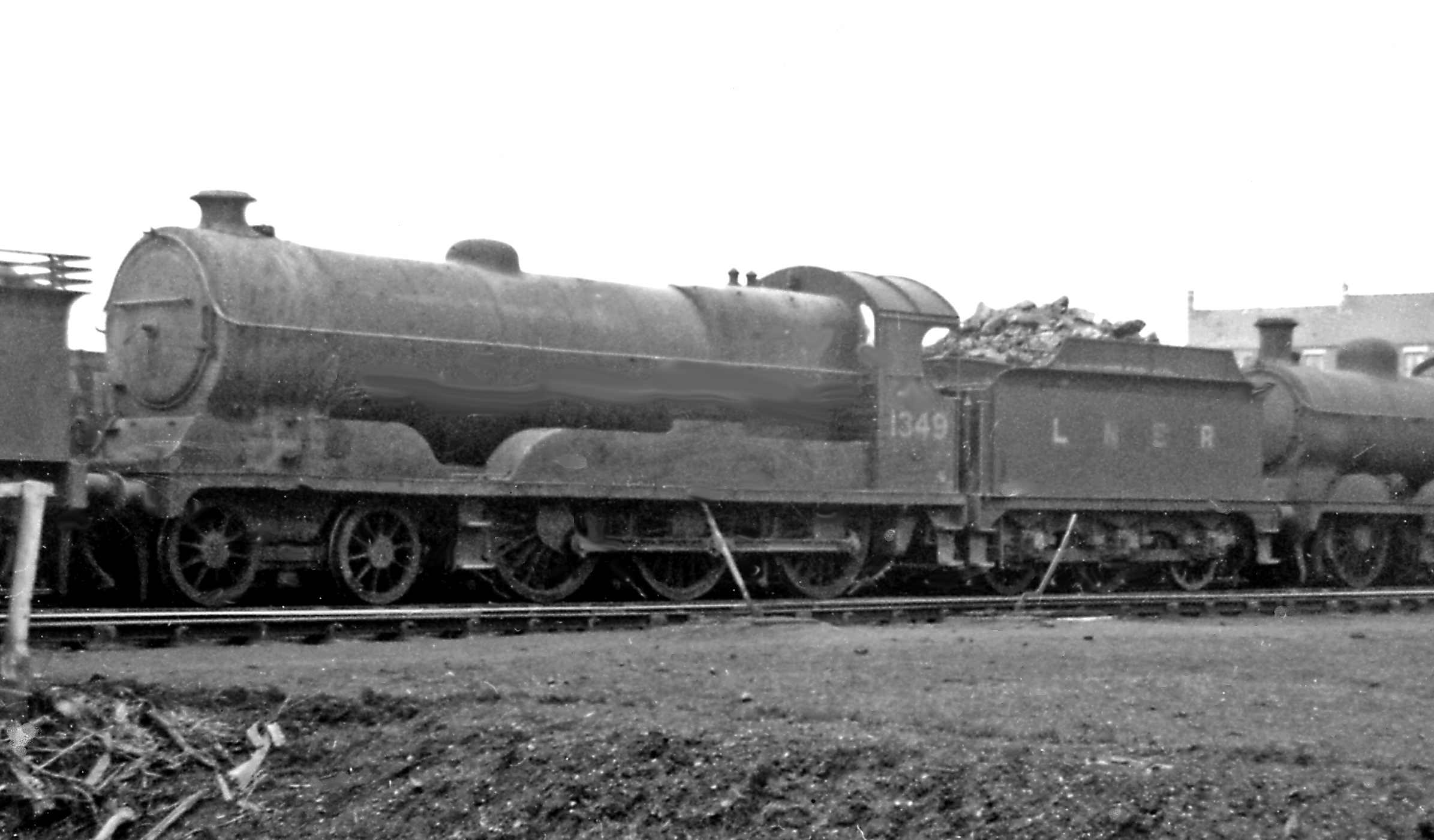
- No. 1349 at Retford (GC) Locomotive Depot 13 April 1947
Type and origin
- Power type: Steam
- Designer: John G. Robinson
- Builder: Gorton Works
- Build date: 1913–1915
- Total produced: 11
Specifications
- Configuration
  - Whyte: 4-6-0
  - UIC: 2'Ch2
- Gauge: 4 ft 8 1/2 in (1,435 mm)
- Leading dia.: 3 ft 6 in (1.067 m)
- Driver dia.: 5 ft 7 in (1.702 m)
- Length: 63 ft 0.3 in (19.210 m)
- Loco weight: 122 long tons (124 t)
- Fuel type: Coal
- Fuel capacity: 6 long tons (6.1 t)
- Water cap.: 4,000 imperial gallons (18,000 L; 4,800 US gal)
- Firebox
  - Grate area: 26 sq ft (2.4 m^{2})
- Boiler
  - Diameter: 5 ft 6 in (1,680 mm)
- Boiler pressure: 180 psi (1.24 MPa)
- Heating surface: 2,183 sq ft (202.8 m^{2})
- Superheater
  - Heating area: 294 sq ft (27.3 m^{2})
- Cylinders: Two, inside
- Cylinder size: 21.5 in × 26 in (546 mm × 660 mm)
Performance figures
- Tractive effort: 27,445 lbf (122.1 kN)
Career
- Operators: Great Central Railway; → London and North Eastern Railway; → British Railways
- Withdrawn: 1947–1949
- Disposition: All scrapped

The Great Central Railway Class 1A, classified B8 by the LNER, was a class of 4-6-0 mixed-traffic locomotives designed by John G. Robinson for fast goods, relief passenger and excursion services. They were known as the ‘Glenalmond Class’ and were a smaller wheeled version of Robinson's earlier Sir Sam Fay express passenger class (LNER Class B2), which they closely resembled.

== History ==
=== GCR locomotives ===
The prototype was built at Gorton Locomotive Works, during 1913 and the remaining ten, one year later. They had the same design problems associated with the Sir Sam Fay class and were mainly used on secondary passenger and freight services.

== Numbering ==
Table of numbers
| Built | GCR Nos. | LNER Nos. | LNER 1946 Nos. | Name | Withdrawn |
|---|---|---|---|---|---|
| June 1913 | 4 | 5004 | 1349 | Glenalmond | November 1947 |
| July 1914 | 439 | 5439 | 1350 | Sutton Nelthorpe | August 1947 |
| August 1914 | 440 | 5440 | 1351 | — | October 1947 |
| September 1914 | 441 | 5441 | 1352 | — | May 1947 |
| September 1914 | 442 | 5442 | 1353 | — | March 1949 |
| October 1914 | 443 | 5443 | 1354 | — | March 1948 |
| October 1914 | 444 | 5444 | 1355 | — | September 1948 |
| November 1914 | 445 | 5445 | 1356 | — | August 1947 |
| November 1914 | 446 | 5446 | 1357 | Earl Roberts of Kandahar | April 1949 |
| December 1914 | 279 | 5279 | 1358 | Earl Kitchener of Khartoum | August 1948 |
| January 1915 | 280 | 5280 | 1359 | — | March 1947 |

== Preservation ==
None have been preserved.
