= GCR Class 9J =

Early 20th century locomotive

GCR Class 9J LNER Class J11
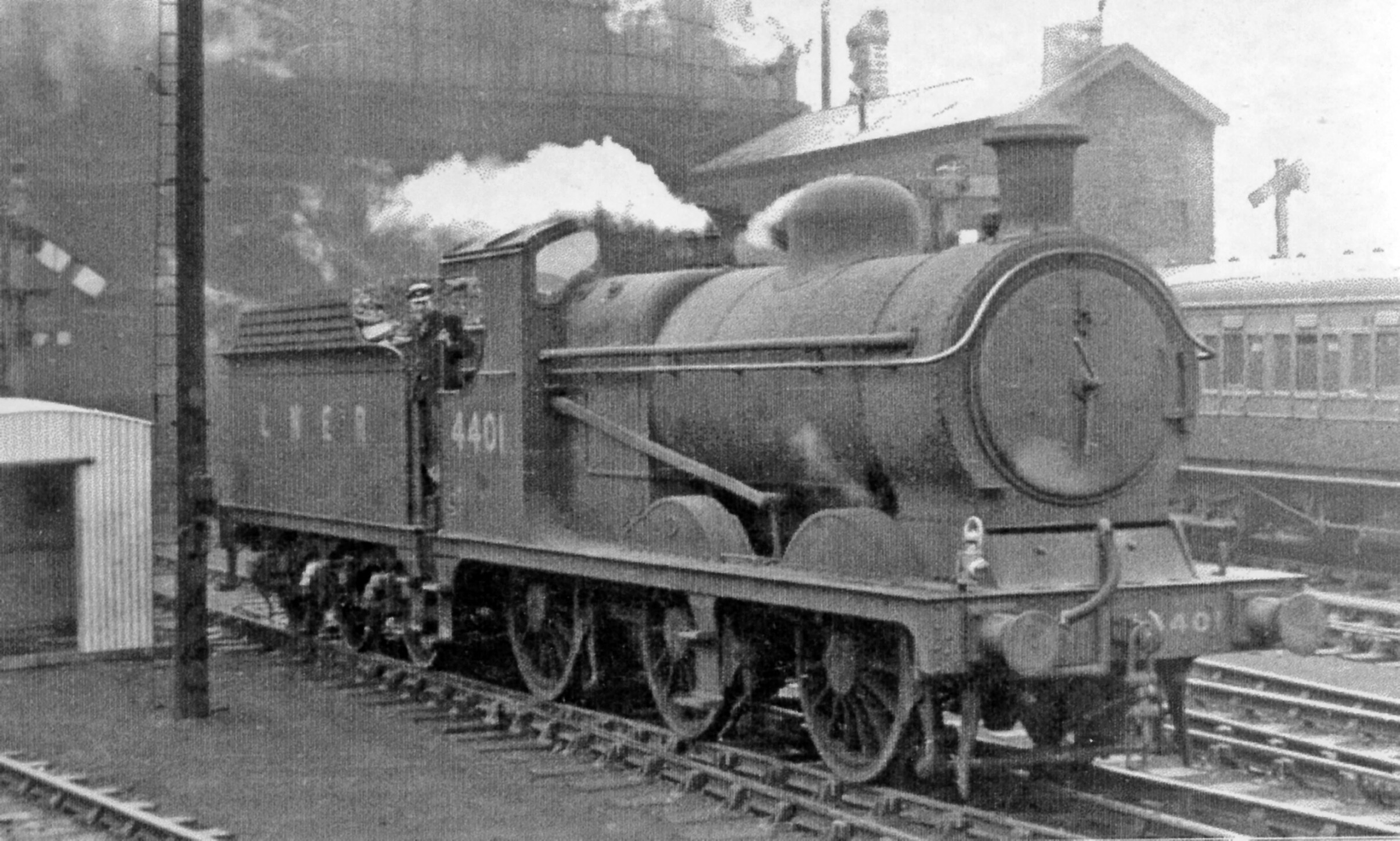
- No. 4401 at Manchester London Road Station in 1948
Type and origin
- Power type: Steam
- Designer: John G. Robinson
- Builder: Neilson, Reid & Co. (49); Beyer, Peacock & Co. (25); Gorton Works (70); Vulcan Foundry (15); Yorkshire Engine Co. (15)
- Build date: 1901–1910
- Total produced: 174
Specifications
- Configuration
  - Whyte: 0-6-0
  - UIC: C n2t
- Gauge: 4 ft 8 1/2 in (1,435 mm)
- Driver dia.: 5 ft 2 in (1.575 m)
- Length: 53 ft 1 3/4 in (16.20 m)
- Height: 13 ft 2 in (4.01 m)
- Axle load: 18 long tons 0 cwt (40,300 lb or 18.3 t)
- Loco weight: 52 long tons 0 cwt (116,500 lb or 52.8 t)
- Tender weight: 48 long tons 6 cwt (108,200 lb or 49.1 t)
- Fuel type: Coal
- Fuel capacity: 6 long tons 0 cwt (13,400 lb or 6.1 t)
- Water cap.: 4,000 imp gal (18,000 L; 4,800 US gal)
- Firebox
  - Grate area: 19 sq ft (1.8 m^{2})
- Boiler pressure: 180 psi (1.24 MPa)
- Heating surface
  - Firebox: 130 sq ft (12 m^{2})
  - Total surface: Original 1,426 sq ft (132.5 m^{2}); Superheated 1,258 sq ft (116.9 m^{2})
- Superheater
  - Heating area: 139 sq ft (12.9 m^{2})
- Cylinders: Two, inside
- Cylinder size: 18.5 in × 26 in (470 mm × 660 mm)
- Valve gear: Stephenson
Performance figures
- Tractive effort: 21,960 lbf (97.68 kN)
Career
- Operators: Great Central Railway; → London and North Eastern Railway; → British Railways
- Class: GCR: 9J; LNER: J11
- Power class: BR: 3F
- Number in class: 174
- Nicknames: Pom-Poms
- Axle load class: LNER/BR: Route Availability: 5
- Withdrawn: 1954–1962
- Disposition: All scrapped

The GCR Class 9J (LNER Class J11) was a class of 174 0-6-0 steam locomotives designed by John G. Robinson for freight work on the Great Central Railway (GCR) in 1901. They were a part of the Railway Operating Division during World War 1. The class acquired the nickname "Pom-Poms" due to the similarity of their exhaust noise to that of the "Pom-Pom" quick-firing gun used in the South African War.

== Career ==
=== London and North Eastern Railway ===
They passed to the London and North Eastern Railway (LNER) in 1923. The LNER classified them as J11 with sub-classes J11/1 to J11/5 because of detail differences.

=== British Railways ===
The whole class survived into British Railways (BR) ownership in 1948 and their BR numbers were 64280–64453. All had been withdrawn and scrapped by 1962 and none have been preserved.
