= GCR Class 1 =

Class of 6 British 4-6-0 locomotives, later LNER class B2, then B19

GCR Class 1 LNER Class B2 (later B19)
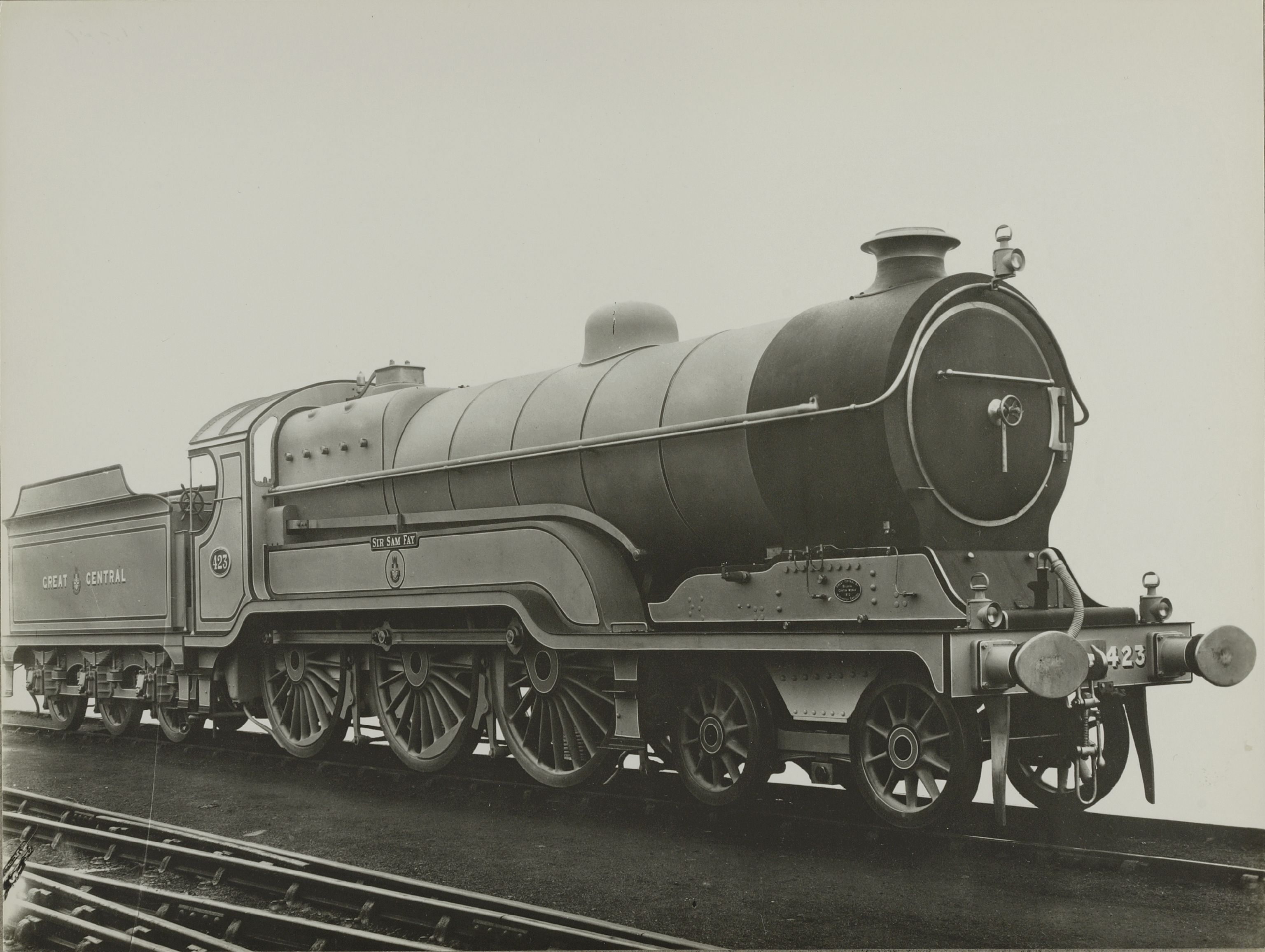
- GCR Class 1 No. 423 Sir Sam Fay
Type and origin
- Power type: Steam
- Designer: John G. Robinson
- Builder: GCR Gorton Works
- Build date: December 1912 – December 1913
- Total produced: 6
Specifications
- Configuration
  - Whyte: 4-6-0
  - UIC: 2'Ch2
- Gauge: 4 ft 8 1/2 in (1,435 mm)
- Leading dia.: 3 ft 6 in (1.067 m)
- Driver dia.: 6 ft 9 in (2.057 m)
- Wheelbase: Loco: 28 ft 10 in (8.79 m)
- Length: 63 ft 0 3/8 in (19.212 m)
- Axle load: 19 long tons 10 cwt (43,700 lb or 19.8 t)
- Adhesive weight: 57 long tons 10 cwt (128,800 lb or 58.4 t)
- Loco weight: 75 long tons 4 cwt (168,400 lb or 76.4 t)
- Tender weight: 48 long tons 6 cwt (108,200 lb or 49.1 t)
- Fuel capacity: 6 long tons 0 cwt (13,400 lb or 6.1 t)
- Water cap.: 4,000 imp gal (18,000 L; 4,800 US gal)
- Firebox
  - Grate area: 26.5 sq ft (2.46 m^{2})
- Boiler
  - Diameter: 5 ft 3.5 in (1,613 mm) to 5 ft 6 in (1,680 mm)
- Boiler pressure: 180 psi (1.24 MPa)
- Heating surface: 2,377 sq ft (220.8 m^{2})
- Superheater
  - Heating area: 440 sq ft (41 m^{2})
- Cylinders: Two, inside
- Cylinder size: 21.5 in × 26 in (546 mm × 660 mm)
- Valve gear: Stephenson
- Valve type: 10-inch (250 mm) piston valves
Performance figures
- Tractive effort: 22,700 lbf (101.0 kN)
Career
- Operators: GCR; →LNER
- Class: GCR: 1; LNER: B2 (B19 from 1945)
- Numbers: GCR: 423–428; LNER: 5423–5428 (1490–1493 from 1946)
- Nicknames: Sir Sam Fay class
- Withdrawn: 1944–1947
- Disposition: All scrapped

The GCR Class 1 was a class of steam locomotives designed by John G. Robinson for the Great Central Railway, and introduced to service between December 1912 and 1913. In the 1923 grouping, they all passed to the London and North Eastern Railway which placed them in class B2. Their classification was changed to B19 in 1945, and all had been retired by the end of 1947.

== Service ==
Although commonly believed to be intended as express passenger locomotives, the Great Central classified and used them as mixed traffic locomotives. The minutes of the Locomotive Committee show that they were ordered as a superheated version of the 8F (Immingham) class mixed traffic locomotives. They were described as mixed traffic locomotives in the contemporary Great Central publication Per Rail, which promoted the company's goods services. When new, three of the class – 423, 425 and 428 – were painted in GCR's standard green passenger livery, while the other three – 424, 426 and 427 – were painted in the lined black goods livery; all were green by the end of 1922.

Their initial allocations included the 'Pipe trains', the vacuum-brake fitted express goods services between Manchester and London, among the most important services on the Great Central. There is no evidence that they were intended to challenge the contemporary 11E (Director) class 4-4-0s for the generally light express passenger services of the pre-1914 years on the London Extension.

== Alleged problems ==
It has been claimed that the GCR Class 1 had problems in service which led to their alleged demotion from express passenger use, but there appears to be no evidence to support these claims. The design of the fire grate and ash pan was very similar to, for example, the later Gresley K3 2-6-0s, and their fireboxes were deep and relatively large for their 26.5 square feet (2.46 m^{2}) grate area. Overheating troubles with axleboxes have been alleged, related to the large force from the inside cylinders. Robinson in fact took care to make the coupled boxes as large as possible, 9 by 9 inches (229 mm × 229 mm) on the two leading axles and 8 by 12 inches (203 mm × 305 mm) on the trailing set. A more likely source of initial trouble was the marine-type big ends fitted to the first five, since the sixth reverted to strap and cotter type.

== Loco details ==
Table of numbers and names
Built	GCR No.	LNER No.	LNER 1946 No.	Name	Withdrawn
December 1912	423	5423	1490	Sir Sam Fay	April 1947
January 1913	424	5424	—	City of Lincoln	November 1945
February 1913	425	5425	1491	City of Manchester	July 1947
March 1913	426	5426	—	City of Chester	December 1944
March 1913	427	5427	1492	City of London (Note: Name removed in September 1937, and applied to streamlined B17/5 No. 2870)	November 1947
December 1913	428	5428	1493	City of Liverpool	April 1947
