= GCR Class 8 =

British 4-6-0 steam locomotive class

Great Central Railway Class 8
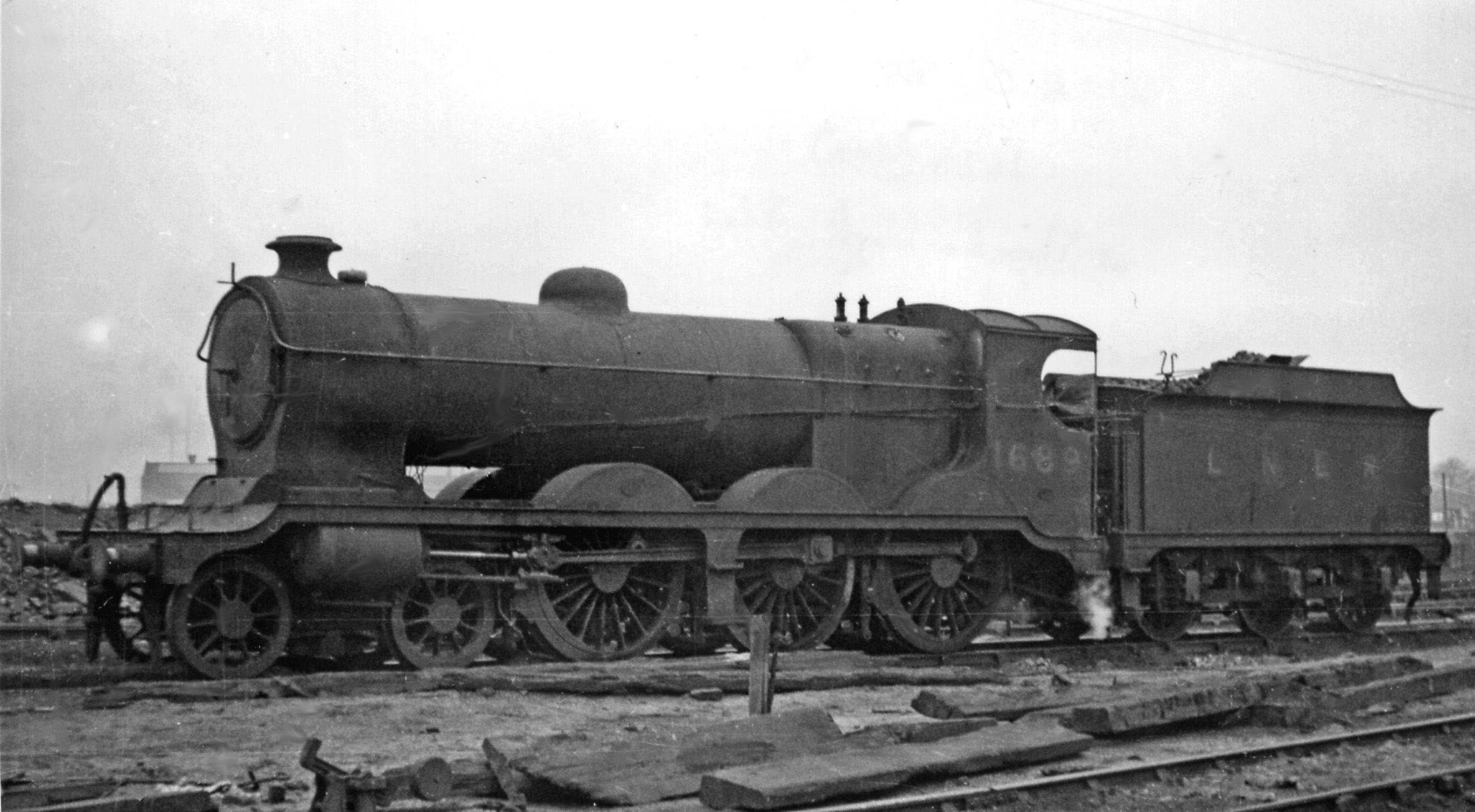
- Ex-Great Central 'Fish' class 4-6-0 at Mexborough Locomotive Depot
Type and origin
- Power type: Steam
- Designer: John G. Robinson
- Builder: Neilson & Co. (6), Beyer, Peacock & Co. (8)
- Build date: 1902 (6), 1904 (8)
- Total produced: 14
Specifications
- Configuration
  - Whyte: 4-6-0
  - UIC: 2'C
- Gauge: 4 ft 8 1/2 in (1,435 mm)
- Leading dia.: 3 ft 6 in (1.067 m)
- Driver dia.: 6 ft 1 in (1.854 m)
- Length: 60 ft 9 1/4 in (18.523 m)
- Loco weight: 64.15 long tons (65.18 t)
- Firebox
  - Grate area: 23.5 sq ft (2.18 m^{2})
- Boiler
  - Diameter: 4 ft 6.5 in (1,384 mm) to 4 ft 9 in (1,450 mm)
- Boiler pressure: 180 psi (1.24 MPa)
- Heating surface: Saturated: 1,795 sq ft (166.8 m^{2}); Superheated:1,338 sq ft (124.3 m^{2})
- Cylinders: Two, outside
- Cylinder size: 19 in × 26 in (483 mm × 660 mm)
- Valve gear: Stephenson
- Valve type: Slide valves
Performance figures
- Tractive effort: 19,672 lbf (87.51 kN)
Career
- Operators: Great Central Railway; → London & North Eastern Railway; → British Railways
- Class: GCR: 8; LNER: B5
- Numbers: GCR: 1067–1072, 180–187; LNER: 6067–6072, 5180–5187; later 1678–1682; BR: 61678–61682
- Nicknames: Fish engines
- Retired: 1939–1950
- Disposition: All scrapped

The Great Central Railway Class 8, known as the London and North Eastern Railway Class B5 following the 1923 Grouping, was a class of fourteen 4-6-0 steam locomotives designed to haul fast goods trains, in particular fish trains.

They were nicknamed "Fish Engines" because of their designed role and due to their frequent use on the fast fish trains heading from Grimsby to places like London. Half of the class were passed on into service with British Railways in 1948 and the last locomotive was withdrawn in 1950.

== Models ==
A 1/5 scale, 10.25 in gauge model of number 181 has been made by Andrew Simkins. This model is externally faithful to Robinson's design, but also uses a footwell to conceal most of the driver in the tender. It was showcased and won an award at the Model engineering exhibition in 2003. It has since been seen on several of the 10.25 in gauge railways around Britain.
