= List of LNER locomotives as of 31 December 1947 =

The following is a list of locomotives of the London and North Eastern Railway as of 31 December 1947. This date is significant because nationalisation of the Big Four occurred the next day, 1 January 1948. Thus this is the list of locomotives as inherited by British Railways. At this time there were approximately 6300 steam locomotives, four diesel electric shunters and one petrol mechanical shunter.

At the time, departmental stock carried numbers within the capital stock series, so are listed there.

The numbering at this time fully reflected the LNER 1946 renumbering scheme, which had grouped most classes into single number blocks. BR allocated numbers in March 1948 (in the meantime there were a few withdrawals and new construction). Most ex-LNER engines had 60000 added to their numbers, with a few exceptions.

In terms of locomotive taxonomy, the LNER had a superficially simple classification system that got a bit messy under close examination. Where it has been considered prudent therefore, subclasses have been identified rather than classes in order to link to the appropriate articles. The classifications given are the one in use at the time; i.e. reflects changes in classification up to that point but not subsequently.

Willie Yeadon gives full allocations for this date in his book LNER locomotive allocations: 1947: the last day (Irwell Press, 1989). This list is also repeated in the book LNER 150, and can be derived from Longworth.

== List of locomotives ==
Nos	Class	Wheel arrangement	No. in class	Notes
1–34	A4	4-6-2	34	
35–67/69–112	A3	4-6-2	77	Formerly Class A1
68	A10	4-6-2	1	Formerly Class A1; rebuilt to Class A3 in 1948
113	A1/1	4-6-2	1	A1 rebuilt by Thompson
500, 511–24	A2/3	4-6-2	15	Thompson design
501–506	A2/2	4-6-2	6	P2 rebuilt by Thompson
507–510	A2/1	4-6-2	4	Thompson design
525	A2	4-6-2	1	Peppercorn design
800–983	V2	2-6-2	184	
1000–1273	B1	4-6-0	274	Thompson design
1353–55/57–58	B8	4-6-0	5	ex-GCR 1A
1360–97	B7	4-6-0	38	ex-GCR 9G; 10 built by LNER, Survivors renumbered by BR 61702-13
1400–68	B16	4-6-0	69	ex-NER S3; 32 built by LNER
1469–70/75–76	B9	4-6-0	4	ex-GCR 8G
1482/83/85/88	B4	4-6-0	4	ex-GCR Class 8F
1497	B3	4-6-0	1	ex-GCR 9P
1500–80 (with gaps)	B12	4-6-0	72	ex-GER S69
1600–02/04–72 (with gaps)	B17	4-6-0	64	
1603/71	B2	4-6-0	2	B17 rebuilt by Thompson as two-cylinder
1680–81/85–86/88–90	B5	4-6-0	7	ex-GCR Class 8
1699	B13	4-6-0	1	Formerly NER Class S; in departmental stock
1700–01	V4	2-6-2	2	
1720–94	K2	2-6-0	75	ex-GNR Class H2
1800–62/64–1992	K3	2-6-0	192	ex-GNR Class H4; 183 built by LNER
1863	K5	2-6-0	1	K3 rebuilt by Thompson
1993–96/98	K4	2-6-0	5	
1997	K1/1	2-6-0	1	K4 rebuilt by Thompson as two-cylinder
2000, 2116–2148 (with gaps)	D3	4-4-0	19	
2059–72 (with gaps)	D31	4-4-0	7	ex-NBR Class M 4-4-0
2111–12	D17	4-4-0	2	ex-NER Class M1
2150–199 (with gaps)	D2	4-4-0	31	ex-GNR Class D1
2203/05/07–09/14–15	ex-GNR Class D1	4-4-0	7	
2225/27–35/38/40–43/46–49/51–52/55–56	D41	4-4-0	22	
2260–62/64–65/67–69	D40	4-4-0	18	
2300–09/11–15/17–20/22/24–25/29–30/32–33	D9	4-4-0	26	ex-GCR Class 11B
2340–97 (with gaps)	D20	4-4-0	50	ex-NER Class R
2400–06/09–13	D29	4-4-0	12	ex-NBR J Class
2417-32/34-42	D30	4-4-0	25	ex-NBR J Class
2443-54	D32	4-4-0	10	ex-NBR K Class
2455-66	D33	4-4-0	10	ex-NBR K Class
2467–85/87–90/92–98	D34	4-4-0	30	ex-NBR K Class
2501–2538 (with gaps)	D15	4-4-0	13	ex-GER Class D56
2510–2620 (with gaps)	D16	4-4-0	104	ex-GER Class H88; 10 built by LNER. This is a bit complicated
2650–59	D10	4-4-0	10	ex-GCR Class 11E
2660–94	D11	4-4-0	35	ex-GCR Class 11F
2700–67/69–75	D49	4-4-0	75	
2768	D	4-4-0	1	D49 rebuilt by Thompson as two-cylinder
2780–97	E4	2-4-0	18	ex-GER Class T26
2808–85 (with gaps)	C1	4-4-2	17	ex-GNR C1 (large boiler)
2900–03/08–10/12/14–25	C4	4-4-2	20	ex-GCR Class 8B
2933/37	C6	4-4-2	2	
2954–95 (with gaps)	C7	4-4-2	14	Ex-NER Class Z or V2
3000–3199	O7	2-8-0	200	Renumbered 90000–90100, 90422–90520 by BR
3200–43 (with gaps)	Q4	0-8-0	34	
3250–3339	Q5	0-8-0	77	
3340–3459	Q6	0-8-0	120	
3460–3474	Q7	0-8-0	15	
3475–86/88–89/91/93–94	O3	2-8-0	17	Formerly Class O1
3554	O6	2-8-0	1	Further 67 engines on loan to LMS; became BR 48705–72
3570–3920 (with gaps)	O4	2-8-0	278	
3571–3901 (with gaps)	O1	2-8-0	51	O4 rebuilt by Thompson
3921–3987	ex-GNR Class O2	2-8-0	67	41 built by LNER
4105–63 (with gaps)	J3	0-6-0	33	ex-GNR Class J4
4109–67 (with gaps)	J4	0-6-0	8	ex-GNR Class J5
4170–4279	J6	0-6-0	110	ex-GNR Class J22
4280–4453	J11	0-6-0	174	
4460–4535	J35	0-6-0	70	
4536–4639	J37	0-6-0	104	
4640–74	J19	0-6-0	35	
4675–99	J20	0-6-0	25	
4700–4988	J39	0-6-0	289	
5002–14	J1	0-6-0	11	ex-GNR Class J21
5015–23	J2	0-6-0	9	ex-GNR Class J21
5025–5123	J21	0-6-0	83	
5126–5209	J10	0-6-0	78	
5210–5346	J36	0-6-0	123	
5350–5479	J15	0-6-0	127	
5480–99	J5	0-6-0	20	ex-GNR Class J4
5500–89	J17	0-6-0	89	
5600–44	J24	0-6-0	34	
5645–5728	J25	0-6-0	76	
5730–5779	J26	0-6-0	50	
5780–5894	J27	0-6-0	115	ex-NER Class P3; 10 built by LNER
5900–34	J38	0-6-0	35	
6480/81	ex-NER Class ES1 electric	Bo-Bo	2	Renumbered 26500–01 by BR
6490–99	EB1 electric	Bo-Bo	10	Renumbered 26502–11 by BR
6701	EM1 electric	Bo+Bo	1	Became British Rail Class 76; on loan to Nederlandse Spoorwegen; renumbered 26000 by BR
6999	EE1 electric	2-Co-2	1	Renumbered 26600 by BR; never used
7093–94	F7	2-4-2T	2	
7097–7100	F1	2-4-2T	3	
7104–7113	F2	2-4-2T	9	
7114–50	F3	2-4-2T	15	
7151–87	F4	2-4-2T	37	
7188–7219	F5	2-4-2T	30	
7220–39	F6	2-4-2T	22	first 2 reclassified as F5 during 1948
7240–7349	G5	0-4-4T	110	
7350–99	C12	4-4-2T	49	ex-GNR Class C2
7400–39	C13	4-4-2T	40	
7440–51	C14	4-4-2T	12	
7452–81	C15	4-4-2T	30	
7482–7502	C16	4-4-2T	21	
7600–81 (with gaps)	V1	2-6-2T	78	
in range 7600–81 (with gaps)	V3	2-6-2T	14	Formerly Class V1
8000–03	DES1 diesel	0-6-0DE	4	Became British Rail Class D3/9; renumbered 15000–03 by BR
8004	DES2 diesel	0-6-0DE	1	Became British Rail Class D3/4; renumbered 15004 by BR
8006–80	J94	0-6-0ST	74	
8081	Y5	0-4-0ST	1	
8082–83	Y6	0-4-0Tram	2	
8088–89	Y7	0-4-0T	2	ex-NER Class H; 1 built by LNER
8090–91	Y8	0-4-0T	2	
8092–8124	Y9	0-4-0ST	33	
8125–29	Y4	0-4-0T	5	
8130–53	Y1	0-4-0VBT	15	plus another 9 in departmental stock
8154–85	Y3	0-4-0VBT	28	plus another 3 in departmental stock
8186–87	Y10	0-4-0VBT	2	
8188–89	Y11	0-4-0PM	2	
8190–91	Z4	0-4-2T	2	
8192–93	Z5	0-4-2T	2	
8200–03	J62	0-6-0ST	4	
8204–10	J63	0-6-0ST	7	
8211–15	J65	0-6-0ST	4	
8216–26	J70	0-6-0Tram	11	ex-GER Class C53
8230–8316 (with gaps)	J71	0-6-0T	81	
8317/19	J55	0-6-0ST	2	ex-GNR Class J16
8320–54	J88	0-6-0T	35	
8355–64	J73	0-6-0T	10	
8365	J75	0-6-0T	1	
8366/68	J60	0-6-0T	2	
8370–88	J66	0-6-0T	18	ex-GER Class J66; plus 1 from Mersey Railway
8390–8441 (with gaps)	J77	0-6-0T	46	
8442–81	J83	0-6-0T	39	
8484/88–89	J93	0-6-0T	3	
8490–8628 (with gaps)	J67	0-6-0T	45	
8491–8636 (with gaps)	J69	0-6-0T	89	
8638–66	J68	0-6-0T	29	
8667–69	J92	0-6-0CT	3	crane tank engines
8670–8754	J72	0-6-0T	85	ex-NER E1; 10 built by LNER
8757–8889	J52	0-6-0ST	132	ex-GNR Class J13
8890–8991	J50	0-6-0T	102	ex-GNR J23; 62 built by LNER (30 rebuilt from J51)
9000	L1	2-6-4T	1	Thompson design; renumbered 67701–15 by BR
9050–69	L3	2-6-4T	19	
9070–71	L2	2-6-4T	2	
9076–77	M2	0-6-4T	2	
9089	N12	0-6-2T	1	
9090–9109	N10	0-6-2T	20	
9110–19	N13	0-6-2T	10	
9120/24–25	N14	0-6-2T	3	
9126–9224	N15	0-6-2T	99	
9225–47	N4	0-6-2T	22	
9250–9370	N5	0-6-2T	121	
9371–9401	N8	0-6-2T	30	
9410–11/13–15/18–29	N9	0-6-2T	17	
9430–37/39-85	ex-GNR Class N1	0-6-2T	55	
9490-9596	ex-GNR Class N2	0-6-2T	107	47 built by LNER
9600–9733	N7	0-6-2T	134	
9770–89	A7	4-6-2T	20	
9791–99	A6	4-6-2T	9	
9800–42	A5	4-6-2T	43	
9850–94	A8	4-6-2T	45	Formerly Class H1
9900–05	S1	0-8-4T	6	
9910-22	T1	4-8-0T	13	ex-NER Class X; 5 built by LNER
9925–37	Q1	0-8-0T	13	Thompson design
9999	U1	2-8-0+0-8-2	1	
10000	W1	4-6-4	1	Renumbered 60700 by BR

== See also ==
- List of GWR locomotives as of 31 December 1947
- List of LMS locomotives as of 31 December 1947
- List of SR locomotives as of 31 December 1947
- Steam locomotives of British Railways
