= Darlington TMD =

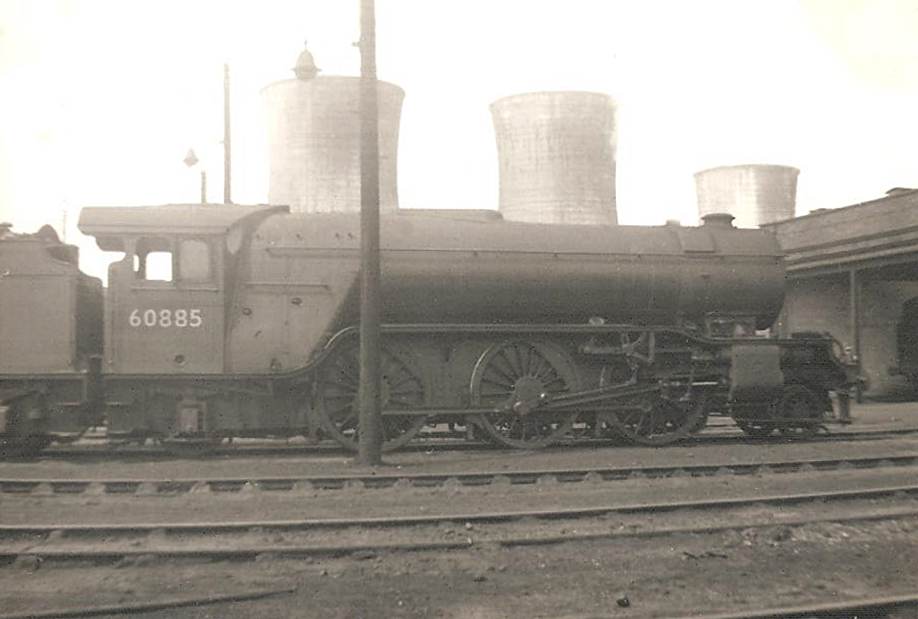
- LNER Class V2, 60885, outside Darlington locomotive shed in 1964
- Interactive map of Darlington TMD

Location
- Location: Darlington, United Kingdom
- Coordinates: 54.5319°N 1.5430°W
- OS grid: NZ295152

Characteristics
- Owner: British Rail
- Depot code: 51A (1948-1973); DN (1973-1991)
- Type: Diesel

History
- Opened: 1840s
- Closed: 26 March 1966 (closed to steam)
- Original: Great North of England Railway
- Pre-grouping: North Eastern Railway
- Post-grouping: LNER

Darlington TMD was a railway traction maintenance depot situated in Darlington, England. The depot code was 51A during the steam era and DN later on. It had several locations. It mainly provided for Teesside freight and local passenger routes to Penrith, Richmond and Saltburn.

== History ==
The main depot had an 1866 roundhouse, a 9-track 1940 shed and a 1958 diesel depot.

=== Diesel ===
Darlington diesel depot was opened by Richard Nugent, MP on 17 September 1957. It was situated just north of Bank Top station on the east of the main line, and was linked to the main shed on the west by a 6 feet (1.8 m) wide, 250 feet (76 m) long, tubular steel footbridge. It had a 4-car long, 3-road running shed and a heated, enclosed, 4-car long, 2-road repair shop. Concrete frames supported brick walls and a roof with 70% glazing. 27 12 inches (300 mm) extractor fans cleared fumes. Four fuelling points were fed from a 7,000 imp gal (32,000 L; 8,400 US gal) tank. The washing plant had four pairs of rotating rag flails. A 2-storey block provided for 130 staff. Internal walls were of fluted asbestos sheets, aluminium-faced asbestos boards and glass. The brick stores block south of the repair shop had an oil-fired boiler in the basement. Since the 1980s the former site has been planted

=== Other sheds ===
There were also three other sheds.

==== 1825 ====
In 1825 a shed served the Stockton and Darlington Railway near North Rd.

==== 1840s ====
Darlington Civic Trust's application to English Heritage to list the derelict shed, between Haughton Road and Dumfries Street, following a developer's request to demolish it, resulted in a Grade II* listing from 9 January 2008. The listing describes a 2-bay red brick shed with stone dressings, corrugated asbestos roof, timber ventilator, a Queen Post Roof and the remains of a fireplace, possibly a small forge.

The Civic Trust said it was built by the Great North of England Railway and dated from 1841, which is when that line opened. However, an alternative view is that it was a two-road engine shed, big enough to house four of the first main line steam engines, built by the Newcastle & Darlington Junction Railway when it opened in 1844. The Tithe map of 1847 confirms the building in this position. The listing notes that the first trains to run on the 1841 line used locomotives borrowed or purchased from the Stockton and Darlington. It also says, The architect is uncertain but it is thought to be George Townsend Andrews of York, architect of the first York Station. While this cannot be confirmed the balance of evidence supports this view as Andrews is confirmed as a prolific designer of very many railway buildings in the area including stations, goods stations and engine sheds during this period including work for the Great North of England Railway. The alternative view is that it was, Designed by George Hudson's friend, George Townsend Andrews. That view is supported by the building being in Andrews' style. It is believed to have been altered or rebuilt in 1854.

==== 1861 ====
An 1861. 4-road, 12-engine shed also survives in Whessoe Rd, designed by William Peachey in the angle between the S&D main line and the track serving North Road Works, into which it was merged.

== Steam ==
In 1949 Darlington MPD had 138 locos (including (4 LMS Ivatt Class 2 2-6-0, 1 A2, 17 A5, 14 B1, 2 C7 , 3 G5, 10 J21, 12 J25, 37 J39, 10 J71, 4 J72, 12 J77, 10 J94, 3 L1, 5 N9, Q5, 2 V2)) allocated to it. By 1961 it was down to 68 steam locos (including 2 A3, 9 B1, 15 J94, 11 K1, 1 V2, 12 WD) and 27 diesel shunters.

=== Steam Sub-Sheds ===
Darlington had several sub-sheds, some of which had sub-sheds of their own. Darlington's sub-shed was Middleton-in-Teesdale (to 1957)

- 51B 1950–1958 Newport [transferred to Thornaby]
- 51C 1950–1967 West Hartlepool
- 51D 1950–1958 Middlesbrough [Sub-shed Guisborough (to 1954)] [transferred to Thornaby]
- 51E 1950–1959 Stockton [transferred to Thornaby in 1959]
- 51F 1950–1965 West Auckland [Sub-shed Wearhead (to 1954)]
- 51G 1950–1959 Haverton Hill [transferred to Thornaby in 1959]
- 51H 1950–1958 Kirkby Stephen [Became 12E]
- 51J 1950–1963 Northallerton [Sub-shed Leyburn (to 1954)]
- 51K 1950–1958 Saltburn
- 51L 1958–1973 Thornaby
