= NER Class Z =

Class of 50 British 4-4-2 locomotives, later LNER class C7

NER Class Z LNER Class C7
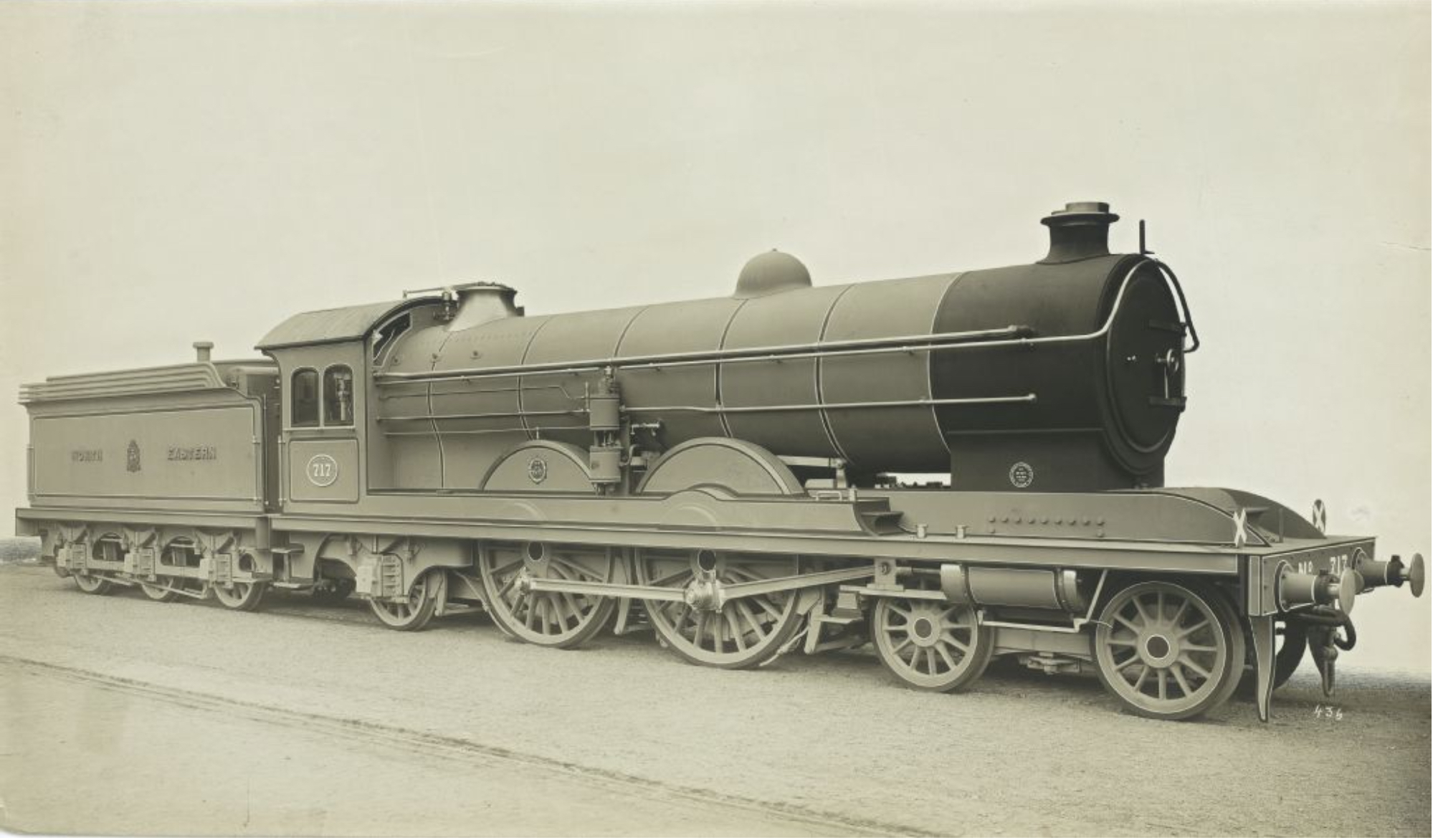
Type and origin
- Power type: Steam
- Designer: Vincent Raven
- Builder: North British Locomotive Co.
- Build date: 1911–1918
- Total produced: 50
Specifications
- Configuration
  - Whyte: 4-4-2
- Gauge: 1,435 mm (4 ft 8 1/2 in)
- Leading dia.: 3 ft 7 1/4 in (1.099 m)
- Driver dia.: 6 ft 10 in (2.083 m)
- Trailing dia.: 4 ft (1.219 m)
- Tender wheels: 3 ft 9 1/4 in (1.149 m)
- Wheelbase: 53 ft 3 9/10 in (16.253 m)
  - Engine: 29 ft 6 in (8.992 m)
  - Tender: 12 ft 8 in (3.861 m)
- Length: 39 ft 11 in (12.2 m)
- Width: 8 ft 5 1/2 in (2.6 m)
- Height: 13 ft 3 in (4.0 m)
- Axle load: 20 4/5 t (20,800 kg)
- Loco weight: 79 4/5 t (79,800 kg)
- Tender weight: 46 3/5 t (46,600 kg)
- Total weight: 125 3/10 t (125,300 kg)
- Fuel type: Coal
- Firebox
  - Grate area: 27 sq ft (2.5 m^{2})
- Boiler
  - Diameter: 5 ft 6 in (1.676 m)
  - Small tubes: 90 x 2 in
  - Large tubes: 24 x 5.25 in
- Boiler pressure: 175 psi (1,210 kPa)
- Heating surface
  - Firebox: 185 sq.ft.
  - Tubes: 763.9 sq.ft.
  - Flues: 534.5 sq.ft.
- Superheater
  - Heating area: 392 sq.ft. (24 x 1.1 in)
- Cylinders: 3
- Cylinder size: 16.5 in × 26 in (420 mm × 660 mm)
- Valve gear: C7/1: Stephenson; C7/2: Lentz rotary cam
- Valve type: C7/1: Piston valves; C7/2: poppet valves
Career
- Operators: North Eastern Railway; London and North Eastern Railway; British Railways
- Class: NER Z, LNER C7
- Withdrawn: 1943–1948
- Disposition: Two rebuilt into Class C9 (see below), remainder scrapped

LNER Class C9
Type and origin
- Power type: Steam
- Designer: Nigel Gresley
- Rebuild date: 1931
- Number rebuilt: 2
Specifications
- Configuration
  - Whyte: 4-4-2
- Gauge: 1,435 mm (4 ft 8 1/2 in)
- Leading dia.: 3 ft 7 1/4 in (1.099 m)
- Coupled dia.: 6 ft 10 in (2.083 m)
- Trailing dia.: 3 ft 8 in (1.118 m)
- Tender wheels: 3 ft 8 in (1.118 m)
- Wheelbase: 55 ft 7 in (16.942 m)
- Axle load: 20 1/20 t (20,000 kg)
- Total weight: 135 2/5 t (135,400 kg)
- Fuel type: Coal
- Firebox
  - Grate area: 2,317 3/5 sq ft (215.312 m^{2})
- Boiler
  - Diameter: 5 ft 7 1/4 in (1.708 m)
  - Small tubes: 143 x 2 in
  - Large tubes: 24 x 5.25 in
- Boiler pressure: 200 psi (1,400 kPa)
- Heating surface
  - Firebox: 203 sq.ft.
  - Tubes: 1,178.4 sq.ft.
  - Flues: 519.2 sq.ft.
- Superheater
  - Heating area: 417 sq.ft. (24 x 1.2 in)
- Cylinders: 3
- Cylinder size: 16.5 in × 26 in (420 mm × 660 mm)
- Valve gear: Stephenson
Career
- Operators: London and North Eastern Railway
- Class: C9
- Number in class: 2
- Numbers: 727, 2171
- Withdrawn: 1942–1943
- Disposition: Both scrapped

The NER Class Z (LNER Class C7) was an 4-4-2 "Atlantic" class of locomotives designed by Vincent Raven. It was introduced in 1911.

== Construction and early life ==
Vincent Raven had been appointed Chief Mechanical Engineer of the North Eastern Railway (NER) in June 1910. His predecessor, Wilson Worsdell, had introduced three-cylinder simple-expansion locomotives to the NER with the Class X 4-8-0T, ten of which were built in 1909–10 for heavy shunting. One of Raven's first designs was another three-cylinder locomotive, the Class Y 4-6-2T, twenty of which were built in 1910–11 for hauling coal trains from collieries to ports. The success of these two designs convinced Raven to design a three-cylinder locomotive to haul express passenger trains. Worsdell's two-cylinder Class V 4-4-2 were handling the principal East Coast expresses, and Raven combined the 4-4-2 wheel arrangement with three cylinders to produce his new design. The coupled wheels were of 6 ft 10 in (2.08 m) diameter with a coupled wheelbase of 7 ft 7 in (2.31 m) within a total locomotive wheelbase of 29 ft 6 in (8.99 m). The three cylinders measured 16 1/2 in (420 mm) bore by 26 in (660 mm) stroke driving the leading coupled axle, fed by piston valves which were themselves operated by Stephenson's link motion. The cylinders and their valve chests were made as a single casting.

Originally classified NER Class V2, the first 20 were built in 1911 by the North British Locomotive Company. This was the first time since the 1880s (Note: The 38 and 59 classes ordered by Alexander McDonnell, delivered in 1884–85) that the NER had used a private contractor, and was necessary because Gateshead works had stopped building new locomotives in 1910 and Darlington Works was fully booked. Ten of these locomotives were saturated and the others were superheated. The classification V2 was soon amended, with the saturated locomotives becoming Class Z, and the superheated locomotives Z1. A further thirty of Class Z1 were built at Darlington Works in 1914–18, and in June 1914, Class Z1 was redesignated Class Z.

At the end of 1920, the fifty locomotives were based at principal main-line depots: there were 21 at Gateshead, fourteen at York, seven at Tweedmouth, five at Heaton, and three at Leeds (Neville Hill). By the 1923 Grouping, four were at Haymarket (Edinburgh). At these depots they shared duties with the other NER Atlantics, classes V and 4CC: these included the principal expresses on the East Coast Main Line: York–Newcastle and Newcastle–Edinburgh, together with the through services from Liverpool (Lime Street) to Newcastle, which were hauled by a locomotive of the London and North Western Railway between Leeds and Liverpool.

All fifty passed to the London and North Eastern Railway (LNER) at the 1923 Grouping, they retained their NER numbers but were now known as LNER Class C7. To begin with, they continued on the same duties, but in 1924–25, the LNER took delivery of forty Class A1 4-6-2, of which ten were allocated to Gateshead and five each to Haymarket and Heaton. At these depots they took over some of the duties previously handled by the ex-NER Atlantics, for which other duties were found, resulting in a certain amount of reallocation: in December 1929, there were nineteen C7s at York, sixteen at Gateshead, seven at Heaton, five at Tweedmouth and three at Haymarket. More 4-6-2s (of classes A3 and A4) were built between 1930 and 1938 bringing about further changes in allocation – the September 1939 allocation of Class C7 was 26 at York, ten at Gateshead, four at Heaton, three each at Neville Hill and Tweedmouth, and one each at Haymarket and St Margaret's (Edinburgh); the two C9s were at Tweedmouth.

== Variations ==
From the very start the class was used for comparative trials and experiments.

=== Superheaters ===
When the first twenty locomotives were ordered, the benefits of superheated steam were still being evaluated. Accordingly, the new class was used for a direct comparison – ten worked with saturated steam, whilst the boilers of the remaining ten were equipped with Schmidt superheaters. Other differences between the two groups included the cylinder bore and boiler pressure. The saturated locomotives had a cylinder bore of 15 1/2 in (390 mm) and a boiler pressure of 175 lbf/in^{2} (1,210 kPa), while the superheated locomotives had a cylinder bore of 16 1/2 in (420 mm) and a boiler pressure of 160 lbf/in^{2} (1,100 kPa). It did not take long for the advantages of superheating to become apparent, including fuel savings. Consequently, when additional locomotives were ordered, they were also equipped with Schmidt superheaters. During 1914–15, the first ten locomotives were similarly converted. However, the cylinder bore and boiler pressure of the superheated locomotives were adjusted to match those of the first ten. As the original boilers wore out, replacements were constructed; those made from 1931 used Robinson superheaters instead of Schmidt ones.

=== Uniflow cylinders ===
The last of the 50 locos, No. 2212 was built with Stumpf Uniflow cylinders. This arrangement had been used on LNER Class B15 No. 825 with an untidy result, however the arrangement had been tidied up for No. 2212. Double-length cylinders were required, thus a longer front bogie and smaller wheels were fitted. This arrangement, although requiring special attention (as with No. 825) was used until 1934, when No. 2212 was fitted with normal cylinders and Lentz rotary cam poppet valves.

=== Feedwater heaters ===
Normally, a locomotive boiler is fed with cold water from the tender or tank and must be heated from ambient temperature to its boiling point in order to make steam. When the steam has been used in the cylinders, it is exhausted through the chimney, and the heat that it contains is lost. Some engineers had tried different systems for extracting heat from the exhaust steam in order to pre-heat the boiler feedwater, and so use less fuel in the firebox.

The Dabeg feedwater heater was tried out by the LNER on two locomotives in the 1920s, and C7 no. 2163 was one of those selected for fitment (the other being Class O2 no. 3500). A heat exchanger was mounted on the left-hand side of the locomotive above the footplate, through which exhaust steam was passed. A pump driven from the rear coupled wheel pumped cold water from the tender through the heat exchanger and a grease separator before being forced into the boiler. The equipment was fitted to no. 2163 in 1928 and removed in 1937.

The A.C.F.I. system was French, and the LNER made more extensive use of it – several Class B12 locomotives were given this equipment, as were two Class C7, nos. 728 and 2206. The equipment was fitted to these in 1928, and although the trial officially ended in 1937, the equipment was not removed from the two Class C7 until 1941–42.

=== Boosters ===
In early 1931, Gresley rebuilt Nos. 727 and 2171 (which were entering Darlington for repairs) with an articulated booster bogie, thus making them technically 4-4-4-4s. However the articulated bogie was considered split between the loco and tender to simplify classification. Originally the booster gearing was 1.5:1, but the trials on C1 No. 4419 (also having boosters) showed that the booster's help was practically nonexistent above 25 mph (40 km/h), meaning that they were useless for expresses, which needed a speed of at least 30 mph (48 km/h).

After this, Darlington recommended that the booster gearing be changed to 1:1. This required larger cylinders to supply the same tractive effort, which required the boiler to operate at 200 psi (1,400 kPa) (25 psi (170 kPa) higher than the C7s, which were 175 psi (1,210 kPa)). There were some concerns about engaging the booster at higher speeds, however the unitary 1:1 gearing was considered to make this easier. The boilers were "Diagram 100" boilers (the ones used on the B17s), and followed Doncaster practices, rather than Darlington practices (which was used on the standard C7s). They also had Robinson superheaters, rather than Schmidt ones. The boosters were manufactured by J. Stone & Co, and the geared axles by David Brown & Co.

The growing amount of Gresley A1s, A3s and A4s made the experiment redundant (seeing the A4s were scheduled to climb Cockburnspath hauling a 312 tons load at an average speed of 55 mph [89 km/h]).

=== Lentz valves ===
In 1933, Gresley rebuilt no. 732 with new cylinders of the same type as used on Class D49/2. These measured 17 by 26 in (430 by 660 mm) and had poppet valves actuated by Lentz rotary cam valve gear, which provided five different cut-off settings for forward running, and two for reverse. The modifications required a new crank axle and new bogie having smaller wheels, which was mounted further forwards. This locomotive also had other modifications, and was designated Class C7/2, the unmodified locomotives being reclassified C7/1. In 1934, no. 2212 (the former Uniflow locomotive) was similarly modified, except that the valve gear allowed seven different settings for forward running, and two for reverse. However, rebuilding took some time, and No. 2212 did not return to service until January 1936.

== Withdrawal ==
=== Withdrawal of the C7 ===
By the late 1930s, the new V2s were taking away the duties of the C7s. Had World War 2 not intervened, withdrawal would have started before 1940. However withdrawal was pushed back, only starting in August 1943. Withdrawal was quick, however, with only 14 surviving to nationalization. Within a year, British Railways withdrew the remaining C7s, with none surviving into preservation.

=== Withdrawal of the C9 ===
Their boilers were considered non-standard (compared to the C7s), thus they were withdrawn and scrapped in April 1942 (2171) and January 1943 (727), before the first standard C7 was withdrawn.

== Loco details ==
List of NER Class Z locomotives
NER/LNER 1924 number	LNER 1946 number	BR number	Built date	Withdrawal date	Notes
706	(2950)	—	07/1911	12/1946	
709	(2951)	—	07/1911	03/1946	
710	(2952)	—	07/1911	02/1944	
714	(2953)	—	07/1911	01/1944	
716	2954	(62954)	07/1911	26/06/1948	
717	(2955)	—	08/1911	04/1944	
718	2956	—	08/1911	06/1946	
719	(2957)	—	08/1911	04/1944	
720	2958	—	08/1911	08/11/1947	
721	(2959)	—	09/1911	02/1944	
722	2960	—	08/1911	03/1947	
727	—	—	09/1911	01/1943	Rebuilt as C9 in 11/1931
728	(2961)	—	09/1911	11/1945	
729	(2962)	—	09/1911	11/1945	
732	2963	—	10/1911	12/1946	Rebuilt with Lentz rotary cams-operated valve gear in December 1933
733	(2964)	—	10/1911	08/1945	
734	(2965)	—	10/1911	09/1944	
735	(2966)	—	10/1911	06/1945	
736	(2967)	—	11/1911	04/1946	
737	(2968)	—	12/1911	12/1945	
2163	(2969)	—	05/1914	01/1946	
2164	2970	(62970)	05/1914	27/12/1948	Last withdrawn C7
2165	2971	—	06/1914	02/1947	
2166	2972	(62972)	06/1914	30/08/1948	
2167	2973	(62973)	06/1914	26/06/1948	
2168	2974	—	06/1914	05/1947	
2169	2975	(62975)	06/1914	10/07/1948	
2170	(2976)	—	06/1914	08/1943	First C7 withdrawn
2171	—	—	07/1914	04/1942	Rebuilt as C9 in 12/1931
2172	(2977)	—	08/1914	12/1944	
2193	2978	(62978)	12/1914	30/08/1948	
2194	(2979)	—	12/1914	09/1944	
2195	2980	—	12/1914	06/1947	
2196	2981	(62981)	02/1915	10/07/1948	
2197	2982	(62982)	02/1915	24/07/1948	
2198	2983	(62983)	03/1915	24/07/1948	
2199	(2984)	—	03/1915	06/1944	
2200	(2985)	—	03/1915	04/1946	
2201	2986	—	04/1915	09/1947	
2202	(2987)	—	05/1915	10/1943	
2203	2988	(62988)	06/1915	24/07/1948	
2204	2989	(62988)	06/1915	30/08/1948	
2205	(2990)	—	11/1916	02/1945	
2206	2991	—	11/1916	08/11/1947	
2207	2992	(62992)	01/1917	01/11/1948	
2208	2993	(62993)	02/1917	05/03/1948	
2209	(2994)	—	04/1917	02/1944	
2210	2995	(62995)	05/1917	10/07/1948	
2211	2996	—	06/1917	08/11/1917	
2212	(2997)	—	06/1918	10/1945	Fitted with Uniflow cylinders as built; rebuilt with standard cylinders and Lentz rotary cam-operated valve gear in 1934, returned to service in January 1936

Numbers in parentheses were allocated but not applied.

== See also ==
- NER Class 4.6.2, which was based on the C7s
- NER Class R1, which the C7s were initially based on
- NER Class V and V/09, which the C7s were similar to
