= Vincent Raven =

English railway engineer (1859–1934)

Sir Vincent Litchfield Raven
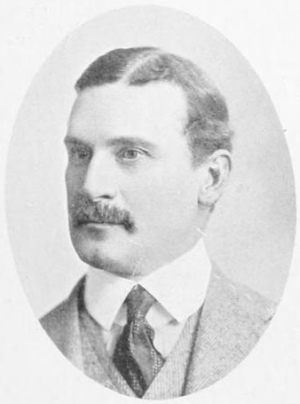
- Born: Vincent Litchfield Raven; 3 December 1859
- Died: 14 February 1934 (aged 74)
- Spouse: Gifford Allan Crichton
- Children: 4
- Engineering career
- Discipline: Mechanical engineering

Sir Vincent Litchfield Raven, KBE (3 December 1859 – 14 February 1934) was an English railway engineer, and was chief mechanical engineer of the North Eastern Railway from 1910 to 1922.

== Biography ==
Vincent Raven was born the son of a clergyman at Great Fransham rectory in Norfolk and educated at Aldenham School in Hertfordshire. In 1877 he began his career with the North Eastern Railway as a pupil of the then Locomotive Superintendent, Edward Fletcher. By 1893 he had achieved the post of Assistant Mechanical Engineer to Wilson Worsdell who was then the Locomotive Superintendent. In this post he was involved for the first time with an electrification project, as the N.E.R. was electrifying the North Tyneside suburban route in 1904. This was a third rail system at 600 volts DC.

== Steam locomotives ==
In 1910 he became Chief Mechanical Engineer on Wilson Worsdell's retirement (The title of the post had changed from Locomotive Superintendent in 1902). Raven developed some of Worsdell's designs for steam locomotives, like the T2 0-8-0 freight locomotive, as well as introducing designs of his own. In particular he favoured a 3-cylinder design with the locomotives driving on the leading coupled axle. This was applied to a series of locomotives, which were Class S3, a mixed traffic 4-6-0 class, Class Y, a 4-6-2T tank engine class for freight work, Class D, a 4-4-4T tank engine class for passenger work, Class Z, a 4-4-2 'Atlantic' class for express passenger work, and the LNER Class A2 4-6-2, a 'Pacific' class for express passenger work. The most memorable of these was the Class Z Atlantics which had a reputation for speed and good riding on East Coast Main Line expresses north of York.

The 3 cylinder principle was also applied to Class X, a heavy freight 4-8-0T tank engine class, but this had a divided drive with the inside cylinder driving the second axle and the outside cylinders driving the third axle. The Class T3 was also three cylinder with all cylinders driving the second axle of this heavy freight 0-8-0.

== Electrification ==
=== Shildon–Newport ===
Raven was a great advocate of electrification, and in 1915, a section of line was electrified between Shildon in the south west Durham Coalfield and Newport, on Teesside, with the intention of improving performance on coal trains from Shildon to Middlesbrough. For this, he introduced electrification at 1500 volts DC with overhead wires. Ten centre cab electric locomotives of 1100 horsepower were built at Darlington Works for this, numbered in a series from 3 to 12 (1 and 2 were a different design of 1902 for the Tyneside electrification at 600 volts DC).

=== York–Newcastle ===
Following the success of the Shildon–Newport scheme, Raven set about planning the electrification of the main line from York to Newcastle, also at 1500 volts DC. Both third rail and overhead power supply systems were considered and some experiments were done with dummy collector shoes fitted to the bogie of a steam locomotive to assess the mechanical performance at speed. In the end, the overhead system was selected.

A prototype passenger loco was built in 1922 at Darlington for this, NER No. 13, which was a new design of 1,800 horsepower (1,300 kW) and a 2-Co-2 (4-6-4) wheel arrangement. Although successfully tested between Newport and Shildon using the overhead power supply, No. 13 was destined to be unlucky as it never did the job for which it was designed. The reorganisation of Britain's railways in 1923 led to the abandonment of the electrification plans by the successor company, the LNER.

=== Decline of electric traction ===
After the grouping, the proposed electrification of the East Coast Main Line was quickly abandoned, although it was electrified by British Rail in the late 1980s. The Shildon–Newport electrification reverted to steam haulage in 1935. Falling traffic levels and the need to replace the overhead equipment were cited as the reasons.

The EF1 electric freight locomotives went into store, and lasted until 1950, when they were all scrapped except No 11. The EE1 express passenger locomotive No 13 was also scrapped in 1950, having spent most of its life in storage, but one of the ES1 shunting locomotives is preserved.

No 11 was rebuilt for use on the Woodhead route of the Manchester–Sheffield–Wath electric railway and re-classified EB1. It was never used on this scheme, but found work as a shunter at Ilford until 1964 when it was scrapped.

== Steam survival ==
The steam classes fared better, most lasting into nationalisation in 1948. Class Z all were scrapped by the early 1950s. The S3s lasted well, some being rebuilt with different boilers and new cylinders. The class D tank engines were rebuilt by the LNER as 4-6-2 tank engines and lasted into the very early 1960s when they were replaced by diesel units. The freight classes also lasted well, the class Y tanks going before 1960 and the class X and T3 lasting a little longer. The rugged, reliable and simple T2s lasted until the end of steam locomotive use in North East England, in September 1967. they were, along with the Worsdell designed P3s, the last pre-grouping locomotives in use in Britain. Two Raven steam locomotives survive in preservation, a T2 No 2238 (currently in running order as No. 63395 in British Railways paintwork) and No. 901, the pioneer T3, the only surviving loco of Raven's 3 cylinder design.

== World War I and after ==
At the direction of the prime minister, David Lloyd George, in September 1915 Raven was appointed as superintendent of the Royal Arsenal, Woolwich in order to oversee the production of munitions for the Great War. Within three months, Lloyd George was able to report to the House of Commons that output had risen by 60 to 80 per cent, despite an increase in the size of the workforce of only 23 per cent. For his efforts, Raven was awarded a knighthood in 1917.

At the Grouping of the railways in 1923, the post of chief mechanical engineer for the London and North Eastern Railway was given to Nigel Gresley of the Great Northern Railway, with Raven becoming a technical adviser. He resigned in 1924 and was appointed to the Royal Commission on New South Wales Government Railways, in company with Sir Sam Fay.

Raven died on 14 February 1934 after heart trouble whilst on holiday with Lady Raven in Felixstowe.

In 1883, Raven married Gifford Allan Crichton, and in the years 1883-9 fathered four children: Constance Gifford, Guendolen Edith, Norman Vincent, and Frederick Gifford. In 1913, Guendolen married Edward Thompson, who would later succeed Nigel Gresley as Chief Mechanical Engineer of the LNER.

== Sources ==
- Everett, Andrew (2006). Visionary Pragmatist: Sir Vincent Raven, North Eastern Railway Locomotive Engineer. Stroud: Tempus Publishing. ISBN 0752439243.
- Grafton, Peter (2005). Sir Vincent Raven and the North Eastern Railway. Oakwood Library of Railway History. Vol. 137. Usk: Oakwood Press. ISBN 085361640X.
- Hoole, Ken (1988). The Electric Locomotives of the North Eastern Railway. Locomotion Papers. Vol. 167. Usk: Oakwood Press. ISBN 0853613672.
- Tuplin, W. A. (1970). North Eastern Steam. London: Allen & Unwin. ISBN 0043850510.

Business positions
Preceded by Wilson Worsdell	Chief Mechanical Engineer of the North Eastern Railway; 1910–1922	Succeeded by Nigel Gresley as Chief Mechanical Engineer, London and North Eastern Railway
Professional and academic associations
Preceded by William Henry Patchell	President of the Institution of Mechanical Engineers; 1925	Succeeded by Sir William Reavell
