= NER Class S1 =

Class of British steam locomotives

NER Class S1 LNER Class B14
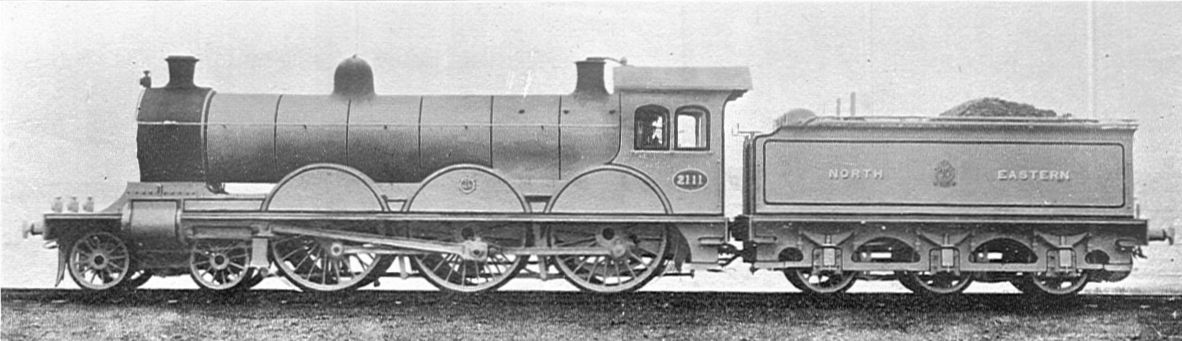
Type and origin
- Power type: Steam
- Designer: Wilson Worsdell
- Build date: 1900-1901
- Total produced: 5
Specifications
- Configuration
  - Whyte: 4-6-0
- Leading dia.: 3 ft 7 1/4 in (1.099 m)
- Driver dia.: 6 ft 8 1/4 in (2.038 m)
- Wheelbase: 27 ft 6 in (8.38 m) engine 12 ft 8 in (3.86 m) tender 51 ft 6 3/4 in (15.716 m) total
- Axle load: 19.5 long tons (19.8 t)
- Loco weight: 67.1 long tons (68.2 t)
- Tender weight: 41.1 long tons (41.8 t)
- Total weight: 108.2 long tons (109.9 t)
- Firebox
  - Grate area: 23 sq ft (2.1 m^{2})
- Boiler: 4 ft 9 in (1.45 m)
- Boiler pressure: 175 psi (1.21 MPa)
- Heating surface
  - Firebox: 120 sq ft (11 m^{2})
  - Tubes: 935 sq ft (86.9 m^{2})
  - Flues: 401 sq ft (37.3 m^{2})
  - Total surface: 1,750 sq ft (163 m^{2})
- Superheater
  - Heating area: 294 sq ft (27.3 m^{2})
- Cylinders: 2 (outside)
- Cylinder size: 20 in × 26 in (510 mm × 660 mm)
- Valve gear: Stephenson
Performance figures
- Tractive effort: 19,310 lbf (85.9 kN)
Career
- Operators: North Eastern Railway, London & North Eastern Railway
- Numbers: 2111-2115
- Withdrawn: 1929-1931
- Disposition: All scrapped

The NER Class S1 (LNER Class B14) was a class of 4-6-0 steam locomotives of the North Eastern Railway. It was designed by Wilson Worsdell and five locomotives were built between 1900 and 1901 at Gateshead works. The S1 was similar to the NER Class S but had larger driving wheels and a higher boiler pressure.

== Modifications ==
Schmidt superheaters and longer smokeboxes were fitted between 1913 and 1917.

== Use ==
When built, the S1s hauled heavy passenger expresses between York, Newcastle, and Edinburgh. Despite their generally high status, they proved to be insufficient with steaming and were seemingly no better than the S Class that came before them. As a result, they were gradually re-allocated onto goods traffic (mainly hauling fish trains) once the North Eastern's R and R1 4-4-0 classes entered regular service.

== Locomotive details ==
List of NER class S1/LNER class B14
Number(NER/LNER)	Built date	Withdrawal date	Notes
2111	31/12/1900	31/7/1929	
2112	30/6/1901	31/5/1931	Last to be withdrawn
2113	30/6/1901	31/10/1930	
2114	30/6/1901	31/10/1930	
2115	31/8/1901	30/6/1929	First to be withdrawn

== Withdrawal ==
All five locomotives were withdrawn between 1929 and 1931 and none were preserved.
