= NER Class R =

Class of British 4-4-0 steam locomotives

NER Class R LNER Class D20
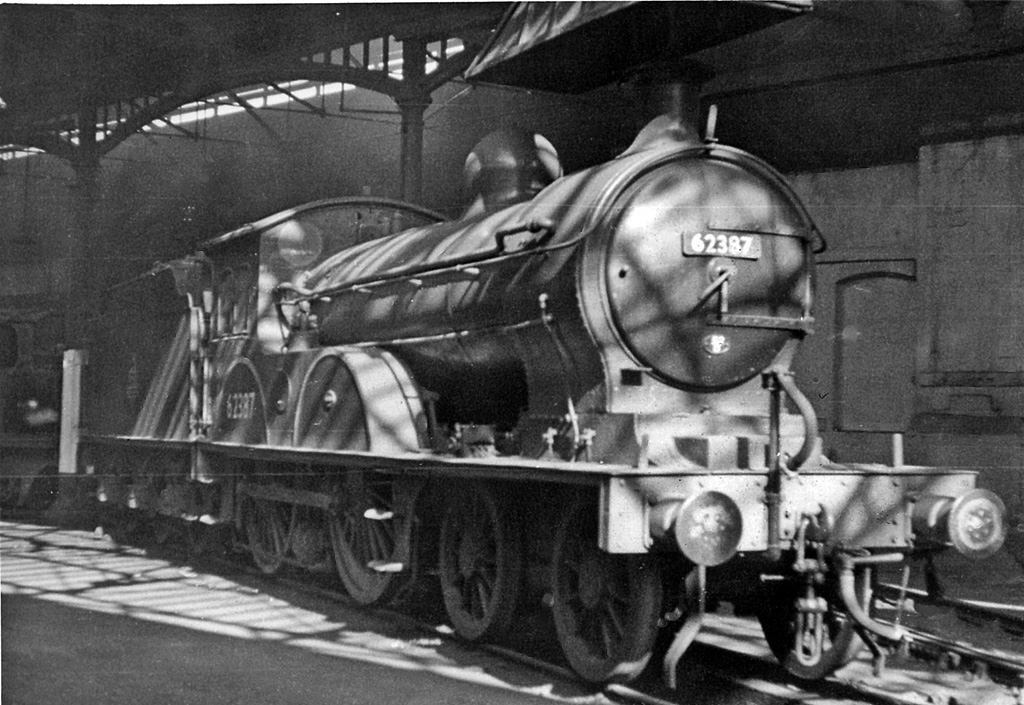
- 1907-built Class R No. 2387, at Gateshead in 1954
Type and origin
- Power type: Steam
- Designer: Wilson Worsdell
- Builder: NER Gateshead
- Build date: 1899–1907
- Total produced: 60
Specifications
- Configuration
  - Whyte: 4-4-0
- Gauge: 4 ft 8 1/2 in (1,435 mm) standard gauge
- Leading dia.: 4 ft 0 in (1.219 m)
- Driver dia.: 6 ft 10 in (2.083 m)
- Wheelbase: 23 ft 9 in (7.24 m) engine 12 ft 8 in (3.86 m) tender 45 ft 10 3/4 in (13.989 m) total
- Axle load: 19.8 long tons (20.1 t; 22.2 short tons)
- Loco weight: D20/1: 54.1 long tons (55.0 t; 60.6 short tons); D20/2: 55.45 long tons (56.34 t; 62.10 short tons)
- Tender weight: 41.2 long tons (41.9 t; 46.1 short tons)
- Total weight: D20/1: 95.3 long tons (96.8 t); D20/2: 96.65 long tons (98.20 t; 108.25 short tons)
- Fuel type: Coal
- Firebox
  - Grate area: 20 sq ft (1.9 m^{2})
- Boiler: 4 ft 9 in (1.45 m) diameter
- Boiler pressure: 200 psi (1.4 MPa) later reduced to 160 psi (1.1 MPa)
- Heating surface
  - Firebox: 139 sq ft (12.9 m^{2})
  - Tubes: 638.7 sq ft (59.34 m^{2})
  - Flues: 292 sq ft (27.1 m^{2})
  - Total surface: 1,318.7 sq ft (122.51 m^{2})
- Superheater
  - Heating area: 204 sq ft (19.0 m^{2})
- Cylinders: two inside
- Cylinder size: 19 in × 26 in (483 mm × 660 mm)
- Valve gear: Stephenson
Performance figures
- Tractive effort: 17,025 lbf (75.73 kN) later reduced to 15,567 lbf (69.25 kN)
Career
- Operators: North Eastern Railway, London and North Eastern Railway, British Railways
- Power class: BR: 2P
- Retired: 1943–1957
- Disposition: All scrapped

The NER Class R (later LNER Class D20) was a class of 4-4-0 steam locomotive designed by Wilson Worsdell for the North Eastern Railway (NER). Sixty locomotives were built at Gateshead works between 1899 and 1907. They proved highly successful on express passenger services and were noted for their exceptional reliability. The class passed to the London and North Eastern Railway (LNER) at the 1923 Grouping, being classified D20, and subsequently to British Railways in 1948. The last was withdrawn in 1957 and none were preserved.

== Background ==
At the end of the 19th century, the East Coast Main Line was experiencing steady traffic growth, resulting in increases in the weight of passenger trains. The Great Northern Railway (GNR), the NER's southern partner on the East Coast route, responded by introducing its first Atlantic locomotives (GNR Class C1) from 1898. In response, the NER proposed an enlarged 4-4-0 design in 1898, which resulted in Wilson Worsdell's Class R.

The NER had also experimented with 4-6-0 locomotives for express work, building the Class S from 1899. However, these steamed poorly due to their small and shallow grates, and the 4-4-0s of Class R quickly proved superior for express passenger duties.

== Design ==
The Class R incorporated design features that Wilson Worsdell had used on previous locomotives such as the Class M1 (LNER D17), but also included several new developments to promote better running. The cylinders were 19 inches (480 mm) in diameter with a 26 inches (660 mm) stroke. Stephenson valve gear was retained, but the locomotives were equipped with newly developed outside admission piston valves fitted below the cylinders. A slide valve version was contemplated but the piston valves proved so successful that it was never built.

The boiler pressure was set at 200 pounds per square inch (1,400 kPa), with the diameter increased to 4 feet 9 inches (1.45 m) and the firebox lengthened to 7 feet (2.1 m). At the time of introduction, this represented the largest boiler built by the NER. All of the original boilers were fitted with Ramsbottom safety valves in a polished brass trumpet cover. All D20 boilers built after 1916 were fitted with two Ross pop safety valves instead.

The locomotives were dual-fitted with Westinghouse air brake cylinders for both the engine and train, and a vacuum ejector for alternative train braking.

== Construction ==
All sixty Class R locomotives were built at Gateshead works in six batches. The initial batch of ten was built in 1899, immediately followed by two further batches of ten each in 1900–1901. After a gap of five years, three additional batches of ten each were built in 1906–1907.

== Superheating ==
The final Class R to be built, No. 1235, was fitted with an experimental Sisterton superheater in an extended smokebox. This was trialled with a dynamometer car in 1908 and again in April 1909, but the Sisterton design proved unsuccessful and was removed shortly afterwards.

Following successful superheating trials by Vincent Raven on his Class Z (LNER C7) Atlantics, NER management accepted superheating and moved to fit it across their express locomotive fleet. The D20s first received superheaters in 1912, with the majority fitted with Schmidt superheaters, though seven received Robinson superheaters instead. Only two locomotives remained unsuperheated at the 1923 Grouping; these were eventually superheated in 1925 and 1929. From 1930, the LNER-standard Robinson superheaters became the norm for replacements. The fitting of superheaters required the smokebox to be extended by approximately 1 foot (0.30 m).

It was standard NER practice to reduce boiler pressure when fitting a superheater; accordingly, the working pressure was reduced to 160 pounds per square inch (1,100 kPa).

== Service ==
=== NER and early LNER ===
The Class R proved to be a great success on express passenger services and were noted for their reliability. The first locomotive, No. 2011, was put to work on a demanding double schedule with two crews, working from Newcastle to Edinburgh and Leeds every day for six days a week. This was maintained with hardly any breaks for two years. No. 2011 accumulated 284,182 miles by the time it received its first general overhaul in March 1903. The remainder of the first batch was operated by single crews but still averaged 163,000 miles before their first general overhauls.

During this early period, the D20s operated the main express passenger services between York, Leeds, Newcastle, and Edinburgh. After 1903, they shared these services with the Class V (LNER C6) Atlantics. When further locomotives were required in 1906, the NER chose to build more D20s rather than the more recent C6 design, a testament to the class's capabilities.

By the 1923 Grouping, the Raven C7 Atlantics were working most of the main express services on the NER network, but 54 D20s remained allocated to main line sheds. During 1924 and 1925, D20s were occasionally seen in the southern sections of the LNER network, hauling excursions to the British Empire Exhibition via Kings Cross.

=== Decline ===
The class saw two significant reductions in status during the 1920s. The first came with the widespread introduction of Gresley A1 Pacifics, which displaced the C7 Atlantics from their express duties to lesser main line services then occupied by the D20s. This was followed by the introduction of the Gresley D49 Hunt/Shire 4-4-0s. These changes led to widespread movement of the D20s away from main line sheds to secondary duties.

By 1935, the D20s were allocated at York (10), Starbeck (8), Tweedmouth (6), Darlington (5), West Hartlepool (4), Scarborough (4), Heaton (3), Gateshead (3), Neville Hill (3), Selby (2), Botanic Gardens Hull (1), Blaydon (1), and Stockton (1).

== Modifications and rebuilding ==
Rather than withdrawing the ageing class, the LNER decided to modernise these capable locomotives. The boiler design was modified in 1934–1935 to use a single plate barrel instead of the original three-ring design, with sixteen extra tubes added to the boiler, providing an additional 87 square feet (8.1 m^{2}) of heating surface.

No. 2020 became the first D20 to receive more extensive modifications in 1936. The piston valves were moved above the cylinders and increased in size to 10 inches (250 mm) diameter, while the valve travel was increased to 6 inches (150 mm). No. 2020 was also converted to left-hand drive and had its Westinghouse pump removed. These rebuilt locomotives were classified D20/2, while the unrebuilt locomotives were reclassified D20/1.

The modification programme stalled until Edward Thompson became the LNER's Chief Mechanical Engineer in 1941. Only three D20/2s were completed in total.

== Numbering ==
At the 1923 Grouping, the sixty Class R locomotives were classified D20 by the LNER. Forty-six D20/1 and three D20/2 locomotives passed to British Railways in 1948 and were numbered 62340–62397 (with gaps).

== Withdrawal ==
The first D20 was withdrawn in 1943. By the time of nationalisation in 1948, 49 locomotives remained in service. The final allocations included Starbeck (10), Selby (9), Alnmouth (7), Botanic Gardens (5), Tweedmouth (3), Blaydon (3), Northallerton (3), West Hartlepool (3), Bridlington (3), Stockton (2), Duns (1), and York (1). The last D20 was withdrawn in 1957 and none were preserved.

== Sources ==
- Fry, E.V. (1966). Locomotives of the L.N.E.R., Part 4: Tender Engines—Classes D13 to D24. Railway Correspondence and Travel Society. OCLC 655777315.
- Hoole, Ken (1979). The 4-4-0 Classes of the North Eastern Railway. Ian Allan. ISBN 0-7110-0921-X.
- Nock, O.S. (1954). Locomotives of the North Eastern Railway. Ian Allan. OCLC 2134293.
