= NER Class P2 =

Class of British steam locomotives (1904–1905)

NER Class P2 LNER Class J26
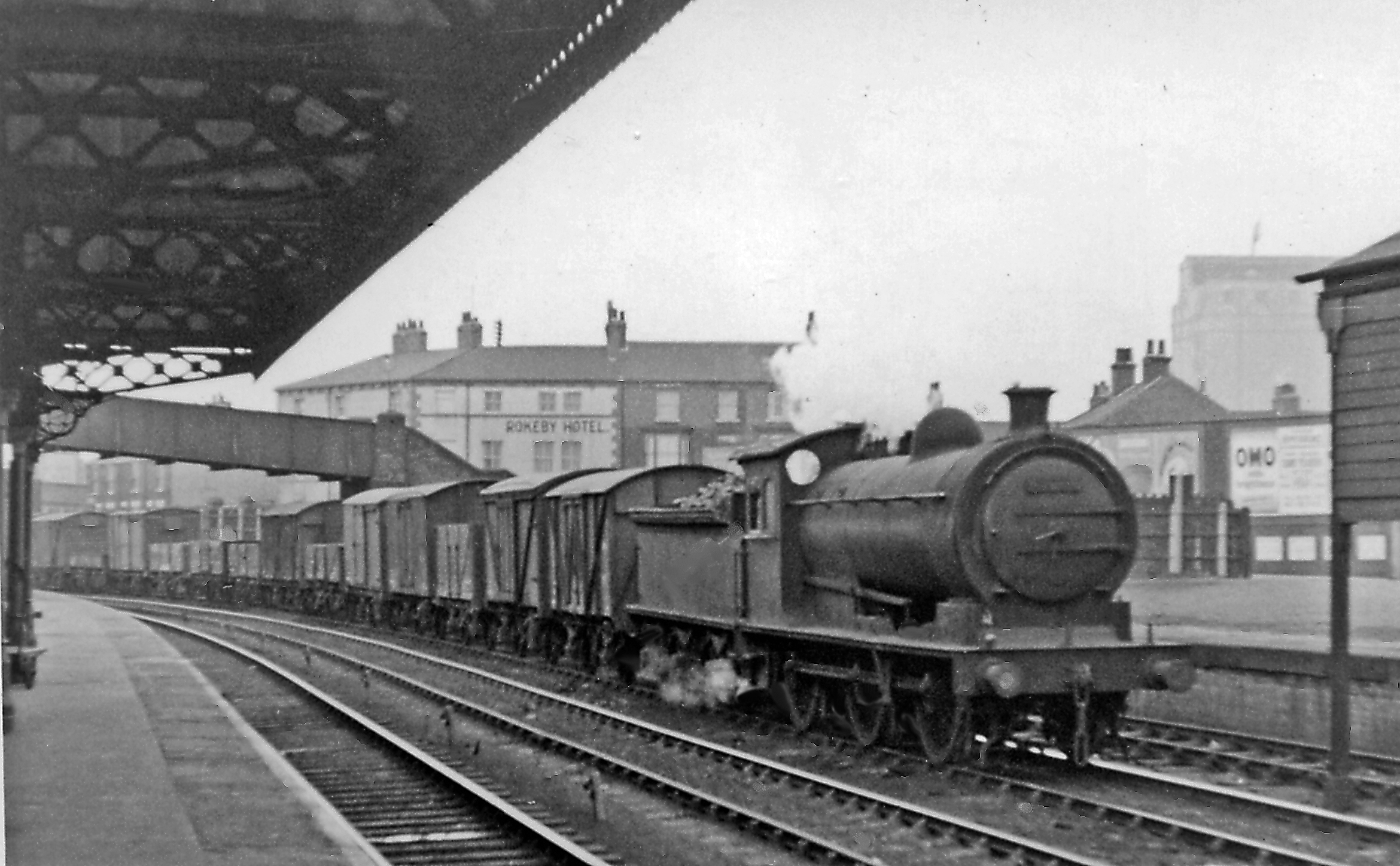
- No. 65774 passes Thornaby station 28 March 1955
Type and origin
- Power type: Steam
- Designer: Wilson Worsdell
- Builder: NER Darlington Works (30); NER Gateshead Works (20)
- Build date: 1904-1905
- Total produced: 50
Specifications
- Configuration
  - Whyte: 0-6-0
- Gauge: 4 ft 8 1/2 in (1,435 mm)
- Driver dia.: 4 ft 7 1/4 in (1.403 m)
- Loco weight: 46.8 long tons (47.6 t)
- Fuel type: coal
- Boiler pressure: 180 psi (1.2 MPa)
- Cylinders: two inside
- Cylinder size: 18 1/2 in × 26 in (470 mm × 660 mm)
Performance figures
- Tractive effort: 24,640 lbf (109.6 kN)
Career
- Numbers: LNER (from 1946): 5730–5779; BR: 65730–65779
- Withdrawn: 1952-1966
- Disposition: All scrapped

The NER Class P2 (LNER Class J26) was a class of 0-6-0 steam locomotives of the North Eastern Railway. All 50 locomotives survived into British Railways ownership in 1948 and their BR numbers were BR 65730-65779 renumbered from LNER 5730-5779 . None survive into preservation. The design is based on the P1 and Class P. All were withdrawn from 1952 to 1966 and scrapped.
