= NER Class T2 =

Class of 120 British 0-8-0 locomotives

NER class T2 LNER class Q6
- An NER Class T2 at Guisborough, 1955
Type and origin
- Power type: Steam
- Designer: Vincent Raven
- Builder: Darlington Works (70); Armstrong Whitworth (50)
- Build date: 1913–1921
- Total produced: 120
Specifications
- Configuration
  - Whyte: 0-8-0
- Gauge: 4 ft 8 1/2 in (1,435 mm) standard gauge
- Driver dia.: 4 ft 7 1/2 in (1.410 m)
- Loco weight: 65.9 long tons (67.0 t; 73.8 short tons)
- Tender weight: 44.1 long tons (44.8 t; 49.4 short tons)
- Fuel type: Coal
- Boiler pressure: 180 psi (1.2 MPa)
- Cylinders: Two, outside
- Cylinder size: 20 in × 26 in (508 mm × 660 mm)
Performance figures
- Tractive effort: 28,800 lbf (128 kN)
Career
- Operators: NER, LNER, BR
- Class: NER: T2, LNER: Q6
- Power class: BR: 6F
- Axle load class: Route availability 6
- Withdrawn: 1960 (1), 1963 - 1967
- Disposition: One preserved, remainder scrapped

The North Eastern Railway Class T2, classified as Class Q6 by the LNER, is a class of 0-8-0 steam locomotive designed for heavy freight, especially for hauling long coal trains to various collieries in the North Eastern region of the UK, with a maximum speed of 40 miles per hour. 120 were built at Darlington Works and Armstrong Whitworth between 1913 and 1921 to the design of Vincent Raven, based on the NER Class T and T1 (LNER Q5). The batch of fifty built by Armstrong Whitworth from 1919 were A-W's first locomotives to be built, after the conversion of their Scotswood works from ordnance to peacetime production.

== Numbering ==
All passed into British Railways ownership in 1948 and they were numbered 63340-63459.

== Disposal ==
63372 was withdrawn in 1960 after an accident. General withdrawals were from 1963 to 1967. 63395 has survived into preservation.

== Preservation ==
One, 2238 (LNER 1946 number 3395; BR 63395) has survived to preservation on the North Yorkshire Moors Railway. It is owned by the North Eastern Locomotive Preservation Group (NELPG), who purchased from Hughes Bolckow scrapyard in 1967, and was withdrawn from service in January 2017 to await boiler overhaul. This overhaul was completed in September 2018, with the locomotive being completed just in time to visit the Severn Valley Railway for their Autumn Steam Gala.

In May 2023, 63395 suffered a cylinder failure while departing from Grosmont with a train, causing major damage.

== Gallery ==
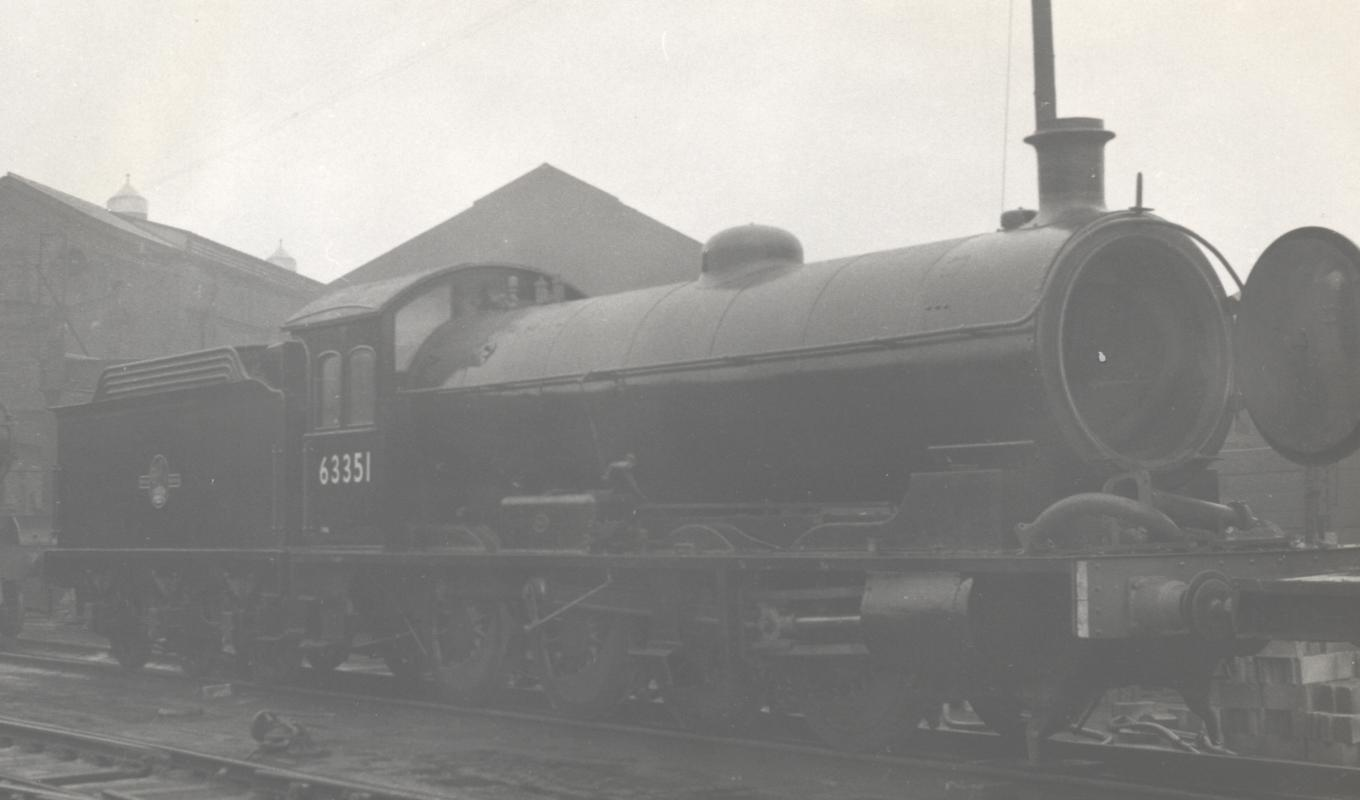
LNER Q6 at Darlington Works after overhaul in March 1959

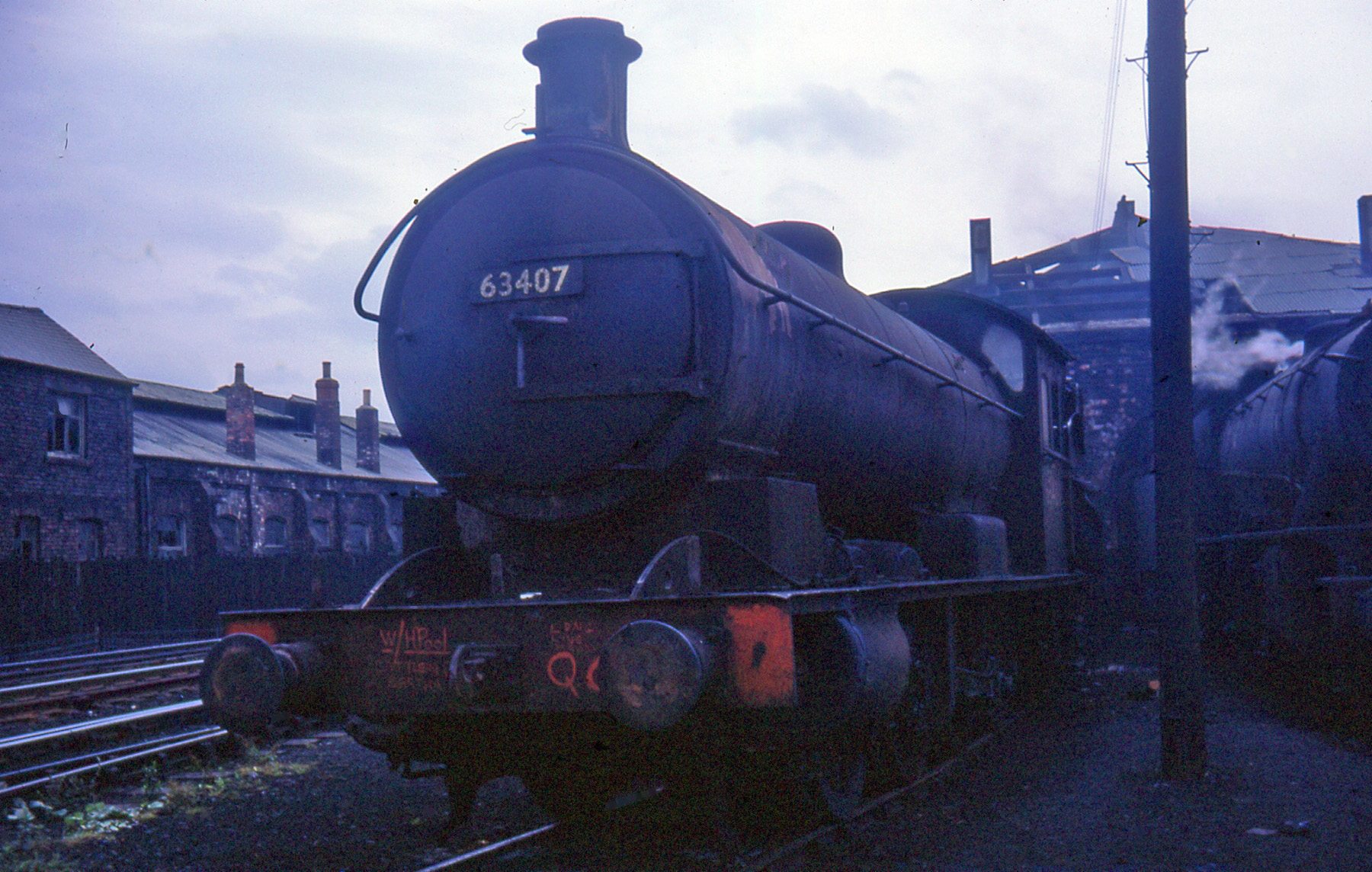
63407 at West Hartlepool shed, June 1967

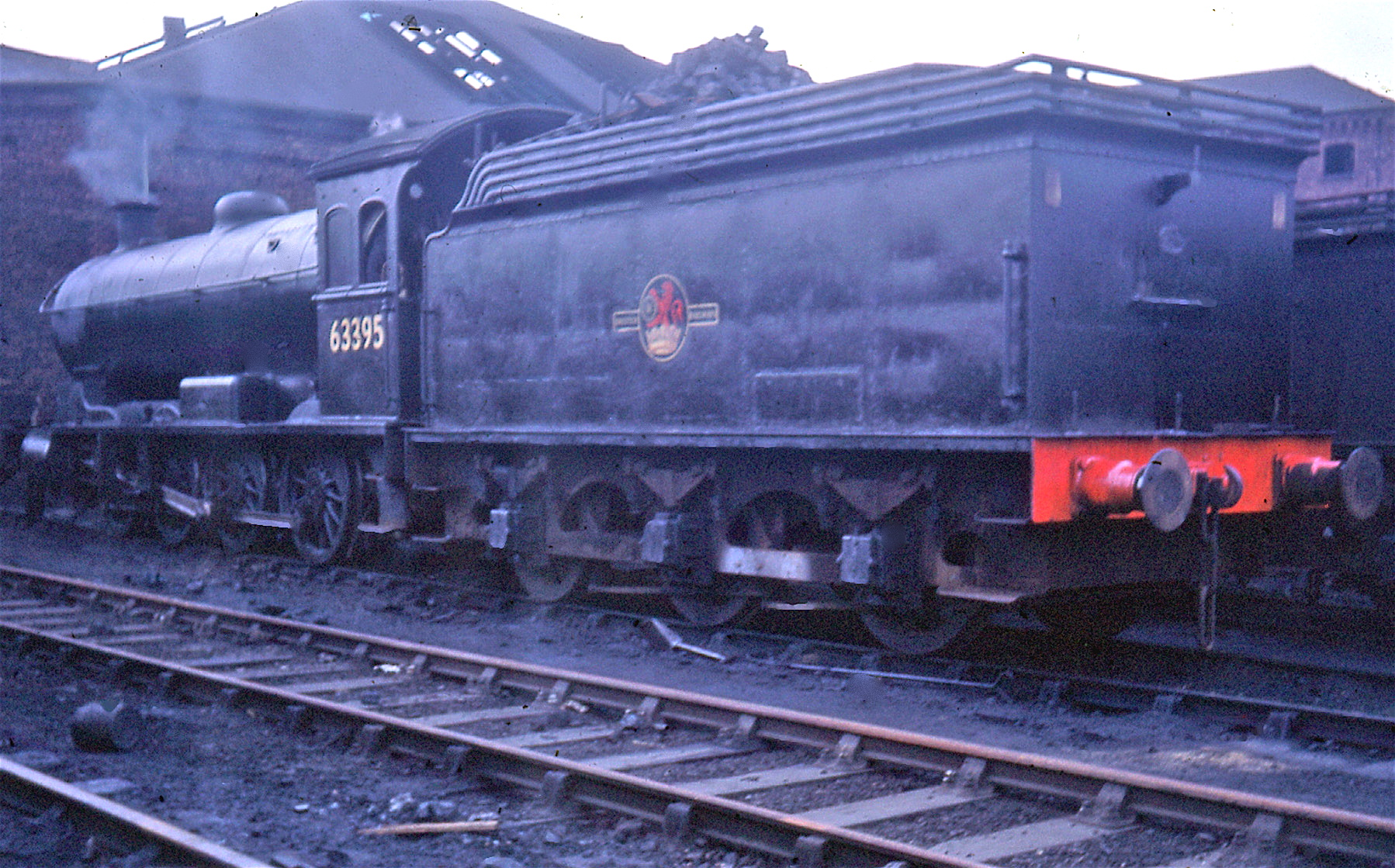
63395 at Sunderland shed, June 1967

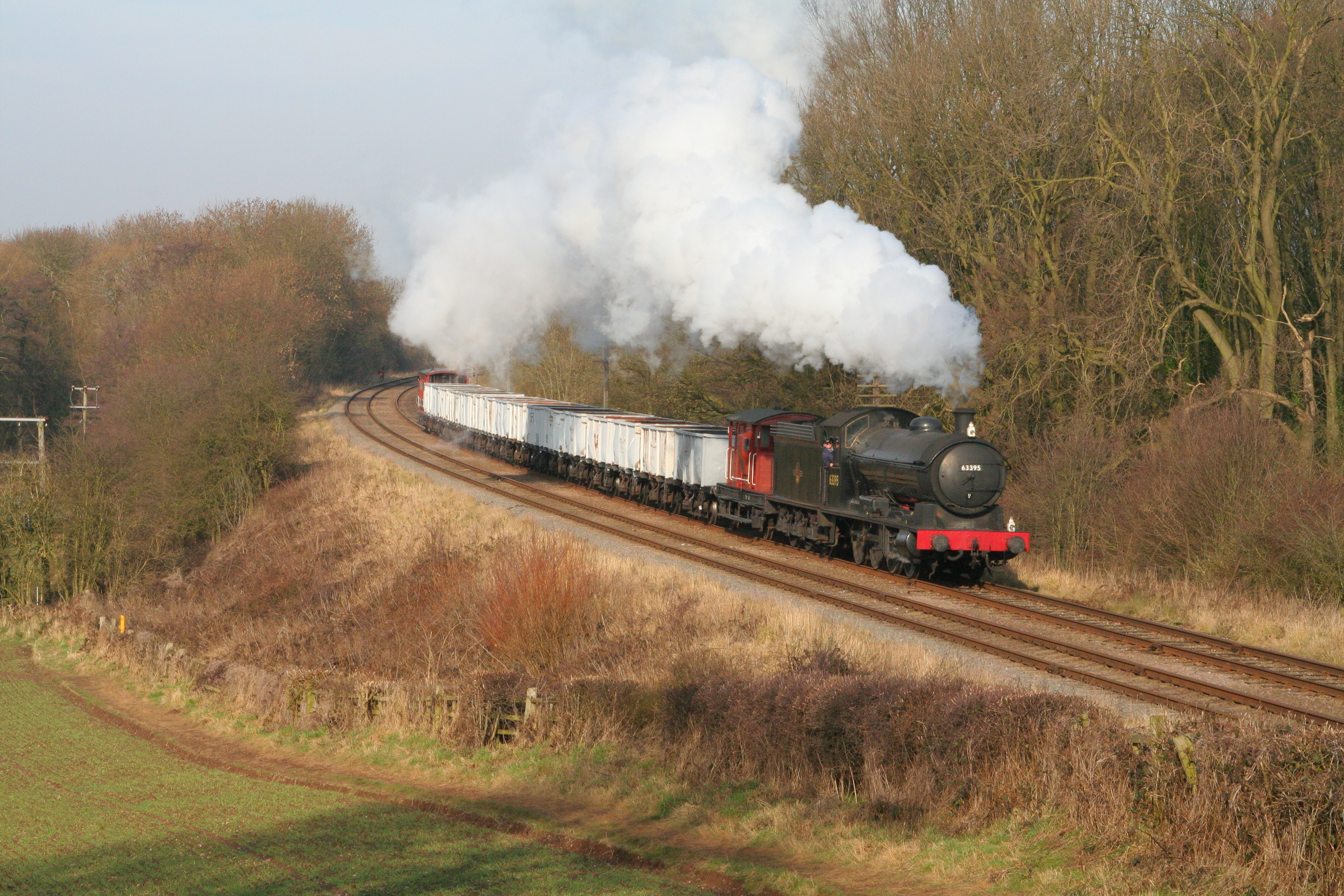
No. 63395 on the preserved Great Central Railway

== Models ==
Hornby has made a 1:76 (OO gauge) model of the class.
