= NER Class L =

Class of British steam locomotives

NER Class L LNER Class J73
Type and origin
- Power type: Steam
- Designer: Wilson Worsdell
- Builder: NER Gateshead works
- Build date: 1891-1892
- Total produced: 10
Specifications
- Configuration
  - Whyte: 0-6-0T
- Gauge: 4 ft 8 1/2 in (1,435 mm)
- Driver dia.: 4 ft 7.25 in (1.403 m)
- Length: 31 ft 8 in (9.65 m)
- Loco weight: 46.75 long tons (47.50 t)
- Fuel type: coal
- Fuel capacity: 2.5 long tons (2.5 t)
- Water cap.: 1,000 imp gal (4,500 L; 1,200 US gal)
- Firebox
  - Grate area: 15.6 sq ft (1.45 m^{2})
- Boiler pressure: 160 psi (1,100 kPa)
- Cylinders: Two, inside
- Cylinder size: 19 in × 24 in (480 mm × 610 mm)
- Valve gear: Joy
Performance figures
- Tractive effort: 21,320 lbf (94,800 N)

The North Eastern Railway Class L, classified as Class J73 by the London and North Eastern Railway (LNER), was a class of 0-6-0T steam locomotives. They were a specialised design, intended for use on the steep inclines of the Redheugh and Quayside banks on either side of the River Tyne. They were replaced on the Quayside branch by NER Class ES1 electric locomotives in 1905 but were re-allocated to other duties, mostly around Tyne Dock and Ferryhill and several were used on Humberside.

== Overview ==
The Class L was Wilson Worsdell's first design for the NER. Unusually for a Wilson Worsdell design, they were fitted with Joy valve gear instead of the Stephenson valve gear fitted to his later locomotives.

== Numbering ==
The locomotives were originally numbered 554–553. All 10 locomotives survived into British Railways ownership in 1948 and their BR numbers were 68355–68364.

== Withdrawal ==
They were all withdrawn between 1955 and 1960. None have been preserved.
