= Wilson Worsdell =

English railway locomotive engineer (1850–1920)

- Born: 7 September 1850; Monks Coppenhall, Crewe, Cheshire, England
- Died: 14 April 1920 (aged 69); South Ascot, Berkshire, England
- Citizenship: British
- Education: Ackworth School
- Spouse: Mary Elizabeth Bradford
- Parent(s): Nathaniel and Mary Worsdell
- Engineering career
- Discipline: Mechanical engineering

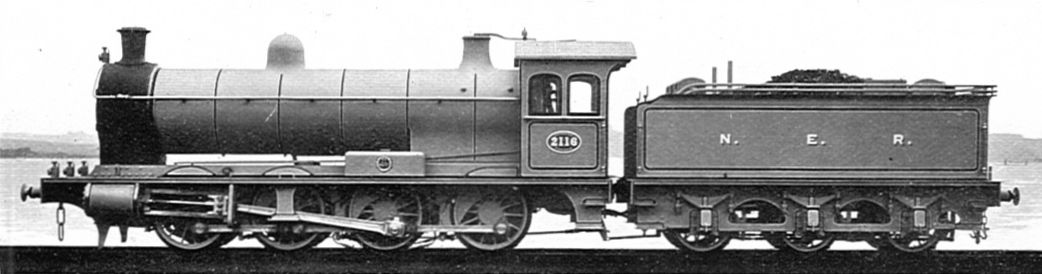
NER Class T locomotive 2116, designed by Wilson Worsdell

Wilson Worsdell (7 September 1850 – 14 April 1920) was an English locomotive engineer who was locomotive superintendent of the North Eastern Railway from 1890 to 1910. He was the younger brother of T.W. Worsdell. Wilson was born at Monks Coppenhall, near Crewe on 7 September 1850 to Nathaniel and Mary Worsdell; he was their tenth child and fourth son. In 1860 he was sent as a boarder to Ackworth, a Quaker school in Yorkshire.

== Career ==
Wilson Worsdell worked at Crewe for a short time, then moved to the US to work at the Altoona Works of the Pennsylvania Railroad. He returned to England in 1871 and worked for the London and North Western Railway (LNWR) and rose to be in charge of the locomotive shed at Chester. In 1883, he became an Assistant Locomotive Superintendent of the North Eastern Railway (NER). Wilson's brother, Thomas William Worsdell was Locomotive Superintendent of the NER from 1885 to 1890. When Thomas William retired, Wilson replaced him as the NER's Locomotive Superintendent, in which capacity he was a popular choice. In this capacity he was considered a mechanical genius being able to pinpoint problems with unerring accuracy. He also implemented the electrification of the lines in North Tyneside. He retired in May 1910.

== Patents ==
Wilson Worsdell has only one known patent:

- GB190716980 (with Walter Reuben Preston), published 23 July 1908, Improvements in and connected with blast pipes of locomotives

== Family ==
Wilson Worsdell was a son of Nathaniel Worsdell (1809–1886), and grandson of the coachbuilder Thomas Clarke Worsdell (1788–1862). His eldest brother, William (1838–1916), was also a locomotive engineer. T. C. Worsdell had become a Quaker at some point between 1812 and 1816, and his descendants, including Nathaniel, William and Wilson, were brought up in the Quaker faith.

Wilson married Mary Elizabeth Bradford, daughter of a Draper, in Staffordshire in 1882.

== Locomotive designs ==
- NER Class L (LNER Class J73) 0-6-0T
- NER Class M/3CC (LNER Class D19) 4-4-0
- NER Class M1 (LNER Class D17/1) 4-4-0
- NER Class N (LNER Class N9) 0-6-2T
- NER Class O (LNER Class G5) 0-4-4T
- NER Class P (LNER Class J24) 0-6-0
- NER Class P1 (LNER Class J25) 0-6-0
- NER Class P2 (LNER Class J26) 0-6-0
- NER Class P3 (LNER Class J27) 0-6-0
- NER Class Q (LNER Class D17/2) 4-4-0
- NER Class Q1 (LNER Class D18) 4-4-0
- NER Class E1 (LNER Class J72) 0-6-0T
- NER Class R (LNER Class D20) 4-4-0
- NER Class R1 (LNER Class D21) 4-4-0
- NER Class S (LNER Class B13) 4-6-0
- NER Class S1 (LNER Class B14) 4-6-0
- NER Class T (LNER Class Q5) 0-8-0
- NER Class U (LNER Class N10) 0-6-2T
- NER Class V (LNER Class C6) 4-4-2
- NER Class V/09 (LNER Class C6) 4-4-2
- NER Class W (LNER Class A6) 4-6-0T
- NER Class X (LNER Class T1) 4-8-0T
- NER Class Y (LNER Class A7) 4-6-2T

Business positions
Preceded by Thomas William Worsdell	Locomotive Superintendent of the North Eastern Railway; 1890-1910	Succeeded by Vincent Raven
