= NER Class U =

Class of British steam locomotives

NER Class U LNER Class N10
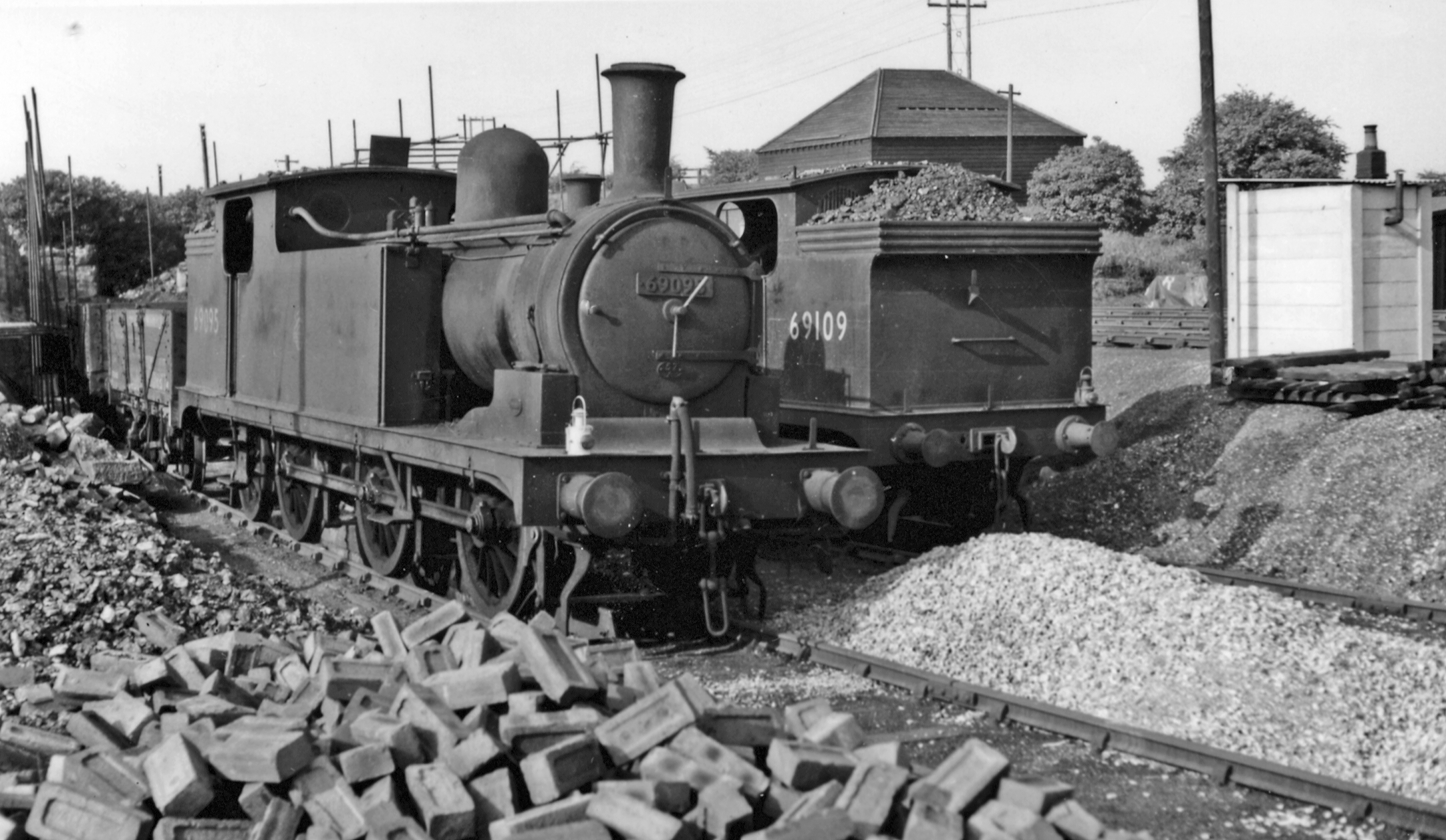
Type and origin
- Power type: Steam
- Designer: Wilson Worsdell
- Builder: NER
- Build date: 1902
- Total produced: 20
Specifications
- Configuration
  - Whyte: 0-6-2T
- Gauge: 4 ft 8 1/2 in (1,435 mm)
- Driver dia.: 4 ft 7 1/4 in (1.403 m)
- Fuel type: coal
- Boiler: 4 ft 3 in (1.30 m) diameter NER diagram no. 67
- Boiler pressure: 160 psi (1.1 MPa)
- Cylinders: two inside
- Cylinder size: 18 1/2 in × 26 in (470 mm × 660 mm)
- Valve gear: Stephenson
Performance figures
- Tractive effort: 21,904 lbf (97.43 kN)
Career
- Operators: North Eastern Railway; London and North Eastern Railway; British Railways
- Retired: 1955-1962
- Disposition: All scrapped

The NER Class U (LNER Class N10) was a class of 0-6-2 tank locomotives of the North Eastern Railway. It was designed by Wilson Worsdell and introduced in 1902.

== Use ==
The locomotives were used for shunting and on goods trains. All were fitted with Westinghouse brakes.

== Numbering ==
The whole class was transferred from the NER to the London and North Eastern Railway (LNER) in 1923 and to British Railways (BR) in 1948. Numbers (where known) are shown below.

NER	LNER	BR
1321	9090	69090
1667	9091	69091
1683	9092	69092
1697	9093	69093
1774	9094	69094
89	9095	69095
429	9096	69096
1109	9097	69097
1112	9098	69098
1132	9099	69099
1138	9100	69100
1148	9101	69101
1317	9102	69102
1706	9103	69103
1710	9104	69104
1699	9105	69105
1707	9106	69106
1711	9107	69107
1785	9108	69108
1716	9109	69109

== Withdrawal ==
One locomotive was withdrawn in 1948 and the remainder were withdrawn between 1955 and 1962. None is preserved.
