= NER Class P3 =

Class of British steam locomotives

NER Class P3 LNER Class J27
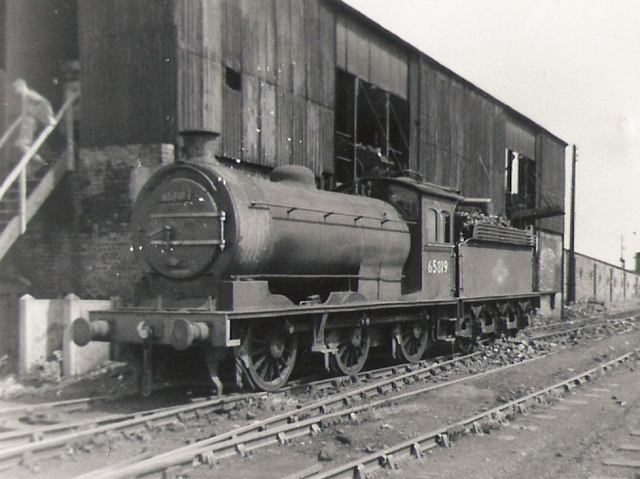
- A Class J27 locomotive at the coaling stage outside South Blyth shed
Type and origin
- Power type: Steam
- Designer: Wilson Worsdell
- Builder: NER Darlington Works (65); North British Locomotive Co. (20); Beyer, Peacock and Company (20); Robert Stephenson & Co. (10)
- Serial number: NBL: 18355–18374; BP: 5104–5123; RS: 3352–3361
- Build date: 1906–1923
- Total produced: 115
Specifications
- Configuration
  - Whyte: 0-6-0
  - UIC: C n2, C h2
- Gauge: 4 ft 8 1/2 in (1,435 mm) standard gauge
- Driver dia.: 4 ft 7 1/4 in (1.403 m)
- Length: 51 ft 11 1/8 in (15.827 m) over buffers
- Axle load: 17 long tons 18 cwt (18.2 t)
- Loco weight: 47–49.5 long tons (47.8–50.3 t; 52.6–55.4 short tons)
- Tender weight: 36.95 long tons (37.54 t; 41.38 short tons)
- Fuel type: Coal
- Fuel capacity: 5 long tons 0 cwt (5.1 t)
- Water cap.: 3,038 imp gal (13,810 L; 3,648 US gal)
- Firebox
  - Grate area: 20 sq ft (1.9 m^{2})
- Boiler pressure: 180 lbf/in^{2} (1.2 MPa)
- Cylinders: Two, inside
- Cylinder size: 18 1/2 in × 26 in (470 mm × 660 mm)
Performance figures
- Tractive effort: 24,640 lbf (109.6 kN)
Career
- Operators: North Eastern Railway; London and North Eastern Railway; British Railways
- Withdrawn: 1959-1967
- Disposition: One preserved, remainder scrapped

The North Eastern Railway (NER) Class P3, classified J27 by the LNER, is a class of 0-6-0 steam locomotive. The P3 Class was designed by Wilson Worsdell and was a relatively minor modification of the existing North Eastern Railway Class P2 (LNER Class J26). The most significant change was a deeper firebox with shallower sloping fire grate. This was achieved by raising the boiler slightly, and by reducing the clearance between the firebox and the rear axle. The P3 Class were a freight engine by nature and used for hauling long trains of freight.

== Construction ==
Initially eighty J27s were built between 1906 and 1909 in five batches, distributed amongst the NER's Darlington Works, North British Locomotive Company, Beyer, Peacock and Company, and Robert Stephenson and Company. Twelve years later, a batch of twenty five J27s were built at Darlington with Schmidt superheaters and piston valves. These were delivered in 1921-2 and were followed by a final order of ten placed in December 1922 and built by the LNER at Darlington Works in 1923. The superheated J27s could be identified by their extended smokeboxes.

== Post-war ==
After World War II, the J27s stopped hauling goods trains but they continued to haul heavy mineral trains. Withdrawals began in March 1959, but in June 1966 thirty-six were still putting in hard work hauling coal in County Durham and South Northumberland. The final J27s were withdrawn from the Blyth area where they operated the short trip workings between the nearby coalfield and shipping staithes. The last J27 was withdrawn in September 1967. The last four in active service were No. 65811, No. 65879, No. 65882, and No. 65884.

== Accidents and incidents ==
- On 4 November 1959, Locomotive No. 65847 had difficulty stopping a freight train, coming to rest foul of the line at West Sleekburn, Northumberland. Locomotive No. 65824 was hauling a freight train which was in a head-on collision. Both of its crew were killed.
- On 8 June 1960, locomotive No. 65892 was in a side-long collision with a National Coal Board locomotive at Hilton, County Durham. Both locomotives were derailed.

== Preservation ==
=== Restoration ===
One, BR 65894, has survived to preservation and was purchased directly from BR by the North Eastern Locomotive Preservation Group on 1 December 1966. There then followed restoration to full working order, initially at Tyne Dock where the locomotive was stored after withdrawal, then professionally at the then still functioning National Coal Board workshops at Philadelphia, Tyne and Wear, and then at Thornaby Depot. Final restoration, including the fitting of vacuum brake and steam heating apparatus for working passenger trains, was by the group's volunteers at ICI Billingham.

=== Appearances ===
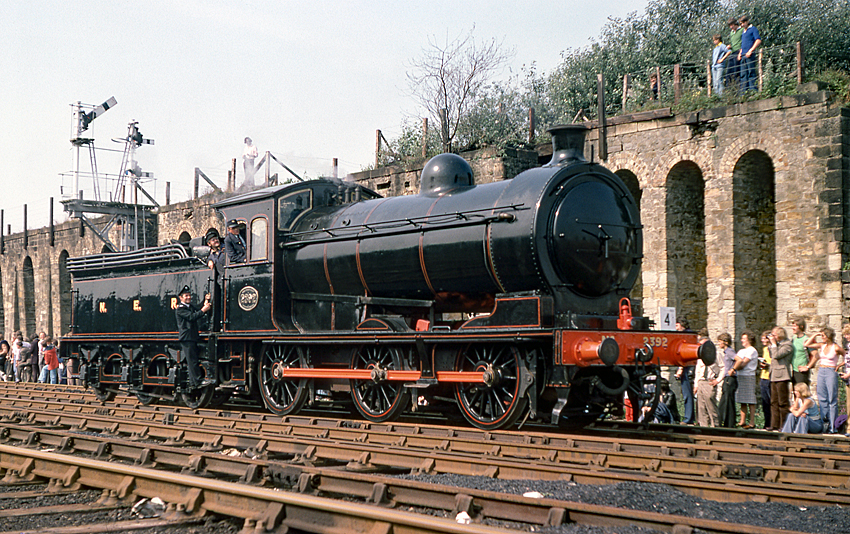
2392 in the S&D 150 cavalcade

The locomotive, fully restored as NER class P3 No. 2392, was delivered to the embryonic North Yorkshire Moors Railway in October 1971. The locomotive provided the mainstay of services in the period leading up to full re-opening of the line, when it piloted Lambton Collieries Tank No. 29 on the Royal Re-opening Special of 1 May 1973. Following its appearance as an exhibit at the Stockton and Darlington 150 celebrations and cavalcade, it was withdrawn for boiler repairs. From 1977 until early 1982 it was on display in the National Railway Museum at York.

After a further overhaul, 2392 returned to traffic on the N.Y.M.R. in the autumn of 1984. The engine then received another overhaul during the 1990s, resteaming in 1996 in BR Black livery as 65894, before reverting to NER livery in Autumn 2003. During these periods in operation, the loco saw use on the Keighley & Worth Valley Railway, Bo'ness and Kinneil Railway, the Llangollen Railway, the North Norfolk Railway, the Embsay and Bolton Abbey Steam Railway, the East Lancashire Railway, and the Weardale Railway alongside occasional use at the NYMR. The engine was again withdrawn for overhaul in May 2006 at the Darlington Railway Museum, where it initially went on display for two years before work on a further overhaul started.

=== Current status ===
The engine is still owned by the North Eastern Locomotive Preservation Group, and is currently at the North Yorkshire Moors Railway (NYMR) having been transferred from the NELPG's Hopetown (Darlington) works for the final stages of its most recent overhaul, partly funded by a Heritage Lottery Fund grant. The loco's overhaul was recently completed and 65894, in BR black livery, re-entered service on the NYMR in May 2018, following a lengthy 12 year restoration period.
