= NER Class V =

Class of 20 British 4-4-2 locomotives

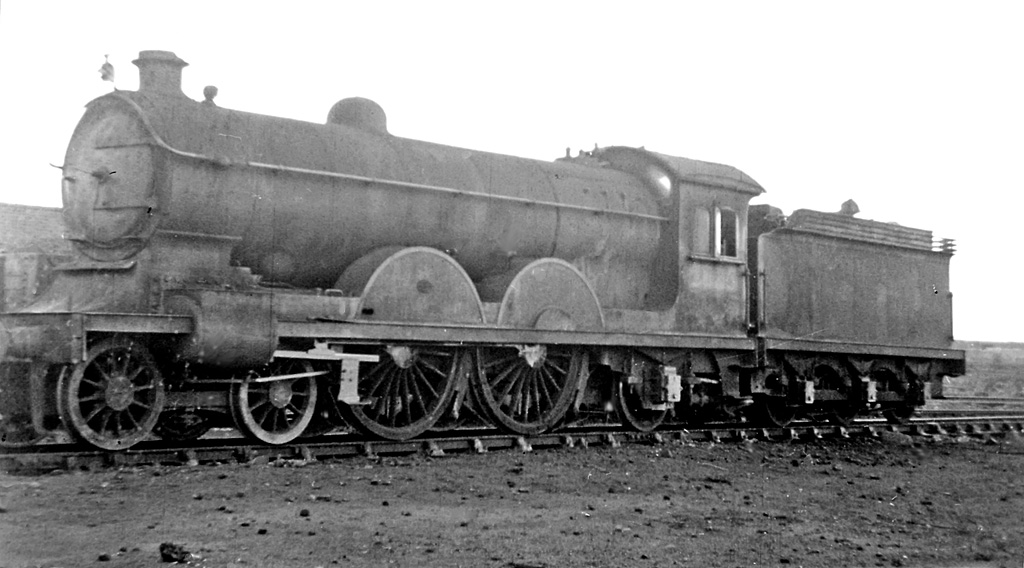
Type and origin
- Power type: Steam
- Designer: Wilson Worsdell
- Builder: V: Gateshead Works; V/09: Darlington Works
- Build date: V: 1903–1904; V/09: 1910
- Total produced: V: 10; V/09: 10
Specifications
- Configuration
  - Whyte: 4-4-2
- Gauge: 4 ft 8 1/2 in (1,435 mm)
- Leading dia.: 3 ft 7 1/4 in (1.099 m)
- Coupled dia.: 6 ft 10 in (2.083 m)
- Trailing dia.: 4 ft 0 in (1.219 m)
- Wheelbase: 52 ft 3 7/8 in (15.948 m)
- Length
  - Over couplers: 62 ft 8 3/8 in (19.110 m)
- Loco weight: 76 long tons 4 cwt (77.4 t)
- Tender weight: 45 long tons 6 cwt (46.0 t)
- Fuel type: Coal
- Fuel capacity: 5 long tons 0 cwt (5.1 t)
- Water cap.: 4,125 imp gal (18,750 L; 4,954 US gal)
- Firebox
  - Grate area: 27 sq ft (2.5 m^{2})
- Boiler pressure: 175 lbf/in^{2} (1,210 kPa; 12.3 kgf/cm^{2})
- Heating surface: 1,483.4 sq ft (137.81 m^{2})
- Cylinders: Two, outside
- Cylinder size: V: 20 in × 28 in (508 mm × 711 mm); V/09: 19 1/2 in × 28 in (495 mm × 711 mm)
- Valve gear: Stephenson
- Valve type: Piston valves
Career
- Operators: North Eastern Railway; London and North Eastern Railway; British Railways
- Number in class: 20
- Withdrawn: January 1943 – March 1948
- Disposition: All scrapped

The NER Class V was a class of twenty steam locomotives of the 4-4-2 wheel arrangement. They were designed by Wilson Worsdell for the North Eastern Railway (NER) as express passenger locomotives.

== History ==
In the early part of the twentieth century, the main express passenger services of the NER were mostly being hauled by 4-4-0 locomotives. The newest of these were Class R, thirty of which were built between 1899 and 1901; they were supplemented by the five 4-6-0 locomotives of Class S1 built in 1900–01. Train weights were increasing, and it was clear that a better design was required. The southern partner of the NER in the East Coast route was the Great Northern Railway, which since 1898 had built a number of 4-4-2 locomotives (GNR Class C1) which proved capable of hauling the heaviest expresses of the period; and so Worsdell decided upon the same wheel arrangement for a new class for the NER.

The first ten, built at Gateshead in 1903–04, were assigned Class V; the second ten, built at Darlington in 1910 had some detail differences and were assigned Class V/09 (or V1 according to some sources), the /09 suffix referring to the year that the design was prepared.

Class V were given numbers scattered between 295 and 1794 which were blank at the time. Class V/09 were given numbers 696–705. All twenty passed to the London and North Eastern Railway (LNER) at the 1923 Grouping, becoming LNER Class C6, and they retained their numbers on the LNER.

The locomotives were built to haul express passenger trains on the East Coast Main Line between York and Edinburgh Waverley, with a change of locomotives at Newcastle. By the end of 1920, most of the class were allocated to the two main Newcastle-area depots, ten at Gateshead and eight at Heaton; but the remaining two were at York. By Grouping, three had been reallocated to Tweedmouth, and York had gained a further two, leaving seven at Gateshead and six at Heaton. The York engines were mainly used between York and Newcastle; those at Tweedmouth worked between Berwick and Newcastle; but the Gateshead and Heaton engines could be used between Newcastle and York, Newcastle and Leeds, or between Newcastle and Edinburgh.

== Withdrawal ==
Withdrawal commenced with no. 532 in January 1943; later that year, the nineteen surviving locomotives were allotted new numbers 2930–48, but by the time the scheme was published, no. 649 (which had been allotted no. 2930) had also been withdrawn, so the new series as published was 2931–48. The actual renumbering did not commence until 1946, by which time several more had been withdrawn, and only seven were ultimately renumbered. Two, LNER nos. 2933 and 2937, remained in service at nationalisation, but both were withdrawn in March 1948 before the British Railways renumbering was prepared.

== Fleet list ==
No.	Builder	Built	Class	1920 depot	1946 LNER number	Renumbered	Withdrawn
532	Gateshead	November 1903	V	Heaton	–	–	January 1943
649	Gateshead	December 1903	V	Heaton	(2930)	–	August 1943
784	Gateshead	December 1903	V	Heaton	2931	November 1946	November 1947
295	Gateshead	June 1904	V	Gateshead	(2932)	–	March 1944
1680	Gateshead	June 1904	V	Heaton	2934	June 1946	November 1947
742	Gateshead	June 1904	V	Heaton	2933	October 1946	March 1948
1753	Gateshead	August 1904	V	Heaton	(2935)	–	July 1946
1776	Gateshead	October 1904	V	Heaton	(2936)	–	April 1944
1792	Gateshead	October 1904	V	Heaton	2937	November 1946	March 1948
1794	Gateshead	October 1904	V	Gateshead	(2938)	–	May 1944
696	Darlington	May 1910	V/09	Gateshead	2939	December 1946	December 1947
697	Darlington	May 1910	V/09	Gateshead	(2940)	–	October 1945
698	Darlington	June 1910	V/09	Gateshead	2941	December 1946	December 1947
699	Darlington	June 1910	V/09	York	(2942)	–	July 1944
700	Darlington	July 1910	V/09	Gateshead	(2943)	–	May 1946
701	Darlington	July 1910	V/09	Gateshead	(2944)	–	August 1944
702	Darlington	August 1910	V/09	York	(2945)	–	July 1946
703	Darlington	August 1910	V/09	Gateshead	(2946)	–	January 1945
704	Darlington	September 1910	V/09	Gateshead	2947	January 1947	November 1947
705	Darlington	September 1910	V/09	Gateshead	(2948)	–	December 1943
