= NER Class Y =

Class of British steam locomotives (1910–1911)

NER Class Y LNER Class A7
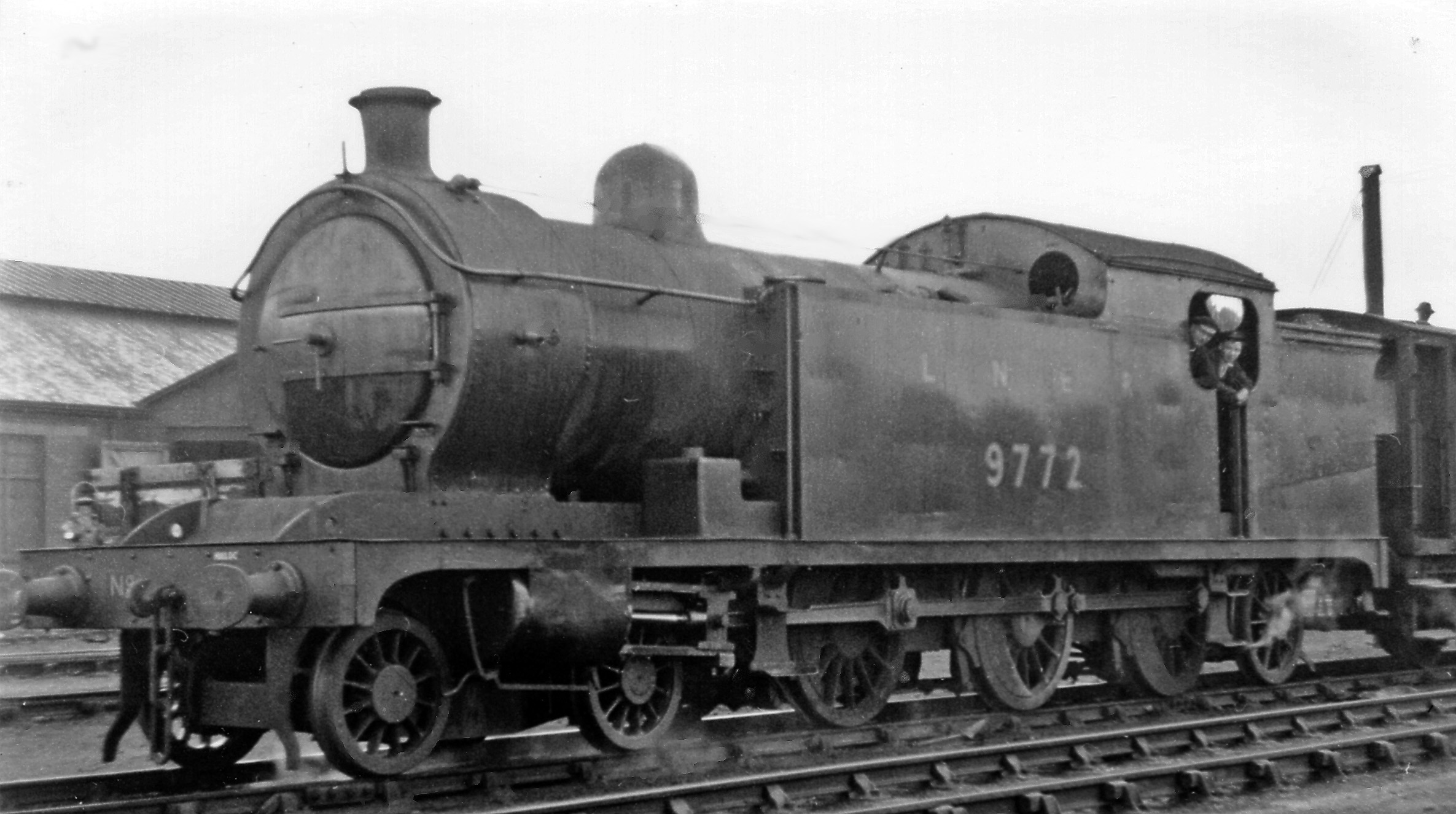
- No. 9772 at Hull Dairycoates Locomotive Depot 1947
Type and origin
- Power type: Steam
- Designer: Wilson Worsdell
- Builder: Darlington Works
- Build date: October 1910 – June 1911
- Total produced: 20
Specifications
- Configuration
  - Whyte: 4-6-2T
  - UIC: 2′C1′ n3t, later 2′C1′ h3t
- Gauge: 4 ft 8 1/2 in (1,435 mm)
- Leading dia.: 3 ft 1 1/4 in (0.946 m)
- Coupled dia.: 4 ft 7 1/4 in (1.403 m)
- Trailing dia.: 3 ft 9 1/4 in (1.149 m)
- Wheelbase: 34 ft 3 in (10.439 m)
- Length: 43 ft 10 in (13.360 m)
- Axle load: 19.50 long tons (19.81 t; 21.84 short tons)
- Adhesive weight: 55.50 long tons (56.39 t; 62.16 short tons)
- Loco weight: 87.50 long tons (88.90 t; 98.00 short tons)
- Fuel type: Coal
- Fuel capacity: 5.00 long tons (5.08 t; 5.60 short tons)
- Water cap.: 2,300 imp gal (10,000 L; 2,800 US gal)
- Boiler pressure: 160 to 180 lbf/in^{2} (1.1 to 1.2 MPa)
- Cylinders: Three
- Cylinder size: 16 1/2 in × 26 in (419 mm × 660 mm)
- Valve gear: Stephenson
- Valve type: 7 1/2-inch (191 mm) piston valves
Performance figures
- Tractive effort: 26,140 to 29,405 lbf (116.28 to 130.80 kN)
Career
- Operators: North Eastern Railway; London and North Eastern Railway; British Railways
- Power class: BR: 5F, 3F from May 1953
- Axle load class: LNER/BR: Route availability: 7
- Withdrawn: 1951 - 1957
- Disposition: All scrapped

The North Eastern Railway (NER) Class Y (LNER Class A7) 4-6-2T tank locomotives were designed whilst Wilson Worsdell was Chief Mechanical Engineer, but none were built until 1910 by which time Vincent Raven had taken over.

== Overview ==
The Class Y locomotives were intended for hauling coal trains and were developed from the NER Class X (LNER Class T1) 4-8-0T heavy shunters. However, they had larger boilers and smaller cylinders for higher working speeds. Twenty were built in one batch and numbered between 1113 and 1195. Originally built with saturated boilers pressed to 175 lbf/in^{2} (1.21 MPa), seven locomotives were later fitted with boilers equipped with superheaters and pressed to 160 lbf/in^{2} (1.10 MPa).

All twenty locomotives passed to the London and North Eastern Railway at the 1923 Grouping. The LNER left the NER's locomotive numbers unchanged, but raised the boiler pressure of the saturated locomotives to 180 lbf/in^{2} (1.2 MPa). They also fitted ten more locomotives with the 160 lbf/in^{2} superheated boilers that the LNER classified as diagram 55.

By the time the A7s entered LNER ownership in 1923, the A7s had been relegated to shunting in the larger marshalling yards. Their power was invaluable when shunting heavy trains over the shunting hump. In the 1930s, Nos. 1136 and 1175 were allocated to hauling chalk quarry trains from Hessle Quarry to Stoneferry Cement Works, in the Hull area.

Heavy mineral traffic declined after the end of World War II, and the A7s moved to the Hull area, except for Nos. 1181 and 1192 which stayed at Stockton. At Hull, the A7s replaced the old Hull and Barnsley Railway (H&BR) types which were being withdrawn at that time.

During LNER ownership in the 1940s, two locomotives were rebuilt with diagram 63B superheated boilers pressed to 175 lbf/in^{2}; the locomotives were then assigned to Class A7/1.

In the LNER 1946 renumbering scheme, the class received the 9770 to 9789 block; at nationalisation in 1948 all 20 locomotives passed to British Railways they were assigned the numbers 69770–69789, although the last locomotive was withdrawn before it was renumbered.

BR continued the rebuilding scheme, dealing with another 13 locomotives, although one received a diagram 63B saturated boiler and one a diagram 63C superheated one. Both were pressed to 175 lbf/in^{2}.

== Withdrawal ==
The A7s were withdrawn between 1951 and 1957 and none have survived into preservation.

== Fleet list ==
Table of locomotives
NER No.	LNER 1942 No.	Date built	Date superheated	Date rebuilt	Date Withdrawn	Notes
1113	9770	Oct 1910	May 1922	Jul 1950	Oct 1954	
1114	9771	Nov 1910	Sep 1924	Jun 1948	Nov 1954	
1126	9772	Nov 1910	Jul 1917	—	Dec 1957	
1129	9773	Dec 1910	Oct 1930	Jul 1951	Mar 1955	
1136	9774	Dec 1910	May 1932	May 1950	Aug 1954	
1170	9775	Dec 1910	—	Nov 1945	Apr 1952	
1174	9776	Jan 1911	Jan 1930	Jan 1952	Jun 1954	
1175	9777	Jan 1911	May 1919	—	May 1952	
1176	9778	Feb 1911	—	—	May 1955	
1179	9779	Feb 1911	Feb 1929	Dec 1949	Nov 1954	
1180	9780	Feb 1911	Dec 1930	Jan 1950	Nov 1954	
1181	9781	Mar 1911	Mar 1929	Apr 1951	Nov 1956	
1182	9782	Mar 1911	Mar 1923	—	Dec 1957	
1183	9783	Mar 1911	Nov 1928	Apr 1948	Dec 1956	
1185	9784	Apr 1911	Mar 1922	May 1948	Mar 1956	
1190	9785	Apr 1911	Nov 1918	Sep 1943	Nov 1955	
1191	9786	May 1911	Apr 1930	Apr 1948	Dec 1957	Rebuilt with superheated dia 63C boiler
1192	9787	May 1911	—	Aug 1951	Aug 1954	Rebuilt with saturated dia 63B boiler
1193	9788	May 1911	Sep 1920	Jul 1948	Nov 1955	
1195	9789	Jun 1911	Nov 1922	—	May 1951	Withdrawn before BR number applied
