= NER Class N =

Class of 20 British 0-6-2T locomotives

NER Class N LNER Class N9
Type and origin
- Power type: Steam
- Designer: Wilson Worsdell
- Build date: 1893-1894
- Total produced: 20
Specifications
- Configuration
  - Whyte: 0-6-2T
- Gauge: 4 ft 8 1/2 in (1,435 mm)
- Driver dia.: 5 ft 1 1/4 in (1.556 m)
- Fuel type: coal
- Boiler: 4 ft 3 in (1.30 m) diameter NER diagram no. 67
- Boiler pressure: 160 psi (1.1 MPa)
- Cylinders: two inside
- Cylinder size: 19 in × 26 in (480 mm × 660 mm)
- Valve gear: Stephenson
Performance figures
- Tractive effort: 20,840 lbf (92.7 kN)
Career
- Operators: North Eastern Railway; London and North Eastern Railway; British Railways
- Disposition: All scrapped

The NER Class N (LNER Class N9) was a class of 0-6-2 tank locomotives of the North Eastern Railway. It was designed by Wilson Worsdell and introduced in 1893.

== Modifications ==
Most of the engines were modified by fitting larger water tanks. This increased the total capacity from 1,371 to 1,630 imp gal (6,230 to 7,410 L; 1,647 to 1,958 US gal). Three engines still had their original tanks at the 1923 Grouping.

Air brakes were fitted to 10 locomotives between 1900 and 1923. The same engines received vacuum brakes as well, between 1928 and 1931.

== Use ==
The N9s were used on local goods trains.

== Numbering ==
Seventeen locomotives passed into British Railways ownership in 1948 and their BR numbers are shown in the table below.

NER	LNER	BR
1617	9410	69410
1618	9411	69411
1640	9412	-
1641	9413	69413
1642	9414	69414
1643	9415	69415
1644	9416	-
1645	9417	-
1646	9418	69418
1647	9416	69419
1648	9420	69420
1649	9421	69421
1650	9422	69422
1651	9423	69423
1652	9424	69424
1653	9425	69425
1654	9426	69426
1655	9427	69427
383	9428	69428
1705	9429	69429

== Withdrawal ==
Withdrawals took place between 1946 and 1955. None were preserved.
