= NER Class O =

Class of British steam locomotives (1894–1901)

NER Class O LNER Class G5
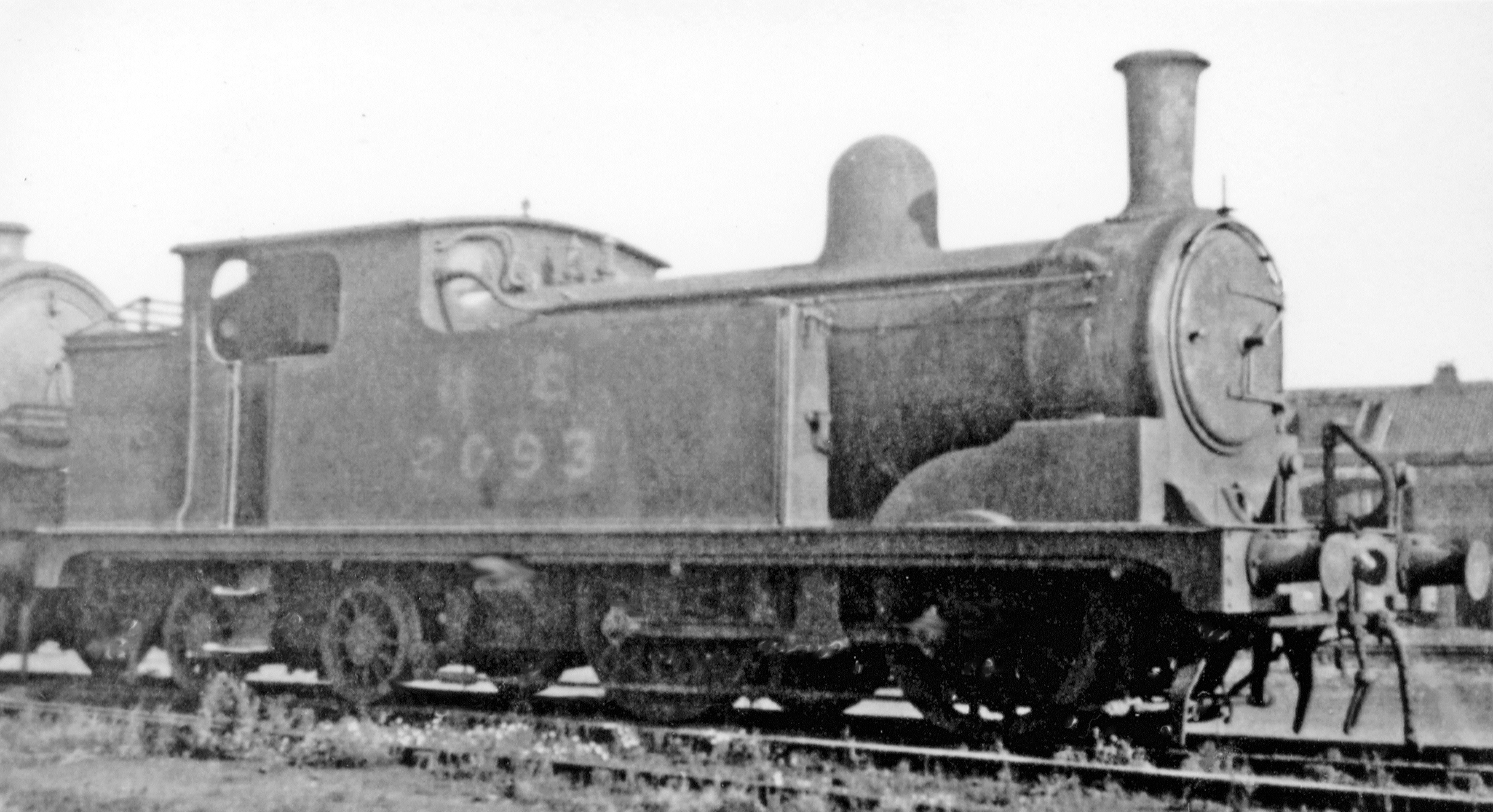
- Ex-NER 0-4-4T in Stratford Locomotive Shed yard, 1946.
Type and origin
- Power type: Steam
- Designer: Wilson Worsdell
- Build date: 1894-1901
- Total produced: 110
Specifications
- Configuration
  - Whyte: 0-4-4T
- Gauge: 4 ft 8 1/2 in (1,435 mm)
- Driver dia.: 5 ft 1.25 in (1.556 m)
- Loco weight: 54.2 long tons (55.1 t)
- Fuel type: coal
- Boiler pressure: 160 psi (1,100 kPa)
- Cylinders: two inside
- Cylinder size: 18 in × 24 in (460 mm × 610 mm)
Performance figures
- Tractive effort: 17,265 lbf (76.80 kN)
Career
- Withdrawn: 1950-1958
- Disposition: All original locomotives scrapped. One replica being constructed.

The NER Class O (LNER Class G5) was a class of 0-4-4T steam locomotives of the North Eastern Railway, designed by the company's Chief Engineer, Wilson Worsdell. They all survived into British Railways ownership in 1948 and their BR numbers were 67240-67349. They were withdrawn between 1950 and 1958.

== Accidents and incidents ==
In July 1957, locomotive No. 67338 was used for a series of tests into the performance of concrete sleepers when trains were derailed. These tests took place between Halifax and Keighley, Yorkshire.

== Preservation ==
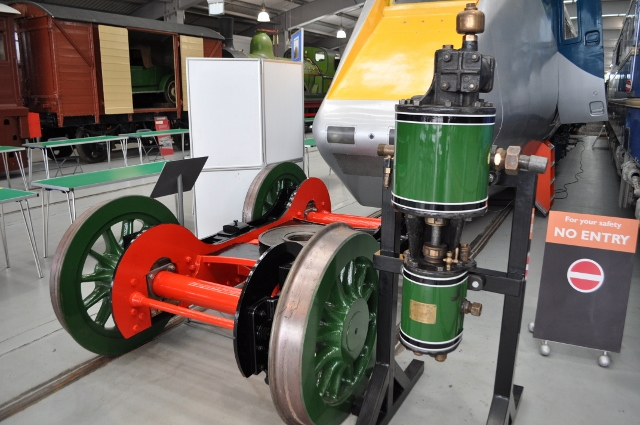
1759’s bogie in 2011.

None of the G5s were preserved, although a replica, No. 1759 is under construction at Shildon. It will be built for use on various heritage lines.

== Models ==
Bachmann Branchline have made a OO gauge model of the NER O class.
