= NER Class P1 =

Class of British steam locomotives

NER Class P1 LNER Class J25
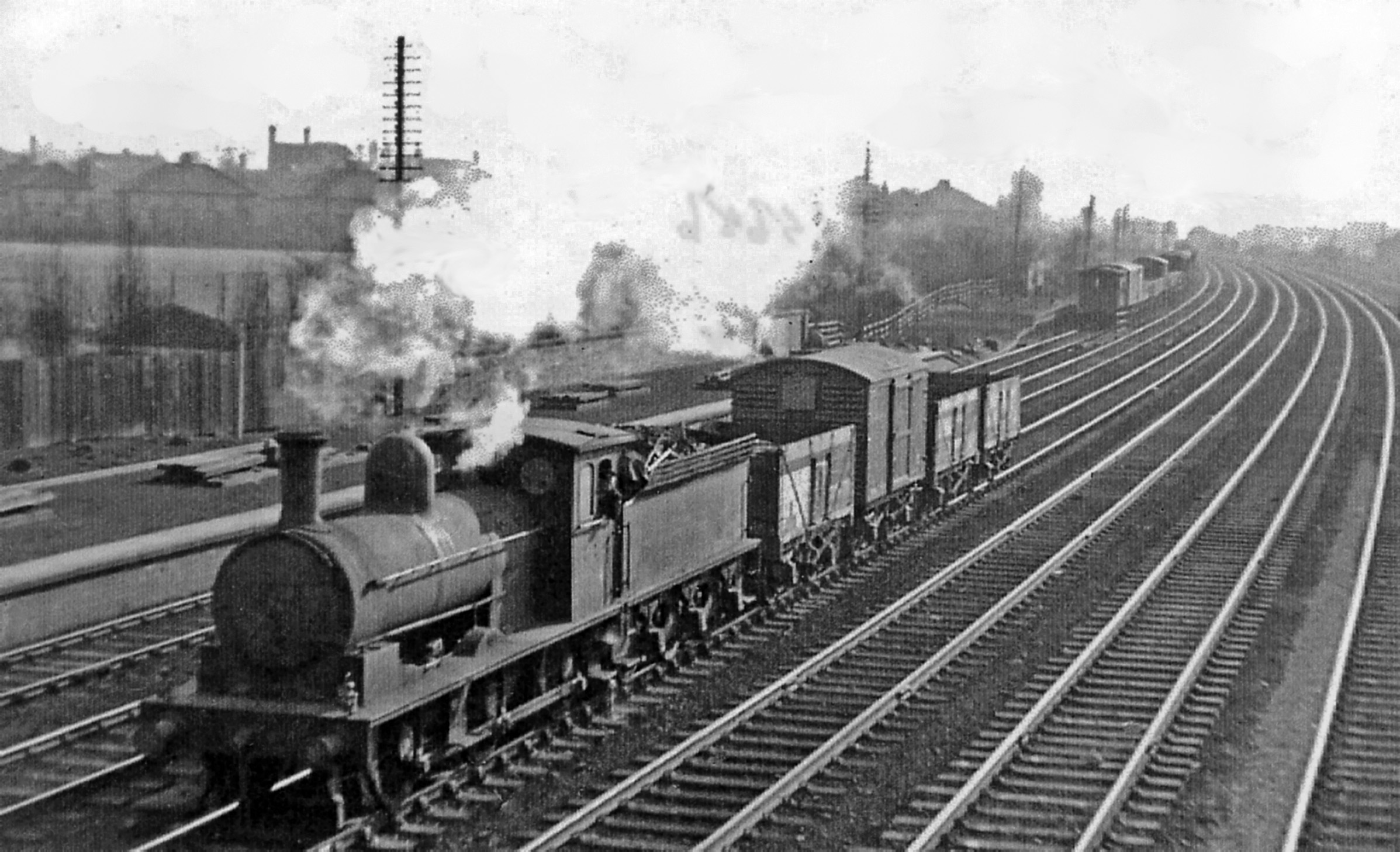
Type and origin
- Power type: Steam
- Designer: Wilson Worsdell
- Builder: NER Gateshead Works (80); NER Darlington Works (40)
- Build date: 1898-1902
- Total produced: 120
Specifications
- Configuration
  - Whyte: 0-6-0
- Gauge: 4 ft 8 1/2 in (1,435 mm)
- Driver dia.: 4 ft 7.25 in (1.403 m)
- Loco weight: 39.55 long tons (40.18 t)
- Fuel type: coal
- Boiler pressure: 160 psi (1,100 kPa)
- Cylinders: two inside
- Cylinder size: 18.5 in × 26 in (470 mm × 660 mm)
Performance figures
- Tractive effort: 21,905 lbf (97.44 kN)
Career
- Class: NER: P1; LNER: J25
- Power class: LNER: 4; GWR: A; BR: 3F
- Axle load class: LNER/BR: 3; GWR: Yellow
- Withdrawn: 1950-1963
- Disposition: All scrapped

The NER Class P1 (LNER Class J25) was a class of 0-6-0 steam locomotives of the North Eastern Railway. Class P1 was a development of Class P, having a boiler four inches longer, and a firebox six inches longer. To accommodate these, the wheelbase was increased by nine inches. The cylinder stroke was also increased by two inches. None survived into preservation.

== Ownership ==
=== North Eastern Railway ===
A total of 120 was built at the North Eastern Railway's locomotive workshops at both Gateshead and Darlington, between 1898 and 1902, in six batches of 20. Their numbers were 1961-2000, 2031–80, 2126-42 with the remainder scattered between 25 and 1743.

=== London and North Eastern Railway ===
All passed to the London and North Eastern Railway (LNER) in 1923, and their NER numbers were retained, but they were placed in LNER Class J25.

World War II

During World War II, 40 locomotives were loaned to the Great Western Railway (GWR). The first transfers to the GWR occurred in October 1939, and the last was not returned to the LNER until December 1946.

Renumbering

The general LNER renumbering scheme was prepared in 1943, and at that time, 85 locomotives of the J25 class remained: these were allotted 5645-5729, being renumbered during 1946, apart from six which had been withdrawn in the interim.

=== British Railways ===
Seventy-six locomotives survived into British Railways (BR) ownership in 1948. Of these, 64 were given BR numbers, being the 1946 LNER numbers increased by 60000.

== Accidents and incidents ==
- On 15 December 1911, locomotive No. 1972 was hauling a freight train which was derailed at Lartington, North Riding of Yorkshire when its driver braked too sharply.
