= NER Class P =

Class of British steam locomotives

NER Class P LNER Class J24
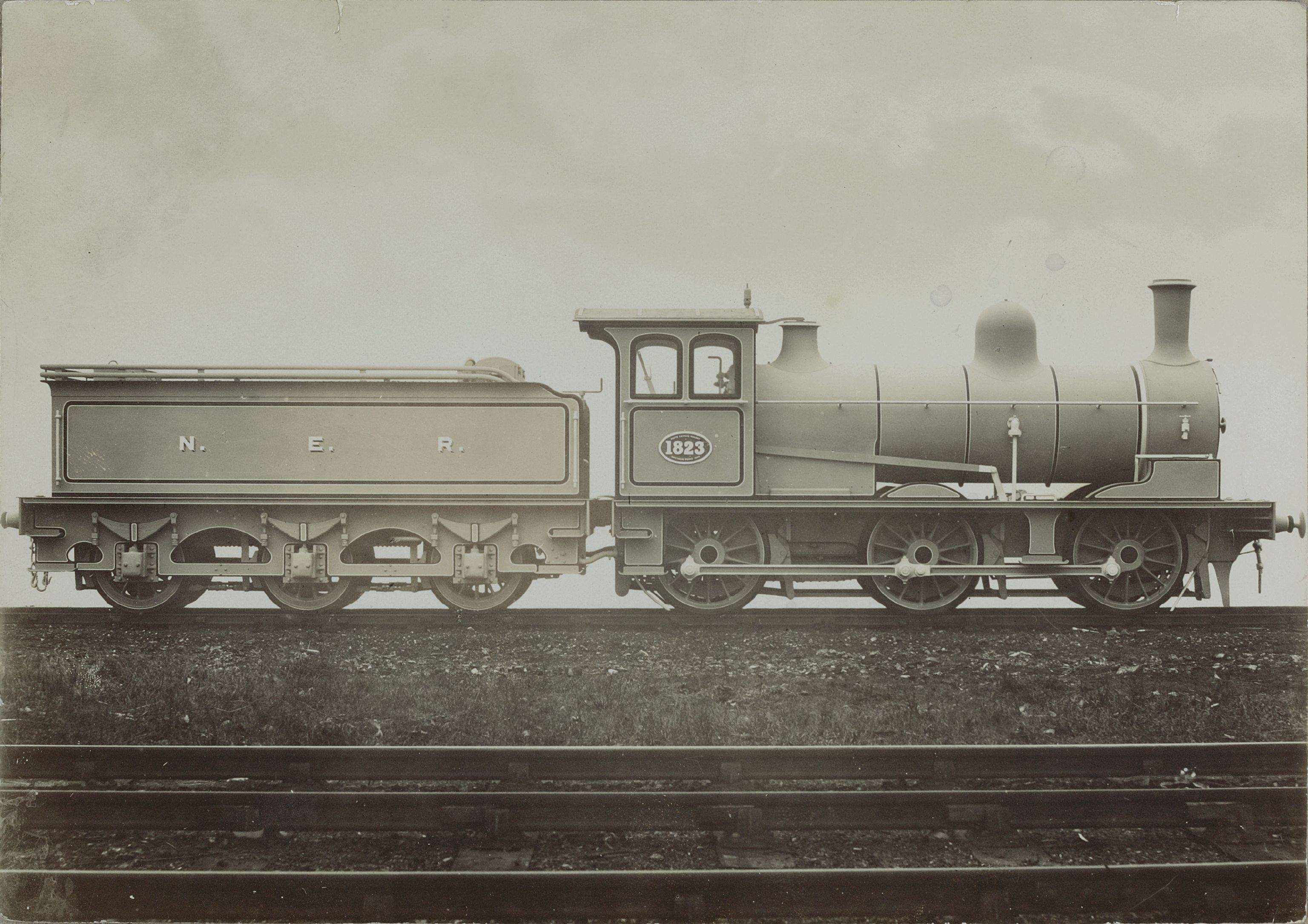
Type and origin
- Power type: Steam
- Designer: Wilson Worsdell
- Builder: NER Gateshead Works (50); NER Darlington Works (20)
- Build date: 1894-1898
- Total produced: 70
Specifications
- Configuration
  - Whyte: 0-6-0
- Gauge: 4 ft 8 1/2 in (1,435 mm)
- Driver dia.: 4 ft 7.25 in (1.403 m)
- Loco weight: 38.5 long tons (39.1 t) (ns); 39.55 long tons (40.18 t) (su)
- Tender weight: 36.95 long tons (37.54 t)
- Fuel type: coal
- Boiler pressure: 160 psi (1,100 kPa)
- Cylinders: Two, inside
- Cylinder size: 18 in × 24 in (460 mm × 610 mm) (ns); 18.5 in × 24 in (470 mm × 610 mm) (su)
Performance figures
- Tractive effort: 19,140 lbf (85,100 N) (18" cylinders); 20,220 lbf (89,900 N) (18½" cylinders)
Career
- Withdrawn: 1933-1951
- Disposition: All scrapped

The NER Class P (LNER Class J24) was a class of 0-6-0 steam locomotives of the North Eastern Railway. They were designed by Wilson Worsdell for mineral traffic.

== Modifications ==
As built the locomotives had slide valves, but 20 were fitted with piston valves and superheaters between 1914 and 1920. The cylinder bore was increased by half an inch at the same time.

In the infobox (right) 'ns' denotes non-superheated and 'su' denotes superheated. Some locomotives later had their superheaters removed but the piston valves were retained.

== British Railways ==
Thirty-four locomotives survived into British Railways ownership in 1948 and numbered 65600-65644 (with gaps).

== Withdrawal ==
Withdrawals started under LNER ownership in 1933. British Railways quickly withdrew the remainder and all were scrapped by the end of 1951.
