= NER Class T =

Class of British steam locomotives

NER Class T and T1 LNER Class Q5
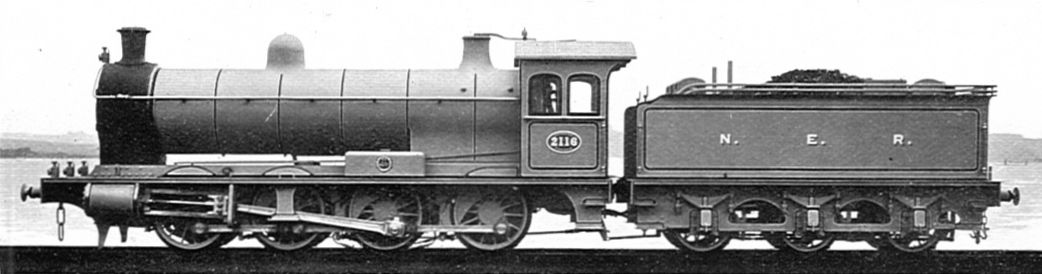
- NER Nº 2116, circa 1907
Type and origin
- Power type: Steam
- Designer: Wilson Worsdell
- Build date: 1901
- Total produced: Class T: 40; Class T1 50
Specifications
- Configuration
  - Whyte: 0-8-0
- Gauge: 4 ft 8 1/2 in (1,435 mm)
- Driver dia.: 4 ft 7 1/4 in (1.403 m)
- Loco weight: 58.4 long tons (59.3 t)
- Fuel type: coal
- Boiler pressure: 175 psi (1,210 kPa)
- Cylinders: two outside
- Cylinder size: 20 in × 26 in (510 mm × 660 mm)
Performance figures
- Tractive effort: 28,000 lbf (120 kN)
Career
- Disposition: All but a single tender scrapped

The NER Class T (LNER Class Q5) was a class of 0-8-0 steam locomotives of the North Eastern Railway.

== Sub-classes ==
There were two NER sub-classes. Class T had piston valves, while class T1 had slide valves. The London and North Eastern Railway classified both types as Q5.

Between 1932 and 1934, the LNER rebuilt fourteen Q5s with larger boilers and these were given the sub-class Q5/2. The unrebuilt locomotives were re-classified Q5/1.

== Preservation ==
No Q5s survive in preservation. However, many tenders from withdrawn Q5s were used to replace old Q6 tenders. As such, the tender that once belonged to No. 771 survives behind the preserved Q6 No. 2238.
