= NER Class X =

Class of British steam locomotives

NER Class X LNER Class T1
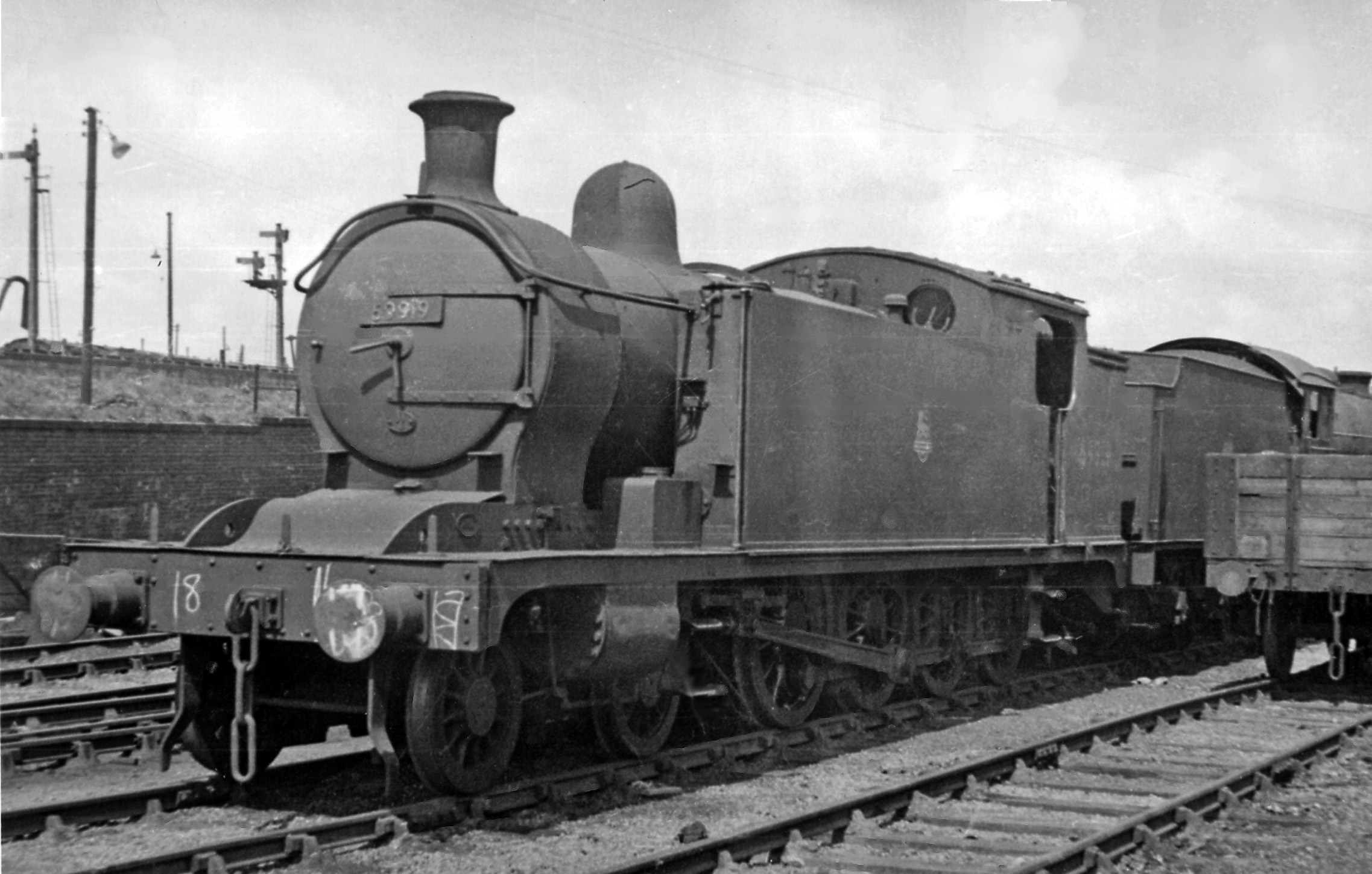
- No. 69919 at Stockton Locomotive Depot 1954
Type and origin
- Power type: Steam
- Designer: Wilson Worsdell
- Builder: NER Gateshead Works (10); Darlington Works (5)
- Build date: 1909–1910 (10) and 1925 (5)
- Total produced: 15
Specifications
- Configuration
  - Whyte: 4-8-0T
  - UIC: 2′D n3t
- Gauge: 4 ft 8 1/2 in (1,435 mm)
- Leading dia.: 3 ft 1 1/4 in (0.946 m)
- Coupled dia.: 4 ft 7 1/4 in (1.403 m)
- Wheelbase: 29 ft 0 in (8.839 m)
- Length: 42 ft 1 in (12.827 m)
- Axle load: 18.00 long tons (18.29 t)
- Adhesive weight: 67.60 long tons (68.68 t)
- Loco weight: 85.40 long tons (86.77 t)
- Fuel type: Coal
- Fuel capacity: 4.25 long tons (4.32 t)
- Water cap.: 2,500 imp gal (11,000 L; 3,000 US gal)
- Firebox
  - Grate area: 23 sq ft (2.1 m^{2})
- Boiler pressure: 175 lbf/in^{2} (1.21 MPa)
- Heating surface
  - Firebox: 127 sq ft (11.8 m^{2})
  - Tubes: 1,168 sq ft (108.5 m^{2})
  - Total surface: 1,295 sq ft (120.3 m^{2})
- Cylinders: Three
- Cylinder size: 18 in × 26 in (457 mm × 660 mm)
- Valve gear: Stephenson
- Valve type: 8 3/4-inch (222 mm) piston valves
Performance figures
- Tractive effort: 34,080 lbf (151.6 kN)
Career
- Operators: North Eastern Railway; London and North Eastern Railway; British Railways
- Power class: BR: 7F, 5F from May 1953
- Axle load class: LNER/BR: Route availability 8
- Withdrawn: 1937, 1955–1961
- Disposition: All scrapped

The NER Class X (LNER Class T1) was a class of 4-8-0T tank locomotive designed by Wilson Worsdell for the North Eastern Railway. They were intended for use as powerful shunting engines to arrange and move coal wagons for loading into ships. In total 15 were built, 10 by the NER between 1909 and 1910, and a further five in 1925 by the London and North Eastern Railway (LNER). They had three cylinders with divided drive: the inside cylinder driving the leading axle, the outside cylinders driving the centre.

== Overview ==
The reversing gear was originally mechanical, but was replaced on all but two of the locomotives (nos. 1355/8) by steam-operated reversing gear between 1932 and 1934. The steam reversing gear was removed again between 1941 and 1947. In 1929, No. 1656 was moved to the newly built Whitemoor Yard at March, Cambridgeshire. In 1932, this locomotive was replaced by Nos. 1355 and 1358. Whitemoor preferred the ex-GCR 0-8-4T (LNER Class S1) for hump shunting, so in 1934 No 1358 was moved to Doncaster, and No. 1355 to Mexborough. In 1936, No. 1355 moved to King's Cross to shunt the engine shed for seven weeks, before joining No. 1358 in Doncaster. These two locomotives were scrapped at Doncaster in 1937. The remaining T1s continued to work coal trains at various docks and marshalling yards throughout North East England. After World War II, coal exports never returned to their pre-war levels. Hence, many of the T1s moved to other sheds for heavy shunting duties.

== Numbering ==
On the North Eastern Railway the first ten locomotives were numbered 1350–9; these numbers were retained following the formation of the LNER on 1 January 1923. The five built in 1925 were given LNER numbers 1656–60. In 1946, the thirteen remaining locomotives were renumbered 9910–22; these all passed to British Railways in 1948, being renumbered 69910-69922 between 1948 and 1951.

== Withdrawal ==
Two T1s were withdrawn in 1937, and the remainder were withdrawn between 1955 and 1961. No examples have been preserved.

Year	Quantity in service at start of year	Quantity withdrawn	Locomotive numbers	Notes
1937	15	2	1355/58	
1955	13	2	69914/19	
1956	11	1	69922	
1957	10	2	69911/16	
1958	8	2	69913/18	
1959	6	5	69910/12/15/17/20	
1960	1	0	–	
1961	1	1	69921	

== Sources ==
- Ahrons, E. L. (1927). The British Steam Railway Locomotive 1825-1925. Amen Corner, London: Locomotive Publishing Co.
- Boddy, M. G.; Brown, W. A.; Fry, E. V.; Hennigan, W.; Hoole, Ken; Manners, F.; Neve, E.; Platt, E. N. T.; Proud, P.; Yeadon, W. B. (June 1977). Fry, E. V. (ed.). Locomotives of the L.N.E.R., Part 9B: Tank Engines—Classes Q1 to Z5. Kenilworth: RCTS. ISBN 0-901115-41-X.
- Ian Allan ABC of British Railways Locomotives, 1948 edition, part 4, page 56
