= Rod =

Rod, Ród, Rőd, Rød, Röd, ROD, or R.O.D. may refer to:

== Devices ==
- Birch rod, made out of twigs and or wood from birch or other trees for corporal punishment
- Ceremonial rod, used to indicate a position of authority
- Connecting rod, main, coupling, or side rod, in a reciprocating engine
- Control rod, used to control the rate of fission in a nuclear reactor
- Divining rod, two rods believed by some to find water in a practice known as dowsing
- Fishing rod, a tool used to catch fish, like a long pole with a hook on the end
- Lightning rod, a conductor on top of a building to protect the building in the event of lightning by taking the charge harmlessly to earth
- Measuring rod, a kind of ruler
- Switch (corporal punishment), a piece of wood used as a staff or for corporal punishment, or a bundle of such switches
- Truss rod, a steel part inside a guitar neck used for its tension adjustment

== Arts and entertainment ==
- Read or Die, a Japanese anime and manga
  - Read or Die (OVA), an original video animation based on the manga
  - Read or Dream, a manga set in the Read or Die universe
  - R.O.D the TV, a 26-episode anime series
- Röd, a 2009 album by Swedish band Kent
- The Rods, American heavy metal band
- Rod Norman, a character in the soap opera EastEnders
- Rod (Avenue Q), a character in the stage musical Avenue Q
- Rod Flanders, a character in the TV series The Simpsons
- "R.O.D.", a 2013 song by Korean rapper G-Dragon featured on his second studio album Coup d'Etat

== People ==
- Rod (given name)
- Rod (surname)
- Rød (surname)

== Places ==
- Ród, a village in Tilişca Commune, Sibiu County, Romania
- Rød (disambiguation), several populated places in Norway
- Rőd, Aiton, from the Hungarian name for Rediu, a village in Aiton Commune, Cluj County, Romania
- Rod, California, a former settlement in Kern County
- Rod (river), a tributary of the Apold in Sibiu County, Romania

== Science and technology ==
- Cuisenaire rods, to teach children arithmetics
- Rod-shaped bacterium, a shape of bacteria such as E. coli
- Rod (optical phenomenon), a photographic artifact claimed by some to be alien life
- Rod (unit), an Imperial unit of length, also known as the pole or perch
- Rod cell, a cell found in the retina that is sensitive to light/dark (black/white)
- Real-time outbreak and disease surveillance (RODS)
- rod, ISO 639-3 code for the Rogo language of Nigeria
- Rate of descent (RoD), a measurement in aviation

== Other uses ==
- Railway Operating Division, a division of the British Army's Royal Engineers
- Record of Decision, a formal decision document issued by the United States government
- Rod (god), a Slavic creator god
- Rods (tarot suit)
- Roughly Obsess and Destroy, a professional wrestling stable
- Ror, an Indian caste also known as "Rod"
- A dowel
- A firearm

== See also ==
- DeRodd, DeAndre McCullough's brother, on The Corner
- Hrod (disambiguation)
- Hot rod, often also referred to as "rod"
- Pole (disambiguation)
- Rodd, a surname
- Rood (disambiguation)
- Staff (disambiguation)
- Stick (disambiguation)
