= Rod (surname) =

Rod is a surname. Notable people with the surname include:

- Carmo Rod (16 July 1939 – 13 August 1975), professional name of Carmo Piedade Rodrigues, Indian singer and director
- Édouard Rod (1857–1910), French-Swiss novelist
- John Rod (1856–1920), English-New Zealander businessman
- Johnny Rod (born 1957), professional name of John Tumminello, American bass guitar player
- Jorge A. Rod (born 1947), American politician
- Jose Rod (born 1963), professional name of José Remedios Rodrigues, Indian singer and composer
- Minguel Rod (1924–1955), professional name of Miguel Manoel Rodrigues, Portuguese singer and composer
- Tomáš Rod (born 1988), Czech ice hockey forward
- Van Rod (1923–1974), pseudonym of Gene Bilbrew, American cartoonist

== See also ==
- Rød (surname)
- Rodd
- Kapten Röd
