= Krod (disambiguation) =

Krod may refer to:

- Francisco Rodríguez (baseball, born 1982), a Venezuelan Major League Baseball player, nicknamed "K-Rod".
- KROD (AM) 600 kHz, El Paso, Texas, USA; a talk radio station
- KDBC-TV 4, El Paso, Texas, USA; formerly KROD-TV
- Kröd Mändoon and the Flaming Sword of Fire, a British-American comedic sword and sorcery television series.
- Krod Records, a German record label

== See also ==
- Krodh
- Krodh (film)
- WROD AM 1340 Daytona Beach, Florida, USA
- Rod (disambiguation)
