= Richmond Vale railway line =

Former colliery railway line in New South Wales, Australia

The Richmond Vale Railway was a 4 ft 8 1/2 in (1,435 mm) colliery railway line in the Hunter Valley of New South Wales, Australia, servicing coal mines at Minmi, Stockrington, Pelaw Main and Richmond Main. It was over 26 km (16 mi) long and passed through three tunnels, and was the last commercially operated railway in Australia to use steam locomotives.

== History ==
The line was privately owned, by the private firm of J & A Brown and its successor companies, J & A Brown and Abermain Seaham Collieries (JABAS) and Coal & Allied. It was constructed in sections, the earliest section being from Hexham to Minmi, built by John Eales in 1856 to service his colliery at Minmi. At Hexham the railway crossed the then Hunter River Railway Company's line to Maitland (the current Main Northern line) and several coal loading staiths were built on the bank of the Hunter River to allow the loading of coal onto ships.

=== Minmi Collieries & Railways ===
In March 1859 J & A Brown purchased the railway & mine from John Eales. By June 1859 they had constructed a connection and exchange siding with the Great Northern Railway at Hexham to allow the coal to be railed to the shipping port at Newcastle. In 1861 J & A Brown extended the railway line at Minmi a further 300 yards (274 m) and sunk a new pit named 'C' pit, they also established a workshops at this pit.

In 1874 a new tunnel colliery named Duckenfield Colliery was sunk to the North of 'C' pit and a branch railway was laid to this colliery. This was soon followed in 1876 by another new colliery sunk to the East of 'C' pit named Brown's Colliery (also known as Back Creek Colliery), a new branch line was also laid to this mine.

The fastest recorded journey on the line was a late passenger train from Minmi to Hexham at 60 mph (97 km/h).

=== Richmond Vale Railway & Collieries ===
ROD 2-8-0 locomotive hauling a loaded coal train on the Richmond Vale Railway

The New South Wales Legislative Assembly passed the Richmond Vale Coal-mine Railway Act in 1900 which allowed the construction of line from the Minmi line (at a location later known as Minmi Junction) to serve Richmond Vale Colliery. In October 1900 before construction of the line had commenced the Browns had purchased the adjoining Stanford Greta Colliery which was renamed Pelaw Main in April 1901. Until the RVR was completed to Pelaw Main its production was hauled over a connecting railway to the East Greta Coal Mining Company's Stanford Merthyr Colliery and then onwards to East Greta Junction. Construction of the RVR did not commence until early 1904, with construction of the line to Pelaw Main completed June 1905, with the branch line to Richmond Vale Colliery being completed in August 1905. Richmond Vale Colliery although founded in 1890, was not fully developed until 1910 when the colliery was renamed Richmond Main in 1911, however the mine did not reach full production until 1918.

In 1909–10 the line across Hexham Swamps was duplicated between the exchange sidings and Richmond Vale Junction (latter renamed Minmi Junction). During 1913–14 with the development of Duckenfield No.2 colliery at Stockrington taking place, the main line was duplicated between Minmi Junction and Stockrington. A cabin to house the electric staff instrument for the section to Six Mile Loop was constructed at Stockrington. In 1942 with the re-arrangement of the main lines at Stockrington to cater for the new Stockrington No.2 Colliery a new staff cabin was built adjacent to the level crossing at Doghole and the staff instruments were relocated to this new cabin.

=== Method of safeworking ===
The original safeworking the line after the opening of the RVR was a "Ticket and Telephone System." Tickets were issued to the train driver at the start of the section, and the information was telephoned to the officer in charge at the other end of the section. The section at the time was Pelaw Main to Richmond Vale Junction (later renamed Minmi Junction). Trains were not allowed to travel in opposite directions on the section at the same time, and before a train could enter the section the section had to be cleared by phone communication with the other end of the section. There was a 30-minute delay between trains proceeding in the same direction, and if the preceding train was still in the section "Caution" was written on the ticket issued.

This system worked well until November 1910, when a railmotor carrying the manager of Pelaw Main Colliery collided with the rear of a coal train in No.2 Tunnel, killing him and seriously injuring his passenger. After the coroner's inquest into this accident, electric staff instruments were installed by the New South Wales Government Railways for J & A Brown. As part of the installation of electric staff instruments, the loop at six-mile loop was brought into use as a crossing point. Staff instruments were installed at Minmi Junction, Six Mile Loop, Richmond Main Junction (Later renamed Richmond Vale Junction) and Pelaw Main. When Richmond Main Colliery started producing coal instruments were also installed for the Richmond Main – Richmond Vale Junction Section. The Minmi Junction staff instruments were moved to Stockrington in 1914 with the completion of the duplication of the line from Minmi Junction. After the construction of the direct passenger line was constructed between Richmond Main and Pelaw main Collieries in 1922, electric staff instruments were also installed on this line. The double track section of the RVR was worked by "Telephone Block" controlled by the traffic officers at both Hexham and Stockrington.

=== Stockrington Area Collieries ===
During 1912 development work started for a new mine named Duckenfield No.2 Colliery, which was located at Stockrington (near Minmi) on the RVR, but work ceased on this work in 1914. In 1922 development of Duckenfield No.2 recommenced and by the time this colliery was ready to produce coal in 1935 it had been renamed Stockrington Colliery. Further Collieries were developed in the Stockrington Valley: Duckenfield No.5 Colliery (in 1931), Stockrington No.2 Colliery (in 1940) and Stockrington No.2 Colliery No.3 Tunnel (in 1954).

=== Closure of Minmi Collieries ===
Duckenfield Colliery at Minmi closed in 1916 and Brown's Colliery closed in 1924, both mines were, however, maintained, and the railway line remained open to serve the workshops. Following a need for Borehole seam coal for use in the new water tube boilers at Richmond Main Power Station, both mines were reopened on a smaller scale in 1930. Both collieries remained open until 1932, and in 1934 both mines were sealed, the remaining workshop equipment moved to the workshops at Hexham and the line to Minmi was then closed and used for wagon storage. In late 1948 the line was relaid up to a point near where the Duckenfield Colliery branch left the main line to serve a new open cut mine being developed. This open cut opened in 1949 and mined the borehole seam outcrop around the Minmi area; this open cut removed any remains of both Duckenfield and Brown's Collieries. The open cut remained open until July 1954, the Minmi branch remained until being lifted for scrap in 1974.

=== Passenger Line between Richmond Main and Pelaw Main Collieries ===
In 1922 to increase capacity on the Pelaw Main to Richmond Vale Junction section a 'Direct Passenger Line' was built from the compressor house at Pelaw Main to Richmond Main. This line was used for the miner's passenger trains from Pelaw Main to Richmond Main. After the centralisation of locomotive facilities at Pelaw Main in 1925 this line was also used for the transferring of locomotives and rolling stock between the two collieries. The miners' trains over this line ceased in April 1959, the line remained open for locomotive movements until the closure of Richmond Main.

=== Changes in company ownership ===
On 5 March 1930, the last major Brown family member John Brown, aged 78, died, and the J & A Brown firm was amalgamated with Abermain Seaham Collieries with the new company being known as J & A Brown & Abermain-Seaham Collieries (commonly abbreviated to JABAS). This merger added the three Abermain Collieries served by their own railway and the SMR and the two Seaham Collieries served by a private line that branched off the main Northern Railway at Cockle Creek, to the collieries controlled by the company. Soon afterwards in April 1931 JABAS purchased the East Greta Coal Mining Company Limited, which was in financial trouble due to the recent miner's lockout. This added Stanford Merthyr No.1 at Stanford Merthyr, Stanford Merthyr No.2 at Paxton, and the recently closed East Greta Nos.1 and 2 Collieries at East Greta, all of which were served by the SMR under the company's control. This also gave JABAS a 50% interest in South Maitland Railways. Soon after this JABAS replaced the Merthyr with Main in the two Stanford Merthyr collieries names so they could market their Greta seam coals under a common "Main" name.

In 1960 JABAS merged with Caledonian Collieries to form Coal & Allied. After this merger JABAS became the subsidiary company that carried out the mining operations of Coal & Allied until being renamed Coal & Allied Operations Pty Ltd in 1980. In April 1967 Coal & Allied purchased Hebburn Limited which added Hebburn No.2 and its associated railway to the company's assets. The purchase of Hebburn Limited also gave Coal & Allied full ownership of South Maitland Railways Pty Ltd.

=== The 'Link Line' and flood workings ===
The Richmond Vale railway had two connections to the nearby privately owned South Maitland Railway lines at Pelaw Main. The first being the original connection to Stanford Merthyr Colliery, which fell out of use after the completion of the RVR in 1905, this connection was rebuilt in 1934 after the 1931 purchase of the East Greta Coal Mining Company by JABAS to allow the haulage of coal from Stanford Main No.1 Colliery over the RVR. The second connection to the South Maitland system dated from 1936 when a "Link Line" was constructed from Pelaw Main Colliery to the SMR at Weston. This line was used by JABAS for any gas coal from its 3 Abermain collieries and Stanford Main No.2 Colliery at Paxton that was for shipment at the company's coal loader at Hexham, any coal that was to be shipped at the Dyke at Newcastle still had to travel over the SMR to East Greta Junction and the New South Wales Government Railways to Newcastle. With the opening of the coal preparation plant at Hexham the traffic over the line increased as the small coal that was to be washed also travelled over the link line. The line fell out of use after the closure of rail operations at Abermain No.2 Colliery in December 1963 and the connection with the SMR was lifted in August 1964, the line was lifted during 1973.

The Richmond Vale railway provided a separate route and connection to the Main Northern line at Hexham and was used as an alternate route when the South Maitland lines were flooded during the 1949–1952 and 1955 floods.

=== Hexham Coal Preparation Plant ===
To cater for the increased demand for small coal a central coal preparation plant was built by JABAS adjacent to the exchange sidings at Hexham. Construction of this plant and associated sidings began during 1953 and the completed plant came into operation in June 1953. The preparation plant was served by a series of new sidings with connections to the RVR at the Stockrington end entry to the exchange sidings and to the NSW Department of Railways coal roads. The connection to the government mainlines was at the southern end of the plant and these sidings were known as J & A Brown's Coal Plant Sidings, Hexham. The sidings had a dump station for unloading the unwashed coal and a loading point for loading the washed coal into coal wagons. The connection to government main remained in use until 1962, when following the construction of a stacking and reclaim system the plant was then serviced via the exchange sidings and the connection was removed in 1973.

=== Closure of the line beyond Stockrington ===
Richmond Vale Railway's No.10 Richmond Main at Doghole crossing after leaving Stockrington in May 1972

A dramatic slump in the coal industry from the mid-1950s on saw many colliery closures. Following the opening of Stockrington No.2 Colliery No.3 Tunnel in 1954, Duckenfield no.5 Colliery closed in 1955, followed by Stockrington Colliery in 1956 and Stockrington No.2 Colliery in 1957. Stanford Main No.1 Colliery closed in 1957; in February 1961 Pelaw Main Colliery closed, although the railway line to this mine remained open to serve the locomotive sheds at this colliery. On 14 July 1967 Richmond Main Colliery, that had once held the record for the largest daily production in the State, was also closed, except for its power station which lasted until 1976. After the closure of Richmond Main Colliery, J & A Brown, Abermain Seaham Collieries, ceased operations beyond Stockrington No.2 Colliery on the Richmond Vale Railway. All serviceable locomotives were transferred from Pelaw Main to the Hexham Exchange Sidings and others transferred to Pelaw Main sheds. Loading also ceased at the staithes at Hexham with the Sixty-miler collier MV Stephen Brown loading for the last time on 1 November 1967. The railway line to the staithes remained in use serving the adjacent engineering workshops.

Despite Stockrington No.2 Colliery continuing to work at full capacity, following the closure of the line beyond Stockrington the railway began single line working only. Initially the "up" line was used with the "down" line being used for the storage of surplus coal hopper wagons. However over the remaining life of the railway both lines saw long periods of single line working. This meant a logjam developed from time to time which necessitated week-end workings on the railway in order to reduce colliery stockpiles. The oil crisis of the early 1970s revived Stockrington No.2 Colliery's life and by mid 1973 some six to eight trains each carrying 500 Tons ran between Stockrington and Hexham.

In 1973 all of the rails towards Richmond Main beyond the site of the former Stockrington No.1 Colliery were lifted for use at other Coal & Allied (as J & A Brown etc., had now become) operations. In October 1973 the line serving the engineering workshops at Hexham was closed and the right angled crossing across the Government Railway mainline was removed. The engineering workshops remained open constructing and overhauling equipment for the underground coal mining industry.

=== Unit train loader at Hexham and the end of Non-Air working on the PTC main line ===
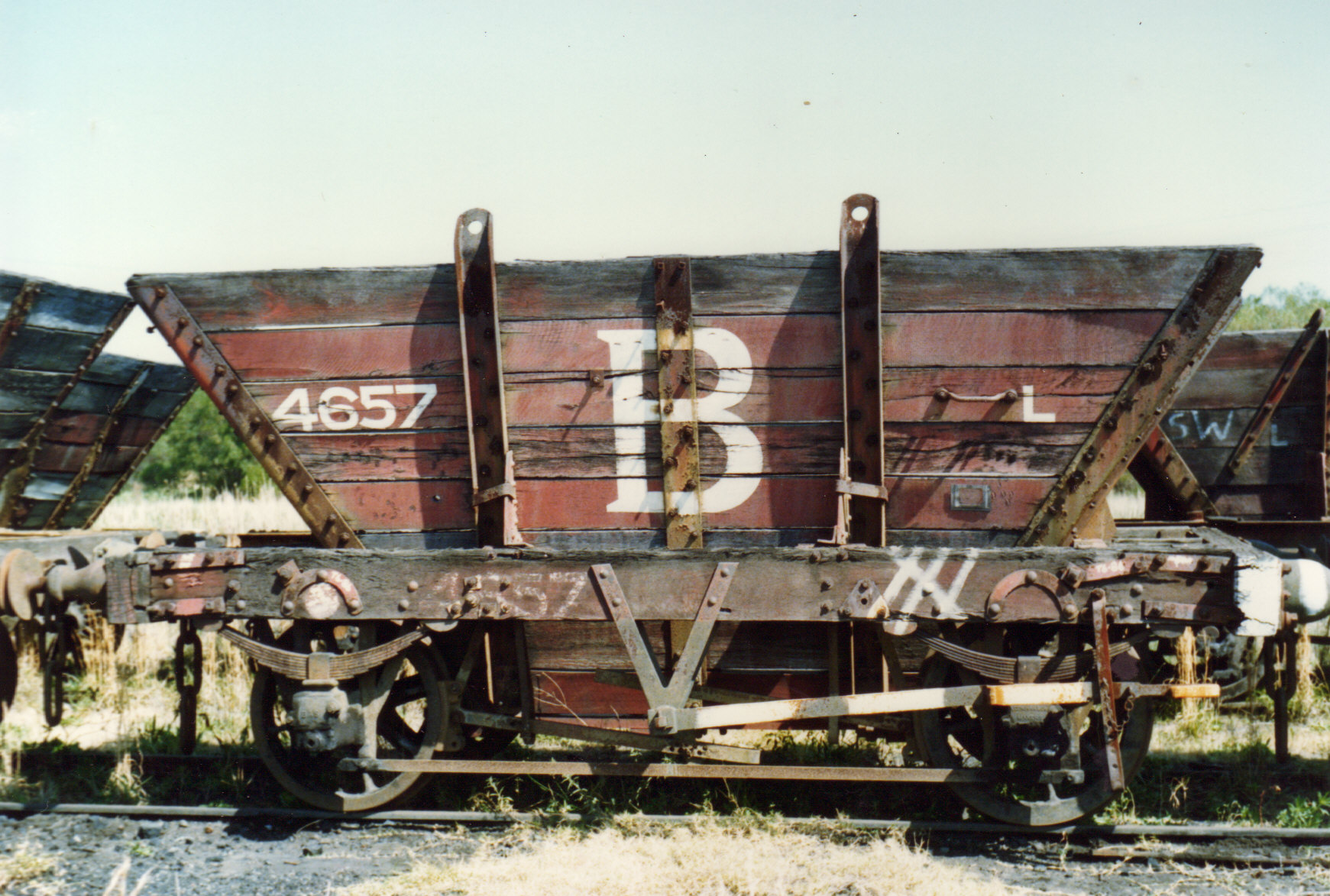
J & A Brown 10 ton non-air wagon at Hexham 1990

During 1972 the Public Transport Commission advised the users of non-air coal wagons that they planned to ban the operation of these wagons to Port Waratah in the near future. Due to the number of loading points at the various Coal & Allied operations that would have needed converting as they were designed to accept non-air type wagons only, the company decided to build a Unit Train Loading System at the Hexham Coal Preparation Plant and load all of the company's export coal through this system. The PTC would still work non-air wagons from East Greta Junction to Hexham, but from Hexham onwards the trains had to consist of air braked wagons.

The work consisted of a new set of sidings and dump hoppers between the coal preparation plant and the PTC main line to allow the emptying of non-air wagons of washed coal, these sidings were known as Coal & Allied Siding. Unwashed coal ran via the existing exchange sidings. The new loading point was constructed at the Newcastle end of the preparation plant and was served by a balloon loop and a 1200T loading bin. The rails for both balloon loop and Coal & Allied Siding came from the section of the RVR beyond Stockrington. The balloon loop was brought into use in June 1973, Coal & Allied siding was also ready for use in June 1973 but due to industrial problems it was not used until 17 August 1973. The last non-air train from Hexham to Port Waratah ran on 15 August 1973.

The non-air wagons continued to be used between East Greta Junction and Hexham, but by 1977 the PTC was planning to change over this traffic to the older BCH type wagons that had been released from the longer distance coal trains with the changeover to occur during Easter 1977. Because of this planned changeover large numbers of non-air wagons were scrapped, however by August 1977 with many non-air wagons scrapped and the promised BCH wagons yet to appear on the East Greta to Hexham trains, it became necessary for the SMR, RVR and coal preparation plant at Hexham to work Saturdays to ensure that sufficient wagons were returned to the collieries to allow loading to take place on the following Monday. By late October sufficient BCH trains had been made available to eliminate the need for Saturday workings. By early 1978 it was planned to end the use on non-airs on the main line and the last train ran on 8 February 1978. From this date onwards the remaining 1,000 wagons were used on the RVR between Stockrington and Hexham only.

=== Final closure and demolition ===
Due to the tight economic conditions facing the NSW coal mining industry at the time and the need to rationalise some of its operations, Coal & Allied decided it was more economical to ship the coal to port by road and on 28 August 1987 announced the planned closure of the Stockrington to Hexham line from 25 September 1987. The railway operated normally until 18 September when following a dispute between a loco crew and management, coal haulage ceased and only empty wagons were to be worked to Hexham for storage. The last coal was dumped at the coal preparation plant on 21 September and on 22 September No.25 cleared the empty wagons from the preparation plant and then made two trips to Stockrington to work the remaining empty wagons to Hexham. However, on 24 September as part of the vigorous protest efforts by the railway employees, No.25 was hijacked and after spending a day at Doghole the loco was moved to Lenaghans Drive road bridge and a protest camp set up. However, due to a lack of support from their fellow unionists at the other Coal & Allied operations the protest ended with no effect on 15 October 1987.

Within weeks after the railways closure the sidings were lifted from Stockrington area leaving only the main line and dead end head shunt intact. The rails were also lifted from the RVR served dump hoppers at the coal preparation plant. In January 1988 scrapping commenced of the many stored coal wagons, this scrapping was completed in August 1988. A selection of 40 wagons was kept for preservation by the RVRM.

In May 1988 the coal preparation plant at Hexham was also closed, this was followed by the closure of Stockrington No.2 Colliery in June 1988. Demolition of Stockrington No.2 soon followed and this was completed by December 1988. Dismantling of the coal preparation plant at Hexham started in March 1989 with demolition taking place over the following 18 months. With the downturn in the underground coalmining industry the engineering workshops at Hexham also closed in November 1989, this marked the end of Coal & Allied operations in the lower Hunter Valley.

== Locomotives ==
=== 1-2 ===
The first locomotives, No. 1 and 2, used on the original Minmi to Hexham railway were 0-4-2T side tank locomotives built by R&W Hawthorn of Newcastle upon Tyne in 1856 (builders Nos. 947 and 948). In 1922 they were both rebuilt into saddle tanks. No.1 was scrapped in 1942 and No. 2 was sold to Stewarts & Lloyds in 1941.

=== 3-4 ===
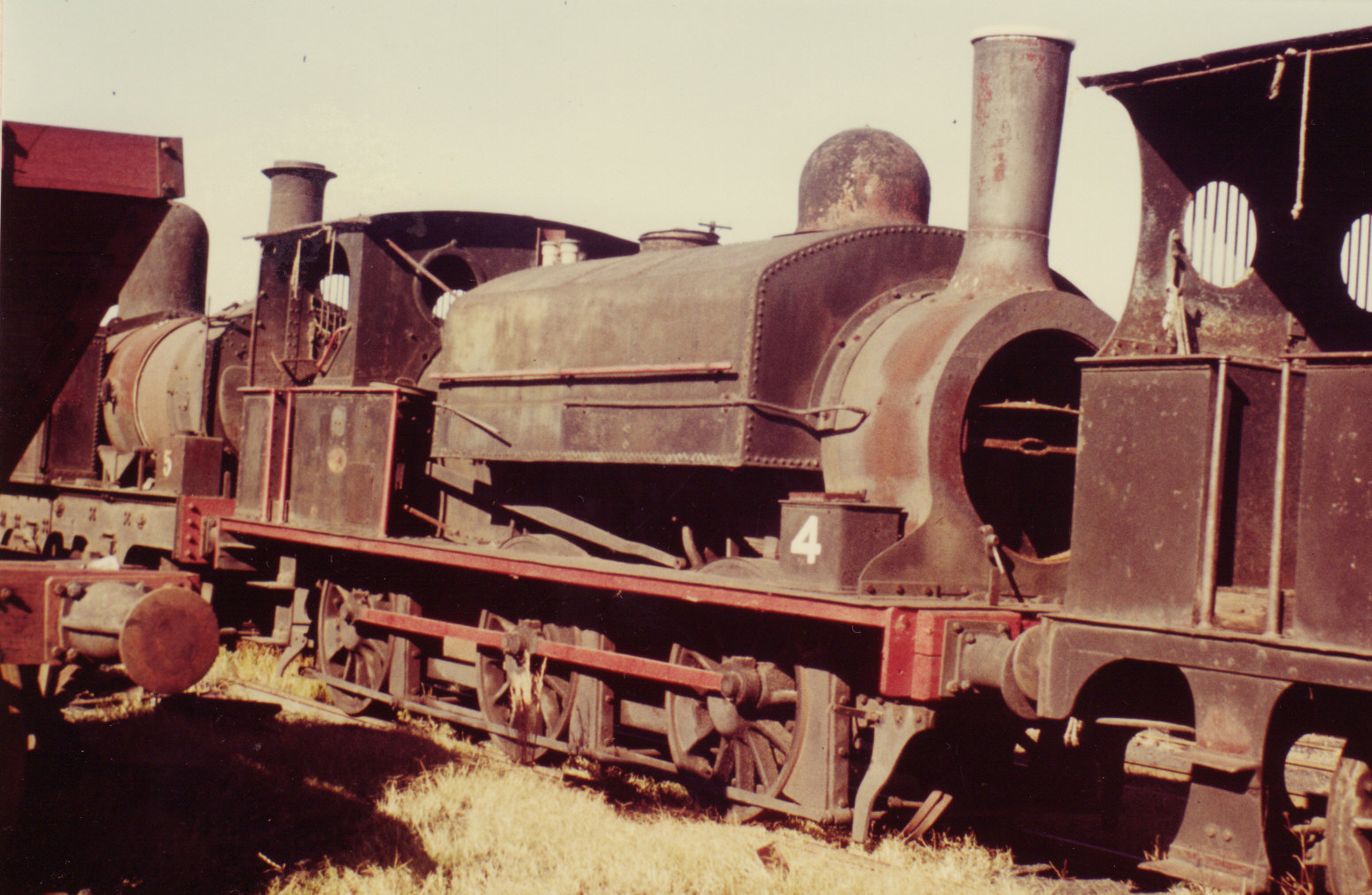
J & A Brown No.4 at Hexham, June 1973

In 1878 No. 3, an 0-6-0T saddle-tank, was purchased by J & A Brown from Kitson & Company in Leeds, England (builders No. 2236), this was similar to an engine no. 20, named "The Buck" which was also built by Kitsons (builder No. 1620), that Browns wanted to buy from the New South Wales Government Railways (NSWGR). 'The Buck', was built in 1870 and was used to haul coal on the Government Railways from Hexham to Newcastle. No. 20 was finally bought from the NSWGR in 1891 and renumbered No. 4 on Browns' roster. From the early 1920s both locomotives were being used on shunting the staithes at Hexham. No.3 remained in service until 1966 and No. 4 lasted until November 1967. Both survive, No. 3 at the Dorrigo Steam Railway & Museum and No.4 by the NSW Rail Museum and is now on display at the Newcastle Museum at the former Honeysuckle Point Railway Workshops.

=== 5-8 ===
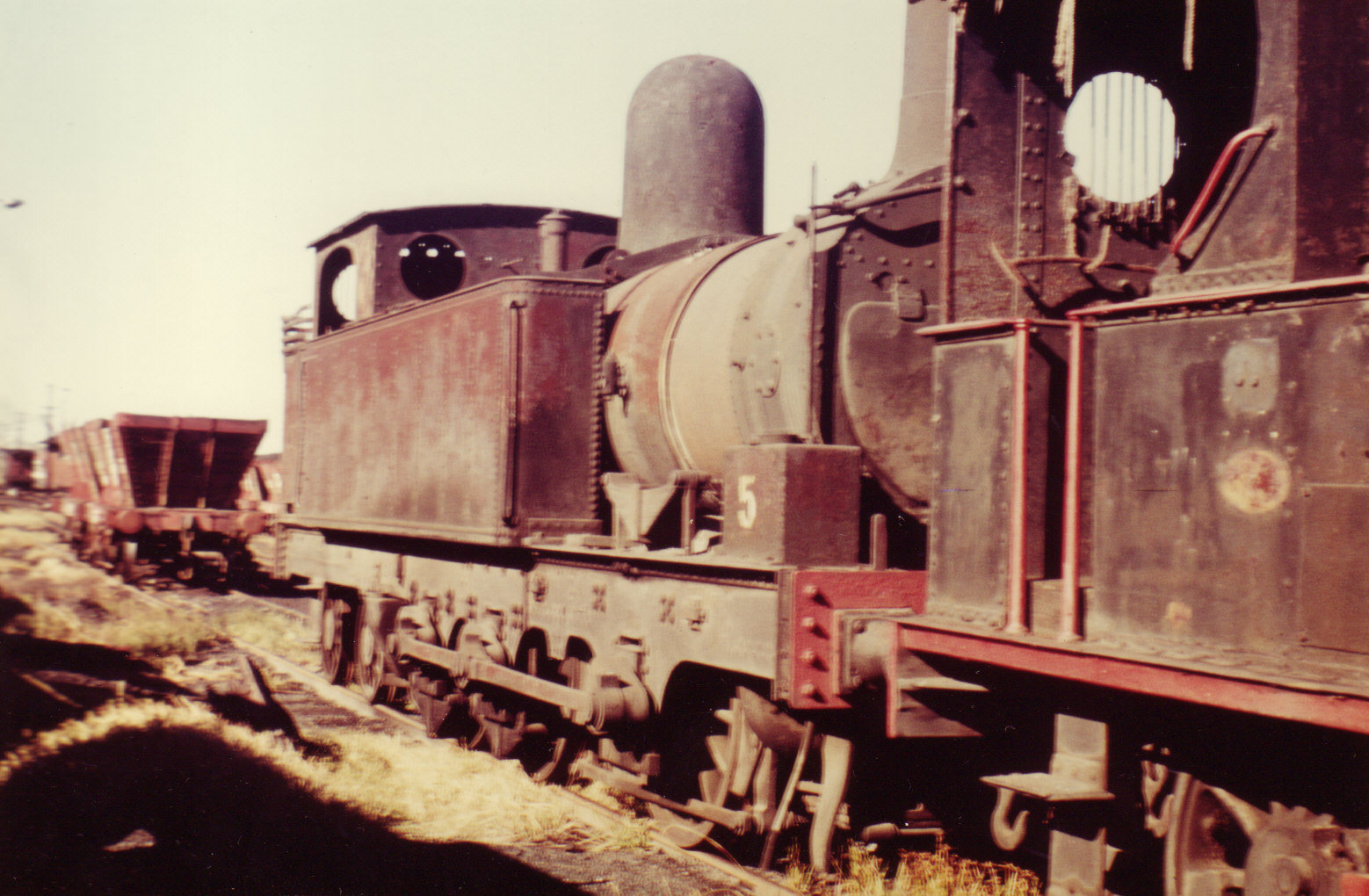
J & A Brown No.5 at Hexham, June 1973

With the Richmond Vale Railway nearing completion there was a need for larger locomotives to haul the trains over the line, John Brown purchased four large 0-6-4T side-tanks locomotives from England. These had been built by Beyer, Peacock & Company in 1885–86 for the Mersey Railway in Liverpool. The first three were purchased in 1905, with the fourth loco purchased in 1908. Before these were shipped to Australia they had their vacuum operated brakes and condensing apparatus removed, they then had enclosed cabs and steam brakes fitted. Upon arrival in Australia they were given J & A Brown Nos. 5–8 and were known as the 5 class. No. 5 was originally Mersey Railway No. 1 and was built in 1885 (builder's No. 2601) and was named The Major, No. 6 was Mersey Railway No. 7 and was built in 1886 (builder's No. 2607) and was named Liverpool, No. 7 was Mersey Railway No. 9 and was built in 1886 (builder's No.2782) and was named Connaught, No. 8 was Mersey Railway No. 4 and was built in 1885 (builder's No. 2604) and was named Gladstone. Initially Nos. 5–7 still carried their Mersey Railway nameplates whilst in J & A Brown ownership, no photographic evidence has been found of No. 8 with its nameplates intact whilst in J & A Brown service. After the introduction of the ROD locomotives the 5 class were set aside when major repairs were required. Nos. 7 and 8 had been withdrawn by 1934 and No. 6 was sold to Cessnock Collieries in 1934 for use at Kalingo Colliery. In 1936 after a period of storage No. 5 was transferred to the JABAS Abermain Colliery railway system where it remained until 1939 it was then placed in storage. In 1941 after being overhauled it was used on the Hexham to Stockrington trains until suffering boiler defects in July 1942 when it was withdrawn. No. 5 is now preserved at the NSW Rail Museum, Thirlmere. The Driving wheelset from No.8 also survives at Richmond Main.

=== 9-11 ===
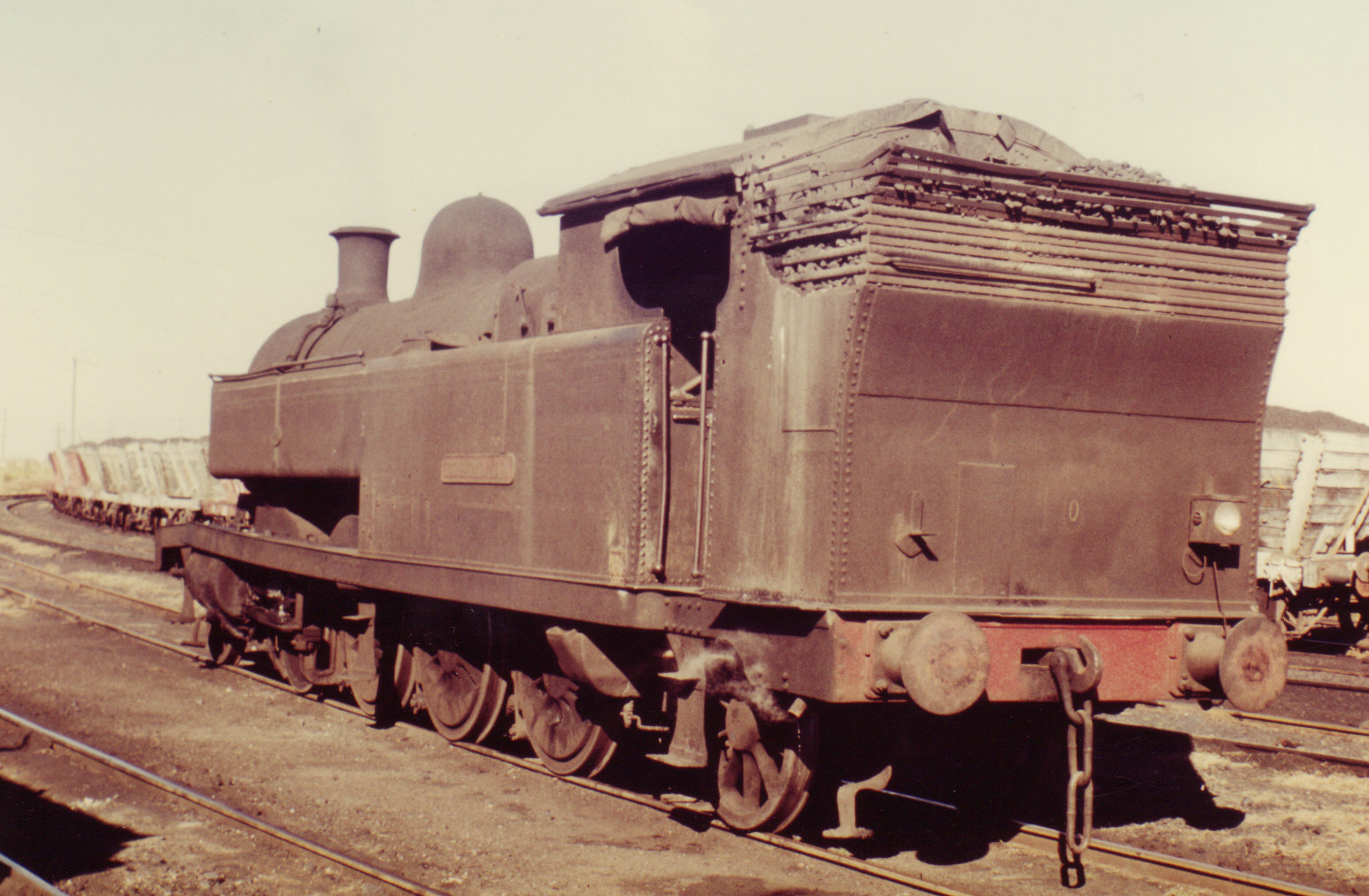
No.10 Richmond Main at Hexham, June 1973

In 1908 Kitson & Company of Leeds was asked by J & A Brown to supply a large 2-8-2T side-tank engine. This new loco was designed for Browns and was based on the Great Central Railway class 8A 0-8-0 tender engines dating from 1902 that Kitsons had built for the GCR. This loco was built in 1908 (builder's No. 4567) and was fitted with cast brass nameplates by Kitsons with the name Pelaw Main. Upon arrival this was given the number 9 and with the loco being successful and with Richmond Main Colliery undergoing development that two similar locomotives were ordered. These two were built in 1911 (builder's Nos. 4798 and 4834) and were numbered 10–11, they were also fitted with brass nameplates No. 10 carrying the name Richmond Main and No. 11 Hexham. These three were the mainstay of traffic on the RVR until the arrival of the ROD locomotives, when they were relegated to secondary duties. By the 1940s the three were being used on the Stockrington to Hexham workings. No.11 was withdrawn in 1949 and was scrapped in 1966. By 1954 Nos. 9 and 10 were standby locomotives and were only used intermittently. However, from 1969 both were used regularly in shunting the sidings at Hexham. In October 1972 both returned to main line traffic being regularly used on the Stockrington to Hexham trains. No. 9 worked until November 1980 and No. 10 worked until December 1976 and both are preserved at Richmond Main.

=== 12-24 ===
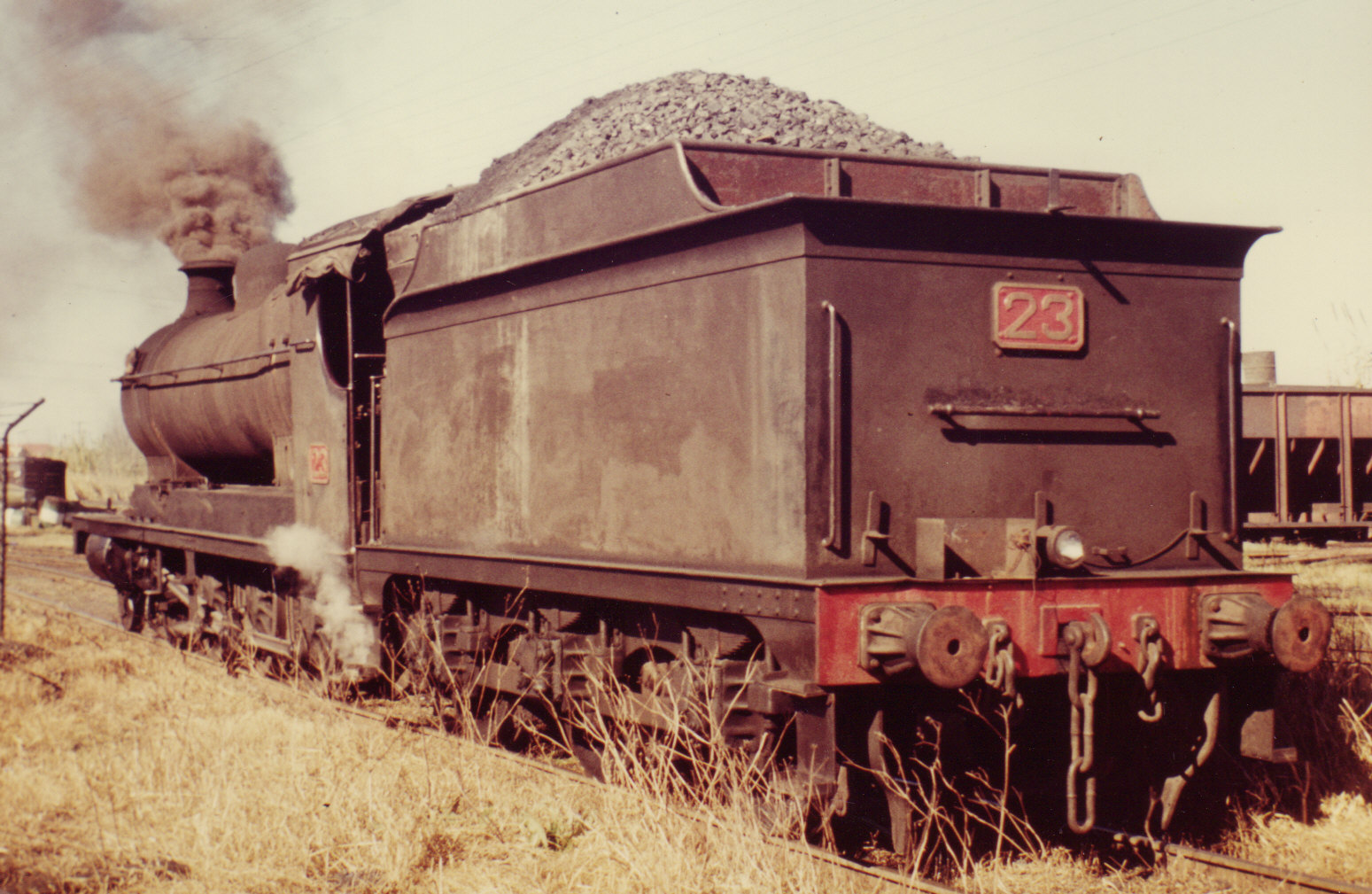
J & A Brown ROD 23 at Hexham in June 1973

These 13 locomotives were part of a class of 521 2-8-0 tender engines that were built by several locomotive builders for the Railway Operating Division (ROD) of the Royal Engineers for use in France during World War One. These locomotives were based on the pre war Great Central Railway Class 8K 2-8-0 locomotives design by John Robinson After the armistice these locomotives were surplus and J & A Brown bought 13 of these locomotives, these were built by the North British Locomotive Company (9), Kitson & Company (1) and the Great Central Railway's Gorton Works (3). These 13 were shipped to Australia over a period from March 1925 to March 1927. The first three arrived complete on the SS Boorara in February 1926. They were unloaded in Sydney and hauled to Hexham. In late 1927 the rest arrived in crates on Brown's new ship the SS Minmi on its maiden voyage to Hexham. The dismantled locomotives were gradually reassembled with the last not being reassembled until 1931. All 13 were never in service at the one time with the maximum in service at the one time being ten in 1954. The class lasted until 28 June 1973 when the last ROD in service No. 24 was withdrawn. Nos. 20 and 24 are preserved by the Dorrigo Steam Railway & Museum and No. 23 is preserved by the Richmond Vale Railway Museum.

=== 26 ===
Purchased second hand from the Sydney & Suburban Blue Metal Company's gravel quarry at Widermere in 1948 to serve the recently opened open cut at Minmi, this locomotive was former NSWGR 2-6-4T side tank loco 2013 built by Beyer, Peacock & Company, Manchester in 1885 (builder's No. 2567). Due to the condition of the locomotive it underwent a major overhaul at Hexham Workshops and when this was completed in 1949 it was transferred to Abermain instead of its intended use on Minmi Open Cut trains. It was fitted with a replacement second hand boiler obtained from Hebburn Limited in 1954. It remained at Abermain until the closure of the Abermain Collieries railway system in 1963 and was then stored at Hexham. In February 1967 it was transferred to Hebburn to replace that system's failed Robert Stephenson & Hawthorns loco. No. 26 was used intermittently on the Hebburn system until December 1967 when it was put aside, it was cut up in March 1970 at Hebburn No. 1 Colliery.

=== 3013 ===
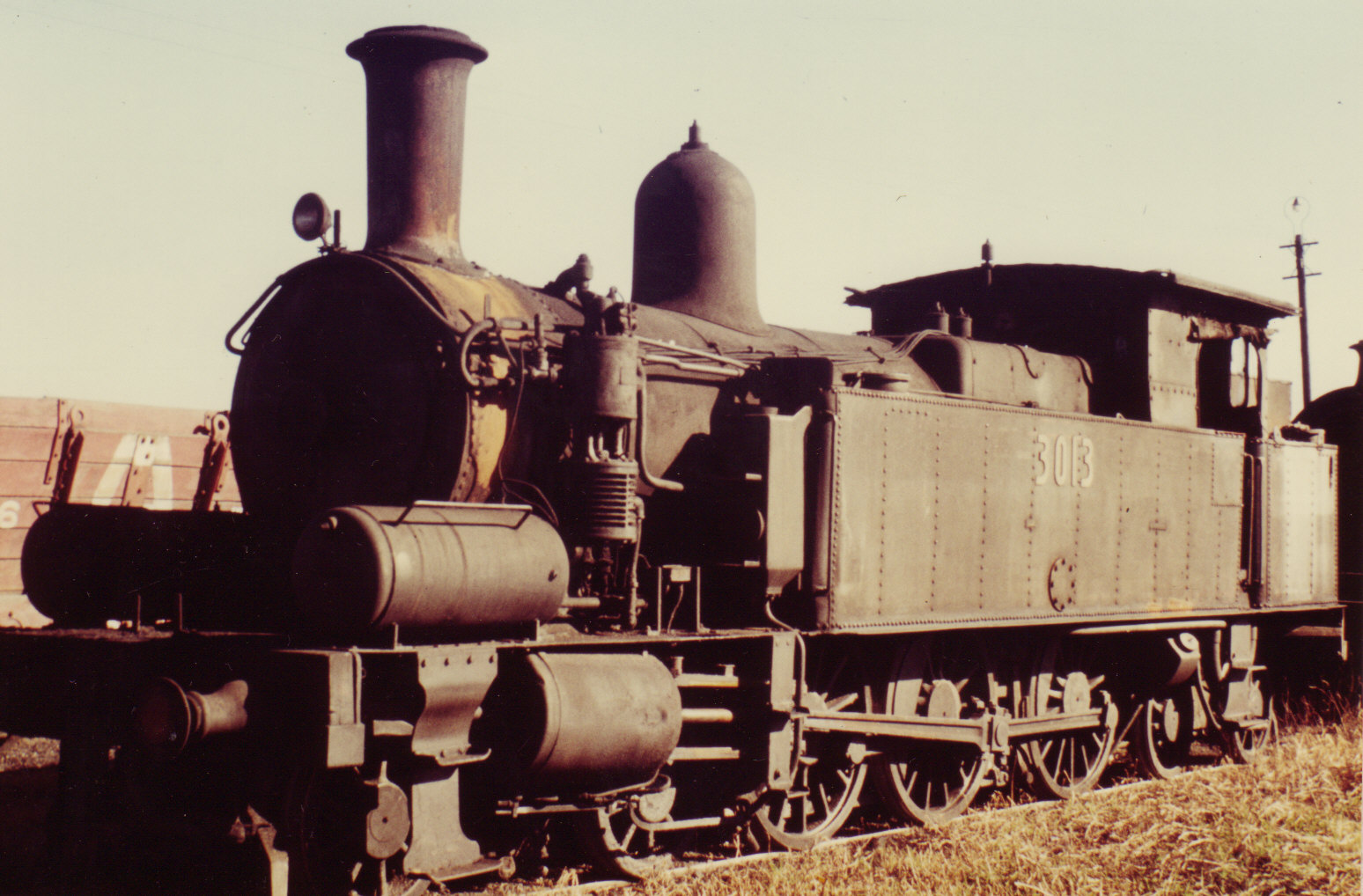
Ex NSWGR 4-6-4T 3013 at Hexham in June 1973

Due to problems experienced with No. 26 whilst at Hebburn that required the hiring of a South Maitland Railways locomotive and since that SMR was short of locomotives due to the state of their loco fleet at the time, JABAS purchased 4-6-4T 3013 from the NSWGR. This locomotive was built by Beyer, Peacock & Company in 1903 (builder's No. 4456). It was delivered to Hebburn Colliery at Weston on 15 May 1967, where it remained until the closure of Hebburn No. 2 Colliery in June 1972 when it was transferred to Hexham on 12 July 1972. It was regularly used on duties at Hexham until the arrival of the second SMR Ten class loco in May 1973, when it was used mainly on standby duties until being stored in 1976. In 1981 the loco was sold to the Lachlan Valley Railway, where it was dismantled for overhaul. In October 2009 the dismantled loco was transferred to the Canberra Railway Museum.

=== Abermain 1-2 ===
These two 0-6-0T saddle tank locomotives were built by the Avonside Engine Company for the Abermain Coal Company No. 1 in 1911 (builder's No. 1606) and No. 2 in 1922 (builder's No. 1916) for use on the Abermain Collieries rail system between Abermain Nos. 2 and 3 Collieries and the exchange sidings with the SMR at Abermain No. 1 Colliery. Upon the formation of JABAS in 1931 these two kept their original road numbers and were known as "Abermain No. 1 and 2". The two remained on the Abermain system other than when being transferred to Hexham Workshops for overhaul, and their return to Abermain. In 1955 No. 1 loco was transferred to Hexham mainly for use in servicing the new coal preparation plant. It was withdrawn in 1961 after a suffering a burnt boiler and was scrapped in 1966. No. 2 loco was transferred to Hexham in December 1963 after the closure of the rail line servicing Abermain No. 2 Colliery. At Hexham it was used to service the coal preparation plant and the coal staithes until 1969 when it was withdrawn, in June 1973 it was sold to the Hunter Valley Steam Railway and Museum.

=== South Maitland Railways 10 Class ===
The first of the fourteen 10 class was supplied to the East Greta Coal Mining Company in 1912 by Beyer, Peacock & Company. In the following years the remaining locomotives were supplied to both the East Greta Coal Mining Co. and its successor South Maitland Railways Pty Ltd with the last arriving in 1926. They were used on coal haulage over the South Maitland system between the various collieries at Cessnock and the transfer point with the government railways at East Greta Junction at Maitland.

In 1973 with the remaining ROD locomotives at Hexham due for withdrawal from service and with South Maitland Railways being a fully owned subsidiary of Coal & Allied since 1967, two 10 class were transferred to Hexham. After the withdrawal of No. 9 Pelaw Main in 1980 a third 10 class was transferred to Hexham. After the replacing of steam on the SMR by State Rail Authority diesels in June 1983 a fourth 10 class was allocated to Hexham to work the Richmond Vale Railway. All 14 worked on the surviving section of the RVR between Hexham and Stockrington at various times. All fourteen survive.

== The line today ==
Of the once extensive system, only the relaid former passenger line (Richmond Main-Pelaw Main) and a short section of the line towards Stockrington (Richmond Main-Leggetts Drive) remains, used for tourist trains by the Richmond Vale Railway Museum. The vast majority of the alignment is in situ, and all three tunnels (in impressive condition) and two bridges (dilapidated) are intact. The alignment has been encroached just opposite Leggetts Drive by a private landing strip, and near No. 2 Tunnel by a mining access road, where the cutting has been filled. Some track is still in place across Hexham Swamp and at the former Stockrington Colliery site, though unusable.

There are still some physical remnants along the route, the aforementioned bridges and tunnels being the most recognisable. There are two dilapidated buildings remaining at the Hexham site, though not much else remains there. It has been suggested that one or some non-air wagons are sitting in a dilapidated state in the former Stockrington sidings, though this is yet to be confirmed.

The Richmond Vale Railway and Mining Museum currently occupies the former Richmond Main Colliery, and operates trains on the former passenger line from Richmond Main to Pelaw Main. The Museum is custodian of a number of historic locomotives and items of rolling stock.

== Future proposals ==
There was a proposal for a new freight and coal line to bypass the Newcastle urban area. The line would branch off the Main Northern railway line at Cockle Creek to join the Richmond Vale line near Seahampton, then use the northern (Stockrington-Minmi Junction-Hexham) part of the old Richmond Vale railway to connect to the main government line at Hexham. The line is now being developed to form the Richmond Vale Rail Trail which will provide over 32 km (20 mi) of cycle/pedestrian paths linking Hexham to Kurri Kurri and beyond.

== Richmond Vale Preservation Co-operative Society ==
After the closure of Richmond Main Power Station in 1976, Cessnock City Council acquired the abandoned Richmond Main Colliery site. In 1979 the Richmond Vale Preservation Co-operative Society was formed with the aim of preserving the industrial railway heritage of the Hunter Valley. Based at the Richmond Main site they commenced relaying the rails at the colliery along with the former passenger line to Pelaw Main Colliery and trade as the Richmond Vale Railway Museum.

== Coordinates ==
- 32°49′39″S 151°40′53″E – Hexham Junction
- 32°51′25″S 151°36′57″E – loop
- 32°51′33″S 151°36′17″E – Millers Siding
- 32°52′45″S 151°34′43″E – Richmond Vale No 1 Tunnel
- 32°52′38″S 151°33′54″E – Sugarloaf Tunnel
- 32°51′16″S 151°31′24″E – Richmond Vale No 3 Tunnel
- 32°51′05″S 151°30′49″E – Wallis Creek
