= NS 6000 =

Dutch class of railway locomotives

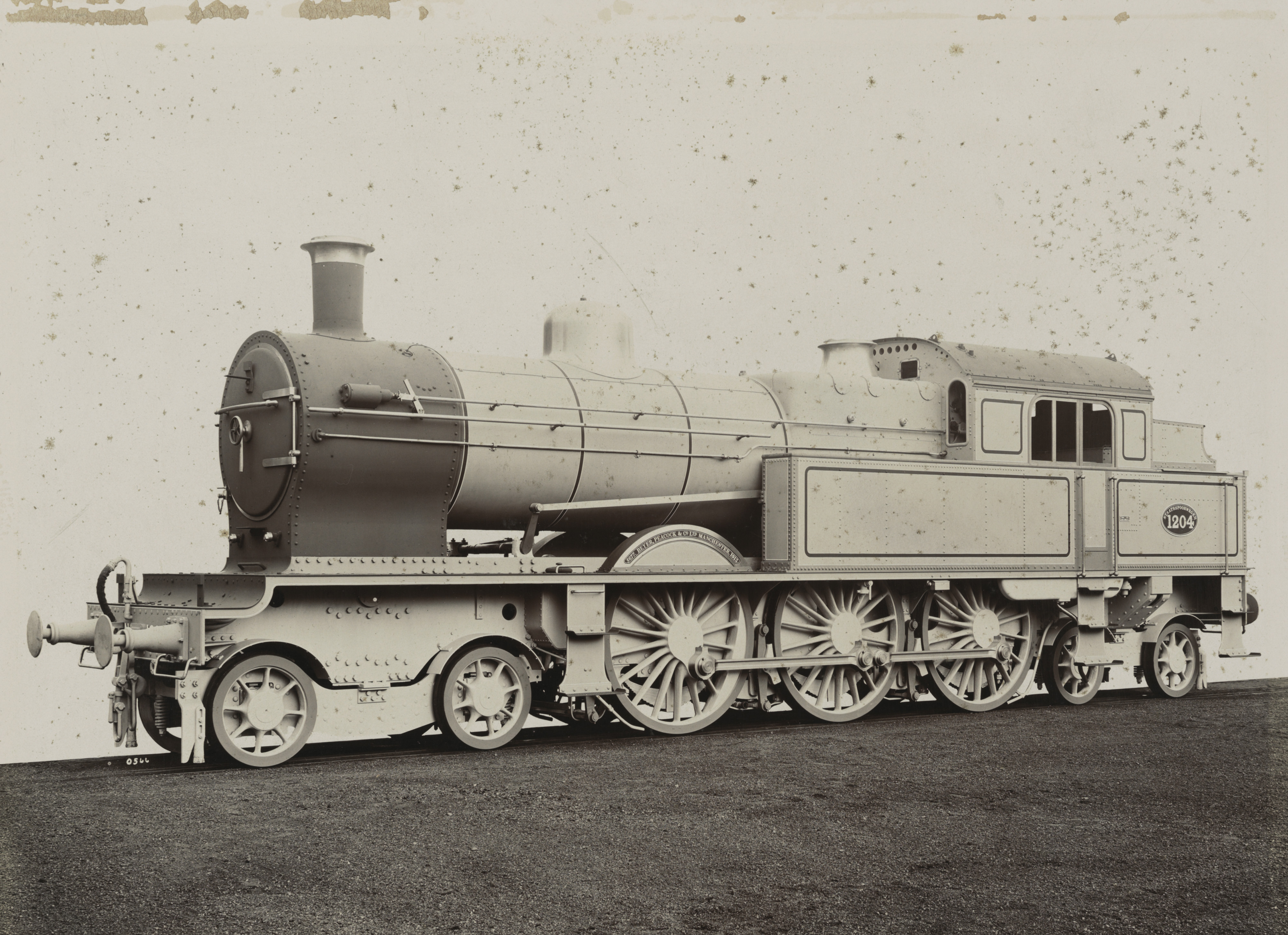
- SS 1204 - NS 6004
Type and origin
- Power type: Steam
- Builder: Beyer, Peacock & Company
- Build date: 1913 - 1916
- Total produced: 26
Specifications
- Configuration
  - Whyte: 4-6-4
  - UIC: 2′C2′ h2t
- Gauge: 1,435 mm (4 ft 8 1/2 in)
- Leading dia.: 915 mm (3 ft 0 in)
- Driver dia.: 1,850 mm (6 ft 1 in)
- Length: 14,625 mm (47 ft 11.8 in)
- Height: 4,520 mm (14 ft 10 in)
- Loco weight: 93 t (103 short tons; 92 long tons)
- Fuel type: Coal
- Fuel capacity: 3 t (3.3 short tons; 3.0 long tons)
- Water cap.: 6001 - 6006: 8.18 m^{3} (1,800 imp gal); 6007 - 6026: 9.0 m^{3} (2,000 imp gal)
- Firebox
  - Grate area: 2.40 m^{2} (25.8 sq ft)
- Boiler pressure: 12 kg/cm^{2} (170 psi)
- Heating surface
  - Firebox: 13.5 m^{2} (145 sq ft)
  - Tubes: 108 m^{2} (1,160 sq ft)
- Superheater
  - Heating area: 34 m^{2} (370 sq ft)
- Cylinders: 2
- Cylinder size: 508 mm × 660 mm (20.0 in × 26.0 in)
- Valve gear: Walschaerts
Performance figures
- Maximum speed: 100 km/h (62 mph)
- Tractive effort: 7,750 kgf (17,100 lbf)
Career
- Operators: NS
- Power class: PTO^{3}
- Numbers: 6001 - 6026
- Nicknames: Blokken (Blocks)
- Withdrawn: 1957
- Disposition: All scrapped

The NS 6000 was a series of tank engines with the wheel arrangement of 2′C2′ of the Dutch Railways (NS) and its predecessor Maatschappij tot Exploitatie van Staatsspoorwegen (SS). They were manufactured by Beyer, Peacock & Company in Manchester, England.

== History ==
Around 1912, the Maatschappij tot Exploitatie van Staatsspoorwegen had their first experience with the new and strong 2′C locomotives of the series 700, but there was a need for a tank engine version of the series 700; however, this was not possible because it would have been heavier than the maximum axle load of sixteen tons. The SS built the 2′C2′ locomotives with less tractive effort than the series 700 and with only two inside cylinders, but with features quite similar to the Series 700, such as the copper-capped chimney, the copper steam dome, the wheel diameter and the maximum boiler pressure.Thus it was considered that Beyer, Peacock & Company had built a very robust yet elegant locomotive.

== Railway Operating Division ==
Due to the outbreak of World War I in July 1914, only 26 of the 40 locomotives ordered were delivered to the SS. The remaining 14 locomotives have been seized by the Railway Operating Division. This was part of the British War Department. The locomotives were sent to France for the benefit of the Allied armies. After the war, the Chemins de fer du Nord purchased all 14 examples which became 3.871 to 3.884.

== Fleet list ==
Lot No.	Entered service	SS number	NS number	Withdrawn	Notes
5674	September 1913	1201	6001	1954	
5675	September 1913	1202	6002	1955	
5676	September 1913	1203	6003	1955	
5677	October 1913	1204	6004	1947	
5678	October 1913	1205	6005	1954	
5679	December 1913	1206	6006	1957	
5843	August 1914	1207	6007	1947	
5844	August 1914	1208	6008	1957	
5845	August 1914	1209	6009	1947	
5846	August 1914	1210	6010	1947	
5847	August 1914	1211	6011	1954	
5848	August 1914	1212	6012	1957	
5849	5 November 1915	1213	6013	1957	
5850	5 November 1915	1214	6014	1955	
5851	5 November 1915	1215	6015	1957	
5852	22 October 1915	1216	6016	1947	
5853	22 October 1915	1217	6017	1956	
5854	23 September 1915	1218	6018	1955	
5855	3 August 1915	1219	6019	1957	
5856					Seized by the Railway Operating Division
5857					Seized by the Railway Operating Division
5858					Seized by the Railway Operating Division
5859	4 January 1916	1223	6020	1954	
5860	11 December 1915	1224	6021	1954	
5861	30 July 1915	1225	6022	1957	
5862					Seized by the Railway Operating Division
5863					Seized by the Railway Operating Division
5864					Seized by the Railway Operating Division
5865					Seized by the Railway Operating Division
5866					Seized by the Railway Operating Division
5867	3 September 1915	1231	6023	1955	
5868				1954	Seized by the Railway Operating Division
5869				1954	Seized by the Railway Operating Division
5870				1954	Seized by the Railway Operating Division
5871				1954	Seized by the Railway Operating Division
5872				1954	Seized by the Railway Operating Division
5873				1954	Seized by the Railway Operating Division
5874	9 August 1915	1238	6024	1954	
5875	31 August 1915	1239	6025	1956	
5876	6 January 1916	1240	6026	1947	

Locomotives that were taken by the ROD
Lot No.	Built	SS No.	ROD No.	Nord No.	SNCF No.	Withdrawn	Notes
5857	1914	1221	1	3.871	232TB1	02-1950	
5856	1914	1220	2	3.872	232TB2	12-1951	
5871	1914	1235	3	3.883	232TB13	06-1950	
5866	1914	1230	4	3.873	232TB3	05-1946	
5873	1914	1237	5	3.874	232TB4	04-1952	
5872	1914	1236	6	3.875	232TB5	02-1954	Last locomotive of this series to be withdrawn in France
5863	1914	1227	7	3.876	232TB6	02-1950	
5869	1914	1233	8	3.877	232TB7	12-1951	
5868	1914	1232	9	3.884	232TB14	05-1946	
5858	1914	1222	10	3.878	232TB8	02-1951	
5870	1914	1234	11	3.879	232TB9	12-1951	
5862	1914	1226	12	3.880	232TB10	02-1950	
5864	1914	1228	14	3.881	232TB11	02-1950	
5865	1914	1229	15	3.882	232TB12	12-1950	

== Gallery ==
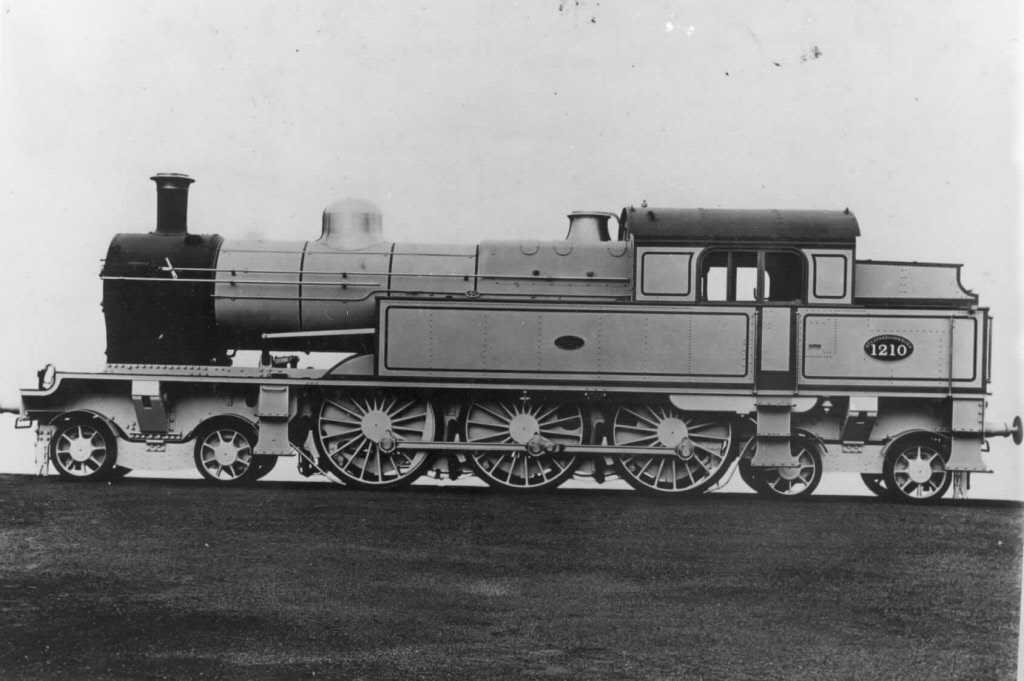
SS No. 1210 later renumbered to NS No. 6010

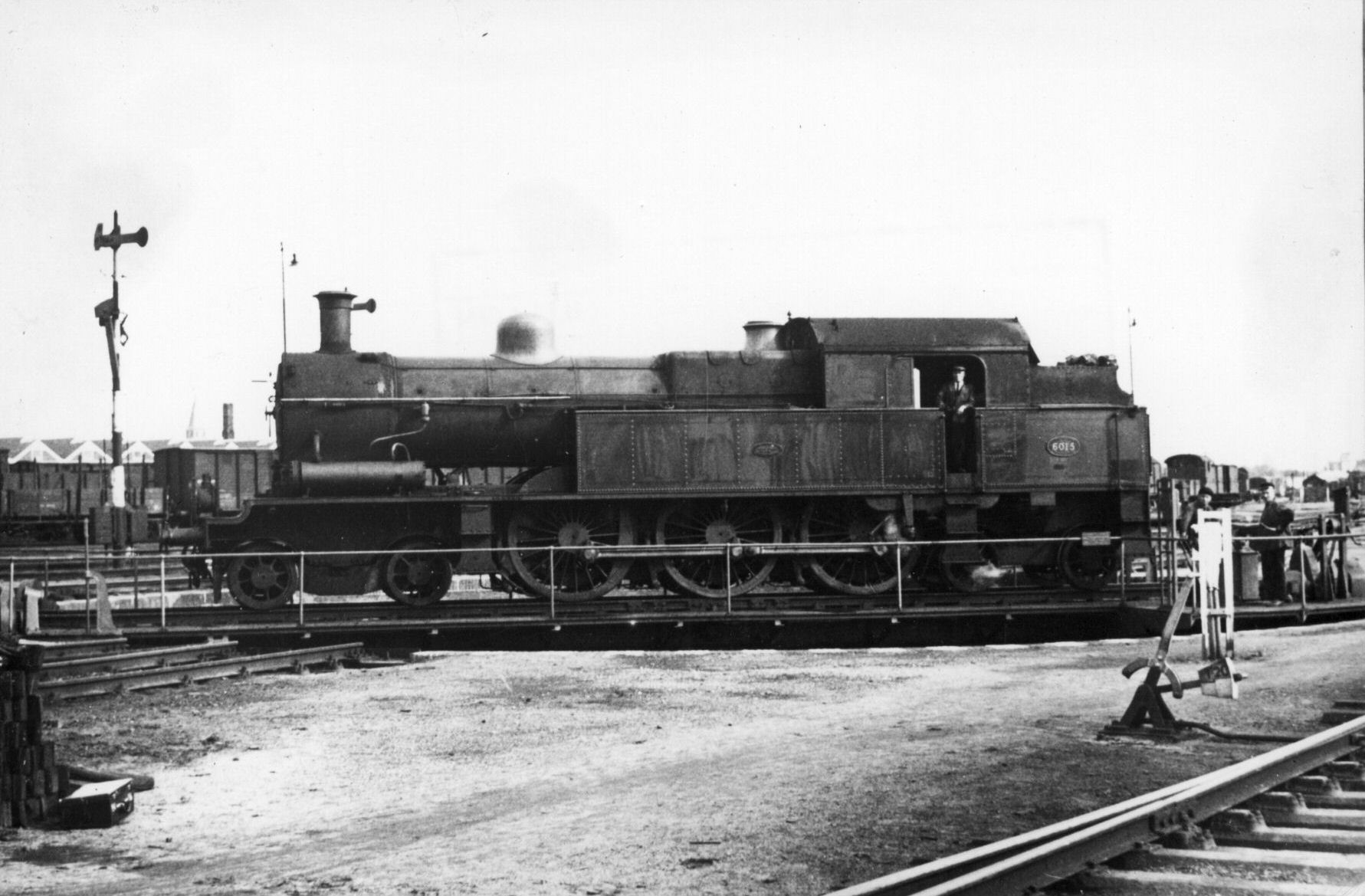
NS 6015 on the turntable in Amersfoort. (Between 1930 and 1939)

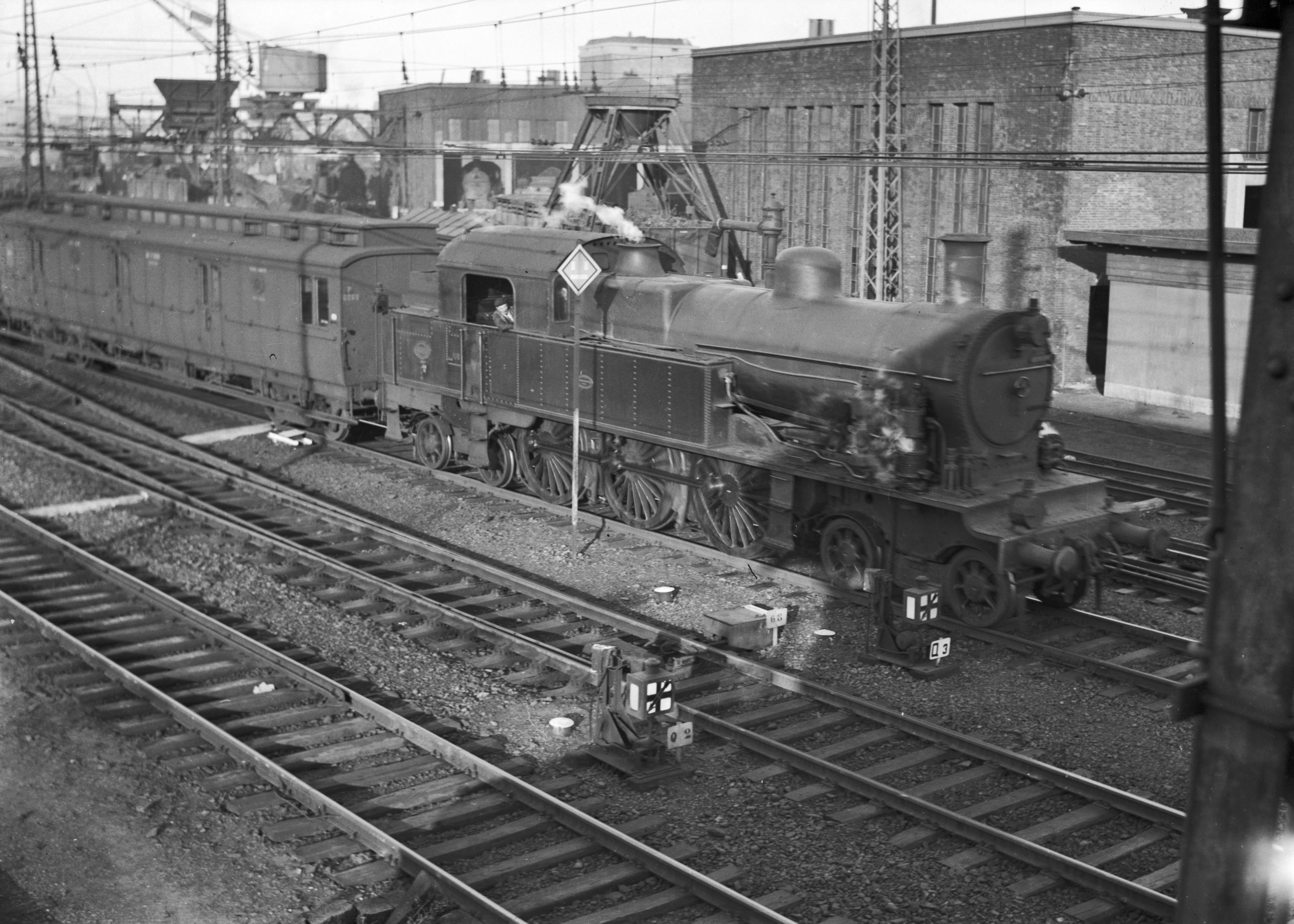
An NS 6000 with carriages near the yard on the east side of Amsterdam C.S. (13-12-1940)

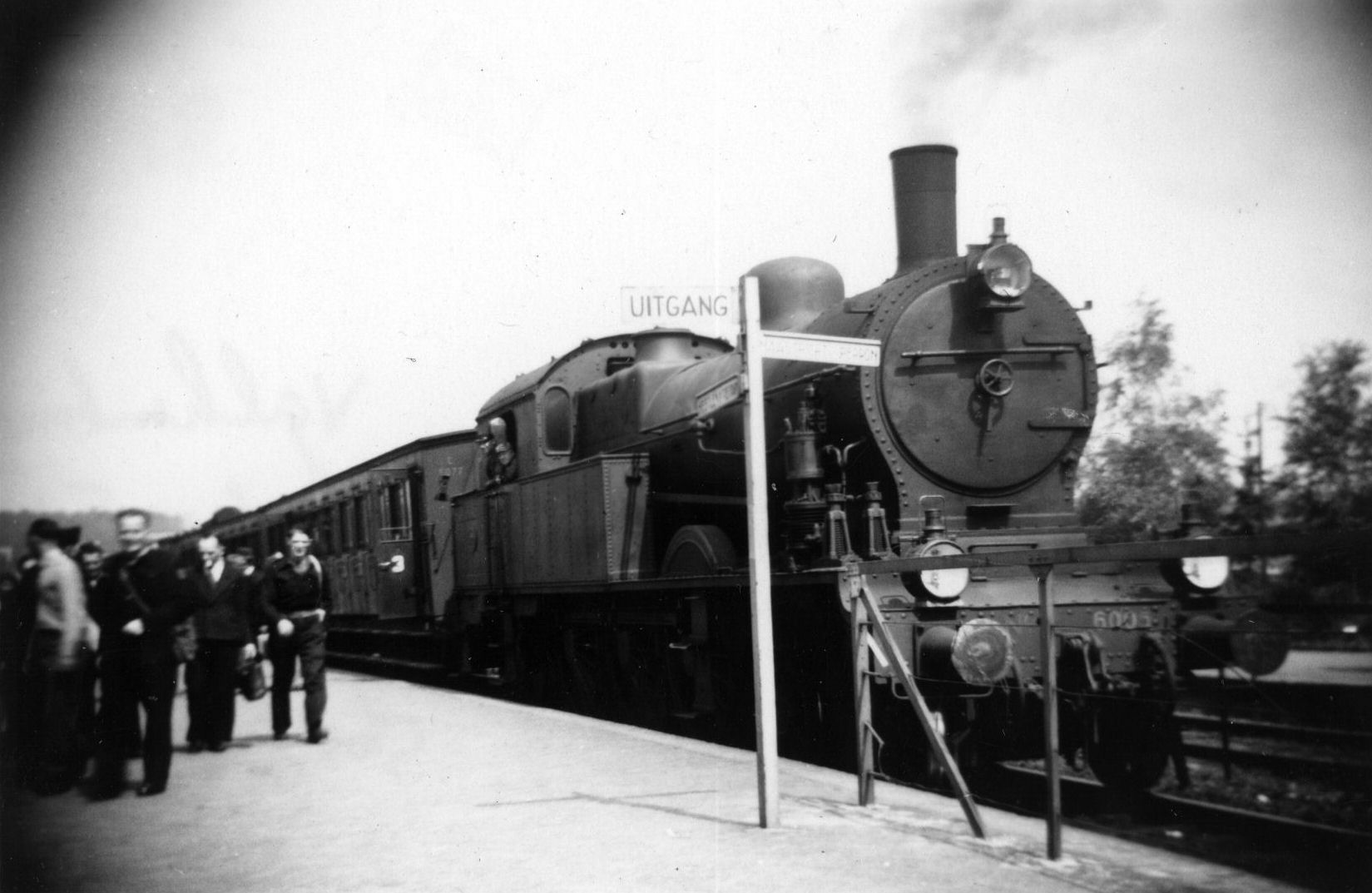
NS 6005 with a train along the platform of Valkenburg station. (03-07-1947)

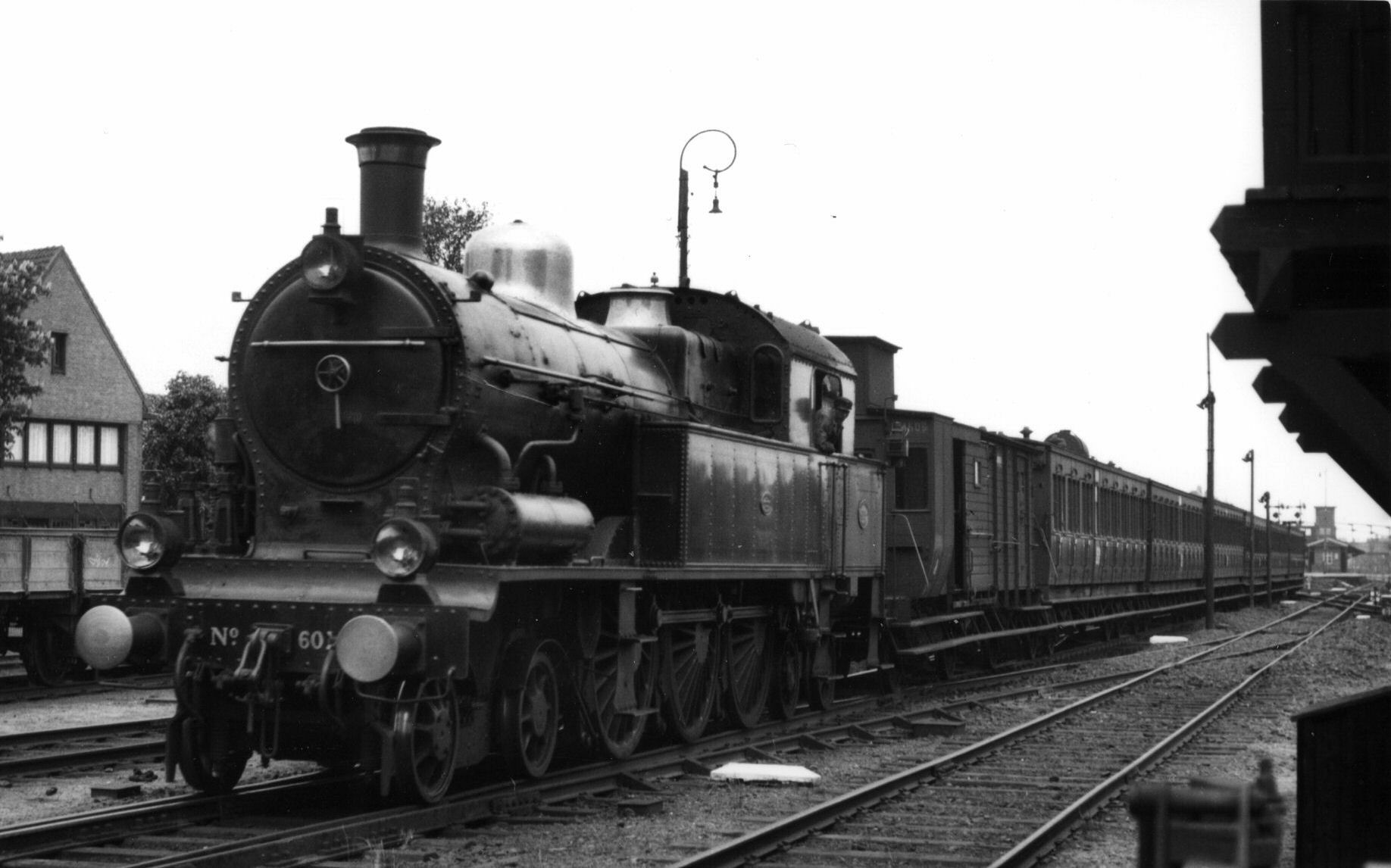
NS 6015 with a train in Hilversum. (June 1935)

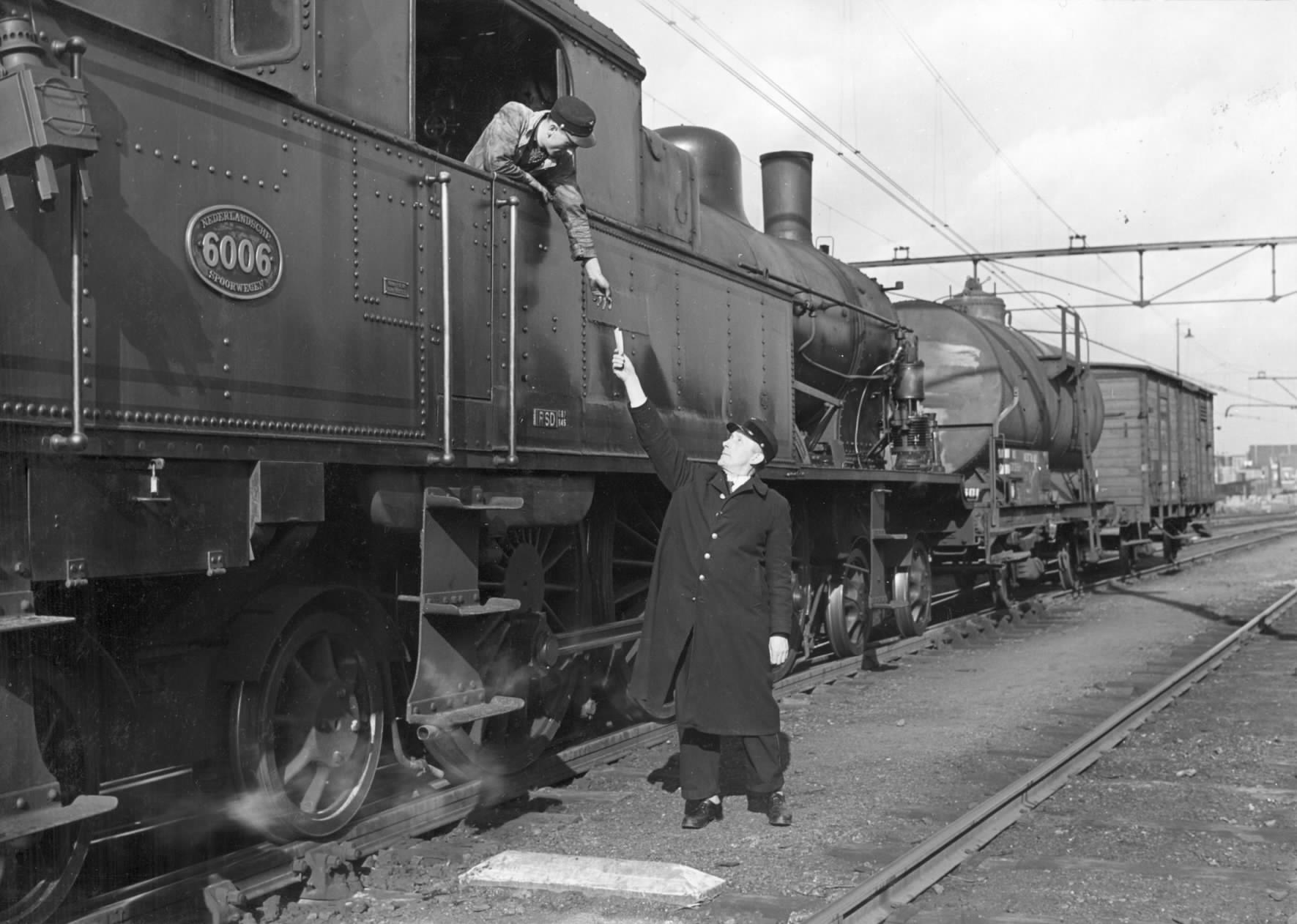
NS 6006 during shunting at the yard in Roosendaal (1950)

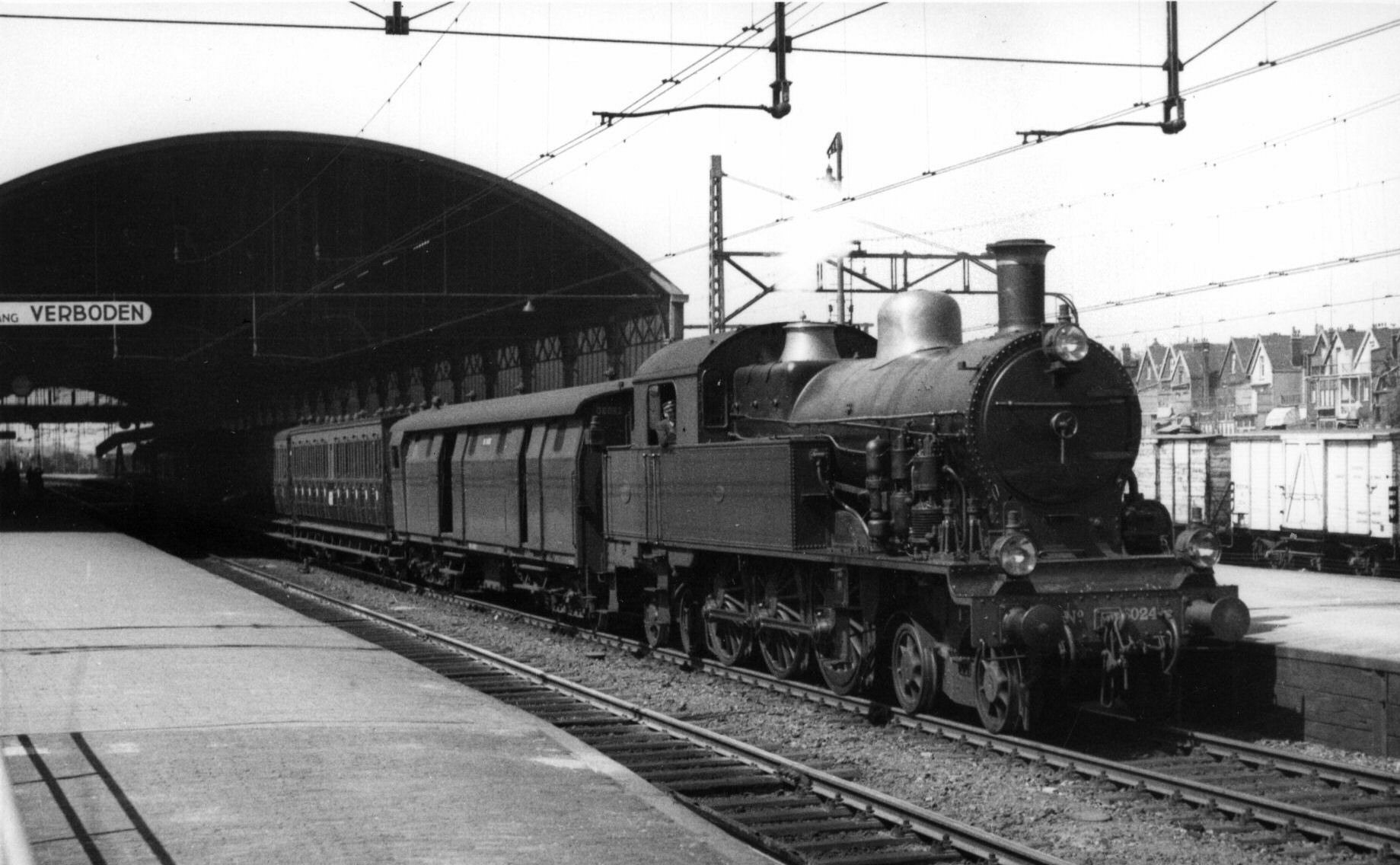
NS 6024 with a train to Roosendaal at Rotterdam D.P. station. (May 1935)

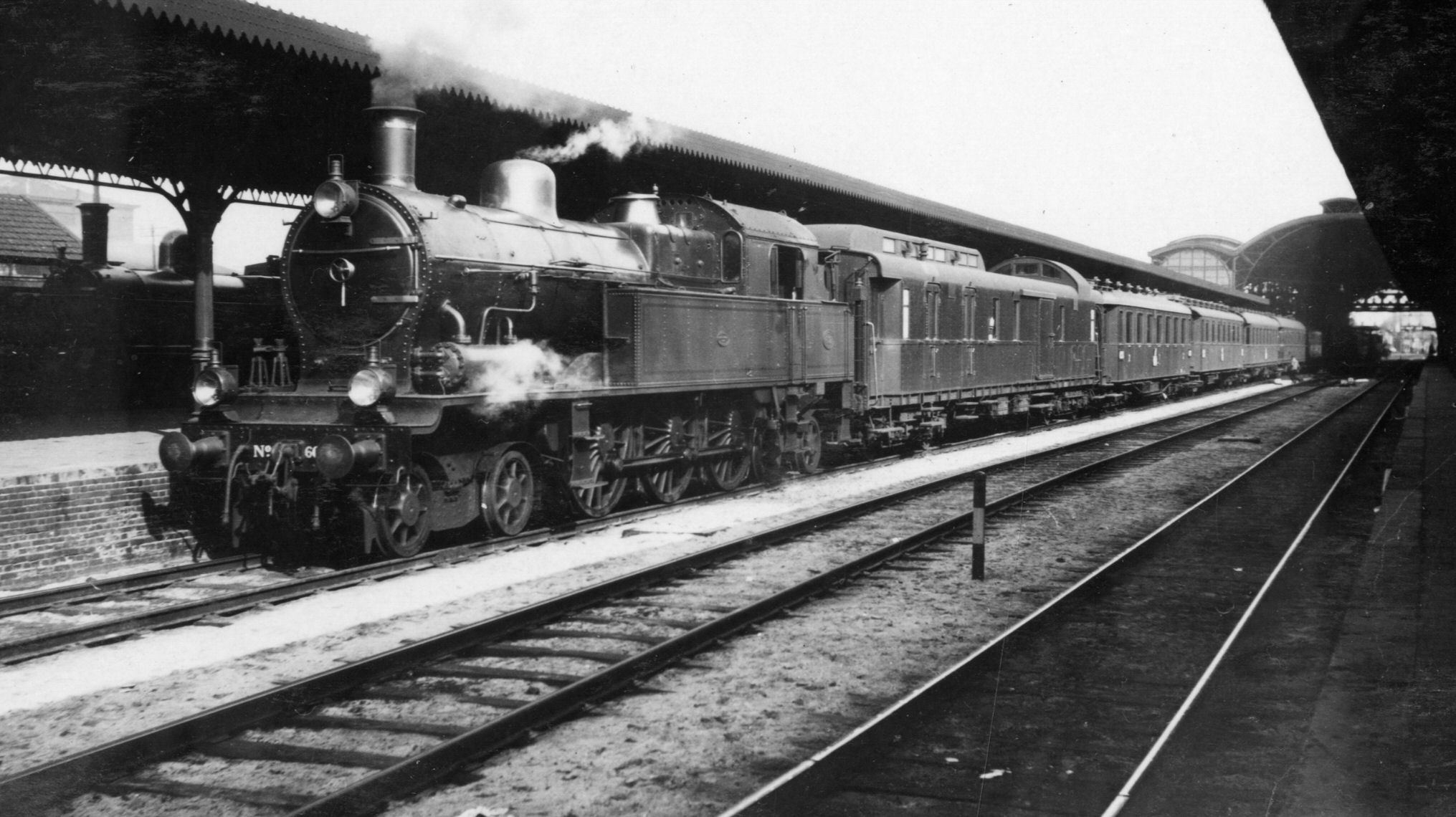
NS 6021 with train D111 from Hoek van Holland along the platform of Utrecht C.S. (Between 1925 and 1935)

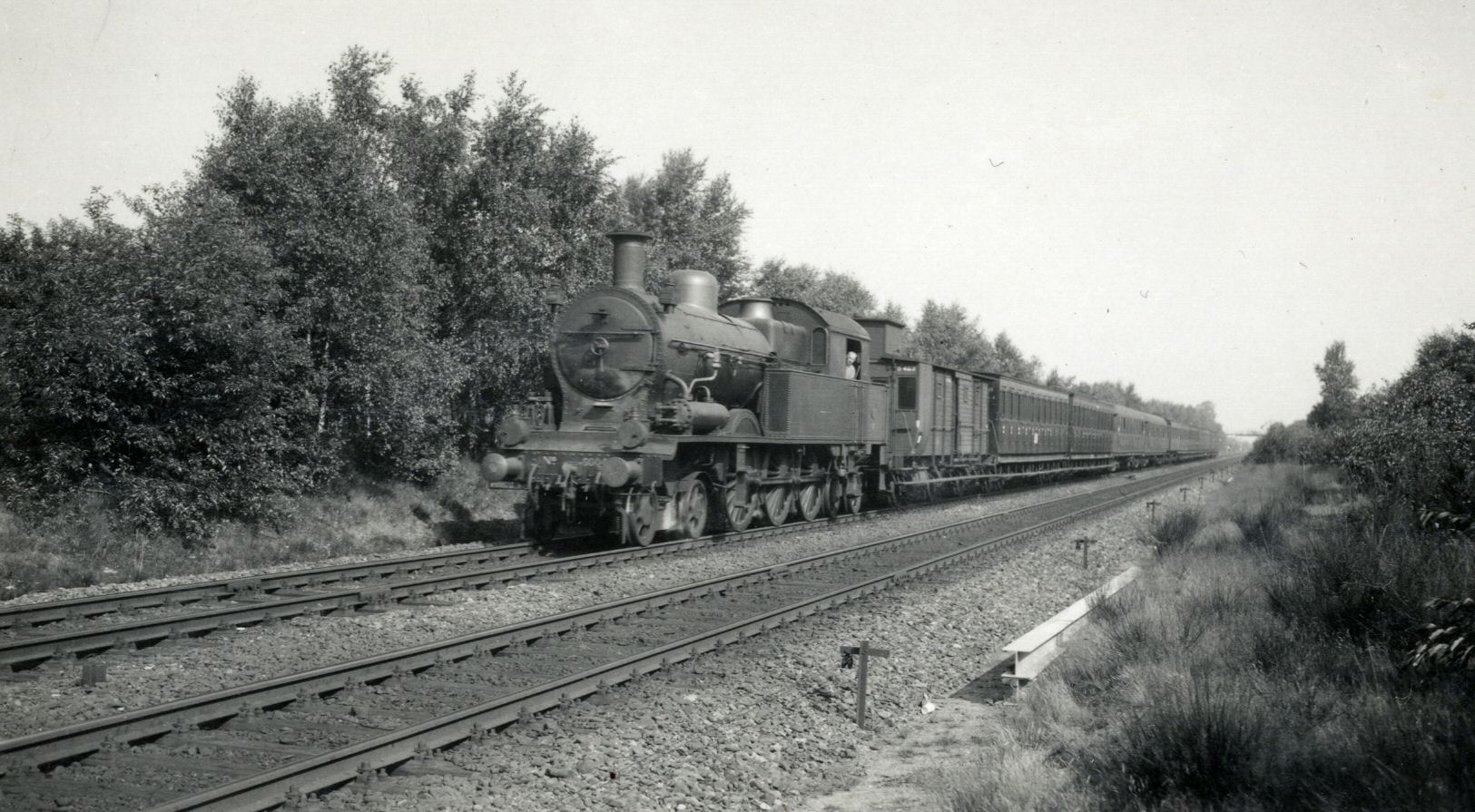
NS 6004 with a train near Crailoo. (Between 1940 and 1941)

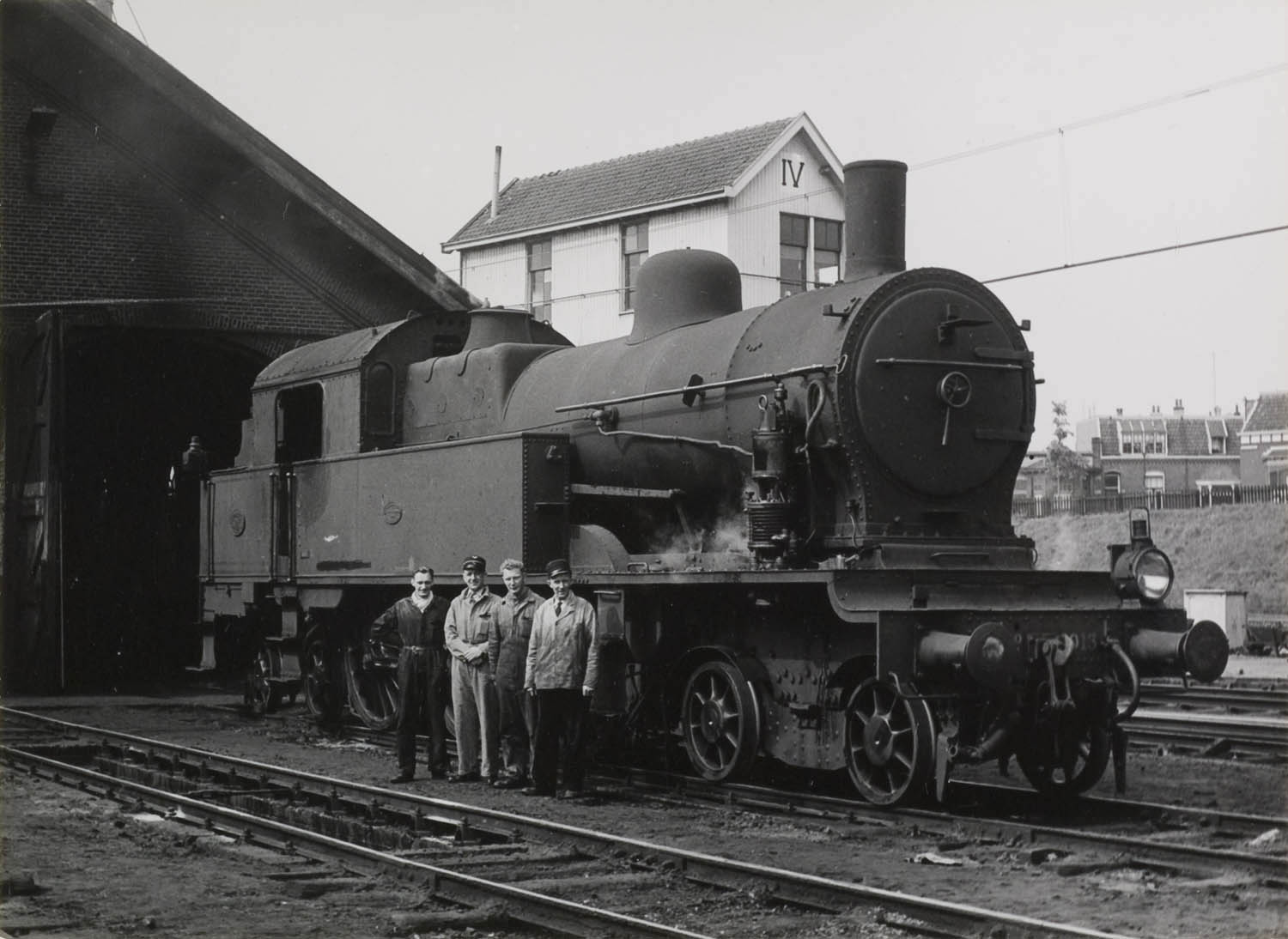
NS 6013 just before the locomotive was scrapped (27-05-1957)
