= GWR 3000 Class =

Class of British steam locomotives

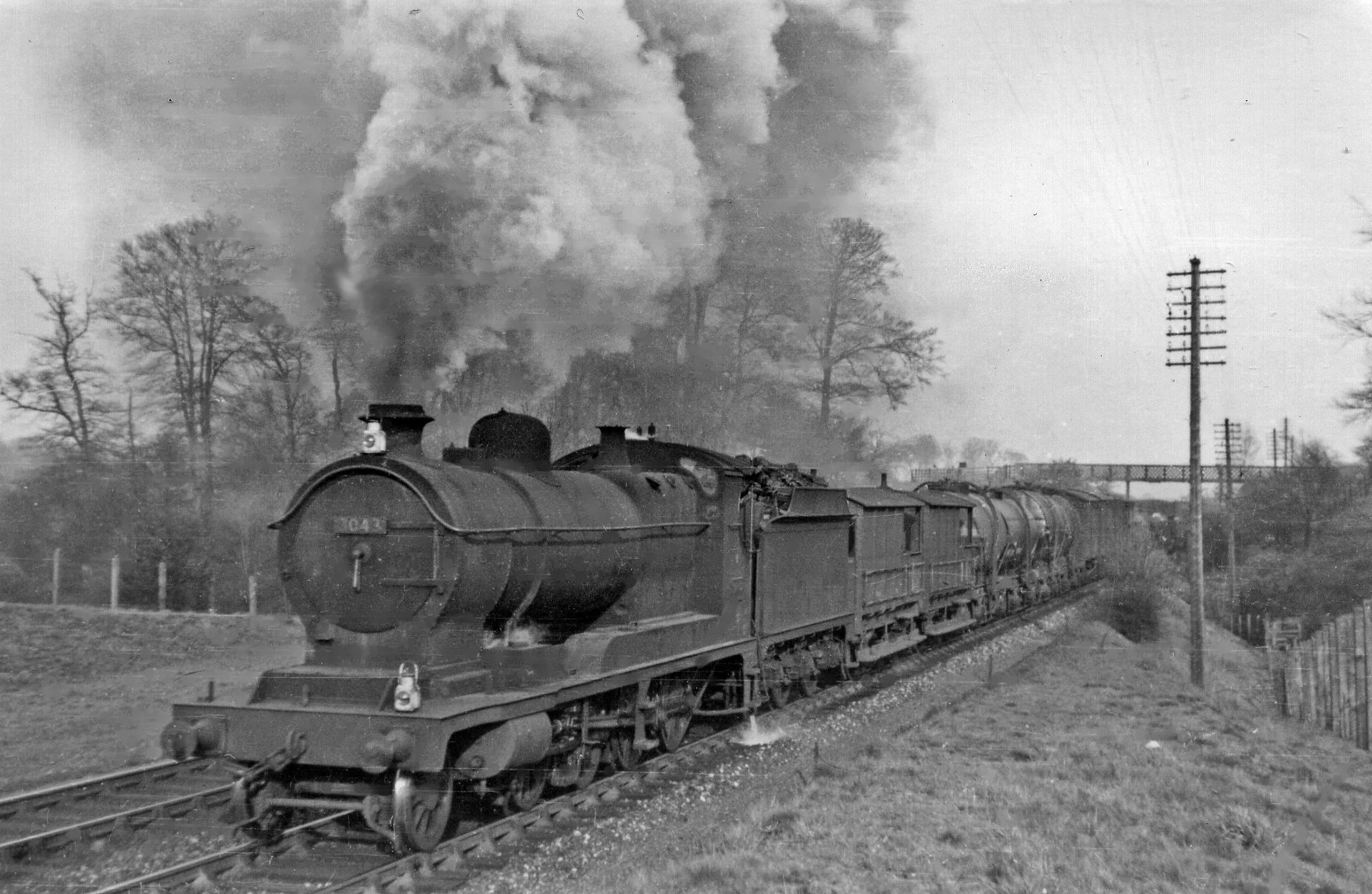
- 3043 at Seer Green in 1950
Type and origin
- Power type: Steam
- Build date: 1917-1918 (built for the ROD) 1919-1925 (purchased)
- Total produced: 100
Specifications
- Configuration
  - Whyte: 2-8-0
- Gauge: 4 ft 8 1/2 in (1,435 mm) standard gauge
- Leading dia.: 3 ft 6 in (1.067 m)
- Driver dia.: 4 ft 8 in (1.422 m)
- Length: 61 ft 9 in (18.82 m)
- Width: 8 ft 9 1/2 in (2.680 m)
- Height: 13 ft 5 1/4 in (4.096 m)
- Axle load: 17 long tons 2 cwt (38,300 lb or 17.4 t) (17.4 t; 19.2 short tons) full
- Adhesive weight: 66 long tons 8 cwt (148,700 lb or 67.5 t) (67.5 t; 74.4 short tons) full
- Loco weight: 73 long tons 11 cwt (164,800 lb or 74.7 t) (74.7 t; 82.4 short tons) full
- Fuel type: Coal
- Water cap.: 4,000 imp gal (18,000 L; 4,800 US gal)
- Firebox
  - Grate area: 26.07 sq ft (2.422 m^{2})
- Boiler pressure: 185 lbf/in^{2} (1.28 MPa)
- Heating surface
  - Firebox: 153.19 sq ft (14.232 m^{2})
  - Tubes: 1,591.38 sq ft (147.844 m^{2})
- Superheater
  - Type: 6-element
  - Heating area: 6-element: 225.12 sq ft (20.914 m^{2})
- Cylinders: Two, outside
- Cylinder size: 21 in × 26 in (533 mm × 660 mm)
Performance figures
- Tractive effort: 32,197 lbf (143.22 kN)
Career
- Operators: GWR » BR
- Numbers: 3000-3099, 6000-6003
- Withdrawn: 1929-1958
- Disposition: All Scrapped

The Great Western Railway (GWR) 3000 Class was a class of 2-8-0 steam locomotive consisting of the ex-Railway Operating Division ROD 2-8-0. These were built by North British Locomotive Co. between 1917 and 1918. No examples have been preserved.

== Initial loans and purchase ==
The GWR borrowed several ROD 2-8-0s during the First World War but these were returned to the government after the end of the war. In 1919, GWR bought 20 virtually new RODs, and numbered them 3000–19. A further 84 were hired in July 1919, and were numbered 3020-99 and 6000–3, but these were returned in October 1922. In 1925, the GWR bought 80 engines (including some previously hired) and numbered them 3020–99.

== Overhaul and sorting ==
In 1926/7 the GWR sorted the eighty RODs bought in 1925 which had been given nos. 3020–99 into two batches, which involved considerable renumbering. The worst fifty were "touched up and returned to traffic with steel fireboxes and painted the original R.O.D. black" and renumbered 3050–99; they were run until they failed, when they were withdrawn – after July 1930, only one remained, being withdrawn the following year. The best thirty were "thoroughly overhauled, fitted with copper fireboxes and painted G.W. standard green", they also acquired Swindon fittings, including top feed and brass safety valve casing, and were renumbered 3020–49. Nos. 3000–19 (bought 1919) were also overhauled similarly to the new nos. 3020–49 between 1927 and 1929, but were not further renumbered. The leading dimensions of the GWR 3000 Class were the same as the GCR Class 8K except that the GWR increased the boiler pressure to 185 psi (1,280 kPa) which increased the tractive effort from 31,327 lbf (139,350 N) to 32,197 lbf (143,220 N).

== World War II ==
The GWR borrowed 30 Class O4 from the LNER in November 1940, of which two were returned the following April; ten were returned in July–August 1942 and the rest in January–February 1943. On the GWR, they retained their LNER numbers, which were scattered between 5391 and 6639. Three of these had been hired by the GWR between 1919 and 1922:

Locomotives hired by and subsequently loaned to the GWR
ROD number	First hire	GWR number	Returned to ROD	LNER number	Loaned to GWR	Returned to LNER
1685	December 1919	3075	October 1922	6321	November 1940	January 1943
1608	December 1919	3082	October 1922	6365	November 1940	January 1943
1827	March 1920	3095	October 1922	6258	November 1940	July 1942

== British Railways ==
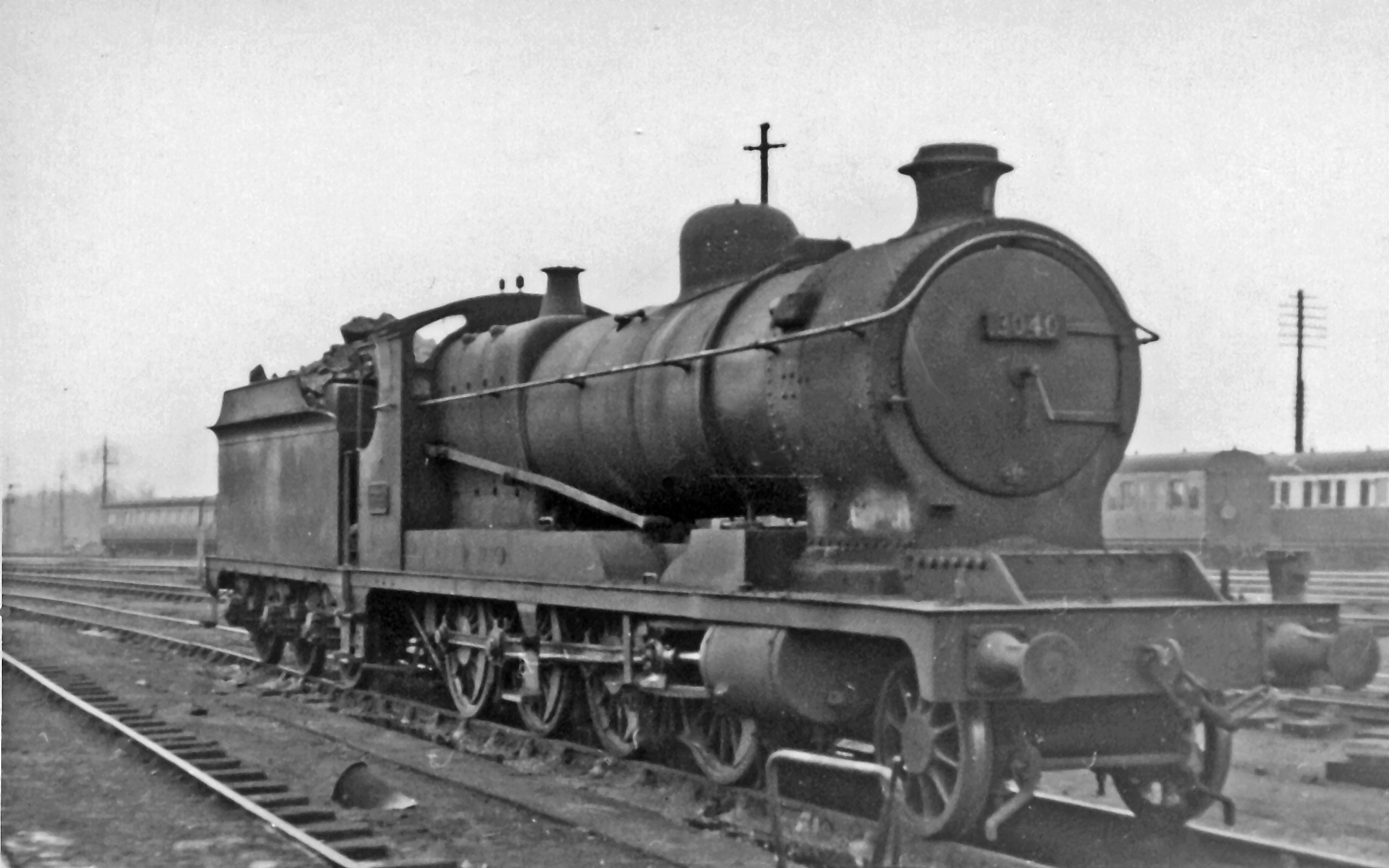
No. 3040 at Oxford Locomotive Depot 22 February 1953

Forty-six of the RODs entered British Railways service in 1948. Five locomotives (numbers 3011, 3015, 3024, 3036 and 3041) were still in service in 1957 and of these, nos. 3036/41 were withdrawn in March 1958, the others in October the same year. None of the GWR RODs has survived to preservation.

== Modelling ==
In November 2011, Bachmann released a OO gauge ready to run model of the 3000 class. This complements kits in various gauges.
