= ROD 2-8-0 =

British locomotives built for World War I

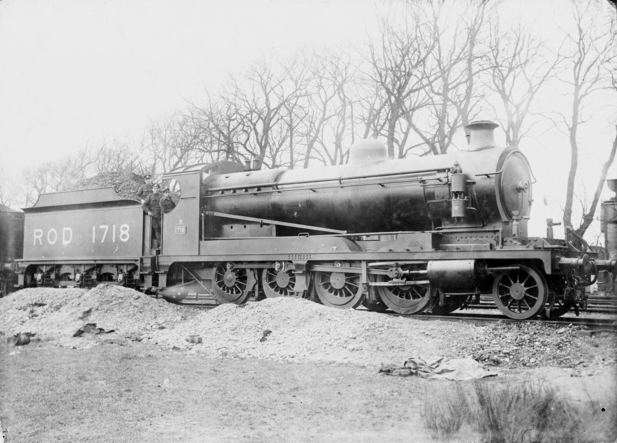
ROD 1718 with Australian Broad Gauge Company soldiers at Couchil-le-temple 22 January 1919.

The Railway Operating Division (ROD) ROD 2-8-0 are a type of 2-8-0 "Consolidation" type steam locomotives which was the standard heavy freight locomotive operated in Europe by the ROD during the First World War.

== ROD need for a standard locomotive ==
During the First World War the Railway Operating Division of the Royal Engineers requisitioned about 600 locomotives of various types from thirteen United Kingdom railway companies; the first arrived in France in late 1916. As the war became prolonged it became clear that the ROD needed its own standard locomotive, so the ROD adopted the Great Central Railway Class 8K 2-8-0 designed by John G. Robinson in 1911.

== Procurement of RODs ==
There were three batches of orders. The first batch of orders were placed between February and June 1917 for 223 locomotives. The second batch of orders was for 100 locomotives, placed between February and August 1918; onwards, followed by an order for 188 more in Autumn 1918 to sustain the UK's locomotive manufacturing industry after the war. The 521 ROD 2-8-0s were built as follows: 369 by the North British Locomotive Company, 82 by Robert Stephenson and Company, 32 by Nasmyth, Wilson and Company, 32 by Kitson and Company and six by the Great Central Railway's Gorton Works.

== RODs in continental Europe ==
Of the initial order for 325 locomotives, 311 were shipped to France for war service. The locomotives were mainly used to haul military supply and troop trains, plus some services for civilians.

After the Armistice of 11 November 1918 many of the class returned from France to the UK in 1919 and 1920. One ROD 2-8-0 duty remaining until the latter year was a through troop train from Cologne to Calais.

== Post-war use in Great Britain ==
After the war British railway companies had a backlog of locomotives that required overhaul and repair: 498 ROD 2-8-0s were loaned to nine railway companies between 1919 and 1921 to cover goods traffic while the backlog was cleared. The ROD 2-8-0s were then placed into storage around the country until they were disposed of.

They were then sold as follows:

Date	Company	Quantity acquired	New class	Notes
1919	Great Central Railway	3	GCR Class 8K	Renumbered 1, 5, and 8
1919	Great Western Railway	20	GWR 3000 Class	Renumbered 3000–3019
1920	London and North Western Railway	30	LNWR Class MM	Renumbered 2400-2430 later to LMS
1923	London and North Eastern Railway	125	LNER Class O4	Renumbered 6253–6377
1925	Great Western Railway	80	GWR 3000 Class	Renumbered 3020–3099
1925	London and North Eastern Railway	48	LNER Class O4	Renumbered 6495–6542
1927	London and North Eastern Railway	100	LNER Class O4	Renumbered 6543–6642
1927	London, Midland and Scottish Railway	75	LMS ex-ROD 2-8-0	acquired mostly for their tenders - 30 resold without tenders for export to China, 25 scrapped, 20 placed in service

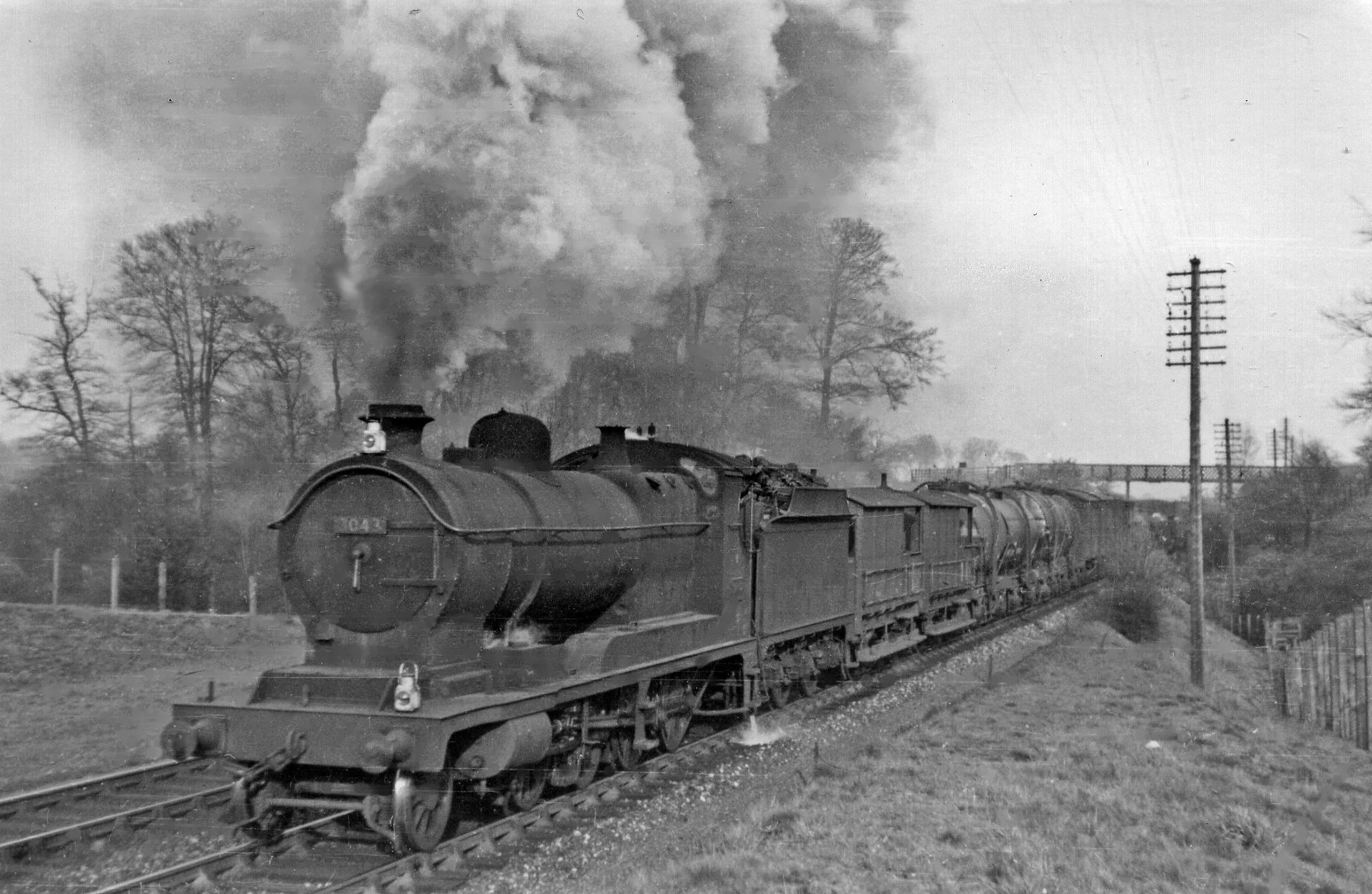
Great Western Railway 3043 at Seer Green 1950

The Great Western Railway bought 20 ROD locos in 1919 and a further 80 in 1925. The locomotives were widely spread over much of the GWR system, being used on heavy freight trains. The first withdrawals were made in 1927, but 45 survived to be taken over by British Railways in 1948 and the last three survivors were not withdrawn until October 1958.

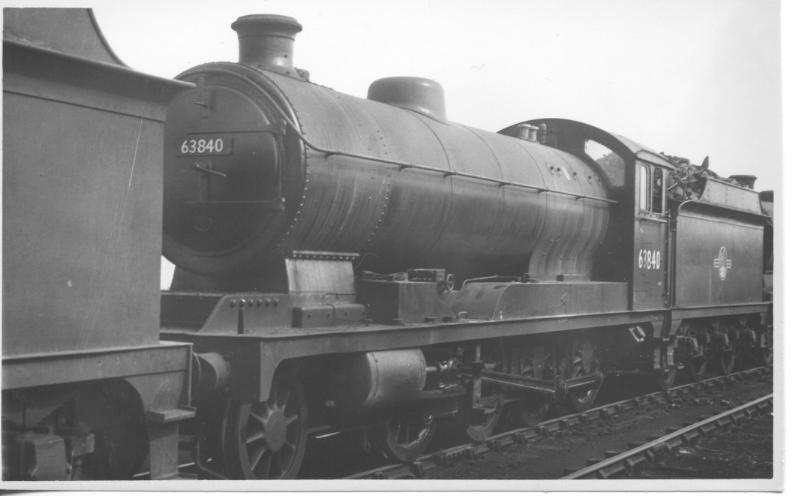
63840 was built as ROD No. 1993 by the North British Locomotive Company in Glasgow in January 1919. On disposal by the ROD in 1925 it became Class O4/2 No. 6524 with the LNER and later no. 63840. Photo at Langwith Junction on 7 August 1960. It was withdrawn by British Railways in September 1963.

The London and North Western Railway bought 30 locos in 1920. In the grouping in 1923 these entered the stock of the London, Midland and Scottish Railway, which bought another 75 of the class in 1927. The ROD's range of operations on the LMS was restricted by its high axle loading. Withdrawals began in 1928 and the last was gone by 1932. Some of the LMS examples were exported to China as China Railway KD4.

The largest purchaser of the RODs was the London and North Eastern Railway which bought 273 between late 1923 and early 1927 to supplement its 130 existing GCR Class 8K locos. The combined fleet served widely throughout the LNER system and many were modified over the years to prolong their useful life. In 1941 the War Department requisitioned 92 locomotives for use overseas (see below). Withdrawal of the first ex-LNER RODs was made by British Railways in 1959 and the last was retired from the Doncaster area in April 1966.

Thirteen RODs were purchased direct from the UK War Department in the 1920s by J & A Brown and shipped to Australia, for use on the privately owned Richmond Vale Railway. The last of the 13 RODs was withdrawn in 1973 and three survive.

== RODs in China ==
In 1927, the LMS purchased 75 ex-Railway Operating Division ROD 2-8-0s from George Cohen and Armstrong Disposals Corporation, primarily for their tenders, which were used for various ex-LNWR locomotives. Thirty engines were sold, minus their tenders, to Armstrong Whitworth, who exported most of them to China as Chinese Government Railways KD4. 25 engines were scrapped by the LMS between 1927 and 1930. The remaining 20 were overhauled and pressed into service as numbers 9646–65 in 1927 and 1928. Initially given power classification of 5, this was later revised to 7F. Several were later renumbered but some were withdrawn before they had a chance to receive their allotted numbers. All were withdrawn between 1929 and 1932 and scrapped.

== RODs in the Middle East ==
During the Second World War the War Department needed heavy freight engines so in September 1941 it requisitioned 92 LNER locos. 61 were RODs bought by the LNER in the mid-1920s and 31 were GCR Class 8K locos. They were shipped to Egypt and Palestine, where they worked on Egyptian State Railways, Palestine Railways, the Haifa, Beirut and Tripoli Railway between Palestine and Lebanon, the Chémin de Fer Damas-Hama et Prolongements in Syria, and Iraqi State Railways. Iraqi State Railways had six examples and designated them class RD: in March 1967 at least one remained in storage at Shalchiyah works outside Baghdad awaiting disposal. In 1952 the UK shipped a final five RODs to the Middle East. Some remained in service in the Suez Canal Zone until 1955, then passed into Egyptian State Railways stock until withdrawal in 1961 and were all scrapped.

== RODs in Australia ==
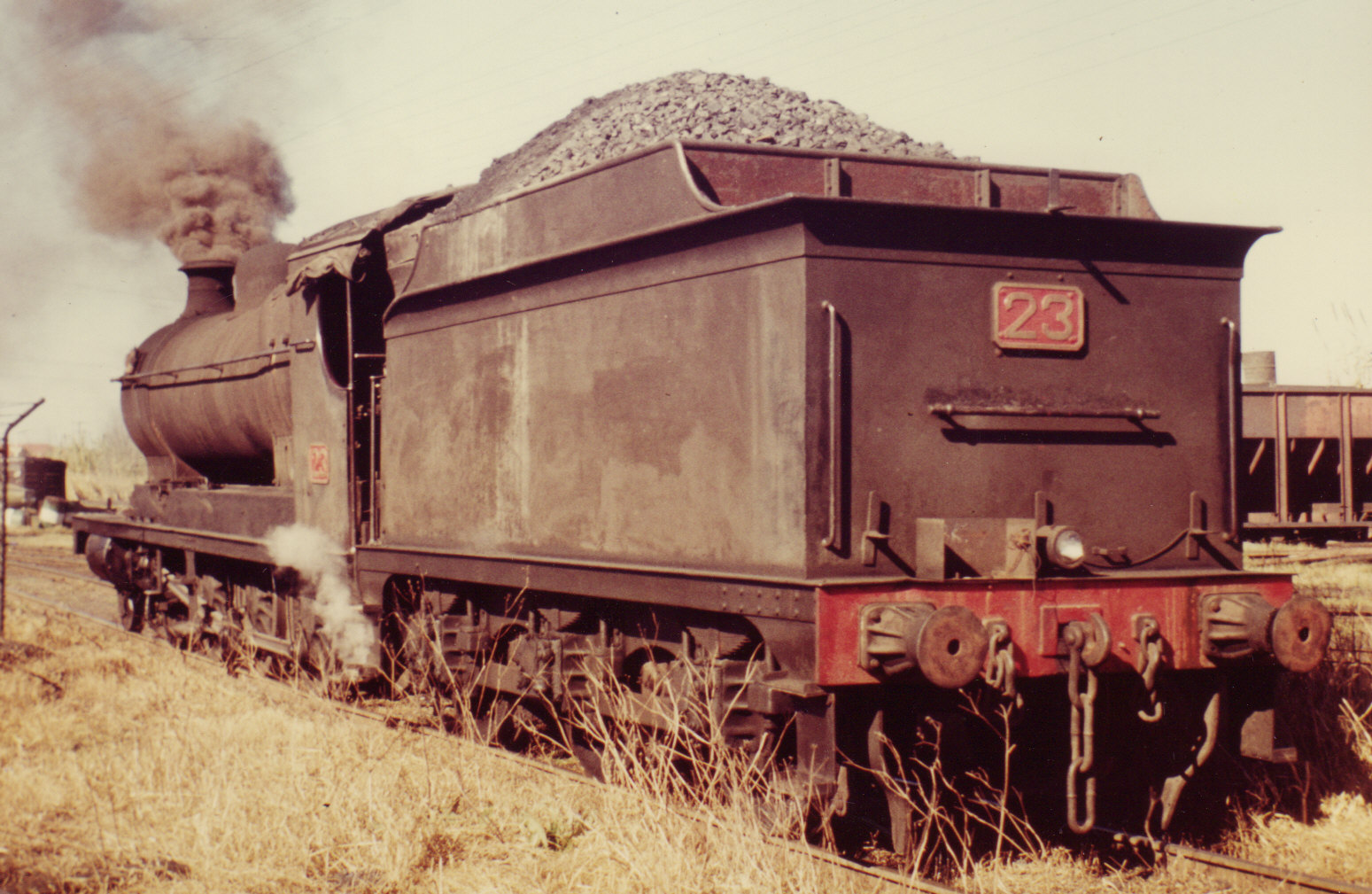
J & A Brown 23 at Hexham in June 1973

J & A Brown, a coal mining company in the Hunter Valley area of New South Wales, Australia, bought thirteen RODs to replace the older locomotives used on their Richmond Vale railway line. Nine (12-20) were built by the North British Locomotive Company, one by Kitson & Company (21) and three by the Great Central Railway (22-24). They were bought between March 1925 and March 1927. The first three arrived complete on the SS Boorara in February 1926 and were unloaded in Sydney and hauled to their home base at Hexham. In late 1927 the rest arrived in crates on Brown's new ship the SS Minmi on its maiden voyage to Hexham. The dismantled locomotives were gradually reassembled with the last not being complete until 1931, but all thirteen locos were never in service at the one time. The maximum number in service at any one time was ten during 1954. The last of class was withdrawn in June 1973.

== Preservation of RODs ==
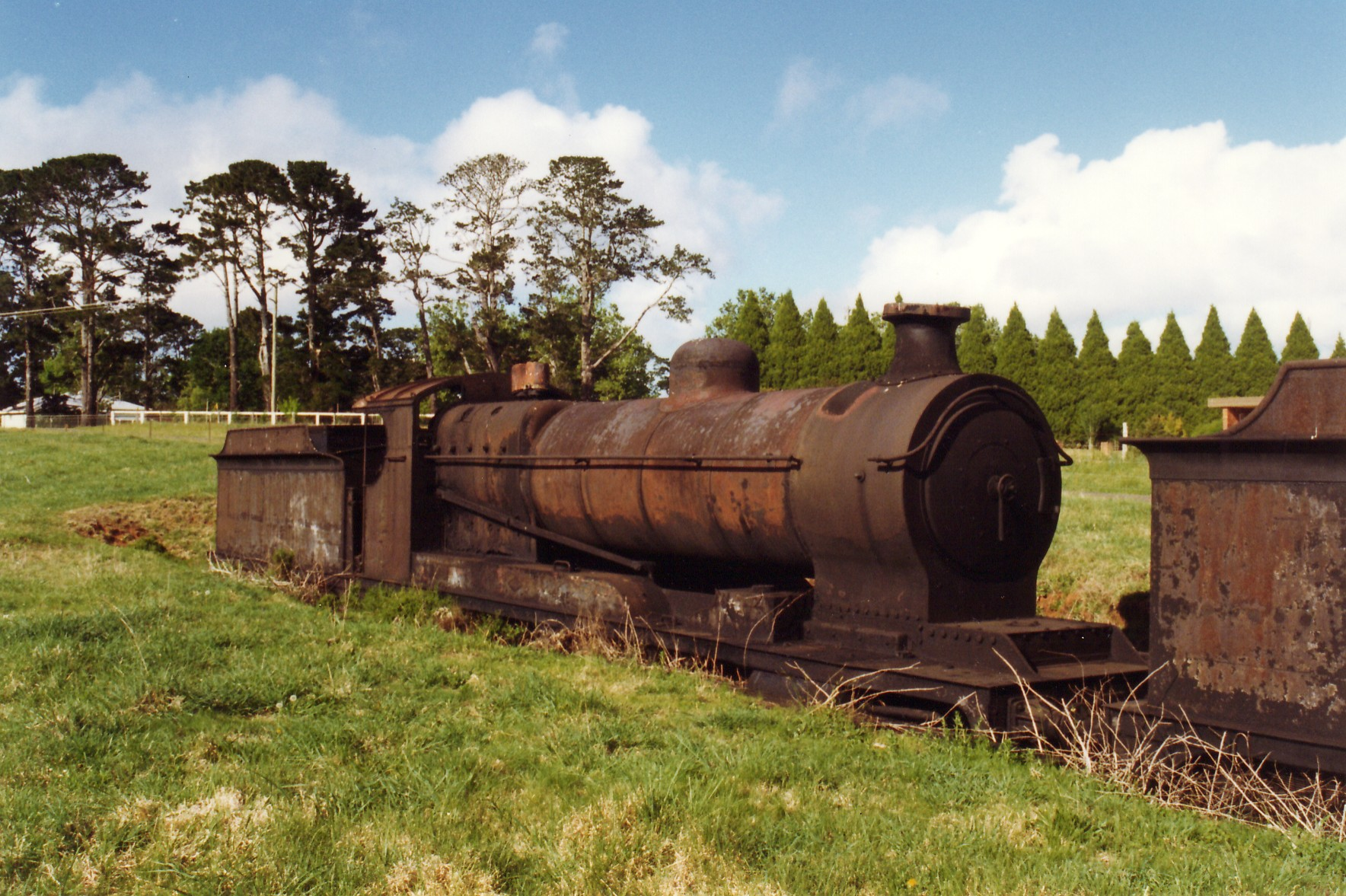
J & A Brown No.20 (ex ROD 1984) preserved at Dorrigo in 1996.

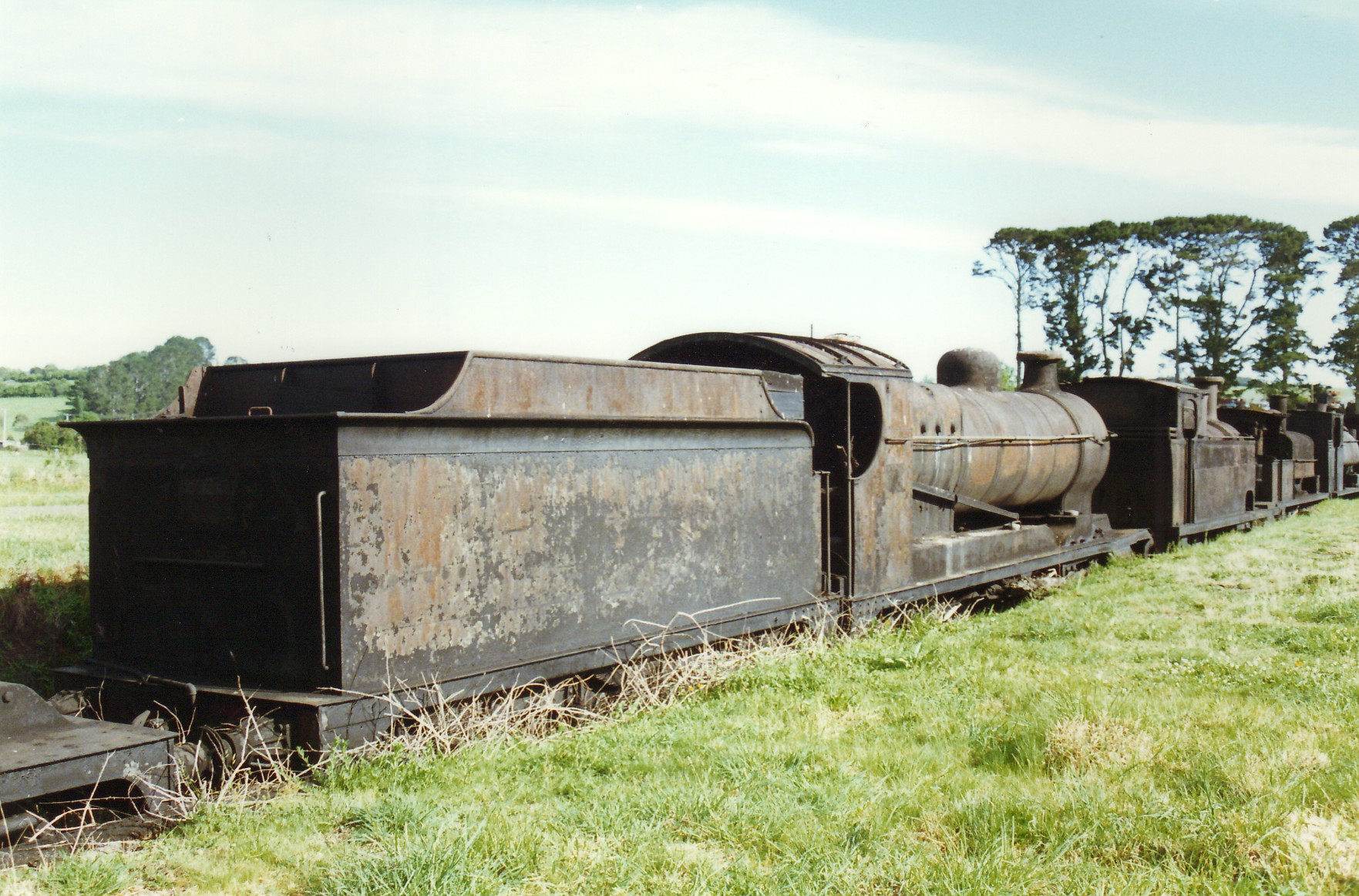
J & A Brown No.24 (ex ROD 2003) preserved at Dorrigo in 1996.

Three ROD 2-8-0s and one pre-war 8K have been preserved:

Australia:

- J&A Brown 20 (Ex-ROD 1984, North British No 22042) by the Dorrigo Steam Railway & Museum
- J&A Brown 23 (Ex-ROD 2004, Gorton) was dismantled to investigate the feasibility of restoration in the mid 1990s. After the extent of works required was deemed too expensive at the time it was stored for nearly 20 years before undergoing a full static rebuild in 2016 and is now on public display at the Richmond Vale Railway Museum.
- J&A Brown 24 (Ex-ROD 2003, Gorton) by the Dorrigo Steam Railway & Museum

Both ROD Locomotives preserved in Dorrigo served with the Allies in France.

UK:

- LNER Class O4 63601, Owned by the National Railway Museum, and currently located at the GCR.
