= Rød =

Rød is the Norwegian and Danish word for the color "red". It is also a shortened version of the Norwegian dialect word røddning (or rødning), meaning a cleared place.

Rød may also refer to:

== People ==
- Rød (surname), a list of many people with this surname

== Places ==
- Rød, Arendal, a village in Arendal municipality in Agder county, Norway
- Rød, Gjerstad, a village in Gjerstad municipality in Agder county, Norway
- Rød, Østfold, a village in Hvaler municipality in Østfold county, Norway

== Other ==
- Rød Valgallianse, a former far-left party in Norway
- Rød pølse, red, boiled pork sausage common in Denmark
- Rød snø, a Norwegian/Swedish thriller television series

== See also ==
- Rod (disambiguation)
