= Rudd (disambiguation) =

Rudd is a common name used for fish of the genus Scardinius.

Rudd may also refer to:

== People ==
- Rudd (surname)
- Ruddell Rudd Weatherwax (1907-1985), American actor and animal trainer

== Other uses ==
- Rudd, Iowa, United States, a city
- Rudd (Greyhawk), a character from the Greyhawk campaign setting for the Dungeons & Dragons roleplaying game
- Rudd Center for Food Policy and Obesity at Yale, a scientific and public policy organization in New Haven, Connecticut
- Rudd Concession, an 1888 mining concession that Charles Rudd secured from Lobengula, King of Matabeleland
- Rudd Field or McGuire Air Force Base in New Jersey

== See also ==
- Rudd's Mouse, an African mouse
- Rodd
