= Rood (disambiguation) =

A rood is a Christian cross or crucifix.

Rood may also refer to:

- Rood (surname)
- ROOD, a Dutch political youth organisation
- Rood (unit), an English unit of length or area
- Rood (Scots), a Scottish unit of area
- "Rood" (song), a 2006 song by Marco Borsato
- Rood Building, a commercial building in Grand Rapids, Michigan
- Rood Candy Company Building, a manufacturing plant in Pueblo, Colorado

== See also ==
- Rod (disambiguation)
