= Hrod =

Hrod may refer to:

- Hroðr, Norse mythology
- Hrod (toponymy), Slavic toponyms
