= Tomáš Rod =

Czech ice hockey forward

- Born: April 26, 1988 (age 36); Písek, Czechoslovakia
- Height: 6 ft 0 in (183 cm)
- Weight: 198 lb (90 kg; 14 st 2 lb)
- Position: Forward
- Shoots: Left
- Czech 2. Liga team Former teams: IHC Písek; BK Mladá Boleslav; Motor České Budějovice; HC Pardubice
- Playing career: 2007–present

Tomáš Rod (born April 26, 1988) is a Czech professional ice hockey forward for IHC Písek of the 2nd Czech Republic Hockey League.

Rod played 50 games in the Czech Extraliga for BK Mladá Boleslav, Motor České Budějovice and HC Pardubice. Having previously played for IHC Písek in 2010 and 2012, he rejoined the team on July 9, 2020.
