= Rød (surname) =

Rød is a Norwegian and Danish word for the color red and a common Norwegian surname. Notable people with the surname include:

- Alf Rød (1894–1969) Norwegian screenwriter, playwright, and film director
- Einar Rød (1897–1931), Norwegian actor
- Harald Rød (1907–1982), Norwegian farmer and politician
- Henrik Rød (born 1975), Norwegian politician
- Ingolf Rød (1889–1963), Norwegian sailor
- Knut Rød (1900–1986), Norwegian police officer
- Ørnulf Rød (1891–1969), Norwegian barrister
- Ragnhild Rød (fl. 1884–1945), Norwegian politician
- Terje Rød-Larsen (born 1947), Norwegian diplomat, politician and sociologist

== See also ==
- Rød (disambiguation)
- Rod (surname)
