= Rodd =

Rodd is a surname and may refer to:

- Brent Clements Rodd (1809–1898), Australian lawyer and landowner
- Edward Hearle Rodd (1810–1880), British ornithologist
- Francis Rodd, 2nd Baron Rennell (1895–1978), British army officer and civil servant
- Helen Rodd (late 20th c./early 21st c.), Canadian zoologist
- Jennifer Rodd (living), British psychologist
- John Rodd (early 21st c.), music recording engineer
- L. C. Rodd (1905–1979), Australian biographer
- Marcia Rodd (1940–2025), American actress
- Michael Rodd (born 1943), English television presenter and businessman
- Nelle Marion Rodd (1887–1915), Australian cartoonist and illustrator
- Rennell Rodd, 1st Baron Rennell (1858–1941), British diplomat, poet and politician
- Tony Rodd (born 1940), Australian botanist

== See also ==
- Rodd, Herefordshire, village in Herefordshire, England
- DeRodd, DeAndre McCullough's brother, on The Corner
- Fort Rodd Hill in Esquimalt, British Columbia, named for John Rashleigh Rodd
- Rodd & Gunn, brand of men's clothing
- Rod (disambiguation)
- Rudd (disambiguation)
