= Railway Operating Division =

British military unit, part of the Royal Engineers

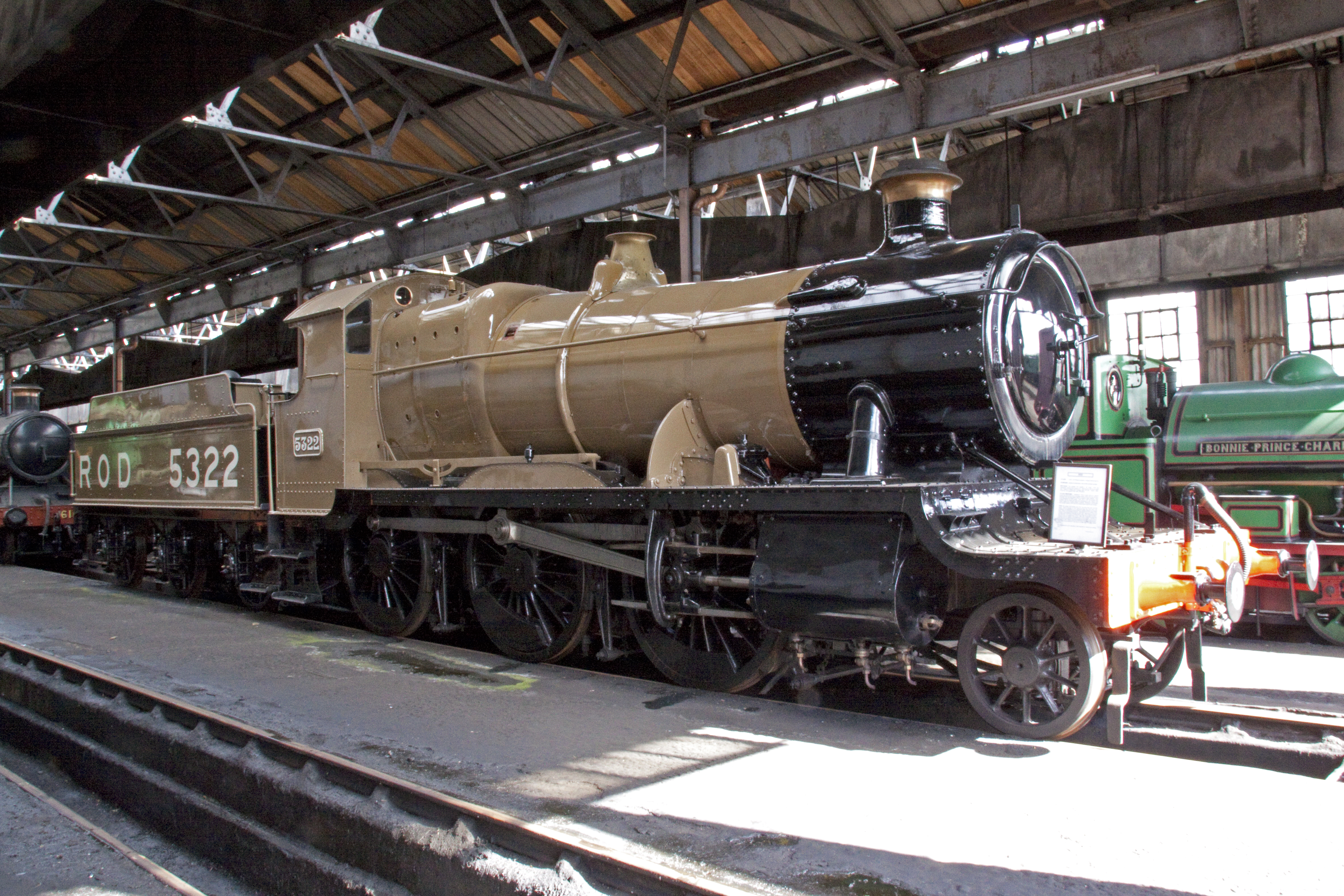
GWR 4300 Class 5322, preserved in ROD khaki livery

The Railway Operating Division (ROD) was a division of the Royal Engineers formed in 1915 to operate railways in the many theatres of the First World War. It was largely composed of railway employees and operated both standard gauge and narrow gauge railways.

The ROD operated their first line on a section of the Hazebrouck–Ypres line. The work was carried out by former employees of the London and North Western Railway.

The ROD requisitioned many diverse locomotives from Britain's railway companies and leased several Belgian locomotives sent to France in 1914, but as the war dragged on adopted the Great Central Railway's Robinson Class 8K 2-8-0 as its standard freight locomotive to become the ROD 2-8-0. Some locomotives were also purchased from Baldwin in the United States.

They also operated narrow-gauge engines (meter gauge or 600 millimetres (2.0 ft) gauge trains).

After the war, requisitioned locomotives returned to their foreign owners.

- the ROD 2-8-0 were stored in Great Britain and sold to several British companies between 1919 and 1927.
- the Baldwin locomotives were sold as military surplus; most of them ended up in Belgium and France.

During the First World War, the Railway Operating Division were assisted in their duties by other army units. The 17th Battalion, Northumberland Fusiliers. The Battalion, a Pals Battalion raised by the North Eastern Railway, began its life as a regular infantry battalion. It later became a Pioneer battalion and, owing to the large number of railwaymen available, became a Railway Pioneer battalion in October 1916 working under General Headquarters (GHQ) Railway Construction Troops. In September 1917, the battalion returned to an infantry battalion but returned to GHQ in November. They finally returned to an infantry battalion in May 1918, where they remained until the end of the war.

== Railway Construction Companies ==
A number of Railway Construction Companies existed during the great war. The companies built standard gauge railways in combat zones on multiple fronts during the war. At the start of the First World War there were two regular and three special reserve, these were:

- 8th Railway Company
- 10th Railway Company
- Depot Company
- Royal Anglesey (1 company)
- Royal Monmouthshire (1 company)

It was soon realised the importance of railways on the front line, several more companies were raised for the duration of the war. The last company was demobilised in 1919.

Great War companies included:

Railway Company	Raised	Embarked	Theatre
2nd (Monmouth)	Longmoor	11 November 1914	Western Front
3rd (Anglesey)	Longmoor	11 November 1914	Western Front
3rd (Monmouth)	Longmoor	11 November 1914	Western Front
8th	Longmoor	15 August 1914	Western Front
10th	Longmoor	28 November 1914	Western Front
109th	Longmoor	24 December 1914	Western Front
110th	Longmoor	15 February 1915	Western Front
111th	Longmoor	15 February 1915	Western Front
112th	Longmoor	15 February 1915	Western Front
113th	Cheltenham	14 April 1915	Western Front
114th	Cheltenham	1 May 1915	Western Front
115th	Longmoor	Unknown	Egypt
116th	Longmoor	Unknown	Egypt
117th	Longmoor	5 September 1915	Salonika
118th	Longmoor	Unknown	Western Front
119th	Longmoor	30 May 1916	Western Front
120th	Longmoor	Unknown	Western Front
200th	Unknown	Unknown	Unknown
259th	Unknown	Unknown	Western Front
260th	Longmoor	3 February 1917	Western Front
261st	Longmoor	26 February 1917	Western Front
262nd	Longmoor	26 February 1917	Western Front
263rd	Longmoor	26 April 1917	Western Front
264th	Longmoor	13 May 1917	Western Front
265th	Longmoor	14 September 1917	Egypt
266th	Longmoor	14 September 1917	Egypt
267th	Unknown	Unknown	Salonika
268th	Longmoor	19 December 1916	Western Front
269th	Longmoor	17 January 1917	Western Front
270th	Cheltenham	Unknown	Egypt
271st	Cheltenham	26 January 1916	Western Front
272nd	Unknown	Unknown	Egypt
273rd	Longmoor	7 September 1916	Salonika
274th	Longmoor	23 October 1916	Egypt
275th	Longmoor	21 August 1916	Western Front
276th	Unknown	Unknown	Egypt
277th	Unknown	Unknown	Western Front
278th	Boulogne	Unknown	Western Front
279th	Unknown	Unknown	Western Front
280th	Cheltenham	Unknown	Western Front
281st	Cheltenham	Unknown	Western Front
282nd	Cheltenham	Unknown	Western Front
295th	Unknown	Unknown	Western Front
296th	Boulogne	Unknown	Western Front
297th	Unknown	Unknown	Western Front
298th	Unknown	Unknown	Western Front
299th	Unknown	Unknown	Western Front

== See also ==
- Locomotives used by the Railway Operating Division
- War Department Light Railways homepage
