= Locomotives of the London and North Eastern Railway =

The London and North Eastern Railway (LNER) produced several classes of locomotive, mostly to the designs of Nigel Gresley, characterised by a three-cylinder layout with a parallel boiler and round-topped firebox. It produced the most famous locomotive of its day, 4468 'Mallard', the holder of the world steam locomotive speed record. It also built the world-famous 4472 'Flying Scotsman'. However, its locomotive inheritance was much greater than just the 'A4 Class', it also produced highly successful mixed-traffic and freight designs.

== Locomotives of constituent companies ==
=== Great Central Railway ===
Including the Manchester, Sheffield and Lincolnshire Railway

==== Charles Sacré (1859–1886) ====
Class	Wheel arrangement	Quantity	Manufacturer	Date	LNER Class	Notes
1B	2-4-0	5		1868	(none)	
4	0-4-0ST	2	Manning Wardle	1883	Y2	Manning Wardle Class H
6B	4-4-0	27		1877–80	D12	
172	0-6-0	1		1861	(none)	acquired from the South Yorkshire Railway
15	2-4-0	4		1865	(none)	Built for the Sardinian Railway
6C	0-6-0	62	Gorton Works	1880–85	J12	
12	2-4-0	10	Gorton Works	1873	(none)	
12A	2-4-0	28		1875–85	(none)	
12AT	2-4-0T	8	Gorton Works	1881	E8	
12AM	2-4-0T	6	Gorton Works	1881	(none)	rebuild from 12AT
7	0-6-0T	6		1885	(none)	
23	0-6-0	50		1861-1867	(none)	
4	0-6-0ST	1	Manning Wardle	1873	J69/1	Acquired 1876
18	0-6-0	68		1869–73	(none)	Twenty rebuilt as tank engine 1902–05
18 Converted	0-6-0ST	20		1869–71	J58	Rebuilt from tender engines 1902–05
18A	0-6-0	7	Gorton Works	1871	(none)	
18T	0-6-0ST	41		1871–81	J59	
14	2-2-2	12		1882-1883	(none)	

==== Thomas Parker (1886–1893) ====
Class	Wheel arrangement	Quantity	Manufacturer	Date	LNER Class	Notes
2	4-4-0	25	Kitson & Co. (13); Gorton Works (12)	1887–1892	D7	
3	2-4-2T	39		1889–1892	F1	
6AI	0-6-0	12		1888	J8	
6D	2-4-0	3	Gorton Works	1887	E2	
6DB	4-4-0	3	Gorton Works	1888	D8	
9	0-6-0	6	Gorton Works	1888–89	J13	
9A	0-6-2T	55		1889–92	N4	
9B & 9E	0-6-0	31	Neilson & Co. (25) ? (6)	1891–95	J9	
9C & 9F	0-6-2T	129		1891–1901	N5	Includes two acquired with Wrexham, Mold and Connah's Quay Railway
9D, 9H & 9M	0-6-0	124		1892–1902	J10	

==== Harry Pollitt (1893–1900) ====
Class	Wheel arrangement	Quantity	Manufacturer	Date	LNER Class	Notes
2A	4-4-0	6	Gorton Works	1887–1892	D7	
5	0-6-0ST	12	Gorton Works	1897	J62	
9G	2-4-2T	10	Beyer, Peacock & Co.	1896	F2	
11	4-4-0	6	Gorton Works	1894–95	D5	
11A	4-4-0	33	Gorton Works (13); Beyer, Peacock & Co. (20)	1897–99	D6	
15	2-6-0	20	Baldwin Locomotive Works	1899	(none)	
13	4-2-2	6		1900	X4	

==== John G. Robinson (1900–22) ====
see John G. Robinson

Class	Wheel arrangement	Quantity	Manufacturer	Date	LNER Class	1946 LNER nos.	Notes
8C	4-6-0	2	Beyer, Peacock & Co.	1903–04	B1	1479–80	later LNER Class B18
1	4-6-0	6	Gorton Works	1912–13	B2	1490–93	"Sir Sam Fay" class; later LNER Class B19
9P	4-6-0	6	Gorton Works	1917–20	B3	1494–99	"Lord Faringdon" class
8F	4-6-0	10	Beyer, Peacock & Co.	1906	B4	1481–89	"Immingham" class
8	4-6-0	14	Neilson & Co. (6); Beyer, Peacock & Co. (8)	1902–04	B5	1678–90	"Fish Engines"
8N	4-6-0	3	Gorton Works	1918–21	B6	1346–48	
9Q	4-6-0	38	Gorton Works (23); Vulcan Foundry (10); Beyer, Peacock & Co. (5)	1921–23	B7	1360–97	Known as both the "Black Pigs" and the "Colliers' Friends"
1A	4-6-0	11	Gorton Works	1913–15	B8	1349–59	"Glenalmond" class
8G	4-6-0	10	Beyer, Peacock & Co.	1906	B9	1469–78	
8B/8J	4-4-2	27	Beyer, Peacock & Co. (7); North British Loco. Co. (12); Gorton Works (8)	1903–06	C4	2900–25	
8D/8E	4-4-2	4	Gorton Works	1905–06	C5	2895–98	Three-cylinder compounds
11B/11C/11D	4-4-0	40	Sharp, Stewart & Co. (30); Vulcan Foundry (10)	1901–04	D9	2300–33	
11E	4-4-0	10	Gorton Works	1913	D10	2650–59	"Director" class
11F	4-4-0	35	Armstrong Whitworth (12); Gorton Works (11); Kitson & Co. (12)	1919–24	D11	2660–94	"Improved Director" class
9J	0-6-0	174	Neilson, Reid & Co. (49); Beyer, Peacock & Co. (25); Gorton Works (70); Vulcan Foundry (15); Yorkshire Engine Co. (15)	1901–10	J11	4280–4453	
8K	2-8-0	126	Gorton Works (56); Kitson & Co. (20); North British Loco. Co. (50)	1911–14	O4	3570–3900	Another 521 built for the government, of which 276 later came to the LNER. 58 converted to “O1” between 1944 and 1949
8M	2-8-0	19	Gorton Works	1918–21	O5	3902–3920	All eventually converted to "O4"
8A	0-8-0	89	Gorton Works (35); Kitson & Co. (51); Neilson, Reid & Co. (3)	1902–11	Q4	3200–43, 9925–37	13 converted to tanks by LNER (class Q1) 1942–45
9N	4-6-2T	21	Gorton Works	1911–17	A5	9800–20	24 more built by LNER 1923–26
9K	4-4-2T	40	Gorton Works (28); Vulcan Foundry (12)	1903–05	C13	7400–39	
9L	4-4-2T	12	Beyer, Peacock & Co.	1907	C14	7440–51	
4	0-6-0ST	1	Hudswell Clarke	1909	J69/1	—	Acquired 1911
5A	0-6-0T	7	Gorton Works	1906–14	J63	8204–10	
1B	2-6-4T	20	Gorton Works	1914–17	L1	9050–69	LNER class L3 from 1945; first standard gauge locomotive of its wheel arrangement in Britain
8H	0-8-4T	4	Beyer, Peacock & Co.	1907–08	S1	9900–05	Two more built by LNER in 1932

There were also 3 steam rail cars built in 1904–1905. These were withdrawn in 1914.

Alongside this, there was a singular petrol-electric railcar constructed by British Westinghouse and the United Electric Car Company of Preston in 1912, unnumbered. It would survive into grouping, being numbered "51907" under LNER. It was withdrawn in 1935.

==== Lancashire, Derbyshire and East Coast Railway ====
The Lancashire, Derbyshire and East Coast Railway was absorbed by the Great Central Railway on 1 January 1907. All LD&ECR locomotives were built by Kitson & Co.

Class	Wheel arrangement	Quantity	Date	LNER Class	Notes
A	0-6-2T	18	1895–1900	N6	LDEC Nos. 1–8, 19–28. Five more that had been ordered were sold by Kitson's to the Hull and Barnsley Railway
B	0-6-0T	4	1897	J60	LDEC Nos. 9–12
C	0-4-4T	6	1897–1898	G3	LDEC Nos. 13–18
D	0-6-4T	9	1904–06	M1	LDEC Nos. 29–34, A1–A3; GCR 1148–1153, 1145–47

=== Great North of Scotland Railway ===
In 1923 the Great North of Scotland Railway passed on a total of 122 locomotives, 100 4-4-0 tender locomotives and 22 tank engines, all capable of being used on either passenger or goods trains, to the LNER.

Locomotive superintendent	GNoSR Class	LNER class	Quantity Built	Passed to LNER	Wheel arrangement	Manufacturer	Date introduced	Date withdrawn	Notes
William Cowan (1857–83)	K	D47/2	6	3	4-4-0	Neilson & Co.	1866	1921–25	
William Cowan (1857–83)	L	D47/1	6	6	4-4-0	Neilson & Co.	1876	1924–26	
William Cowan (1857–83)	M	D45	9	9	4-4-0	Neilson & Co.	1878	1925–32	
William Cowan (1857–83)	C	D39	3	3	4-4-0	Neilson & Co.	1879	1925–27	
James Manson (1883–90)	A	D44	6	6	4-4-0	Kitson & Co.	1884	1924–32	
James Manson (1883–90)	G	D48	3	3	4-4-0	Kitson & Co.	1885	1928–34	
James Manson (1883–90)	D	J90	6	6	0-6-0T	Kitson & Co.	1884	1932–36	
James Manson (1883–90)	E	J91	3	3	0-6-0T	Kitson & Co.	1885	1931–34	
James Manson (1883–90)	N	D46	2	2	4-4-0	GNSR Kittybrewster	1887	1932–36	
James Manson (1883–90)	O	D42	9	9	4-4-0	Kitson & Co.	1888	1935–46	
James Manson (1883–90)	P	D43	3	3	4-4-0	R. Stephenson & Co.	1890	1936–38	
James Manson (1883–90)	Q	D38	3	3	4-4-0	R. Stephenson & Co.	1890	1931–38	
James Johnson (1890–94)	R	G10	9	9	0-4-4T	Neilson & Co.	1893	1937–47	
James Johnson (1890–94)	S	D41	6	6	4-4-0	Neilson & Co.	1893	1947–	
William Pickersgill (1894–1914)	T	D41	26	26	4-4-0	Neilson & Co.	1895–98	1946–	
William Pickersgill (1894–1914)	V	D40	5	13	4-4-0	Neilson & Co.	1899–1900	1946–	Ten were ordered, five sold to the SE&CR
William Pickersgill (1894–1914)	V	D40	8	13	4-4-0	GNSR Inverurie	1910–15	1947–	
Thomas E. Heywood (1914–23)	Y	Z5	2	2	0-4-2T	Manning Wardle	1915		
Thomas E. Heywood (1914–23)	X	Z5, later Z4	2	2	0-4-2T	Manning Wardle	1915		
Thomas E. Heywood (1914–23)	F	D40	6	8	4-4-0	North British Loco. Co.	1920		Named
Thomas E. Heywood (1914–23)	F	D40	2	8	4-4-0	GNSR Inverurie	1921		Named

=== Hull and Barnsley Railway ===
From its formal establishment in 1885 to the time that it was taken over by the North Eastern Railway (NER) in 1922, the CME of the H&BR was Matthew Stirling, who, like his father and uncle, built locomotives with domeless boilers.

Class	Wheel arrangement	Quantity	Manufacturer	Date	LNER Class	Notes
A	0-6-0T	12	Beyer, Peacock & Co.	1884	—	
B	0-6-0	20	Beyer, Peacock & Co.	1884	—	
C	2-4-0	10	Beyer, Peacock & Co.	1885	—	
K	0-4-0WT	6	Kitson & Co.	1886–89	—	
B	0-6-0	55	Kitson & Co. (36); Vulcan Foundry (4); Yorkshire Engine Co. (15)	1889–1908	J23	
G2	0-6-0T	3	R. Stephenson & Co.	1892	J80	
F1	0-6-2T	5	Kitson & Co.	1900	N11	Ordered by the Lancashire, Derbyshire and East Coast Railway
F2	0-6-2T	9	Kitson & Co.	1901	N12	
G3	0-6-0T	16	Yorkshire Engine Co. (6); Kitson & Co. (10)	1901–08	J75	
A	0-8-0	15	Yorkshire Engine Co.	1907	Q10	
J	4-4-0	5	Kitson & Co.	1910	D24	
L1	0-6-0	10	Kitson & Co.	1911–12	J28	
L	0-6-0	5	Yorkshire Engine Co.	1914	J28	
LS	0-6-0	5	Kitson & Co.	1915	J28	
F3	0-6-2T	10	Hawthorn Leslie	1913–14	N13	

=== Metropolitan Railway ===
Three classes (the G, H and K Classes) were taken into LNER stock on 1 November 1937. The other former Metropolitan locomotives were retained by London Transport, which had acquired all of them at its formation on 1 July 1933.

Class	Wheel arrangement	Quantity	Manufacturer	Date	LNER Class	Notes
A	4-4-0T	40	Beyer, Peacock & Co.	1864–70	—	
B	4-4-0T	20	Beyer, Peacock & Co.	1879–85	—	
C	0-4-4T	4	Neilson & Co.	1891	—	
D	2-4-0T	6	Sharp, Stewart & Co.	1915	—	
E	0-4-4T	7	Hawthorne Leslie (4), Neasden Works (3)	1896–1901	—	
F	0-6-2T	4	Yorkshire Engine Co.	1915	—	
G	0-6-4T	4	Yorkshire Engine Co.	1915	M2	
H	4-4-4T	8	Kerr, Stuart & Co.	1920–21	H2	
K	2-6-4T	6	Armstrong Whitworth	1925	L2	Similar to the SECR K Class; designed by R.E.L. Maunsell

=== Midland and Great Northern Joint Railway ===
M&GN locomotives were taken into LNER stock on 1 October 1936.

Class	Wheel arrangement	Quantity	Manufacturer	Date	LNER Class	Notes
M&GN Class A	4-4-2T	3	Melton Constable Works	1904–1910	C17	M&GN Nos. 41, 20, 9
M&GN Class C	4-4-0	40	Sharp, Stewart & Co. (33); Beyer, Peacock & Co. (7)	1894–1899	D52/D53/D54	LNER class based on firebox variations
M&GN Class D	0-6-0	16	Neilson & Co. (8); Kitson & Co. (8)	1896-1899	J40/J41	J41 was a rebuilt D Class while J40 was not rebuilt
M&GN Shunting Class	0-6-0T	9	Melton Constable Works	1897–1905	J93	

== Locomotives built by the LNER ==
=== Gresley designs ===
Class	Wheel arrangement	Quantity	Manufacturer	Date	Post-1946 numbers	Notes
A1	4-6-2	50	Doncaster Works; North British Loco. Co.	1922–25	44–83, 103–112	Rebuilt as A3s in 1927–28 and 1939–48
A3	4-6-2	27	Doncaster Works	1928–35	35–43, 84–101	Also 51 rebuilt from A1 in 1927–28 and 1939–48
A4	4-6-2	35	Doncaster Works	1935–38	1–34	Streamlined
B17	4-6-0	73	North British Loco. Co. (10); Darlington Works (52); R. Stephenson & Co. (11)	1928–37	1600–1672	Two were streamlined in "A4" style
D49	4-4-0	76	Darlington Works	1927–35	2700–2775	Named after counties & hunts.
J38	0-6-0	35	Darlington Works	1926	5900–5934	
J39	0-6-0	289	Darlington Works (261); Beyer, Peacock & Co. (28)	1926–41	4700–4988	
K4	2-6-0	6	Darlington Works	1937–39	1993–1998	One later rebuilt by Thompson as K1
P1	2-8-2	2	Doncaster Works	1925	—	
P2	2-8-2	6	Doncaster Works	1934–36	501–506	later streamlined – all rebuilt as A2/2 during 1943–44
U1	2-8-0+0-8-2	1	Beyer, Peacock & Co.	1925	9999	Garratt – for banking on Worsborough incline
V1	2-6-2T	82	Doncaster Works	1930–39	7600–7681	63 later rebuilt as V3
V2	2-6-2	184	Doncaster Works; Darlington Works	1936–44	800–983	Three-cylinder; four rebuilt as A2/2 4-6-2's
V3	2-6-2T	10	Doncaster Works	1939-40	7682–7691	+63 rebuilds of V1 – higher pressure development of V1
V4	2-6-2	2	Doncaster Works	1941	1700–1701	Three-cylinder
W1	4-6-4	1	Darlington Works	1929	10000	experimental high pressure locomotive, later rebuilt in "A4" style.

=== Thompson designs ===
Image	Class	Wheel arrangement	Quantity	Manufacturer	Date	Post 1946 numbers	Notes
	A1/1	4-6-2	1	Doncaster Works	1945	113	Rebuild of LNER Gresley Class A1 Great Northern
	A2/2	4-6-2	6	Doncaster Works	1943-44	501–506	Rebuilds of Gresley P2 2-8-2
	A2/1	4-6-2	4	Darlington Works	1944	507–510	Derived from Gresley V2 2-6-2 design.
	A2/3	4-6-2	15	Doncaster Works	1946–47	500, 511–524	
	B1	4-6-0	274	Darlington Works; North British Loco. Co. Vulcan Foundry	1942–52	1000–1273	Another 136 (Nos.61274–61409) built by BR
	B2	4-6-0	9	Doncaster Works	1945–49		Rebuilds of Gresley Class B17
	K1	2-6-0	1	Darlington Works	1945	1997	Rebuild of Gresley Class K4 Mogul
	K5	2-6-0	1	Doncaster Works	1945	1841	Rebuild of Gresley Class K3 Mogul
	O1	2-8-0	58	Gorton Works	1944		Rebuilds of Robinson Class O4
	L1	2-6-4T	1	Darlington Works	1945	7701	Another 99 built by BR 1949–50
	Q1	0-8-0T	13	Gorton Works	1942–45	9925–9937	Rebuilds of Robinson Class Q4 Tender Engines

=== Peppercorn designs ===
Class	Wheel arrangement	Quantity	Manufacturer	Date	Number	Notes
A2	4-6-2	1	Doncaster Works	1947	525	14 more built by BR 1948

Another A1, "Tornado" has been built by subscription among LNER (and other) locomotive enthusiasts, and came into service in 2008. In total it cost £3 million. Again under the chairmanship of Mark Allatt, the team is (2014) now raising funds most successfully to build another Gresley P2 2-8-2 of the "Cock O'the North" Class, to be called "Prince of Wales". Both new steam locomotives are the product of a restored railway works in Darlington.

=== Other designs ===
- LNER Class A1 – continuation of a GNR design. Several built under the GNR entered service under the LNER.
- LNER Class A2 – based on an NER design simply designated as 4.6.2
- LNER Class A5 – Continuation of a GCR design
- LNER Class A8 – rebuilt from H1 between 1931 and 1936
- LNER Class B12/3 – based on an existing GER design
- LNER Class B16 – continuation of an NER design
- LNER Class C9 – C7 rebuild
- LNER Class D16 – based on an existing GER design. Built by the GER but delivered after grouping.
- LNER Class J27 – continuation of an NER design
- LNER Class J45/DES1 English Electric diesel electric shunting locomotive
- LNER Class DES2 Brush diesel electric shunting locomotive
- LNER Class J50 – continuation of a GNR design. Thirty were rebuilds of Class J51.
- LNER Class J72 – NER Class E1
- LNER Class J94 – WD Austerity 0-6-0ST
- LNER Class N2 – continuation of a GNR design
- LNER Class N7 – continuation of a GER design
- LNER Class N15 – continuation of an NBR design
- LNER Class O2 - continuation of a GNR design.
- LNER Class O6 – LMS Stanier Class 8F – 60 loaned to the LNER 1943–47; 68 purchased 1945–46, sold to LMS 1947
- LNER Class O7 – WD Austerity 2-8-0 – 350 loaned to the LNER 1943–47; 200 purchased 1946; 270 loaned to the LNER 1947
- USATC S160 Class – 168 loaned to the LNER 1942–1945
- WD Austerity 2-10-0 – 13 loaned to the LNER 1943–44; 20 loaned 1945–46
- LNER Class S1 – Continuation of a GCR design
- LNER Class T1 – NER Class X
- LNER Class Y1 – Sentinel shunter
- LNER Class Y3 – Sentinel shunter
- LNER Class Y7 – NER Class H
- LNER Class Y10 – Sentinel shunter
- LNER Class Y11 – Simplex 0-4-0 petrol locomotive (later British Rail 15097–15099)

== Post-Nationalisation ==
British Railways continued to build LNER designs (the B1 and L1 classes in particular) immediately after Nationalisation. Remarkably, it even built a new series of shunting locomotives (J72 class) to a pre-Grouping design (of the North Eastern Railway). However, it was to be the Eastern Region that took the first of BR's new Standard locomotives, 70000 'Britannia', for its Great Eastern Main Line workings to Norwich in 1951.

BR built 396 locomotives to ex-LNER designs. One of these, the J72 Class was a North Eastern Railway design dating from 1898.

Class	Wheel arrangement	Quantity	Manufacturer	Date	Numbers	Notes
Peppercorn A1	4-6-2	49	Doncaster Works (26); Darlington Works (23)	1948-49	60114–162	
Peppercorn A2	4-6-2	14	Doncaster Works	1948	60526–539	
Thompson B1	4-6-0	136	North British Loco. Co.(106); Gorton Works (10); Darlington Works (20)	1948–52	61273–409	
J72	0-6-0T	28	Darlington Works	1949–51	69001–28	NER Class E1
Thompson/Peppercorn K1	2-6-0	70	North British Loco. Co.	1949–50	62001–70	
Thompson L1	2-6-4T	99	Darlington Works (29); North British Loco. Co. (35); R. Stephenson & Hawthorns (35)	1948–50	67702–800	

== Withdrawal ==
Withdrawal of ex-LNER locomotives took place throughout the 1960s, with some of the once high-profile 'A4 Class' locomotives ending their lives on heavy freight trains in Scotland; a far cry from the glamorous express workings of the late 1930s.

== Preservation ==
Several of the many LNER locomotives have been preserved. (Numbers given are those currently carried: many locomotives have carried a range of numbers during their active and preserved careers).

Class	Wheel arrangement	Number	Name	Home Base	Status
A4 Pacific	4-6-2	4464	Bittern	Crewe LNWR	Operational; under overhaul
A4 Pacific	4-6-2	4468	Mallard	National Railway Museum	Static exhibit
A4 Pacific	4-6-2	60009	Union of South Africa	Thornton Yard	Static exhibit
A4 Pacific	4-6-2	4489	Dominion of Canada	Canadian Railway Museum	Static exhibit
A4 Pacific	4-6-2	60008	Dwight D Eisenhower	National Railroad Museum, Green Bay, Wisconsin	Static exhibit
A4 Pacific	4-6-2	4498	Sir Nigel Gresley	North Yorkshire Moors Railway	Operational
A3 Pacific	4-6-2	60103	Flying Scotsman	National Railway Museum	Operational
A2 Peppercorn	4-6-2	60532	Blue Peter	Crewe LNWR	Operational
B1 Thompson	4-6-0	61264		North Yorkshire Moors Railway	Operational
B1 Thompson	4-6-0	1306	Mayflower	North Norfolk Railway	Operational
D49 Class	4-4-0	246	Morayshire	Bo'ness and Kinneil Railway	Operational
K4 Class	2-6-0	61994	The Great Marquess	Thornton Yard	Cracked firebox discovered at visit to NYMR; currently awaiting repair
K1 Thompson/Peppercorn	2-6-0	62005	Lord of the Isles†	North Yorkshire Moors Railway	Operational
V2 Class	2-6-2	4771	Green Arrow	National Railway Museum	Static Exhibit
Y1 "Sentinel" Class	0-4-0VBT	68153		Middleton Railway	Awaiting restoration to working order
D17/1 Class	4-4-0	1621		National Railway Museum	Static Exhibit
J27 Class	0-6-0	65894		North Yorkshire Moors Railway	Operational; awaiting overhaul
J21 Class	0-6-0	65033		National Railway Museum	Static Exhibit: awaiting outcome of funding bid for restoration to steam.
Q6 Class	0-8-0	63395		North Yorkshire Moors Railway	Operational; under overhaul
E6 Class	2-4-0	910		National Railway Museum	Static Exhibit
E5 Class	2-4-0	1463		Head of Steam, Darlington	Static Exhibit
X1 Class (experimental)	2-2-4T	66	Aerolite	National Railway Museum	Static Exhibit
Y7 Class	0-4-0T	1310		Middleton Railway	Operational
Y7 Class	0-4-0T	985		Mid-Suffolk Light Railway	Operational; under overhaul
J72 Class	0-6-0T	69023	Joem†	Wensleydale Railway	Operational
Q7 Class	0-8-0	901		Head of Steam, Darlington	Static Exhibit
C1 Class	4-4-2	251		National Railway Museum, York	Static Exhibit
C2 "Klondyke" Class	4-4-2	990	Henry Oakley	National Railway Museum	Static Exhibit
N2 Class	0-6-2T	4744		Great Central Railway	Operational
J52 Class	0-6-0ST	1247		National Railway Museum	Static Exhibit
D26 Class	4-4-0	256	Glen Douglas	Riverside Museum, Glasgow	Static Exhibit
J36 Class	0-6-0	673	Maude	Bo'ness and Kinneil Railway	Operational; under overhaul
Y9 Class	0-4-0ST	42		Scottish Railway Preservation Society Museum	Static Exhibit
D40 Class	4-4-0	49	Gordon Highlander	Bo'ness and Kinneil Railway	Static Exhibit
O4 Class	2-8-0	63601		Great Central Railway	Operational; under overhaul
D11 Class	4-4-0	506	Butler-Henderson	National Railway Museum	Static Exhibit
B12/3 Class	4-6-0	8572		North Norfolk Railway	Operational
E4 Class	2-4-0	490		Bressingham Steam Museum	Static Exhibit
J15 Class	0-6-0	564		North Norfolk Railway	Operational
J17 Class	0-6-0	1217		National Railway Museum	Static Exhibit
J69 Class	0-6-0T	87		National Railway Museum	Static Exhibit
N7 Class	0-6-2T	1899		National Railway Museum	Static Exhibit
Y5 Class	0-4-0ST	229		The Flour Mill Locomotive Repair Workshop	Operational. Withdrawn in 1921, so it never carried an official LNER number.

† denotes name given only in preservation.

== See also ==
- List of LNER locomotives as of 31 December 1947
