= Locomotives of the Hull and Barnsley Railway =

The Hull and Barnsley Railway never manufactured any of its own locomotives, all being built elsewhere. The first types in use were of the design W. Kirtley (Locomotive Superintendent of the London, Chatham and Dover Railway) who was acting as a consultant. Matthew Stirling (son of Patrick Stirling of 'Stirling Single' fame) was the first and only Locomotive Superintendent of the H&BR during its independence, and he undertook the rebuilding of some of Mr. Kirtley's designs, as well as contracting the construction of his own designs to various builders. His locomotives were typically domeless, and many of the original Kirtley engines were also rebuilt without domes.

Kirtley's locomotives were painted black with grey lining. Matthew Stirling subtly modified the livery – using invisible green (black except in bright sunlight) produced from a 50:50 mixture of 'drop black' and 'brunswick green'. Lining was of broad stripes of blue (ultramarine) with red (vermilion) edges. The 2-4-0 and 0-6-0 tender locomotives procured by Kitley carried a small cursive monogram of the letters "HB&WRJR", other locomotives carried the initials "H&BR".

Locomotives of the Hull and Barnsley Railway
Year built	Class	Original numbers	Type	Designer	Builder	Notes	LNER Class
1884–5	A (later G1)	1 to 12	0-6-0 tank	W. Kirtley	Beyer Peacock and Co. Ltd.	For shunting – Wheelbase too long for Alexandra Dock	
1885	B (later D), E	13 to 32	0-6-0 tender	W. Kirtley	Beyer Peacock and Co. Ltd.	For freight use, rebuilt 1897	
1885	C (later H, H1)	33–42	2-4-0 tender	W. Kirtley	Beyer Peacock and Co. Ltd.	For passenger use, same tender as above, 5 rebuilt 1899–1900, 5 remainder rebuilt 1901–1903 to different specifications	
1886		43–48	0-4-0 tank	Kitson and Co. (Leeds)		Acquired for shunting in Alexandra Dock to replace G1	
1889	B	49–56	0-6-0 tender	M. Stirling	Kitson and Co.	For goods use Later builds had larger boilers and increased boiler pressure, earlier engines rebuilt to the later standard.	J23
1892	B	57–62	0-6-0 tender	M. Stirling	Kitson and Co.	For goods use Later builds had larger boilers and increased boiler pressure, earlier engines rebuilt to the later standard.	J23
1892	B	63–66	0-6-0 tender	M. Stirling	Vulcan Foundry	For goods use Later builds had larger boilers and increased boiler pressure, earlier engines rebuilt to the later standard.	J23
1897–8	B	70–78	0-6-0 tender	M. Stirling	Yorkshire Engine Company	For goods use Later builds had larger boilers and increased boiler pressure, earlier engines rebuilt to the later standard.	J23
1898	B	79–84	0-6-0 tender	M. Stirling	Kitson and Co.	For goods use Later builds had larger boilers and increased boiler pressure, earlier engines rebuilt to the later standard.	J23
1900	B	85–90	0-6-0 tender	M. Stirling	Kitson and Co.	For goods use Later builds had larger boilers and increased boiler pressure, earlier engines rebuilt to the later standard.	J23
1900	B	91–96	0-6-0 tender	M. Stirling	Yorkshire Engine Company	For goods use Later builds had larger boilers and increased boiler pressure, earlier engines rebuilt to the later standard.	J23
1908	B	132–141	0-6-0 tender	M. Stirling	Kitson and Co.	For goods use Later builds had larger boilers and increased boiler pressure, earlier engines rebuilt to the later standard.	J23
1892	G2	67–69	0-6-0 tank	M. Stirling	Robert Stephenson & Co.	Similar to B class tender engines but with slightly smaller boiler, and lower coal and water capacity	J80
1900	F1	97–101	0-6-2 tank	Kitson and Co.		Built for the Lancashire, Derbyshire and East Coast Railway	N11
1901	F2	102–110	0-6-2 tank	M. Stirling	Kitson and Co.		N12
1901	G3	111–116	0-6-0 tank	M. Stirling	Yorkshire Engine Company	Similar to class F2	J75
1908	G3	142–151	0-6-0 tank	M. Stirling	Kitson and Co.		J75
1907	A	117–131	0-8-0 tender	M. Stirling	Yorkshire Engine Co.	For heavy goods	Q10
1910	J	33, 35, 38, 41, 42	4-4-0 tender	M. Stirling	Kitson and Co.	For Sheffield to Hull trains via the Midland Railway	D24
1913	F3	152–156, 13, 15, 18, 23, 27	0-6-2 tank	M. Stirling	R & W Hawthorn, Leslie & Co.		N13
1911	L1	16, 17, 19, 24, 31	0-6-0	M. Stirling	Kitson and Co.	goods engines Class LS (and some L1) used superheated steam, the only type of H&BR locomotive using superheating	J28
1912	L1	14, 25, 29, 30, 32	0-6-0	M. Stirling	Kitson and Co.	goods engines Class LS (and some L1) used superheated steam, the only type of H&BR locomotive using superheating	J28
1915	L	157–161	0-6-0	M. Stirling	Yorkshire Engine Company	goods engines Class LS (and some L1) used superheated steam, the only type of H&BR locomotive using superheating	J28
1915	LS	20-22, 26, 28	0-6-0	M. Stirling	Kitson and Co.	goods engines Class LS (and some L1) used superheated steam, the only type of H&BR locomotive using superheating	J28
Numbering of H&BR locomotives was sequential, once a locomotive was rebuilt it was added to the supplementary list and the suffix "A" added, the original number being reused for new locomotives. (Sources:)

A total of 186 engines were operated by the Hull and Barnsley Railway. On merging into the North Eastern Railway, the locomotives were briefly renumbered by adding 3000 to the original number. Following the incorporation into the London and North Eastern Railway, the surviving locomotives were assigned numbers between 2405 and 2542, in no specific order. Most except the H&BR Class F3 (LNER Class N13) were withdrawn between 1930 and 1940, the B Class beginning withdrawal earlier in 1925. The last F3 was withdrawn in 1956.

== See also ==
- Locomotives of the North Eastern Railway
- Locomotives of the London and North Eastern Railway

== Sources ==
- Dodsworth, Ted (1990), The train now standing (Vol1) : The Life and Times of the Hull and Barnsley Railway, Hutton Press, social history, posters, postcards, publications and other emphera associated with the H&BR, also King George Dock
- Parkes, G.D. (1970) [1946], The Hull & Barnsley Railway, The Oakwood Press, reprint, early history of the line, concise full description, references to early literature and periodical sources
- Prattley, Ron (1997), Locomotives of the Hull and Barnsley Railway : a concise guide to the locomotives designed by Kirtley, Stirling and Kitson, Historical Model Railway Society, non technical description of all types with basic side plan drawings with dimensions, notes on livery and external appearance, numbering details and withdrawal dates
- "The Hull & Barnsley Railway". The London & North Eastern Railway (LNER) Encyclopedia, www.lner.info.
