= DWWR 4 =

Irish Rail steam locomotive

DW&WR 4
Type and origin
- Power type: Steam
- Designer: Grierson
- Builder: Kitson & Co.
- Serial number: 3686/7
- Build date: 1897
- Total produced: 2
- Rebuilder: Grand Canal Street
- Rebuild date: 1908
Specifications
- Configuration
  - Whyte: 0-6-2T; 0-6-0
- Gauge: 5 ft 3 in (1,600 mm)
- Driver dia.: 4 ft 9 in (1,450 mm)
- Trailing dia.: (not known)
- Length: 33 ft (10,000 mm) (est.)
- Loco weight: 47 long tons (48 t)
- Water cap.: 2,000 imp gal (9,100 L; 2,400 US gal)
- Boiler pressure: 160 lbf/in^{2} (1.10 MPa)
- Cylinders: 2
- Cylinder size: 18 1/2 in × 26 in (470 mm × 660 mm)
Performance figures
- Tractive effort: 21,230 lbf (94.44 kN)
Career
- Operators: DW&WR; DSER; GSR; CIÉ
- Class: J1 (Inchicore)
- Power class: C/E
- Number in class: 2
- Numbers: 4, 5; 448, 449 (GSR)
- Locale: Ireland
- Withdrawn: 1950
- Disposition: Both scrapped
- Figures are following rebuild to 0-6-0 in 1908

Dublin, Wicklow and Wexford Railway (DW&WR) 4 and 5 were a pair of 0-6-2T tank locomotives purchased from Kitson & Co. in 1897 and rebuilt as 0-6-0 tender Locomotives in 1908 due to a tendency to derail. Renumbered by Great Southern Railways to 448 and 449 they survived until 1940 and 1950 respectively.

== History ==
=== Background ===
Thomas Grierson rose to become Chief Engineer of the DW&WR in 1894/95 taking combined responsibility for both the civil and mechanical sides of the operation, these roles being separate before his tenure and were to again be separated after he left in May 1897. (Note: Shepherd and Beesley comment that for most companies who combined these roles the result was generally not successful.) Grierson was a civil engineer and decisions and views he held were to be questioned. He is understood to have held the theory that tenders were less economic than tank engines due to the need to haul around the weight of the tender. (Note: This was different from more conventional thinking that tank engines are generally better for short trips, suburban and branch line work while tender engines are better suited to longer main line trips with their higher water capacity and possibly better running at speed). The error of ordering Express passenger 4-4-0s and the selection and issues with this class seem to have sullied Grierson's reputation.

Shepherd and Beesley suggested the DW&WR had identified a need for additional goods and tank locomotives in March 1896, with the construction of the extension to Waterford and the haulage of heavy goods from New Ross to Palace East being major considerations.

=== Design and Procurement ===
To satisfy motive powers requirements Grierson ordered two 0-6-2T locomotives from Kitson & Co. for £2,575 each in April 1896. (Note: Ahrons indicated he had no idea what purpose these particular pair of engines were ordered for.) Their design were based on the eight Class A delivered to the Lancashire, Derbyshire and East Coast Railway from 1895, (Note: A follow on batch of 15 were diverted to the Hull and Barnsley Railway in 1899 as Class F1 due to non-payment issues) with the Rhondda and Swansea Bay Railway also acquiring some of the type.

With hindsight Shepherd and Beesley classified the order as "Grierson's Folly".

=== Service as 0-6-2T ===
In the event by the time they arrived in April 1897, Grierson was on the cusp of departure and Robert Cronin about to take over as Locomotive Superintendent. These locomotives, No. 4 Lismore and No. 5Clonmel, were found to have problems by exceeding the maximum axle load and having issues with hot-running axle boxes. They were also prone to derailments, caused by the excess weight on the trailing axle. Following a derailment at North Wall yard| in June 1897 a weighing at the Great Southern and Western Railway Inchicore Railway Works showed the weights of the locomotives to be 64 long tons 8 cwt (144,300 lb or 65.4 t) and 64 long tons 0 cwt (143,400 lb or 65 t) respectively, far in excess of the 60 long tons 13 cwt (135,900 lb or 61.6 t) that had been specified to Kitson by Grierson. They were subsequently allocated to Harcourt Street.

=== Rebuild and service as 0-6-0 ===
After the short period of only eleven years in 1908 Cronin rebuilt the locomotives as 0-6-0 tender engines with Belpaire boilers, the new tenders being built by the Grand Canal Street railway works. The rebuild produced engines of strong power however they were noted for very high coal and water consumption and a tendency to stall on the gradient if the boiler pressure dropped. There was usually no trouble restarting once the boiler pressure had been regained. They were based at Bray and used on cattle specials and goods trains to Shillelagh.

On the merger of the railways in Ireland to Great Southern Railways in 1925 these locomotives became allocated class 448 with numbers 448 and 449. No. 4/448 was withdrawn in 1940. No. 5/449 survived the nationalisation to CIÉ in 1945 and in an assessment in 1948 the rating of the class was "quite good". That did not seem to stop No. 5/449 being withdrawn in 1950. (Note: Being the single member of class and therefore non-standard would have been a factor in consideration of withdrawal)

Engine number 4/448 had a couple of other milestones. It was the last locomotive to be rebuilt at Grand Canal Street and was the final locomotive to retain Dublin and South Eastern Railway (DSER) livery until being painted GSR grey in 1930.
