= J80 =

J80 may refer to:

== Vehicles ==
- J/80, a sailboat class that is trailerable and is used for racing
- Ford Spectron (model code J80), a Mazda-designed van sold by Ford in Asia
- Lexus LX (J80), a luxury SUV
- Toyota Land Cruiser (J80), an offroad SUV
- LNER Class J80, a British locomotive class used by H&BR
- J80, a Gaza-domestic Hamas-produced Palestinian artillery rocket used in the 2019 and 2014 conflicts

== Other uses ==
- Sainte-Hélène Observatory (observatory code J80), Sainte-Hélène, Gironde, Nouvelle-Aquitaine, France; see List of observatory codes
- Parabidiminished rhombicosidodecahedron (Johnson solid J_{80})

== See also ==
- Shenyang J-8 mk 0 "Finback", a Chinese jet fighter plane, a variant of the MiG-21
- J8 (disambiguation)
- 80 (disambiguation)
- J (disambiguation)
