= LD&ECR Class A =

Class of British 0-6-2T steam locomotive

LD&ECR class A LNER Class N6
Type and origin
- Power type: Steam
- Designer: Kitson & Co.
- Builder: Kitson & Co.
- Serial number: 3605–3612, 3903–3904, 3909–3911, 3919–3923
- Build date: 1895 (8) 1900 (10)
- Total produced: 18
Specifications
- Configuration
  - Whyte: 0-6-2T
  - UIC: C1 t
- Gauge: 4 ft 8 1/2 in (1,435 mm)
- Driver dia.: 4 ft 9 in (1.448 m)
- Trailing dia.: 3 ft 9 in (1.143 m)
- Loco weight: 58 long tons 4 cwt (130,400 lb or 59.1 t)
- Fuel type: Coal
- Fuel capacity: 3 long tons 0 cwt (6,700 lb or 3 t)
- Water cap.: 1,825 imp gal (8,300 L; 2,192 US gal)
- Firebox
  - Grate area: 20.5 sq ft (1.90 m^{2})
- Boiler pressure: 170 psi (1.17 MPa)
- Heating surface: 1,289 sq ft (119.8 m^{2})
- Cylinders: Two, inside
- Cylinder size: 18 in × 26 in (457 mm × 660 mm)
- Valve gear: Allan
- Valve type: Balanced slide valves
Performance figures
- Tractive effort: 21,355 lbf (94.99 kN)
Career
- Operators: Lancashire, Derbyshire and East Coast Railway; → Great Central Railway; → London and North Eastern Railway
- Class: LD&ECR: A; LNER: N6
- Numbers: LD&ECR: 1–8, 19–28; GCR: 1145B–1147B, 1154–1168 (1164–68 renumbered 40–43, 66); LNER: 6414–6412, 6154–6153, 5040–5043, 5066
- Withdrawn: 1933–1938
- Disposition: All scrapped

The LD&ECR class A (LNER Class N6) was a class of 0-6-2T steam locomotives of the Lancashire, Derbyshire and East Coast Railway. An initial batch of eight was ordered and built in 1895. An order for 15 more was placed in 1899 but five of these were not delivered because the LD&ECR was unable to pay for them. The undelivered locomotives were re-sold by Kitson & Co. to the Hull and Barnsley Railway and became H&BR Class F1 (LNER Class N11). There are some detail differences between the LD&ECR class A and the H&BR Class F1 but these were the result of later modifications.
