= GCR Class 2 =

Class of British steam locomotives (1887–1894)

GCR Class 2 and 2A LNER Class D7
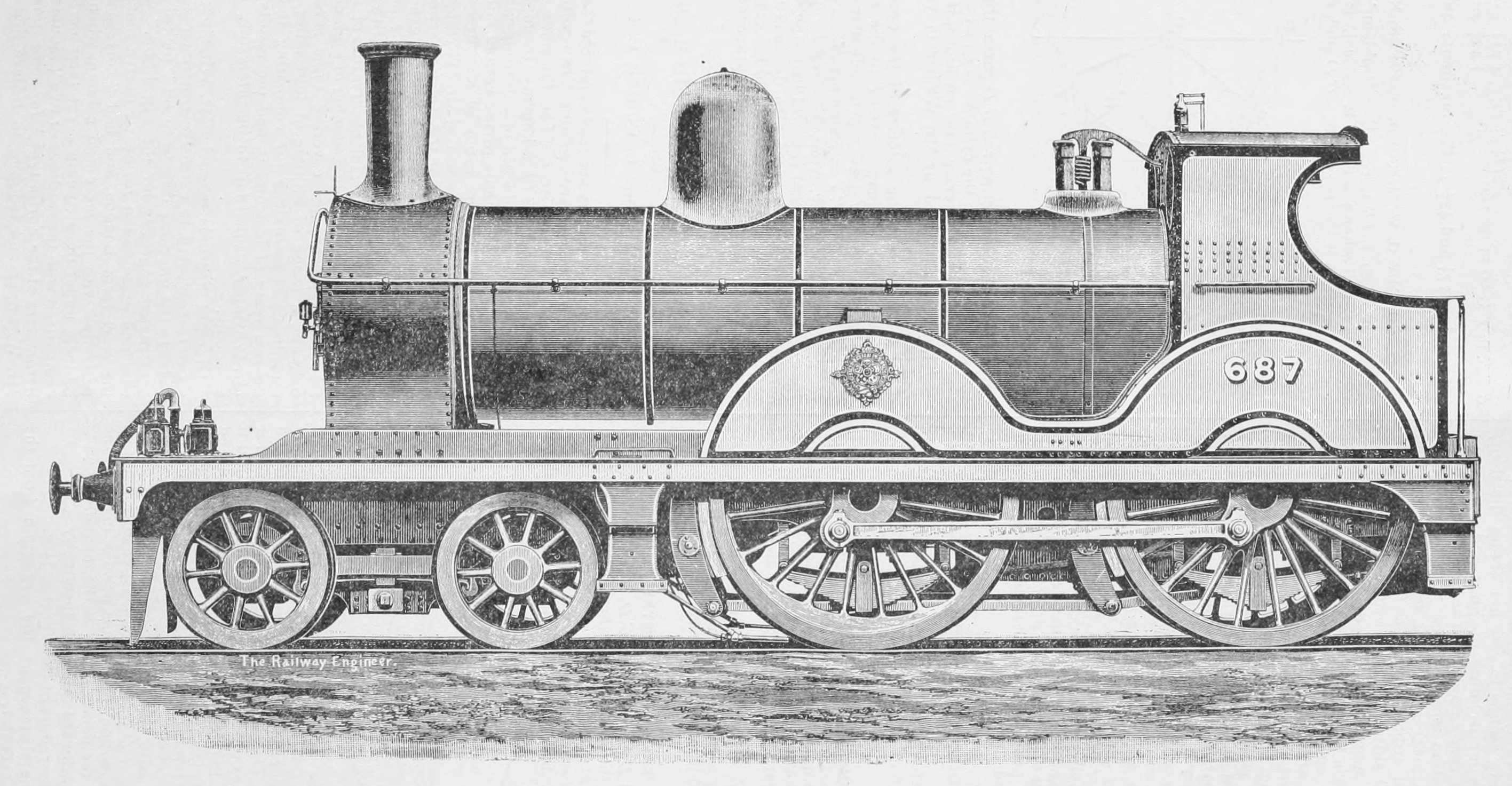
- Engraving of the No. 687 – the last Gorton-built example
Type and origin
- Power type: Steam
- Designer: Thomas Parker
- Builder: Class 2: Gorton Works (12); Kitson and Company (13); Class 2A: Gorton Works
- Serial number: Kitson 3010, 3440–3451
- Build date: 1887 (1), 1890–1894
- Total produced: Class 2: 25; Class 2A: 6
Specifications
- Configuration
  - Whyte: 4-4-0
  - UIC: 2′B n2
- Gauge: 4 ft 8 1/2 in (1,435 mm)
- Leading dia.: 3 ft 6 in (1.067 m)
- Driver dia.: 6 ft 9 in (2.057 m)
- Wheelbase: Loco: 21 ft 9 in (6.63 m)
- Axle load: 16 long tons 0 cwt (35,800 lb or 16.3 t)
- Loco weight: 46 long tons 0 cwt (103,000 lb or 46.7 t)
- Tender weight: 37 long tons 6 cwt (83,600 lb or 37.9 t)
- Firebox
  - Grate area: 18.3 sq ft (1.70 m^{2})
- Boiler pressure: 160 psi (1.10 MPa)
- Cylinders: Two, inside
- Cylinder size: 18 in × 26 in (457 mm × 660 mm)
- Valve gear: Stephenson
- Valve type: Slide valves
Performance figures
- Tractive effort: 14,144 lbf (62.9 kN)
Career
- Operators: Great Central Railway; → London and North Eastern Railway
- Class: GCR: 2 and 2A; LNER: D7
- Numbers: GCR: 561–567, 682–687, 700–712, 688–693
- Withdrawn: 1926–1939
- Disposition: All original locomotives scrapped; new one under construction

The GCR Class 2 steam locomotive was derived from a Kitson (Leeds) built/Thomas Parker designed prototype 4-4-0 locomotive No. 561, (the first single frame locomotive built for the MSLR) exhibited in Manchester in 1887. The design led to the production of a series of express steam locomotives built between 1890 and 1894 for use on the Manchester, Sheffield and Lincolnshire Railway, later the Great Central Railway. The last batch of six, built 1894, had larger bearings for the coupled wheels, coil springs (instead of leaf springs) for the driving axle and was classified 2A.

When first built, the Class 2s were used on the MSLR main express trains. They regularly hauled the Manchester to King's Cross expresses to and from Grantham. Early records suggest that they were very economical locomotives during this period.

These locomotives were superseded by the Pollitt D6 and Robinson D9 locomotives in 1895 and 1901 respectively and were reduced to stopping and secondary services.

== LNER ownership ==
They passed to the London and North Eastern Railway (LNER) in 1923 and both classes were re-classified D7. During the early years of the LNER (before 1928), the D7s qualified for the LNER's green passenger locomotive livery. This led to the Immingham D7s acquiring the nickname of 'Green Bogies'. By this time, they were already obsolete, with withdrawals starting in 1926 and the last D7 being withdrawn in 1939 with no preserved examples.

== New locomotive ==
A project was launched in 2024 to build a new member of this class (No. 567) to modern engineering standards (using metric steel and specifications) for running on the Great Central Railway. It is a semi-new build locomotive being erected at Ruddington on the GCR Northern section. The build, with a potential boiler, cylinder block and tender chassis already found, and the rest costing about £400,000.

== See also ==
- Steam locomotives of the 21st century
