= LNER Thompson Class A2/2 =

British steam locomotive

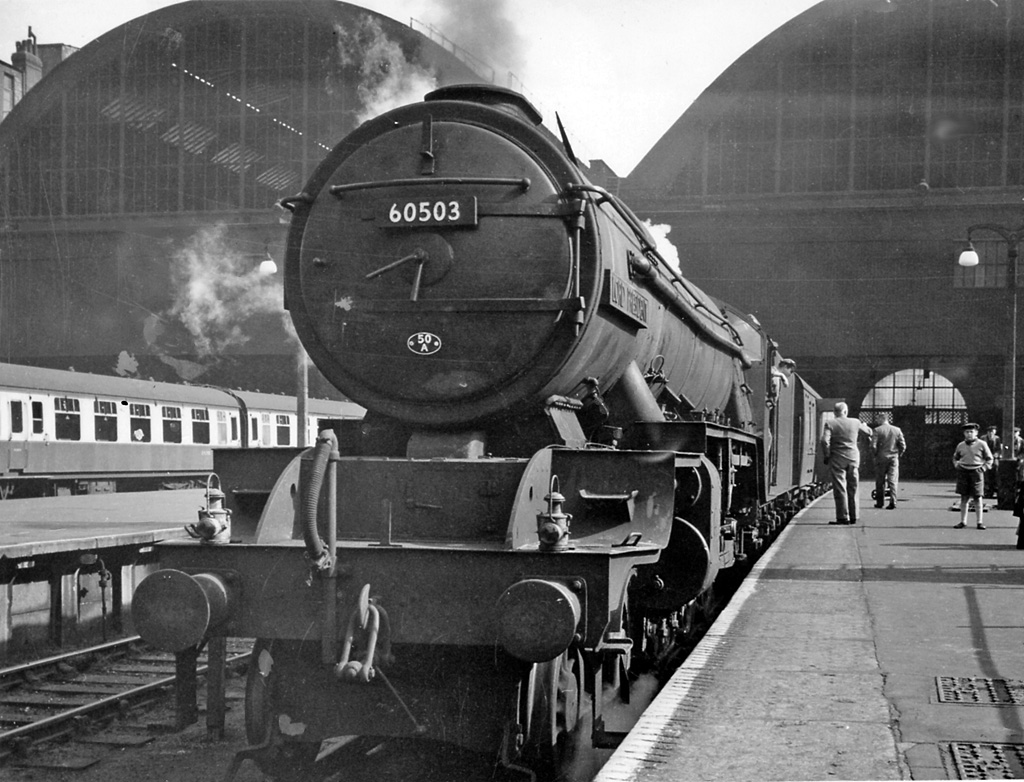
- No. 60503 'Lord President' at London King's Cross railway station in 1958
Type and origin
- Power type: Steam
- Designer: Edward Thompson
- Build date: 1934-1936
- Total produced: 6
- Rebuild date: 1943-1944
Specifications
- Configuration
  - Whyte: 4-6-2
  - UIC: 2’C1 h3
- Gauge: 4 ft 8 1/2 in (1,435 mm)
- Leading dia.: 3 ft 2 in (0.965 m)
- Driver dia.: 6 ft 2 in (1.880 m)
- Trailing dia.: 3 ft 8 in (1.118 m)
- Wheelbase: 63 ft 0.875 in (19.22 m)
- Length: 72 ft 8.375 in (22.16 m)
- Adhesive weight: 66 long tons (67 t; 74 short tons)
- Loco weight: 101.5 long tons (103.1 t; 113.7 short tons)
- Fuel type: Coal
- Fuel capacity: 9 long tons (9.1 t; 10 short tons)
- Water cap.: 5,000 imp gal (22,700 L; 6,000 US gal)
- Firebox
  - Grate area: 50 sq ft (4.6 m^{2})
- Boiler pressure: 225 psi (1.55 MPa)
- Heating surface
  - Firebox: 237 sq ft (22.0 m^{2})
  - Tubes: 1,004.5 sq ft (93.32 m^{2})
  - Flues: 1,211.57 sq ft (112.559 m^{2})
  - Total surface: 2,453 sq ft (227.9 m^{2})
- Superheater
  - Heating area: 619.67 sq ft (57.569 m^{2})
- Cylinders: Three
- Cylinder size: 20 in × 26 in (508 mm × 660 mm)
- Valve gear: Walschaerts
- Valve type: Piston valves
Performance figures
- Tractive effort: 40,318 lbf (179.34 kN)
Career
- Operators: London and North Eastern Railway; British Railways
- Class: A2/2
- Power class: BR: 8P7F
- Numbers: LNER: 501-506; BR: 60501-60506
- Withdrawn: 1959 – 1961
- Disposition: All scrapped

The London and North Eastern Railway Class A2/2 was a class of six 4-6-2 steam locomotives rebuilt by Edward Thompson in 1943 and 1944 from his predecessor Sir Nigel Gresley's P2 Class of 2-8-2 express passenger locomotives. The rebuilds improved reliability and reduced maintenance, but also suffered from a variety of issues during service, and all were withdrawn and scrapped between 1959 and 1961.

== Background ==
On taking up office as chief mechanical engineer of the London and North Eastern Railway in April 1941, Edward Thompson inherited a railway with many ageing locomotives, most dating from the pre-grouping era, struggling against wartime material and manpower shortages and skyrocketing passenger and freight traffic demands.

Nigel Gresley's Class P2 were a class of six non-identical, highly powerful and capable locomotives which had poor availability and required high maintenance. The engines suffered from hot axle boxes (an issue found at Vitry), rapid wear in journals and connecting rods from working the Edinburgh to Aberdeen mainline, and fractured joints in steam pipes. Their large grate also consumed 75–90 lb (34–41 kg) of coal per mile, making it extremely difficult for the fireman to maintain steam. In 1935, Oliver Bulleid had Teddy Windle go to Cowlairs to inspect No. 2001 Cock o' the North, which had a cracked pony truck, as well as Dundee to inspect No. 2002 Earl Marischal. Crank axle failures were commonplace with the class, with one such accident happened to No. 2005 Thane of Fife on 18 July 1939, and again with No. 2004 Mons Meg on 27 May 1942 and No. 2003 Lord President on 29 July 1944. Suggestions of other failures exist but were not confirmed by surviving records.

Contrarily, O. S. Nock stated that the P2 class "rode easily and elegantly around the sharpest curves." In either event, rather than transfer the class to other duties on the East Coast Main Line south of Newcastle where this would have been less of a problem, Thompson saw this as a chance to implement his own locomotive design.

It is also said that he proposed an unstreamlined mixed traffic version of Nigel Gresley's A4 Class Pacifics with 6 ft 2 in (1.880 m) driving wheels, but new construction would not have been authorised at this time and therefore rebuilt the P2 locomotives as Pacifics to implement his own design.

== Design ==
In place of the maintenance-heavy Gresley conjugated valve gear were three cylinders with independent Walschaerts valve gear. The cylinders had their bore reduced to 20 in (510 mm) and the valve diameter enlarged to 10 in (250 mm) with separate castings, compared to the monobloc casting for Gresley's conjugated valve gear. However, wartime economies meant their former short connecting rods were retained, requiring the outside cylinders to be moved back with the middle cylinder driving the lead axle as a divided drive. The extended look was not seen commonly on the LNER, and was considered ungainly.

The pony truck and front coupled wheels of the original design were replaced by a newly designed bogie to Thompson's side support pattern design. The locomotives retained their eight wheeled tenders, and were fitted with a Kylchap exhaust. The boiler barrel was shortened and pressure increased from 220 psi (1.52 MPa) to 225 psi (1.55 MPa). These changes gave a tractive effort of 40,318 lbf (179.34 kN).

The first locomotive to be rebuilt at Doncaster Works was No. 2005, Thane of Fife, as it had the lowest annual mileage and was reputedly the worst of the P2s, ordered in October 1942 and completed in January 1943. After trials the remaining five P2 locomotives began rebuilding in September 1943 and had all entered traffic during 1944.

== Performance ==
The first rebuild, No. 2005 Thane of Fife emerged partway through 1943 and achieved 45,732 miles by the end of the year, significantly outperforming the P2s. Arthur Peppercorn presented the board with an operation report for the rebuilt locomotive with great praise, and the board approved rebuilding of the remainder. The rebuilds would become some of the best performing locomotives with high mileage and availability.

Claims that the rebuilds could no longer be used on the Edinburgh-Aberdeen mainline due to their reduced adhesion are unfounded, as it is said in the LNER Board Notes "The converted engine (No. 2005 Thane of Fife) has been in service for some time, and has proved entirely satisfactory in that it has not only been able to handle loads at least equal to the stipulated maximum load of the P2 class, on the Edinburgh and Aberdeen section, but it has also been remarkably free from mechanical troubles so that it has been consistently available for traffic."

A set of comparison trials were undertaken in May and June 1945, the first comparing the A1/1 with an A4 and the second comparing an A4, the converted A2/1 and A2/2 on identical express passenger and freight duties, overseen by Arthur Peppercorn and Bert Spencer. Representing the classes in the second trials were A4 No. 2512 Silver Fox, A2/1 No. 3697 Duke of Rothsay and A2/2 No. 2003 Lord President. During the trials, the A4 performed the best on the express passenger service, while the A2/1 performed best on the freight services, with the A2/2 being in third place on both trials. Locomotive Running Superintendent George Musgrave commented that "During the trials, the A2/1 and A2/2 Class engines did not have to be worked to their full capacity. It was considered by the Locomotive Inspector that they both worked the freight easier than the A4."

Cecil J. Allen acknowledges the design with a log No. 60502 Earl Marischal reaching 95 mph (153 km/h) with a 220 ton gross load train.

However, the engines had a high power to weight ratio and were "light on their feet" and extremely prone to slipping, limiting their haulage capacity and unable to reach their theoretical limit, although coal consumption was reduced and reliability improved. The divided drive design worked well, although the frame required modifications due to flexing and stress damage from the stretched design. During retirement, Thompson came to believe that the divided drive was not ideal and the solution adopted by Peppercorn and his team was better. According to O.S. Nock, they "acquired a particularly bad reputation for wild and unsafe riding at high speed!"

In addition, due to prejudice against the rebuilt locomotives, especially in Scottish depots, by 1949 the class was sent to England, with three stationed at York and three at Peterborough New England shed. In service Earl Marischal was the only A2/2 to cover over one million miles, 360,907 mi (580,824 km) as a P2 and 673,947 mi (1,084,613 km) as an A2/2.

== Withdrawal ==
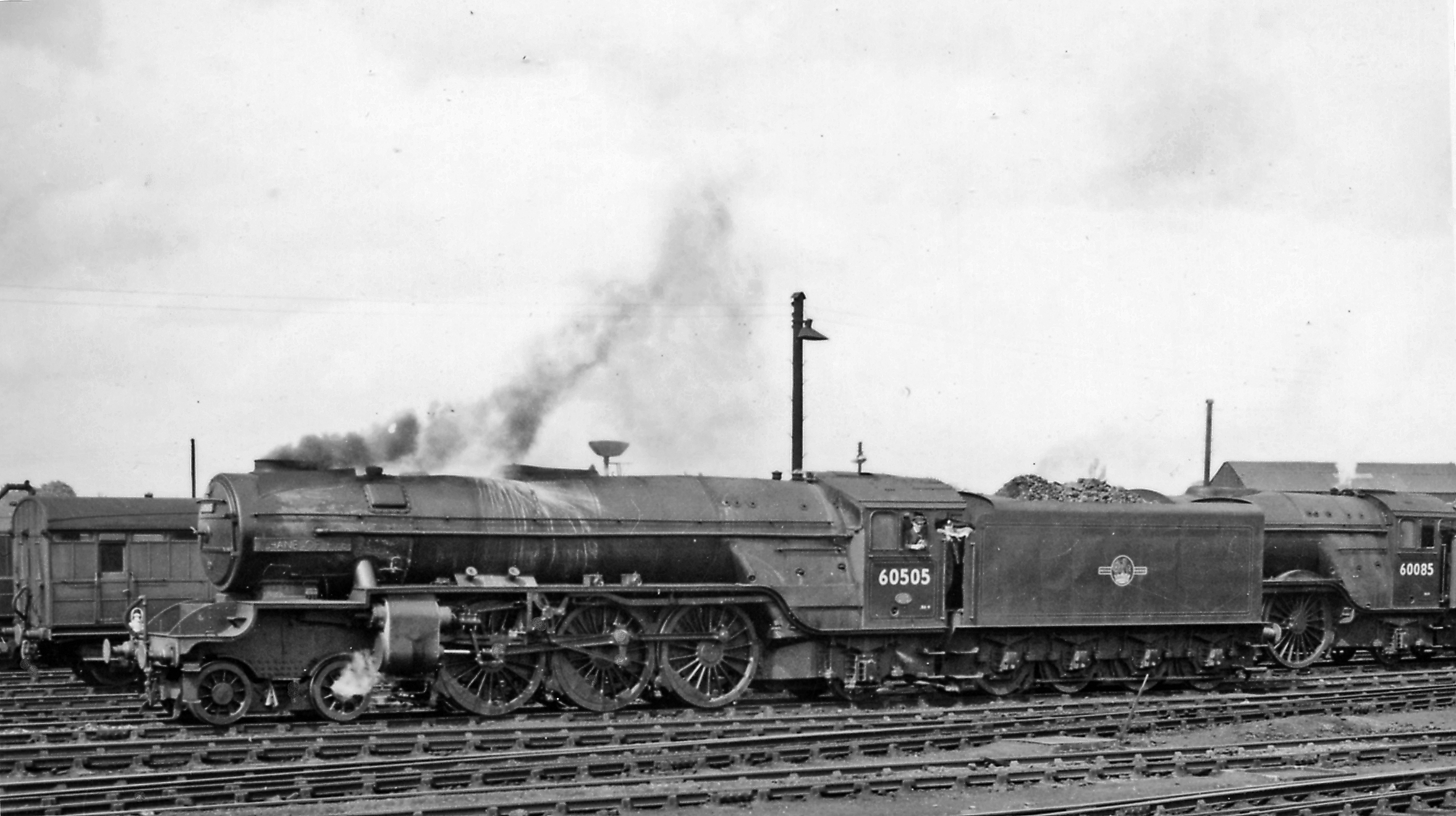
No. 60505 'Thane of Fife' in York Locomotive Yard 26 May 1958.

Withdrawals began in 1959 with 60505 Thane of Fife and 60503 Lord President on 10 November and 27 November respectively. 60501 Cock o' the North was withdrawn in 1960, while 60502, 60504, 60506 were withdrawn in 1961, with 60502 going last on 3 July.

Year	Quantity in service at start of year	Quantity withdrawn	Locomotive numbers	Notes
1959	6	2	60503/05	
1960	4	1	60501	
1961	3	3	60502/04/06	

== Stock list ==
The LNER/BR stock list was as follows:

Original No.	LNER No. (Intermediate No.)	BR No.	Name	Rebuild Date	Withdrawn	Disposal Date
2001	501	60501	Cock o' the North	September 1944	8 February 1960	28 February 1960
2002	502	60502	Earl Marischal	June 1944	3 July 1961	31 July 1961
2003	503	60503	Lord President	December 1944	27 November 1959	30 November 1959
2004	504	60504	Mons Meg	November 1944	23 January 1961	31 January 1961
2005	505 (994)	60505	Thane of Fife	January 1943	10 November 1959	30 November 1959
2006	506	60506	Wolf of Badenoch	May 1944	4 April 1961	30 April 1961

== Accidents ==
- On 16 March 1951, No. 60501 Cock o' the North was involved in an accident shortly after departing Doncaster railway station on the 10:04 Doncaster to King's Cross. The cause was found to be poor maintenance of the crossover.

== Models ==
Apple Green Engines produce a ready-to-run model of the A2/2 in 4 mm scale. PDK, DJH, and Millholme sell 4 mm scale kits of the A2/2. Crownline have also produced a 4 mm scale kit in the past, but this is no longer available.

DJH also sell a kit of the A2/2 for O gauge (7 mm scale).

Hornby announced that they will produce a number of A2/2 models for their 2020 range, these becoming available in 2021. The initial releases included:

R3830 - 60501 'Cock o' the North' in BR green with early emblem

R3831 - 60505 'Thane of Fife' in BR green with late crest

R3977 - 60502 'Earl Marischal' in BR green with late crest

Each release included variations based on prototype allocations and modifications through the life of the class (boiler types and fittings).
