= H&BR Class G3 =

Class of British steam locomotives

H&BR Class G3 LNER Class J75
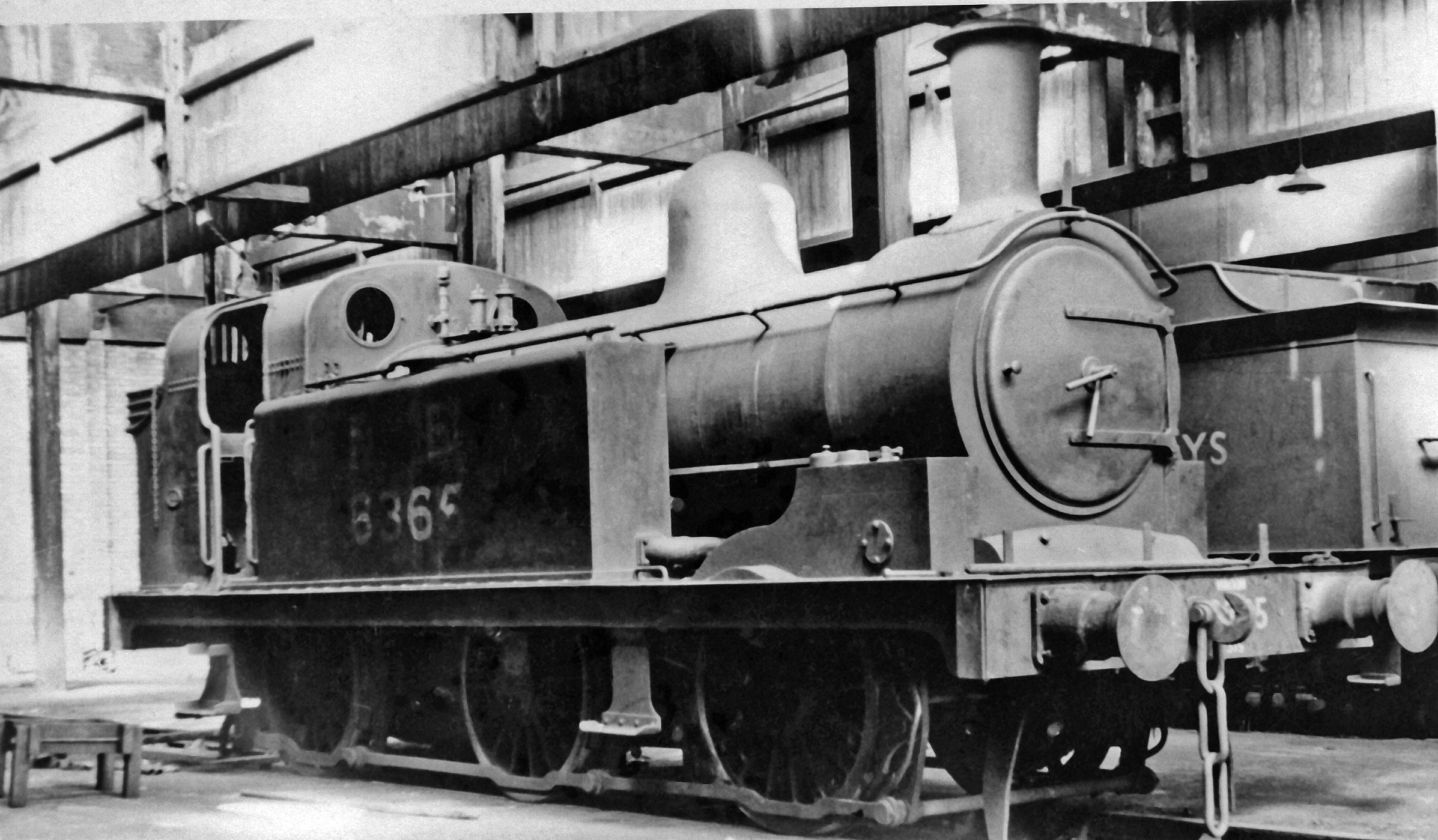
- No. 8365, which ended its career at the Walton-on-the-Hill depot of the Cheshire Lines
Type and origin
- Power type: Steam
- Designer: Matthew Stirling
- Builder: Yorkshire Engine Company; Kitson & Co.
- Build date: 1901-1908
- Total produced: 16
Specifications
- Configuration
  - Whyte: 0-6-0T
- Gauge: 4 ft 8 1/2 in (1,435 mm)
- Driver dia.: 4 ft 6 in (1.37 m)
- Length: 32 ft 2 1/2 in (9.82 m)
- Loco weight: 47.35 long tons (48.11 t)
- Fuel type: coal
- Fuel capacity: 3 long tons (3.0 t)
- Water cap.: 850 imp gal (3,900 L; 1,020 US gal)
- Firebox
  - Grate area: 16 1/4 sq ft (1.51 m^{2})
- Boiler pressure: As built: 150 psi (1.0 MPa); Rebuilt: 175 psi (1.21 MPa)
- Cylinders: Two, inside
- Cylinder size: 18 in × 26 in (460 mm × 660 mm)
- Valve gear: Stephenson valve gear
Performance figures
- Tractive effort: As built: 19,890 lbf (88.5 kN); Rebuilt: 23,205 lbf (103.22 kN)

The Hull and Barnsley Railway Class G3, classified as Class J75 by the London and North Eastern Railway (LNER was a class of 0-6-0T steam locomotives.

== History ==
A total of 16 locomotives were built, six by the Yorkshire Engine Company in 1901-1902 and ten by Kitson & Co. in 1908. The locomotives were built with domeless boilers. Starting in 1922, when the H&BR became part of the North Eastern Railway (NER), 14 of the 16 were rebuilt with domed boilers.

=== Operation ===
The first six locomotives initially worked on the Wath and Braithwell branch lines and the second batch of ten were used for shunting at Cudworth and Hull. Following the grouping the LNER reallocated the locomotives to other locations in Eastern England, including Immingham, Boston and Peterbrorough. One locomotive, 2532, was transferred to Walton-on-the-Hill, Liverpool to work at Huskisson Dock.

=== Numbering ===
The locomotives' original numbers were 111–116 for the Yorkshire Engine Company batch and 142–151 for the Kitson batch. Under LNER ownership they were renumbered 2492–2497 and 2523–2532. The last remaining J75 was renumbered again to 8365 in 1946

=== Withdrawal ===
The first locomotive was withdrawn in 1937 and all but one of the others followed before 1939. The one locomotive in Liverpool, 8365, survived into British Railways (BR) ownership in 1948 and was withdrawn in 1949. None were preserved.
