= GCR Class 8F =

Class of British steam locomotives

GCR Class 8F LNER Class B4
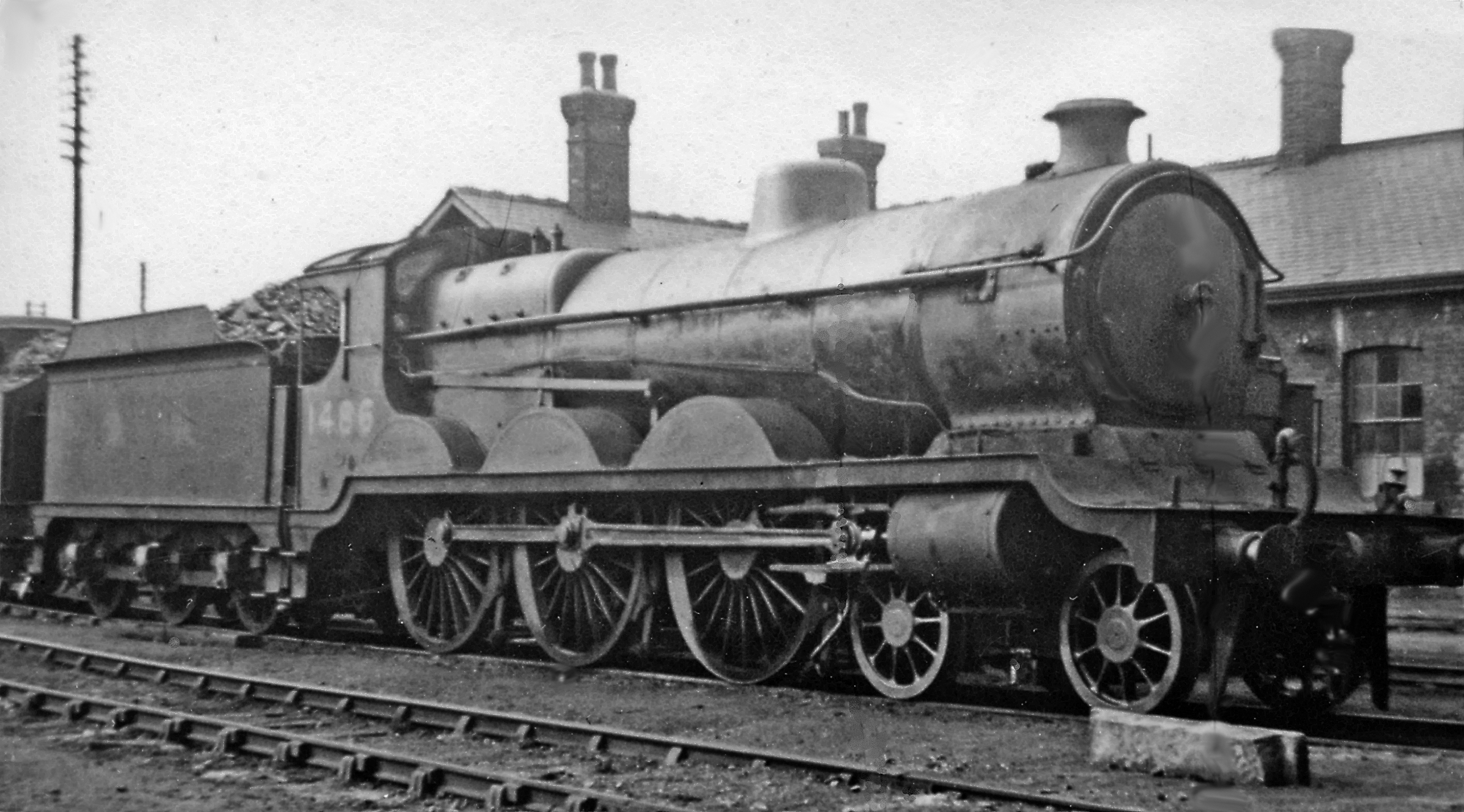
- B4 4-6-0 No. 1486 at Ardsley Locomotive Depot
Type and origin
- Power type: Steam
- Designer: John G. Robinson
- Builder: Beyer, Peacock and Company
- Order number: BP: 9458
- Serial number: 4816–4825
- Build date: June – July 1906
- Total produced: 10
Specifications
- Configuration
  - Whyte: 4-6-0
  - UIC: 2'Cn2
- Gauge: 4 ft 8 1/2 in (1,435 mm)
- Leading dia.: 3 ft 6 in (1.067 m)
- Driver dia.: 6 ft 6 in (1.981 m)
- Wheelbase: 51 ft 10 in (15.799 m)
- Length: 61 ft 11.25 in (18.879 m)
- Height: 13 ft 0 in (3.962 m)
- Adhesive weight: 54 long tons 18 cwt (123,000 lb or 55.8 t)
- Loco weight: 70 long tons 14 cwt (158,400 lb or 71.8 t)
- Tender weight: 48 long tons 6 cwt (108,200 lb or 49.1 t)
- Fuel type: Coal
- Fuel capacity: 6 long tons 0 cwt (13,400 lb or 6.1 t)
- Water cap.: 4,000 imp gal (18,000 L; 4,800 US gal)
- Boiler
  - Diameter: 4 ft 9.5 in (1,460 mm) to 5 ft (1,500 mm)
- Boiler pressure: 180 lbf/in^{2} (1.24 MPa)
- Heating surface
  - Firebox: 133 sq ft (12.4 m^{2})
  - Total surface: As built: 1,911 sq ft (177.5 m^{2}); Superheated: 1,482 sq ft (137.7 m^{2})
- Superheater
  - Heating area: 242 sq ft (22.5 m^{2})
- Cylinders: Two, outside
- Cylinder size: As built: 19 in × 26 in (480 mm × 660 mm); B4/1 sub-class: 21 in × 26 in (530 mm × 660 mm)
- Valve gear: Stephenson
- Valve type: Slide, some later 10-inch (254 mm) piston valves
Career
- Operators: GCR; →LNER; →BR
- Class: GCR: 8F; LNER: B4
- Numbers: GCR: 1095–1104; LNER: 6095–6104, later 1481–1489
- Nicknames: Immingham
- Axle load class: LNER: Route Availability: 5
- Withdrawn: February 1944 (1), 1947-November 1950
- Disposition: All scrapped

The GCR Class 8F was a class of ten 4-6-0 locomotives built for the Great Central Railway in 1906 by Beyer, Peacock and Company to the design of John G. Robinson for working fast goods and fish trains. They passed to the London and North Eastern Railway at the 1923 grouping and received the classification 'B4'.

== Design ==
These engines were very similar to two locomotives of an earlier 4-6-0 type the GCR had (the GCR Class 8C, later LNER class B1) except that they had smaller driving wheels.

They were built with a saturated boiler, inside slide valves and Stephenson valve gear, two outside cylinders connected to 6-foot-7-inch (2.007 m) diameter driving wheels.

== LNER ownership ==
The ten locomotives were renumbered by the LNER by adding 5000 to their GCR numbers; and classified as B4.

== Modifications ==
Between 1925 and 1928 the whole class received superheated boilers, but six received 10-inch piston valves and 21-inch cylinders giving rise to two LNER sub-classes B4/1 and B4/2.

The LNER had designed a new type of superheated boiler (Diagram 16) based on the old design (Diagram 15). These were used on the B1 and B4 class locomotives; no more of this type of boiler was made after 1932, and so to keep the B1 and B4s in service during World War II, some Diagram 15 boilers were modified for use with these locomotives.

== Allocation and work ==
The class were originally used on fish trains between the port of Grimsby and London and Manchester although they were also found to be successful passenger locomotives. No. 1097 was also chosen to haul the special train at the inauguration ceremony for the new port of Immingham in 1906, and was named ‘Immingham’ thereafter, giving the name to the whole class. After grouping the class was transferred to Ardsley, South Yorkshire and did much useful work in the West Riding of Yorkshire.

== Withdrawal ==
No.6095 was withdrawn in 1939, but was reinstated three months later due to the outbreak of war and an expected shortage of locomotive power. After a collision at Woodhead in 1944, No.6095 was officially withdrawn. The remaining 9 were renumbered 1481-1489 in order of construction in 1946. They were withdrawn between 1947 and 1950. The last withdrawal, No.(6)1482(GCR No.1097) Immingham was in 1950, with Immingham being the last GCR 4-6-0 to be withdrawn.
