= LNER Class P2 =

Class of 6 three-cylinder 2-8-2 locomotives

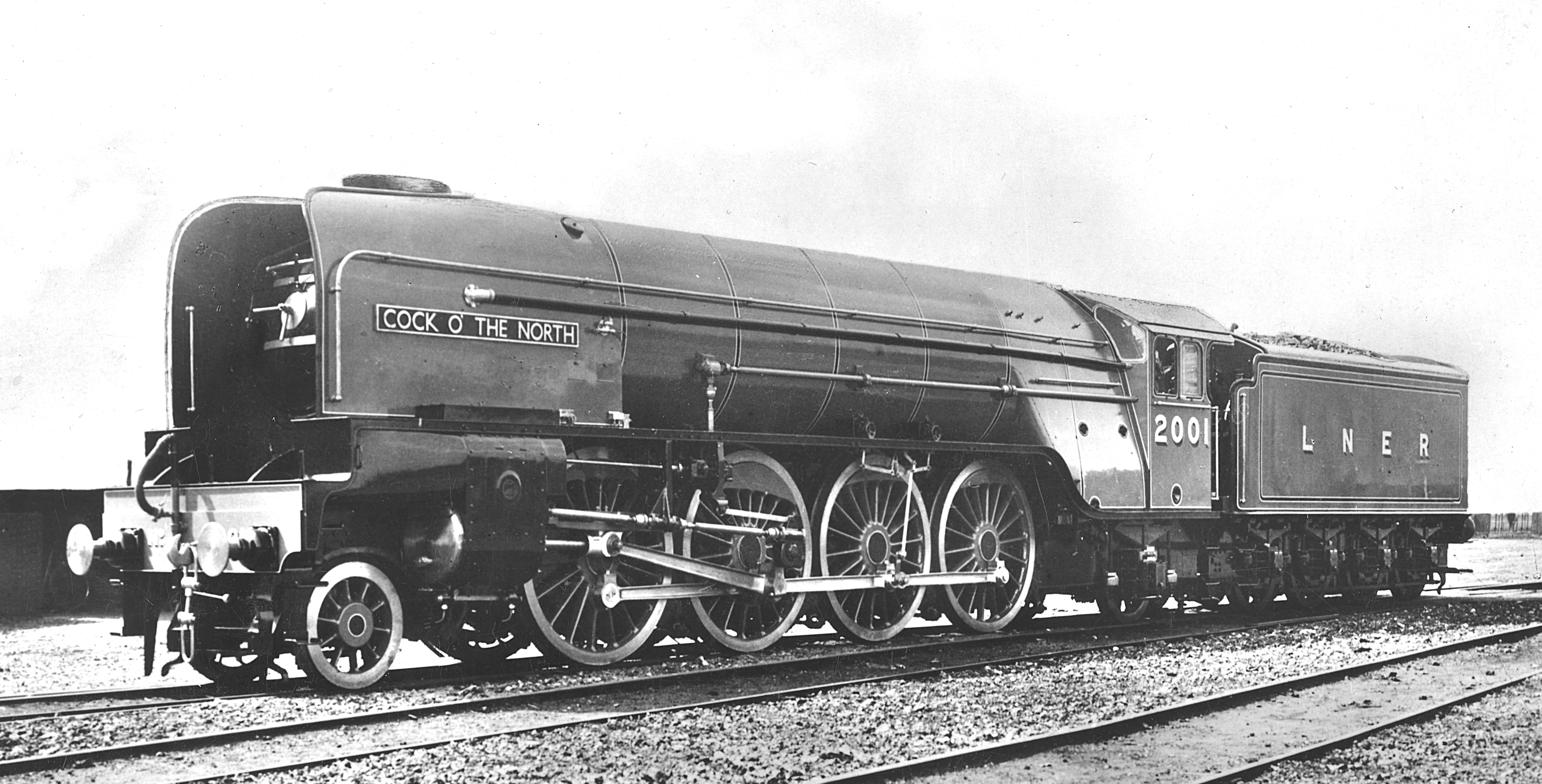
- LNER P2 No. 2001, Cock O' The North
Type and origin
- Power type: Steam
- Designer: Nigel Gresley
- Builder: Doncaster Works
- Build date: 1934-1936
- Total produced: 6
Specifications
- Configuration
  - Whyte: 2-8-2
- Leading dia.: 3 ft 2 in (0.97 m)
- Driver dia.: 6 ft 2 in (1.88 m)
- Trailing dia.: 3 ft 8 in (1.12 m)
- Wheelbase: 37 ft 11 in (11.56 m) engine 16 ft 0 in (4.88 m) tender 64 ft 0.875 in (19.53 m) total
- Axle load: 20 long tons (20.3 t; 22.4 short tons) locomotive approx.
- Loco weight: 110 long tons 5 cwt (247,000 lb or 112 t) max.
- Tender weight: 55 long tons 6 cwt (123,900 lb or 56.2 t) max.
- Firebox
  - Grate area: 50 sq ft (4.6 m^{2})
- Boiler: 6 ft 5 in (1.96 m) max. diameter
- Boiler pressure: 220 psi (1.5 MPa)
- Heating surface
  - Firebox: 237 sq ft (22.0 m^{2})
  - Tubes: 1,354.2 sq ft (125.81 m^{2})
  - Flues: 1,122.8 sq ft (104.31 m^{2})
  - Total surface: 3,349.5 sq ft (311.18 m^{2})
- Superheater
  - Heating area: 635.5 sq ft (59.04 m^{2})
- Cylinders: 3
- Cylinder size: 21 in × 26 in (530 mm × 660 mm)
- Valve gear: No. 2001 as built: Lentz rotary cam No. 2001 from April 1938 and nos. 2002–6: Walschaerts outside, Gresley conjugated inside
- Valve type: No. 2001 as built: Poppet, 8 inch (inlet) and 9 inch (exhaust); No. 2001 from April 1938 and nos. 2002–6: piston valves, 9 inch
Performance figures
- Tractive effort: 43,462 lbf (193.33 kN) at 85% boiler pressure
Career
- Operators: London and North Eastern Railway
- Retired: 1943-1944
- Disposition: All original locomotives rebuilt as Thompson A2/2 Class. Two more are under construction (Note: 1 replica and 1 new build)
- Technical parameters: The Engineer. 1 June 1934 p.551 (refer to original design of No.2001)

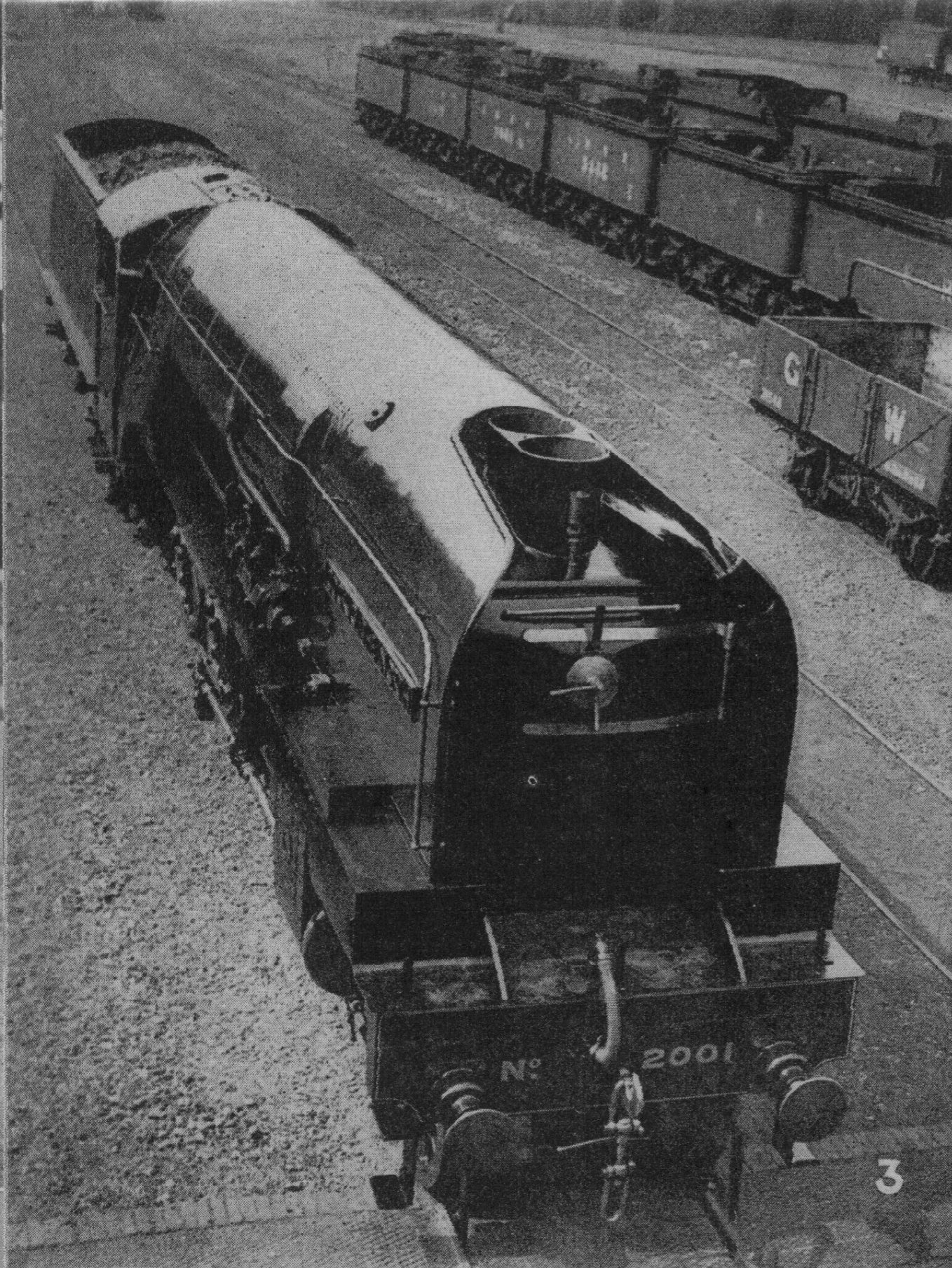
LNER P2 Cock O' The North in 1934, top view

The London and North Eastern Railway Class P2 was a class of 2-8-2 steam locomotives designed by Sir Nigel Gresley for working heavy express trains over the harsh Edinburgh to Aberdeen Line. As they were to serve on Scottish expresses, they were given famous names from Scottish lore.

Six locomotives of the class were built; introduced between 1934 and 1936. In 1936, the Class P2 were given streamlined fronts, similar to that of the Class A4. Between 1943 and 1944 the class were rebuilt under Gresley's successor Edward Thompson into the LNER Thompson Class A2/2 4-6-2 type.

== History ==
=== Design ===
The locomotives were designed by Nigel Gresley to haul express trains over the difficult Edinburgh to Aberdeen section of the London and North Eastern Railway. In the design Gresley was influenced by recent French practice, in particular passenger locomotives of the Paris à Orléans railway.

The first locomotive of the class, No. 2001 Cock o' the North, was introduced in 1934. It was built at Doncaster Works, with Lentz-type rotary-cam actuated poppet valve-gear supplied by the Associated Locomotive Equipment Company, and a double-chimney Kylchap exhaust, each chimney using four nozzle blastpipes. The chimney system was designed to take different fittings to allow experimentation with exhaust arrangements.

The boiler barrel was of the design used on Gresley Pacifics, fitted to a larger firebox. The front end design was a similar form as the Class W1 locomotive, No. 10000, derived from Dr. Dalby's wind tunnel research, and the attached tender was of the standard design used on Gresley Pacifics. The P2 introduced a vee-shaped cab front, designed to give a better view forward. (The same design was later used on the A4 and V2 express engines). No. 2001 was fitted with a Crosby chime whistle which Gresley had obtained from Captain Howey of the Romney, Hythe and Dymchurch Railway, and which was originally intended for one of that railway's Canadian Pacific style locomotives.

The second locomotive of the class, No. 2002 Earl Marischal was completed by 1935, also at Doncaster, and was fitted with Walschaerts valve gear, as used on Gresley Pacifics, and had a greater superheater heating area of 776.5 sq ft (72.14 m^{2}), obtained by using larger diameter fire tubes. At low cutoffs smoke clearance on No. 2002 was unsatisfactory: wind tunnel experiments led to an additional second pair of smoke deflectors being fitted inward of the first.

No. 2002 proved to be more efficient than 2001, due to a lower cylinder clearance volume and because the stepped-cam cutoff modifications made to No. 2001 reduced economical working relative to the infinitely variable cutoff of No. 2002. Consequently, the following locomotives were built with piston valves.

By June 1936 the third engine had been produced: No. 2003, Lord President, based on the design of No. 2002 but with the external design modified to resemble the Silver Link locomotives. (see LNER Class A4). The locomotive weight was reduced to 107 long tons 3 cwt (240,000 lb or 108.9 t). The wedge-shaped front was found to lift the engine's smoke clear of the driver's view; No. 2002 was altered to this form in 1936, and No. 2001 in 1938.

Three further locomotives, Mons Meg, Thane of Fife and Wolf of Badenoch, were under construction at Doncaster in 1936.

No. 2004 was fitted with an experimental butterfly valve blastpipe bypass, manually activated to prevent fire-lifting at high cutoffs. This was later replaced with a plug valve and higher bypass pipe diameter, but both designs had problems with sticking due to carbonised deposits. No. 2005 lacked the Kylchap double chimney of the rest of the class, and No. 2006 had a different boiler design, with a longer combustion chamber, and firebox heating area and volume of 253 sq ft (23.5 m^{2}) and 319 cu ft (9.0 m^{3}) respectively with a Robinson superheater. The production series was completed in 1936.

=== Testing, performance and service ===
Shortly after being put into service, on 19 June, No. 2001 was tested with a 19 bogie carriage train of 649 tons on a return journey between Kings Cross, Grantham and Barkston; the locomotive hauled the train at an average speed of over 50 mph, with peak speeds of over 70 mph. Drawbar pulls of around 6 tons at around 60 mph were recorded, representing a peak output of more than 2000 horsepower. In late 1934, the locomotive was sent to Vitry, France for static testing.

Point contact on the infinitely variable cams of No. 2001 led to cam damage after ~10,000 miles of service, resulting in the replacement with stepped cams giving six steps of cutoff (12, 18, 25, 35, 45 and 75%). By 1939 No. 2001 had had its rotary-cam poppet-valve valvegear replaced with Walschaerts gear.

In 1939, E. H. Livesay reported from the footplate on the performance of No. 2004 Mons Meg on the early morning 'Aberdonian' non-stop from Edinburgh to Dundee – a train with gross weight of 320 tons. Peak speeds of over 60 mph were noted, with 55 mph on a 1 in 100 gradient, and an average speed of 44.25 mph (71.21 km/h). Despite the vehicle's long wheelbase (19 ft 6 in (5.94 m)), and the frequent curves on the route, Livesay did not report any serious problems with ride quality. On the return trip, with a load of 360 tons gross, he recorded a peak of 68 mph on a 1 in 100 down section, with an average speed of 38 mph including several stops and speed restrictions. Livesay reported favourably on the acceleration of the train, recording 50 mph reached from standstill over 1.25 miles, with 60 mph reached in under 2 miles. Further Edinburgh to Dundee and return runs were made in the afternoon with 355 and 450 ton gross loads, recording average speeds of 40.25 and 33 mph respectively.

Cecil J. Allen reported travelling behind No. 2002 ‘’Earl Marischal’’ on a seventeen-coach train of 545 tons tare and 580 tons full from King's Cross to Scotland. The locomotive passed Finsbury Park without slipping and reached Peterborough, Grantham, Doncaster, York, Darlington, Newcastle, Edinburgh, Dundee and Aberdeen all ahead of schedule.

=== Rebuilding ===
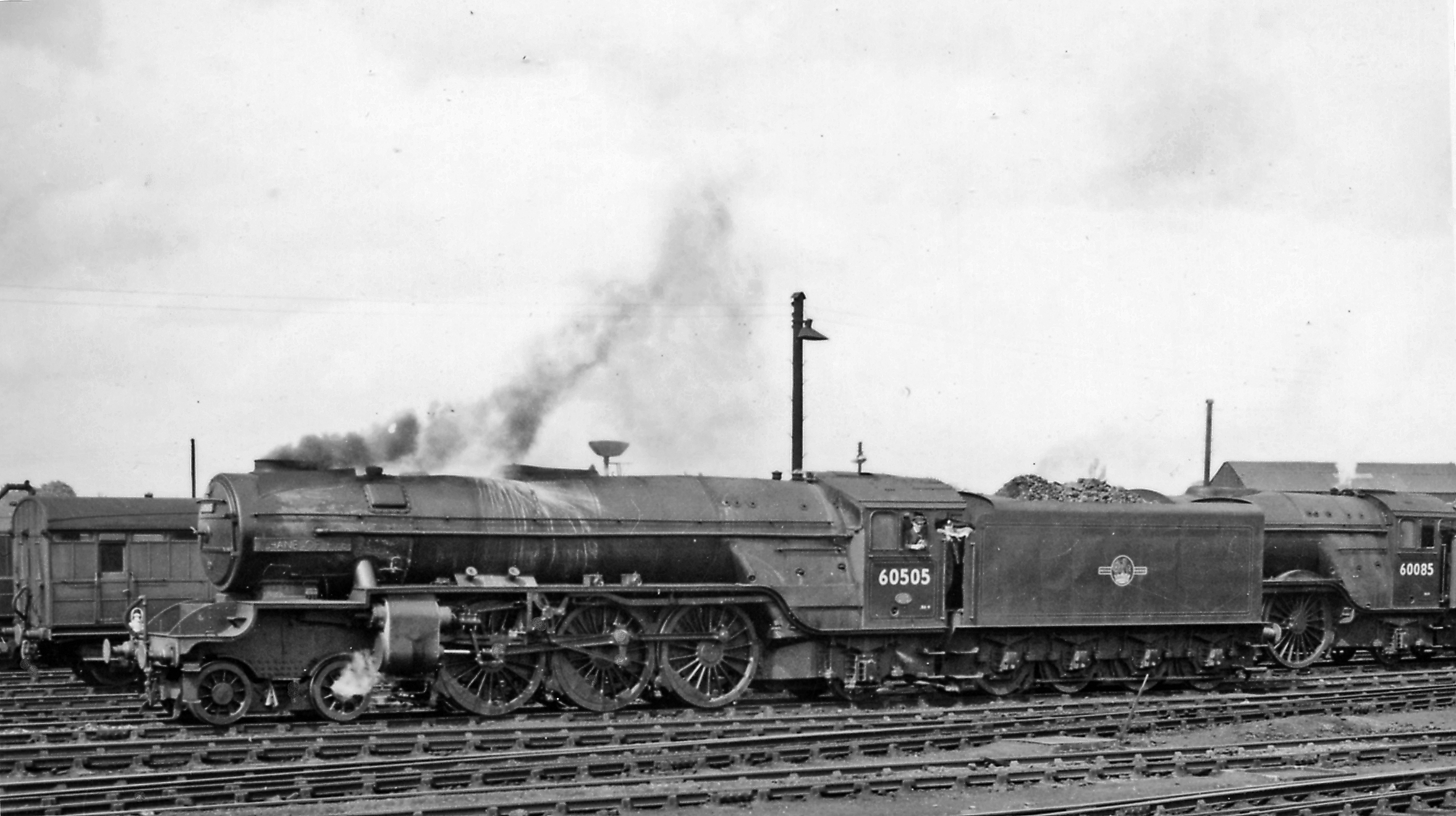
The former P2 2005 Thane of Fife, converted to an A2/2 Pacific, with the BR number 60505 in 1958.

The P2s were rebuilt into Class A2/2 4-6-2 'Pacifics' during 1943/4, starting with No. 2005 Thane of Fife. This was because they suffered from a range of issues in service, from high fuel consumption, to serious crank axle failures.

According to Bert Spencer, a senior LNER engineer, the class was rebuilt due to reliability problems during the difficult conditions of the World War II period, and additionally to take the opportunity to try out a different valve gear arrangement.

Other sources supposed that the rebuilding might be because the class's wheelbase was too long for the routes it worked, and that the railway would have been better served if the class had been transferred to more suitable routes. Cecil J. Allen supported such a view, believing the engines would have been welcomed on services between King's Cross and Newcastle. Oliver Bulleid was quoted that the class had been placed into services in which they were under-utilised or misused, leading to poor fuel economy.

Railway author O. S. Nock suggested that Gresley's successor, Edward Thompson, may have made largely unsubstantiated criticisms of the class in order to justify the rebuilding.

=== Locomotives ===
| Number | Name | Build Date | Rebuild Date | Additional Notes |
|---|---|---|---|---|
| 2001 | Cock o' the North | May 1934 | September 1944 | Streamlined 1938 |
| 2002 | Earl Marischal | October 1934 | June 1944 | Streamlined 1936 |
| 2003 | Lord President | June 1936 | December 1944 | Built as streamlined |
| 2004 | Mons Meg | July 1936 | November 1944 | Built as streamlined |
| 2005 | Thane of Fife | August 1936 | January 1943 | Built as streamlined |
| 2006 | Wolf of Badenoch | September 1936 | May 1944 | Built as streamlined |

== New build P2 proposals ==
No original members of the class were preserved, as all were rebuilt into LNER A2/2 Pacifics by 1944, and subsequently scrapped. However, two new engines are now being built: one by the P2 Steam Locomotive Company in the original shape (LNER P2 Class 2007 Prince of Wales), to be numbered 2007 as a new member of the class; and the other by the Doncaster P2 Locomotive Trust as a replica of No. 2001 "Cock o' the North" in streamlined condition.

=== The P2 Steam Locomotive Company ===
In 2010 the A1 Steam Locomotive Trust, who were responsible for the construction of 60163 Tornado, announced plans to hold a feasibility study into building a new P2 class locomotive, which would be numbered as 2007 and named "Prince of Wales".

In the September of 2011, the Trust approved the commencement of a feasibility study, which was divided into three stages.

The first stage involved creating an electronic model of the engine for track dynamic analysis. Tornado was used as the basis for this modelling, together with track position data supplied by Network Rail. Tornado had been fitted with accelerometers during its testing and the data from these were used to validate the modelling data and assumptions. The second and third stages created a computer model of a P2, and then analysed modifications to the design using the computer software. Modelling data for the P2 design and a modified design with a LNER Class V2 type pony truck was published in early 2013. The rail-dynamics software used was Resonate Group's 'VAMPIRE' product. The computer modelling showed acceptable dynamics and the project to build No. 2007 was officially launched in September 2013 at the A1 Convention with a seven-to-ten-year construction timetable.

The locomotive is said to share 70% commonality of parts with Tornado, including the boiler and tender. Modern modifications to the original design include roller bearings (also featured on Tornado) and an all-welded, all-steel boiler. In most other respects and appearance, the loco, to be numbered 2007, will match that of the original No. 2001 Cock o' the North prior to streamlining.

On 14 November 2013 the P2 Steam Locomotive Company (P2SLC) announced that the name of its new P2 would be Prince of Wales, in honour of the 65th birthday of Charles, Prince of Wales. Construction began in May 2014 with the locomotive's frames being cut at Tata Steel's Scunthorpe works.

The project cost is estimated at £5,000,000.

=== Doncaster P2 Locomotive Trust ===
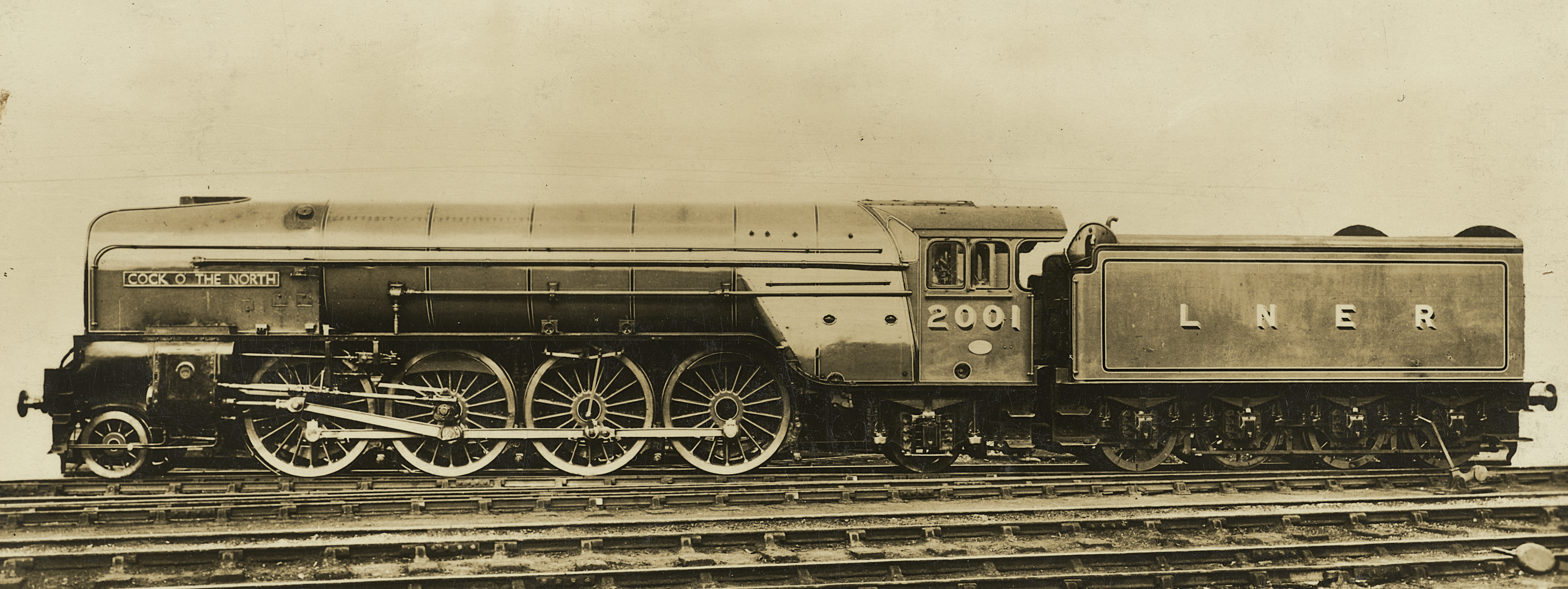
LNER P2 No. 2001, Cock O' The North, side view

The Doncaster P2 Locomotive Trust (Registered Charity No. 1149835) plans to build a working replica of the prototype No. 2001 Cock O' The North as modified in 1938, using Gresley motion, Walschaerts valve gear, and an A4 style 'Bugatti' streamlined front. The locomotive's frames were cut in April 2014 at Tata Steel's Wednesfield works.

== Modelling ==
From 1935 to 1937, Märklin built P2 No. 2001 Cock O' The North and No. 2002 Earl Marischal in a black fantasy paint scheme. The catalogue number of the O gauge tinplate three-rail steam locomotive was L70/12920.

In 2013, Hornby Railways collaborated with the A1 Locomotive Trust to produce models of the class, starting with the original Cock O' The North, for release in early 2014. It was made available in both a low-level "Hornby Railroad" specification, and a more detailed version including a third level of the model with Hornby Railways' new Twin Track Sound (TTS). They are also currently in development of a model version of Prince of Wales, as documented on an episode of UKTV's "Hornby: A Model World".
