= GCR Class 8C =

Class of British steam locomotives

GCR Class 8C LNER B1 (later B18)
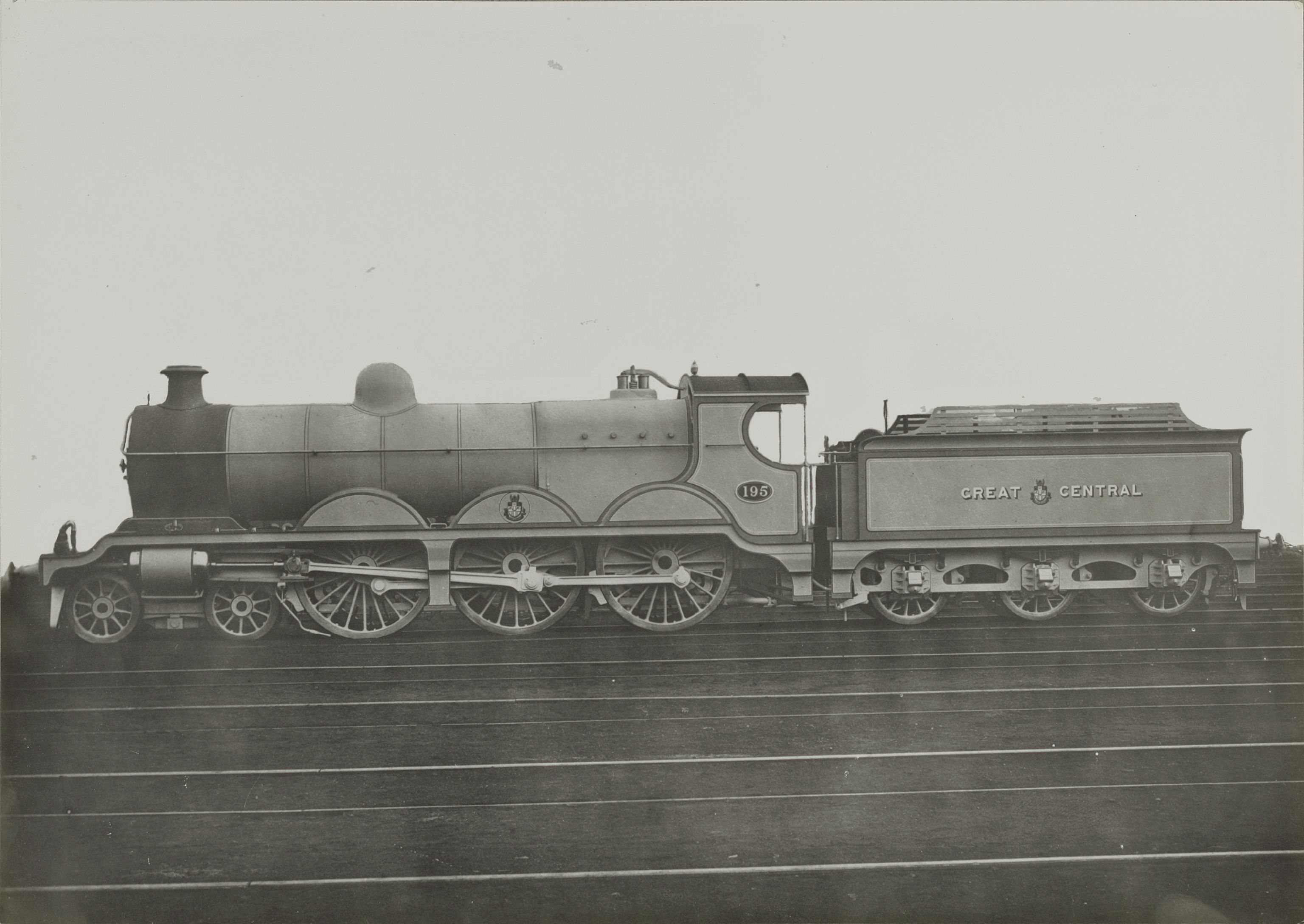
Type and origin
- Power type: Steam
- Designer: John G. Robinson
- Builder: Beyer, Peacock and Company
- Order number: BP: 9035
- Serial number: 4521–4522
- Build date: December 1903 – January 1904
- Total produced: 2
Specifications
- Configuration
  - Whyte: 4-6-0
  - UIC: 2′C n2
- Gauge: 4 ft 8 1/2 in (1,435 mm)
- Leading dia.: 3 ft 6 in (1.067 m)
- Driver dia.: 6 ft 9 in (2.057 m)
- Axle load: 18 long tons 10 cwt (41,400 lb or 18.8 t)
- Adhesive weight: 55 long tons 4 cwt (123,600 lb or 56.1 t)
- Loco weight: 71 long tons 0 cwt (159,000 lb or 72.1 t)
- Tender weight: 48 long tons 6 cwt (108,200 lb or 49.1 t)
- Fuel type: Coal
- Fuel capacity: 6 long tons 0 cwt (13,400 lb or 6.1 t)
- Water cap.: 4,000 imp gal (18,000 L; 4,800 US gal)
- Boiler pressure: 180 lbf/in^{2} (1.24 MPa)
- Cylinders: Two, outside
- Cylinder size: see text
- Valve gear: Stephenson
- Valve type: Slide, later 10-inch (254 mm) piston valves
Career
- Operators: GCR; →LNER
- Class: GCR: 8C; LNER: B1 (B18 from April 1943)
- Numbers: GCR: 195–196; LNER: 5195–5196, later 1479–1480
- Axle load class: LNER: Route Availability: 5
- Withdrawn: December 1947
- Disposition: Both scrapped

The GCR Class 8C was a class of a pair of 4-6-0 locomotives built for the Great Central Railway in 1903–1904 by Beyer, Peacock and Company. They passed to the London and North Eastern Railway at the 1923 grouping and received the classification B1. Following the introduction of Thompson's B1s, they were reclassified B18 in 1943 and both were retired in 1947.

== Design ==
Two were built as a comparison with a two similar 4-4-2 locomotives (GCR Class 8B, later LNER class C4). The 4-4-2 locomotives were numbered 192 and 194, the 4-6-0s 195 and 196.

They were built with a saturated boiler, inside slide valves and Stephenson valve gear, two outside cylinders connected to 6-foot-9-inch (2.057 m) diameter driving wheels. No. 196 had 19-by-26-inch (483 mm × 660 mm) cylinders, while No. 195 has 19 1/2-by-26-inch (495 mm × 660 mm) cylinders.

While the 4-4-2 locomotive design was chosen as the superior design, and was repeated in quantity, the basic 8C design was sound and used as the basis of the Class 8F (later LNER Class B4), the main difference being smaller driving wheels of 6 ft 6 in (1.981 m) diameter.

== Modifications ==
One (No. 195) had been fitted with a superheated boiler, 10-inch piston valves and 21-inch cylinders in 1912, but the boiler had been exchanged for a saturated one in 1920.

== LNER ownership ==
The two locomotives were renumbered by the LNER by adding 5000 to their GCR numbers; and classified as B1.

The LNER designed a new type of superheated boiler (Diagram 16) based on the old design (Diagram 15). These were used on the B1 and B4 class locomotives; no more of this type of boiler was made after 1932, and so to keep the B1 and B4s in service during World War II, some Diagram 15 boilers were modified for use with these locomotives.

5195 received a Diagram 16 boiler in March 1926; while 5196 received its new boiler and had its cylinder diameter increased to 21-inches in April 1927

Their classification was changed to B18 in April 1943 to allow Thompson's B class to be reclassified as B1. They were renumbered 1479 and 1480 in 1946. Withdrawal came in December 1947, and both were scrapped.
