= H&BR Class F1 =

Class of British 0-6-2T steam locomotives

H&BR Class F1 LNER Class N11
Type and origin
- Power type: Steam
- Designer: Kitson & Co.
- Builder: Kitson & Co.
- Build date: 1901
- Total produced: 5
Specifications
- Configuration
  - Whyte: 0-6-2T
- Gauge: 4 ft 8 1/2 in (1,435 mm)
- Driver dia.: 4 ft 9 in (1.45 m)
- Loco weight: 58.2 long tons (59.1 t)
- Fuel type: Coal
- Fuel capacity: 2.5 long tons (2.5 t)
- Water cap.: 1,825 imp gal (8,300 L; 2,192 US gal)
- Firebox
  - Grate area: 21 sq ft (2.0 m^{2})
- Boiler pressure: 160 psi (1.1 MPa)
- Cylinders: Two, inside
- Cylinder size: 18 in × 26 in (460 mm × 660 mm)
Performance figures
- Tractive effort: 20,099 lbf (89.40 kN)
Career
- Withdrawn: 1943-1946
- Disposition: All scrapped

The H&BR Class F1 (LNER Class N11) was a class of 0-6-2T steam locomotives of the Hull and Barnsley Railway. The locomotives were part of a batch built by Kitson and Company for the Lancashire, Derbyshire and East Coast Railway (LD&ECR), but the order was cancelled because the LD&ECR was unable to pay for them.

== Equipment ==
The locomotives had domed boilers and square-topped cabs and were fitted with vacuum brakes.

== Use ==
They were used for banking, goods trains and passenger trains. When the H&BR Class A locomotives were introduced for coal trains, the F1s were displaced to shunting duties.

== Withdrawal ==
All were withdrawn and scrapped by the London and North Eastern Railway between 1943 and 1946. None have been preserved.
