= Matthew Stirling (railway engineer) =

British locomotive engineer

- Born: 27 November 1856; Kilmarnock, Scotland
- Died: 5 October 1931 (aged 74); Kingston upon Hull, England
- Citizenship: United Kingdom
- Parent: Patrick Stirling
- Engineering career
- Discipline: Locomotive engineer
- Employer: Hull & Barnsley Railway

Matthew Stirling (1856–1931) was Locomotive Superintendent of the Hull and Barnsley Railway (H&BR). Matthew Stirling was born in Kilmarnock on 27 November 1856. He was the son of Patrick Stirling, the nephew of James Stirling, and grandson of Robert Stirling – all of whom were also famous mechanical engineers.

== Career ==
Matthew was appointed Locomotive Superintendent of the H&BR on 13 May 1885. His first locomotive design was the H&BR Class B 0-6-0 tender locomotive (1889). This later became LNER Class J23. A larger and more modern version of the Class B was developed later. This was designated H&BR Class L, and later became LNER Class J28. Matthew Stirling's locomotive designs often incorporated the design traditions established by his father, including domeless boilers and wrap over cabs. His powerful H&BR Class A (LNER Class Q10) 0-8-0 freight locomotives were heavily used during World War I.

List of locomotive designs

H&BR class	LNER class	Wheels	Date
B	J23	0-6-0	1889
G2	J80	0-6-0T	1892
F2	N12	0-6-2T	1901
G3	J75	0-6-0T	1901
A	Q10	0-8-0	1907
J	D24	4-4-0	1910
L	J28	0-6-0	1911
F3	N13	0-6-2T	1913

The LNER Class N13s survived into the British Railways era and the last locomotive, No. 69114, was withdrawn in 1956.

== Retirement and death ==
He retired in 1922 when the H&BR was taken over by the North Eastern Railway (NER). Stirling died on 5 October 1931 in Hull, aged 74.
