= H&BR Class A =

Class of British steam locomotives

H&BR Class A LNER Class Q10
Type and origin
- Power type: Steam
- Designer: Matthew Stirling
- Builder: Yorkshire Engine Company
- Build date: 1907
- Total produced: 15
Specifications
- Configuration
  - Whyte: 0-8-0
- Gauge: 4 ft 8 1/2 in (1,435 mm)
- Driver dia.: 4 ft 6 in (1.37 m)
- Loco weight: 61.55 long tons (62.54 t)
- Tender weight: 39.4 long tons (40.0 t)
- Fuel type: coal
- Boiler pressure: 175 psi (1.21 MPa) [originally 200 psi (1.4 MPa)]
- Cylinders: two inside
- Cylinder size: 19 in × 26 in (480 mm × 660 mm)
Performance figures
- Tractive effort: 25,860 lbf (115.0 kN)
Career
- Withdrawn: 1931

The H&BR Class A (later LNER Class Q10) was an 0-8-0 heavy freight engine designed by Matthew Stirling and built by the Yorkshire Engine Company of Sheffield. They were the largest of the engines on the Hull and Barnsley Railway. The Class A was developed to deal with the steeply graded eastern section of the H&BR between Springhead and Sandholme. Because of this the special link workings they dealt with were nicknamed the "Sandholme Bankers".

== Construction ==
An order for 15 locomotives was placed with the Yorkshire Engine Company in 1907 with 10 arriving in the spring and the remainder in the autumn of that year. No. 117 was the first to arrive, this engine being the one used to familiarise footplate staff with them. Due to their size they were affectionately nicknamed "Tinies" by the footplate men.

== Operation ==
The locos were set to work being able to pull 50% more than the previous capabilities of the early Stirling Classes. Though they were cleared for running on the whole of the H&B mainline, they never strayed from Springhead Shed and were banned from the Denaby, Neptune Street, Cannon Street and Sculcoates lines. Despite being reasonable locomotives they were regarded with suspicion due to their high boiler pressures following the Wath explosion, so the H&B management increased payment for crews who manned the "Tinies". The Wath explosion, in 1907, involved H&BR Class F2 0-6-2T number 109.

== Modifications ==
Various modifications were made to the "Tinies" over their lives. Sanding arrangements were altered to improve the adhesion of the engines, and one engine, No. 129, received a small porthole window in the cabside. All engines received a cab roof ventilator. During the First World War, the boiler pressure was dropped from 200 lb/sq.in to 175 lb/sq.in. No other modifications were made until the merger with the North Eastern Railway.

== LNER ownership ==
Under new management, some "Tinies" were sent to Darlington Works where they received domed boilers. All members of the class passed into LNER ownership, though by the grouping more powerful ex-Great Central Railway types were available. Cudworth shed soon became swarmed with ROD 2-8-0s, and 12 of the "Tinies" were away from their home system by 1929.

== Withdrawal ==
The "Tinies" never found favour with other depot footplate staff, and all were withdrawn by the end of 1931. None were preserved.
