= H&BR Class F3 =

Class of British steam locomotives

H&BR Class F3 LNER Class N13
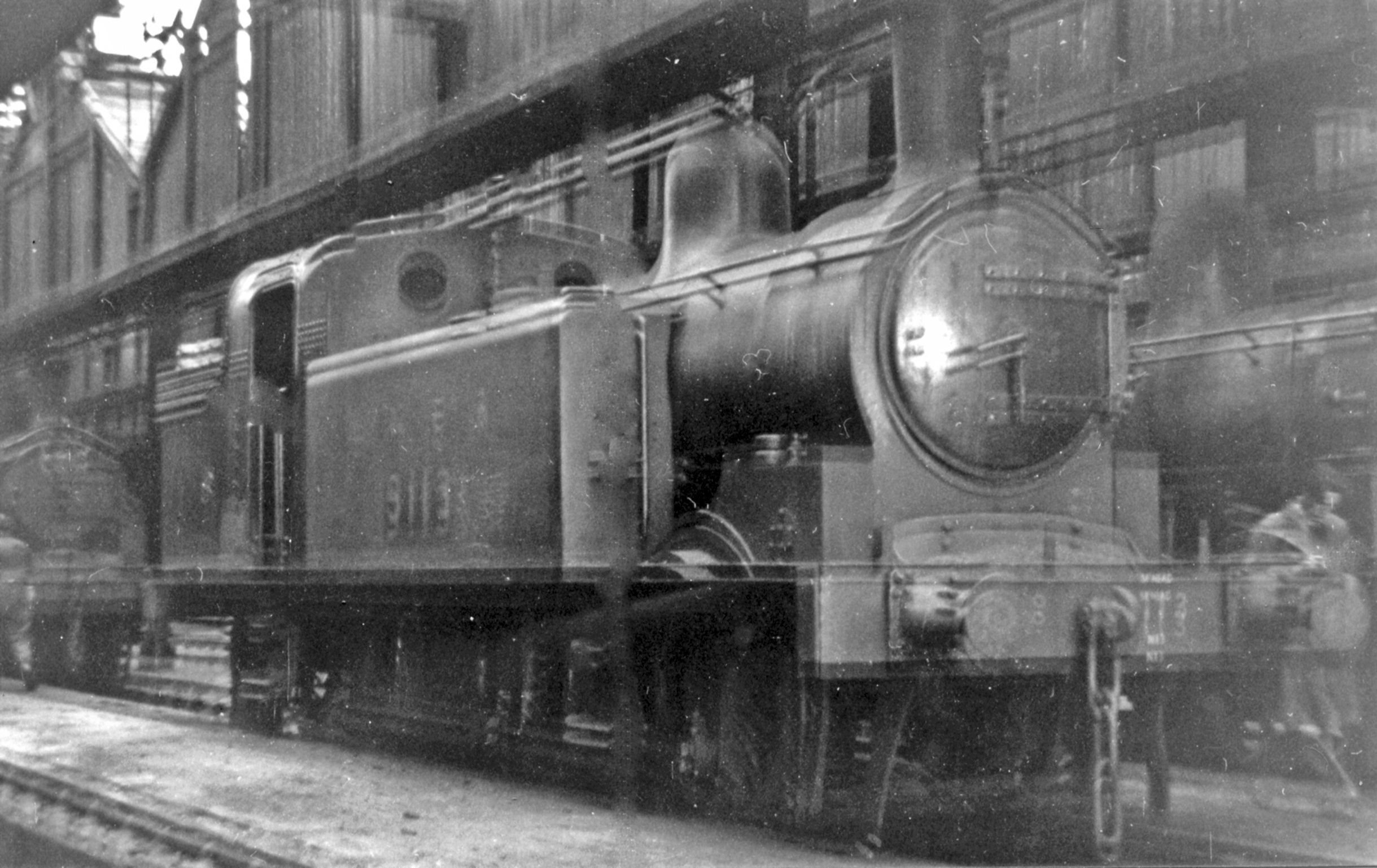
Type and origin
- Power type: Steam
- Designer: Matthew Stirling
- Builder: Hawthorn Leslie and Company
- Build date: 1913-1914
- Total produced: 10
Specifications
- Configuration
  - Whyte: 0-6-2T
- Gauge: 4 ft 8 1/2 in (1,435 mm)
- Driver dia.: 4 ft 6 in (1.37 m)
- Loco weight: 61.45 long tons (62.44 t)
- Fuel type: coal
- Fuel capacity: 3 long tons (3.0 t)
- Water cap.: 2,000 imp gal (9,100 L; 2,400 US gal)
- Firebox
  - Grate area: 16 1/4 sq ft (1.51 m^{2})
- Boiler pressure: 175 psi (1.21 MPa)
- Cylinders: two inside
- Cylinder size: 18 in × 26 in (460 mm × 660 mm)
Performance figures
- Tractive effort: 23,205 lbf (103.22 kN)
Career
- Scrapped: 1952-1956

The H&BR Class F3 (LNER Class N13) was a class of 0-6-2T steam locomotives of the Hull and Barnsley Railway. They were designed by Matthew Stirling to work goods trains to and from the King George Dock at Hull which opened in 1914. They were not fitted with vacuum brakes so they were not suitable for passenger work.

== Dimensions ==
Sources disagree about some dimensions. LNER encyclopedia gives boiler pressure as 160 psi and tractive effort as 21,216 lbf (94,370 N). Ian Allan gives 175 psi and 23,205 lbf (103,220 N) respectively. The locomotives were fitted with new boilers between 1926 and 1934 so it is possible that the boiler pressure was raised at this time.

== British Railways ==
All 10 locomotives survived into British Railways ownership in 1948, but one was scrapped immediately and did not receive a BR number. The remaining 9 were given BR numbers 69111-69119.

== Withdrawal ==
The N13s were withdrawn between 1952 and 1956. The last N13 to be withdrawn was number 69114 and it was the last H&BR locomotive to remain in service. None are preserved.
