= H&BR Class F2 =

Class of British steam locomotives

H&BR Class F2 LNER Class N12
Type and origin
- Power type: Steam
- Designer: Matthew Stirling
- Builder: Kitson & Co.
- Build date: 1901
- Total produced: 9
Specifications
- Configuration
  - Whyte: 0-6-2T
- Gauge: 4 ft 8 1/2 in (1,435 mm)
- Driver dia.: 4 ft 6 in (1.37 m)
- Loco weight: 58 long tons (59 t)
- Fuel type: coal
- Fuel capacity: 3 long tons (3.0 t)
- Water cap.: 1,558 imp gal (7,080 L; 1,871 US gal)
- Firebox
  - Grate area: 16 1/4 sq ft (1.51 m^{2})
- Boiler pressure: 160 psi (1.1 MPa)
- Cylinders: two inside
- Cylinder size: 18 in × 26 in (460 mm × 660 mm)
Performance figures
- Tractive effort: 21,216 lbf (94.37 kN)
Career
- Withdrawn: 1936-1938, 1948

The H&BR Class F2 (LNER Class N12) was a class of 0-6-2T steam locomotives of the Hull and Barnsley Railway, designed by Matthew Stirling. Nine locomotives were built by Kitson & Co. in 1901.

== Equipment ==
The locomotives had domeless boilers and rounded cabs and were fitted with vacuum brakes. After the Grouping in 1923, they were rebuilt with a variety of boilers, some domed and some domeless.

== Use ==
They were used for goods trains, banking, assembling mineral trains in colliery sidings and occasionally for passenger work.

== Withdrawal ==
All but one were withdrawn between 1936 and 1938. The survivor passed to British Railways in 1948. It was allocated the BR number 69089, but never carried it, and was scrapped in August 1948. None of the class is preserved.
