= Kitson and Company =

British locomotive manufacturer, 1835–1945

Kitson and Company was a locomotive manufacturer based in Hunslet, Leeds, West Yorkshire, England.

== Early history ==
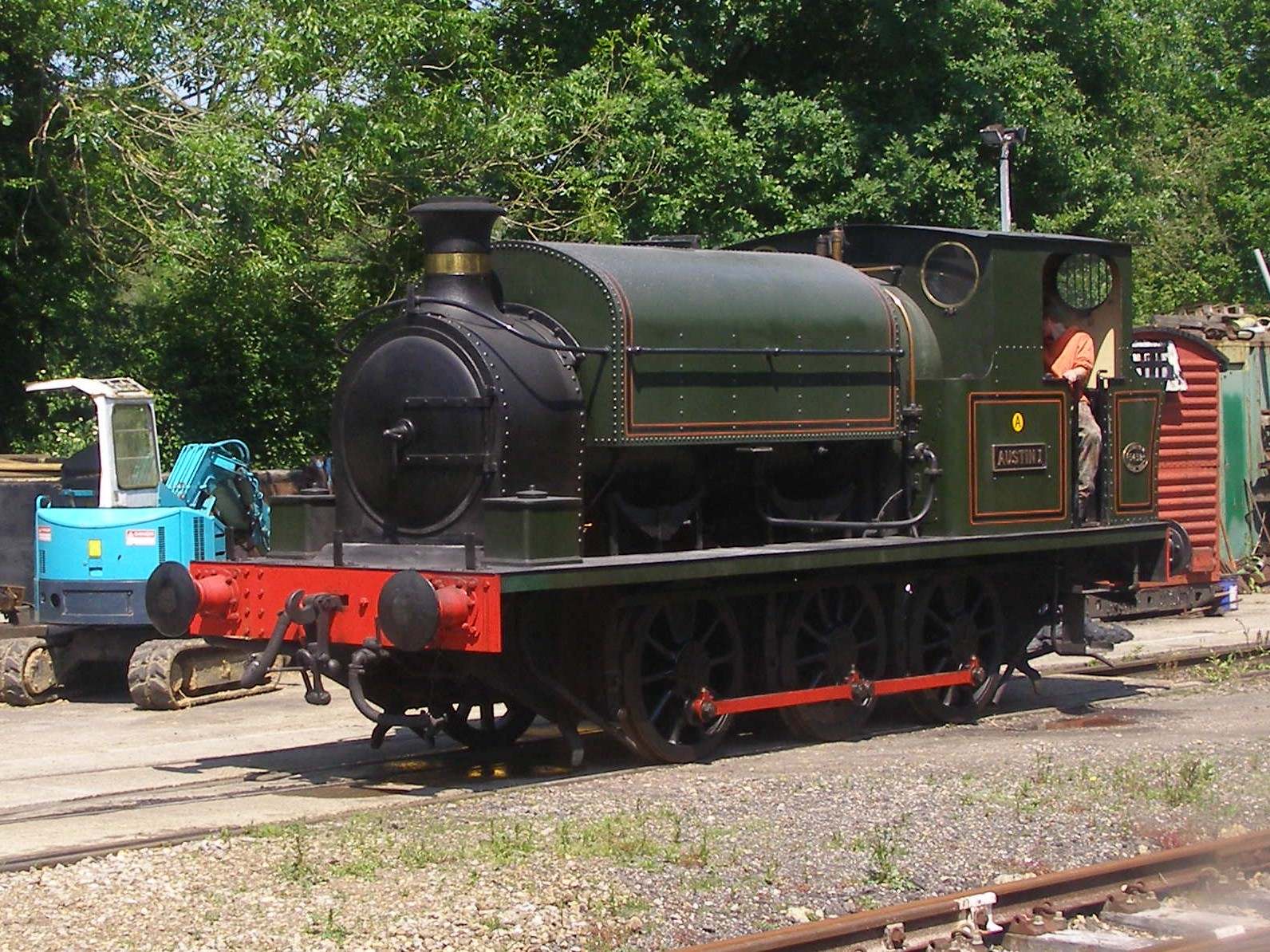
Kitson 0-6-0 "Austin I" built in 1932

The company was started in 1835 by James Kitson at the Airedale Foundry, off Pearson Street, Hunslet, with Charles Todd as a partner. Todd had been apprenticed to Matthew Murray at the Round Foundry in Holbeck, Leeds.

Initially, the firm made parts for other builders, until it was joined in 1838 by David Laird, a wealthy farmer who was looking for investments, and the company became Todd, Kitson and Laird. That year saw the production of the company's first complete locomotives, either for the North Midland or the Liverpool and Manchester Railway. However, Todd left almost immediately to form Shepherd and Todd, and the company was known variously as Kitson and Laird or Laird and Kitson.

The order for six engines by the Liverpool and Manchester began with 0-4-2 Lion, which still exists. Around 1858, it was withdrawn from service and sold to the Mersey Docks and Harbour Board, where it was jacked-up off its wheels and used for pumping water. In 1930, it was restored and remains in preservation at the Museum of Liverpool.

In 1842, Laird, who not receiving the financial return he expected, left the partnership. Kitson was then joined by Isaac Thompson and William Hewitson, the company becoming Kitson Thompson and Hewitson. In 1851, the company exhibited an early tank locomotive at The Great Exhibition, and was awarded a gold medal. In 1858, Thompson left and the firm became Kitson and Hewitson, then, finally, Kitson and Company in 1863 when Hewitson died.

The company built about 5,400 locomotives over a period of 101 years, with orders for British railways, including the Midland Railway, the Lancashire and Yorkshire Railway and the South Eastern Railway, and worldwide. From 1855 many Indian railways became major customers.

From 1866 Kitson's produced a large proportion of the Midland Railway double-framed goods engines designed by Matthew Kirtley and from 1869 began building a series of engines for Russia. At some time prior to 1884 the factory employed Charles Algernon Parsons OM KCB FRS (13 June 1854 – 11 February 1931) who was engaged in building rocket-powered torpedoes. After leaving Kitsons, the brilliant Parsons went on to invent the steam turbine and change the world forever. In 1886 Kitson's assisted its representative E. Jeffreys in the preparation of five designs for the Victorian Railways (Australia), each with standardised components which were interchangeable between the classes.

Manufacture of these locomotives was by Victorian colonial builders, except for two examples built at Kitson's Airedale Foundry, Leeds, and exhibited at the Melbourne Centennial Exhibition, held in the Royal Exhibition Building in Melbourne in 1888, for which the firm received the First Order of Merit in the English Court. The locomotives were a large 0-6-0 and a suburban 2-4-2T. The Kitson designs influenced the Victorian Railways for many years. Kitson built a large order of 4-6-0s for the Cordoba Railway in Argentina during 1889–91, which were among the earliest British examples of this type.

From 1876 to 1901 the firm also built over 300 steam tram engines and steam railmotor units, which were developed from a design by W. R.Rowan.

== Kitson-Meyer ==
An innovation was the articulated locomotive design proposed by Robert Stirling based on the Meyer locomotive, later known as the Kitson-Meyer. The first three were built in 1894 for the Anglo-Chilian Nitrate and Railway Company in Chile, with two in 1903 for Rhodesia and three in 1904 for Jamaica. Over 50 were built, some 2-8-8-0 and 2-8-8-2, the last being in 1935. There were also some 0-8-6-0s designed for rack railway working in the Andes, two examples of which survive in Chile, and one in Argentina.

== Later history and closure ==
Kitsons were busy during the First World War, but trade dropped off in the 1920s. The experimental Kitson-Still 2-6-2T steam diesel hybrid locomotive, combining steam power with internal combustion, was tested on the London and North Eastern Railway (LNER) between York and Hull. This hauled revenue-earning trains for the LNER, but Kitson's could not afford to develop it into a commercially viable form. The high research and development costs contributed to the demise of Kitson & Co.

In 1922, Kitsons built the six K class 2-8-4T locomotives for Palestine Railways to work the steep gradients between Lydda and Jerusalem.

Kitson's last large order in 1924 was for 12 London and North Eastern Railway Improved Director class locomotives. In 1934, the receivers were called in and the company struggled on under receivership until 1937. In 1937, the firm was restructured to bring it out of receivership. The downsized company ceased locomotive production in 1938. The patterns, drawings and goodwill of Kitson's locomotive building business were acquired by Robert Stephenson and Hawthorns. Kitsons continued to supply locomotive components until 1945 when the remaining business and works was sold to J&H McLaren & Co.

== Preservation ==
Some Kitson locomotives have been preserved, they are listed below

Steam

- Austin 1 – Preserved and running on the Somerset & Dorset Railway in Somerset, South-West England. Owned by Llangollen Railway Trust, last overhaul was completed March 2020.
- Kitson Tram No. 1 – Preserved at the Streetlife Museum of Transport, in Hull, East Riding of Yorkshire, England.
- Kitson Tram No. 2 – Preserved at the Ulster Folk and Transport Museum in Cultra, County Down, Northern Ireland.
- Kitson No. 3 – Preserved and currently stored at the Dorrigo Steam Railway, in New South Wales, Australia.
- Kitson No. 5 – Preserved and on static display on the North Tyneside Steam Railway in Tyne & Wear, North East England.
- Kitson Tram No. 7 – Preserved at the Tramway Historical Society in Ferrymead, Christchurch, New Zealand.
- Kitson No. 9 – Preserved and currently stored at the Richmond Vale Heritage Park, in New South Wales, Australia.
- Kitson No. 10 – Preserved and currently stored at the Richmond Vale Heritage Park, in New South Wales, Australia.
- Kitson No. 20N ('The Buck') – Preserved and currently on display at the Newcastle Museum, New South Wales, Australia.
- Kitson No. 21/23 – Preserved and currently on display at the Richmond Vale Railway Museum, New South Wales, Australia.
- Kitson No. 29 – Preserved and running on the North Yorkshire Moors Railway, in Northern England. Last overhaul completed July 2019.
- Kitson No. 44 Conway – Preserved and on static display at the Middleton Railway in Leeds, Northern England.
- Kitson No. 45 Colwyn – Preserved at Tysley.
- Kitson No. 47 Carnarvon – Preserved and awaiting an overhaul at the South Devon Railway in Devon, South West England.
- Kitson No. 1338 – Preserved and on static display at the Didcot Railway Centre in Oxfordshire.
- Kitson No. 3591 – Preserved and on static display at the Harris Promenade, San Fernando, Trinidad &, Tobago.
- Kitson N°4739 built in 1910 and delivered on 1911, 4-6-2T Loco Water Tank Pacific Ex VFRGS Ex Brazil Great Southern 42 is at open public space in Cruz Alta, Rio Grande do Sul as static display.

== Bibliography ==
- Lowe, J. W., (1989) British Steam Locomotive Builders, Guild Publishing
- Binns, Donald (2003) Kitson Meyer Articulated Locomotives Trackside Publications, Skipton, UK.
- Pease, John (2003) The History of J. & H. McLaren of Leeds: Steam & Diesel Engine Makers Landmark Collector's Library
