= 1948 Locomotive Exchange Trials =

British Railways design trials

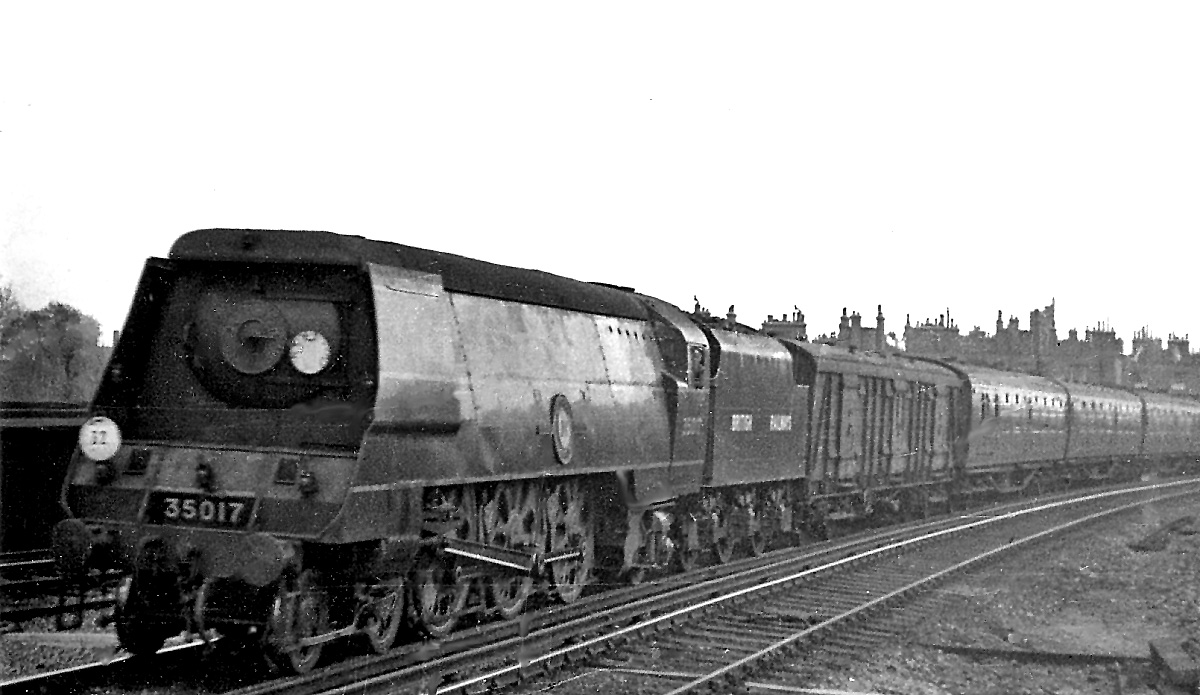
SR Merchant Navy class 35017 Belgian Marine with a Stanier tender participating in the trials

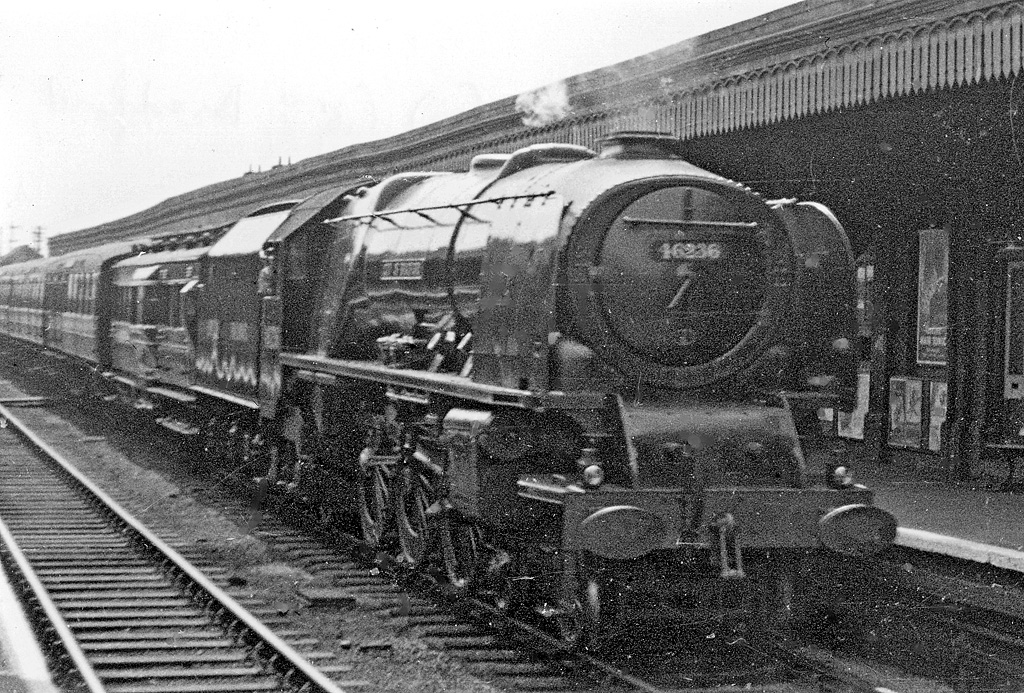
LMS Coronation Class 46236 City of Bradford with dynamometer car

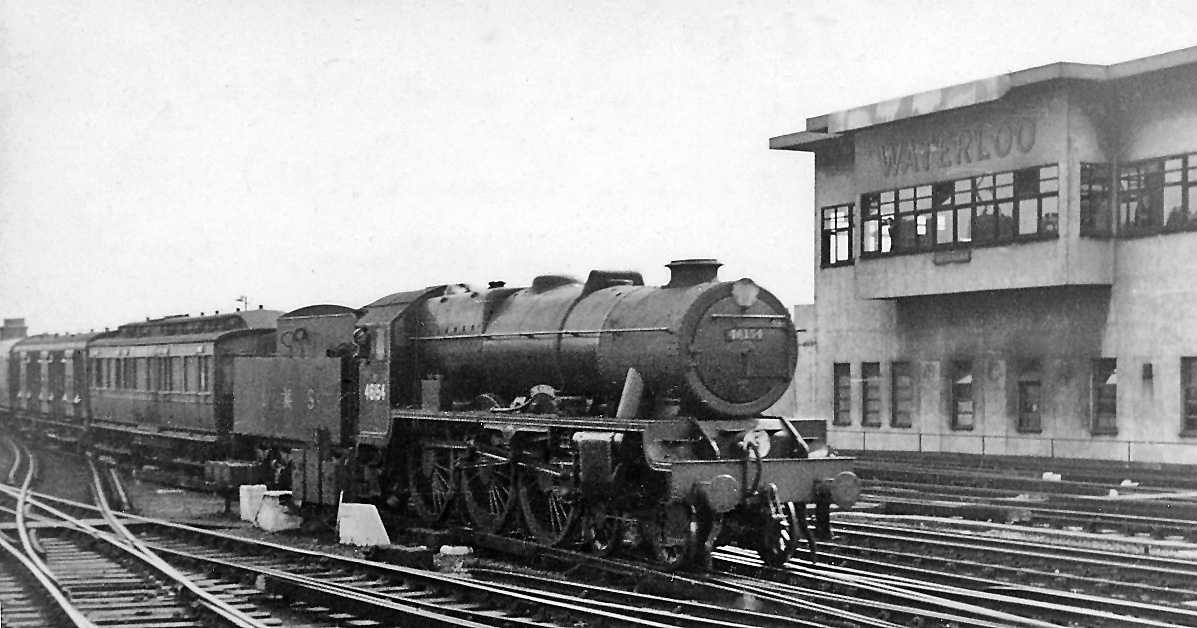
LMS Rebuilt Royal Scot Class No. 46154 The Hussar with a WD tender.

The 1948 Locomotive Exchange Trials were organised by the newly nationalised British Railways (BR). Locomotives from the former "Big Four" constituent companies (GWR, LMS, LNER, SR) were transferred to and worked on other regions. Officially, these comparisons were to identify the best qualities of the four different schools of thought of locomotive design so that they could be used in the planned BR standard designs. However, the testing had little scientific rigour, and political influence meant that LMS practice was largely followed by the new standard designs regardless. However, the trials were useful publicity for BR to show the unity of the new British Railways. To record the locomotive performances, one of three dynamometer cars were included in the train directly behind the locomotive (with a GWR, LMS and NER version being available).

LMS engines which operated over the Southern Region, where there were no water troughs, were paired with four-axled ex-WD tenders with larger water tanks. These were specially given LMS lettering for the occasion. Similarly, ex-Southern types used elsewhere were paired with ex-LMS tenders with water scoops.

The locomotives used are listed below. (The numbers given are the ones carried at the time, so this is a somewhat curious mixture of old pre-nationalisation numbers, prefixed numbers, and new BR numbers.)

== Express passenger locomotives ==
The four routes used were: LMS Euston to Carlisle, LNER Kings Cross to Leeds, GWR Paddington to Plymouth, and SR Waterloo to Exeter.

The only line with a loading gauge of sufficient size to take a GWR King was the LNER main line out of Kings Cross, meaning that the class was limited to that line only.

Official test runs on the LNER East Coast Main Line were held on the following dates, using the NER Dynamometer Car:

- 29 April, hauled by LMS Rebuilt Royal Scot Class 46162 Queens Westminster Rifleman in the down direction
- 30 April, hauled by LMS Rebuilt Royal Scot Class 46162 Queens Westminster Rifleman in the up direction
- 6 May, hauled by LMS Coronation Class 46236 City of Bradford in the down direction
- 7 May, hauled by LMS Coronation Class 46236 City of Bradford in the up direction
- 20 May, hauled by GWR King Class 6018 King Henry VI in the down direction
- 21 May, hauled by GWR King Class 6018 King Henry VI in the up direction
- 27 May, hauled by SR Merchant Navy Class 35017 Belgian Marine in the down direction
- 28 May, hauled by SR Merchant Navy Class 35017 Belgian Marine in the up direction
- 29 May, hauled by LMS Rebuilt Royal Scot Class 46162 Queens Westminster Rifleman in the down direction

Official test runs on the LMS West Coast Main Line were held on the following dates, using the L&YR Dynamometer Car whilst hauling the Royal Scot:

- 22 April, hauled by LMS Coronation Class 46236 City of Bradford in the down direction
- 23 April, hauled by LMS Coronation Class 46236 City of Bradford in the up direction
- 13 May, hauled by SR Merchant Navy Class 35017 Belgian Marine in the down direction
- 14 May, hauled by SR Merchant Navy Class 35017 Belgian Marine in the up direction
- 27 May, hauled by LNER Class A4 60034 Lord Faringdon in the down direction
- 28 May, hauled by LNER Class A4 60034 Lord Faringdon in the up direction

Official test runs on the SR West of England Main Line were held on the following dates, using the GWR Dynamometer Car whilst hauling the Atlantic Coast Express:

- 3 June, hauled by SR Merchant Navy Class 35018 British India Line in the down direction
- 4 June, hauled by SR Merchant Navy Class 35018 British India Line in the up direction
- 8 June, hauled by LNER Class A4 E22 Mallard in the down direction (loco declared failure at Exeter)
- 10 June, hauled by LNER Class A4 60033 Seagull in the down direction
- 11 June, hauled by LNER Class A4 60033 Seagull in the up direction
- 17 June, hauled by LMS Rebuilt Royal Scot Class 46154 The Hussar in the down direction
- 18 June, hauled by LMS Rebuilt Royal Scot Class 46154 The Hussar in the up direction
- 24 June, hauled by LMS Coronation Class 46236 City of Bradford in the down direction
- 25 June, hauled by LMS Coronation Class 46236 City of Bradford in the up direction

Official test runs on the GWR Main Line were held on the following dates, using the GWR Dynamometer Car:

- 27 April, hauled by SR Merchant Navy Class 35019 French Line C.G.T in the down direction
- 28 April, hauled by SR Merchant Navy Class 35019 French Line C.G.T in the up direction
- 4 May, hauled by LNER Class A4 60033 Seagull in the down direction
- 5 May, hauled by LNER Class A4 60033 Seagull in the up direction
- 18 May, hauled by LMS Coronation Class 46236 City of Bradford in the down direction
- 19 May, hauled by LMS Coronation Class 46236 City of Bradford in the up direction
- 25 May, hauled by LMS Rebuilt Royal Scot Class 46162 Queens Westminster Rifleman in the down direction
- 26 May, hauled by LMS Rebuilt Royal Scot Class 46162 Queens Westminster Rifleman in the up direction

== Mixed Traffic locomotives ==
The four routes used were: Midland Main Line St. Pancras to Manchester, Great Central Main Line Marylebone to Manchester, Highland Main Line Perth to Inverness, and South Devon Main Line Bristol to Plymouth.

Official test runs on the South Devon Main Line were held on the following dates, using the GWR Dynamometer Car:

- 7 July, hauled by LNER Class B1 61251 Oliver Bury in the up direction
- 14 July, hauled by LMS Black Five 45253 in the up direction
- 21 July, hauled by SR West Country class 34006 Bude in the up direction

Official test runs on the Midland Main Line were held on the following dates, using the L&YR Dynamometer Car:

- 1 June, hauled by LMS Black Five 45253 in the down direction
- 4 June, hauled by LMS Black Five 45253 in the up direction
- 15 June, hauled by LNER Class B1 61251 Oliver Bury in the down direction
- 18 June, hauled by LNER Class B1 61251 Oliver Bury in the up direction
- 22 June, hauled by SR West Country class 34005 Barnstaple in the down direction
- 23 June, hauled by SR West Country class 34005 Barnstaple in the up direction

Official test runs on the Great Central Main Line were held on the following dates, using the NER Dynamometer Car:

- 8 June, hauled by SR West Country class 34006 Bude in the down direction
- 9 June, hauled by SR West Country class 34006 Bude in the up direction
- 15 June, hauled by LMS Black Five 45253 in the down direction
- 16 June, hauled by LMS Black Five 45253 in the up direction
- 24 June, hauled by GWR Modified Hall Class 6990 Witherslack Hall in the down direction
- 25 June, hauled by GWR Modified Hall Class 6990 Witherslack Hall in the up direction

Official test runs on the Highland Main Line were held on the following dates, using the NER Dynamometer Car:

- 13 July, hauled by SR West Country class 34004 Yeovil in the down direction
- 14 July, hauled by SR West Country class 34004 Yeovil in the up direction
- 14 July, hauled by LMS Black Five 44799 in the down direction (on scheduled service, 1155am ex-Perth)
- 20 July, hauled by LNER Class B1 61292 in the down direction
- 21 July, hauled by LNER Class B1 61292 in the up direction

== Freight locomotives ==
The four routes used were: London Midland Region Brent to Toton, Eastern Region Ferme Park (London) to New England (Peterborough), Western Region Acton (London) to Severn Tunnel Junction (South Wales), and Southern Region Bristol to Eastleigh. Due to the tests being held on non-public services, details are only available from the Official Report.

Eastern Region tests were carried out using the L&YR Dynamometer Car by:

- LNER Class O1 63773 on 27 July
- WD Austerity 2-10-0 73774 on 10 and 12 August
- LMS 8F class 48189 on 17 and 19 August
- GWR 2884 Class 3803 on 26 and 27 August
- LNER Class O7 63169 on 31 August and 2 September

Western Region tests were carried out using the NER Dynamometer Car by:

- LMS 8F class 48189 on 28 and 30 July
- GWR 2884 Class 3803 on 10 and 12 August
- WD Austerity 2-10-0 73774 on 20 August
- WD Austerity 2-8-0 77000 on 27 August
- LNER Class O1 63773 on 31 August and 1 September
- LNER Class O7 63169

Midland Region tests were carried out by:

- LMS 8F class 48189 on 29 June and 2 July
- WD Austerity 2-10-0 73774 on 14 and 16 July
- LNER Class O1 63789 on 21 and 23 July
- LNER Class O7 63169 on 8 and 10 September
- GWR 2884 Class 3803

Southern Region tests were carried out by:

- WD Austerity 2-8-0 77000 on 10 and 12 August
- WD Austerity 2-10-0 73774 on 24 August
- LMS 8F class 48189 on 31 August and 2 September
- LNER Class O7 63169
- GWR 2884 Class 3803
- LNER Class O1 63773
