= SJ G11 =

Steam locomotives

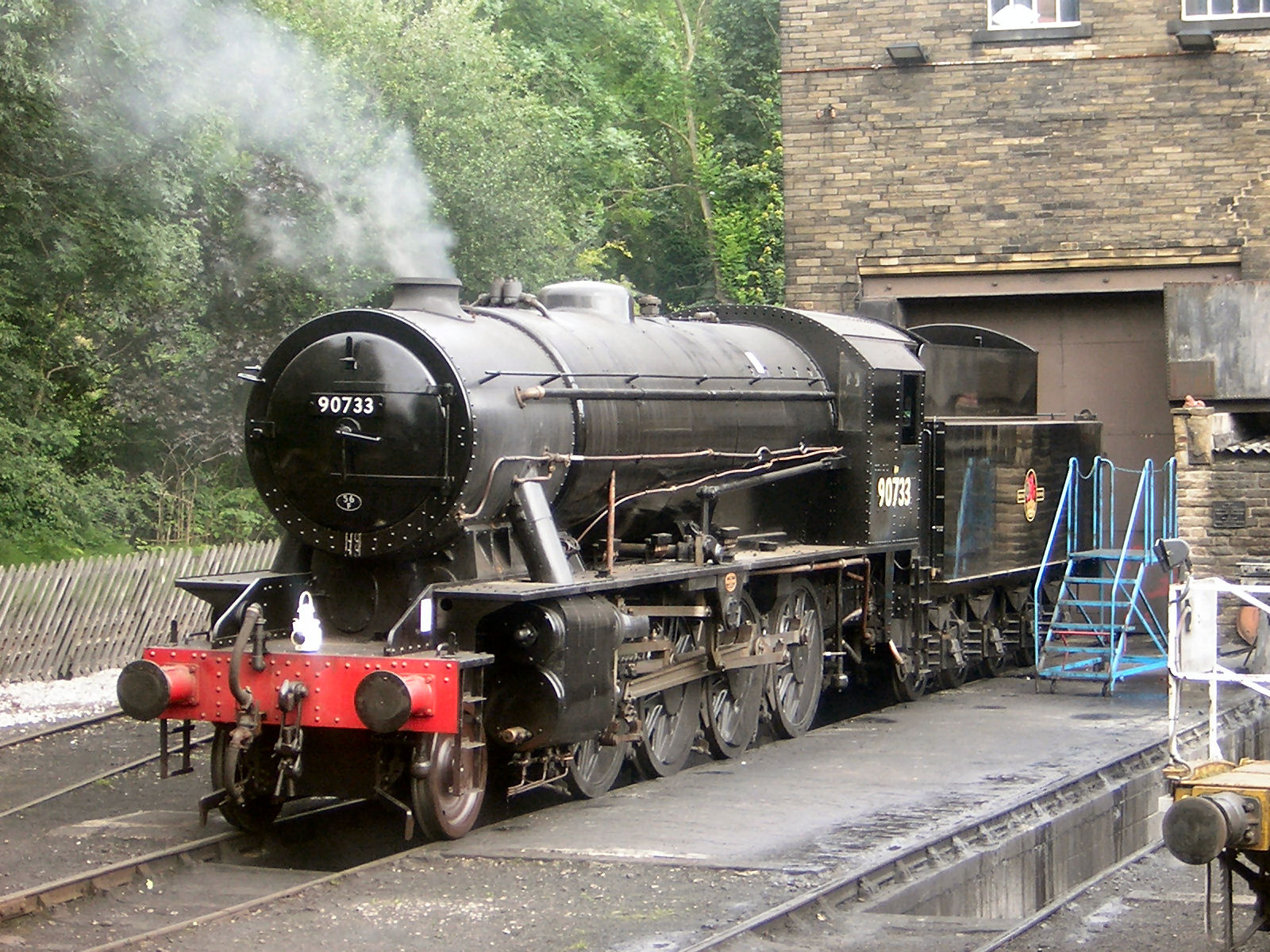
A preserved SJ G11 (No. 1931) locomotive on the Keighley and Worth Valley Railway in July 2007.

The Statens Järnvägar (SJ; Swedish State Railways) Class G11 was a class of two ex-British War Department Austerity 2-8-0 steam locomotives, numbered 1930 and 1931. They were both purchased in 1953 from Nederlandse Spoorwegen (NS; Dutch Railways).

SJ purchased these locomotives to evaluate if they could serve as at good replacement for the locomotives they had obtained through the nationalization of the private railways during the 1940s. It was possible to purchase these locomotives as surplus material quite cheaply. The trials were less than satisfactory though, and with the rapid advances in the technology of diesel locomotives, no further purchases of this type of locomotives were made by SJ.

== Overview ==
The two locomotives were numbered 1930 and 1931. Both had been transferred to Nederlandse Spoorwegen in 1945.

Numbers			Builder	Date built	Works No.	Notes
SJ	NS	WD	Builder	Date built	Works No.	Notes
1930	4383	78529	North British	1944	25428	
1931	4464	79257	Vulcan Foundry	1945	2500	Preserved

In Sweden the locomotives were altered. Their chimneys, the originals of which had been replaced with taller chimneys by the Dutch, were cut down. Their cabs were replaced with fully enclosed cabs. Their tenders were cut down from 8-wheel to 6-wheel, and so on.

The locomotives were primarily used in south-west Sweden on the Halmstad-Nässjö line.

Both were withdrawn in the 1960s and placed in the strategic reserve. No. 1931 was bought by a group from the Keighley and Worth Valley Railway in England and repatriated in 1973. There were negotiations for the Nene Valley Railway to purchase No. 1930, which would have been numbered as No. 90734 had it not been scrapped, but it was inadvertently scrapped, leaving No. 1931 as the only surviving WD Austerity 2-8-0. No. 1931 ran in a slightly modified conditions between 1973 and 1976. Locomotive 1931 finished its overhaul in 2007 which restored it to its original condition as "British Railways No. 90733", numbered 1 higher than the last of the BR ex-WD Austerity 2-8-0s.
