= WD Austerity 2-8-0 79257 =

Preserved British steam locomotive

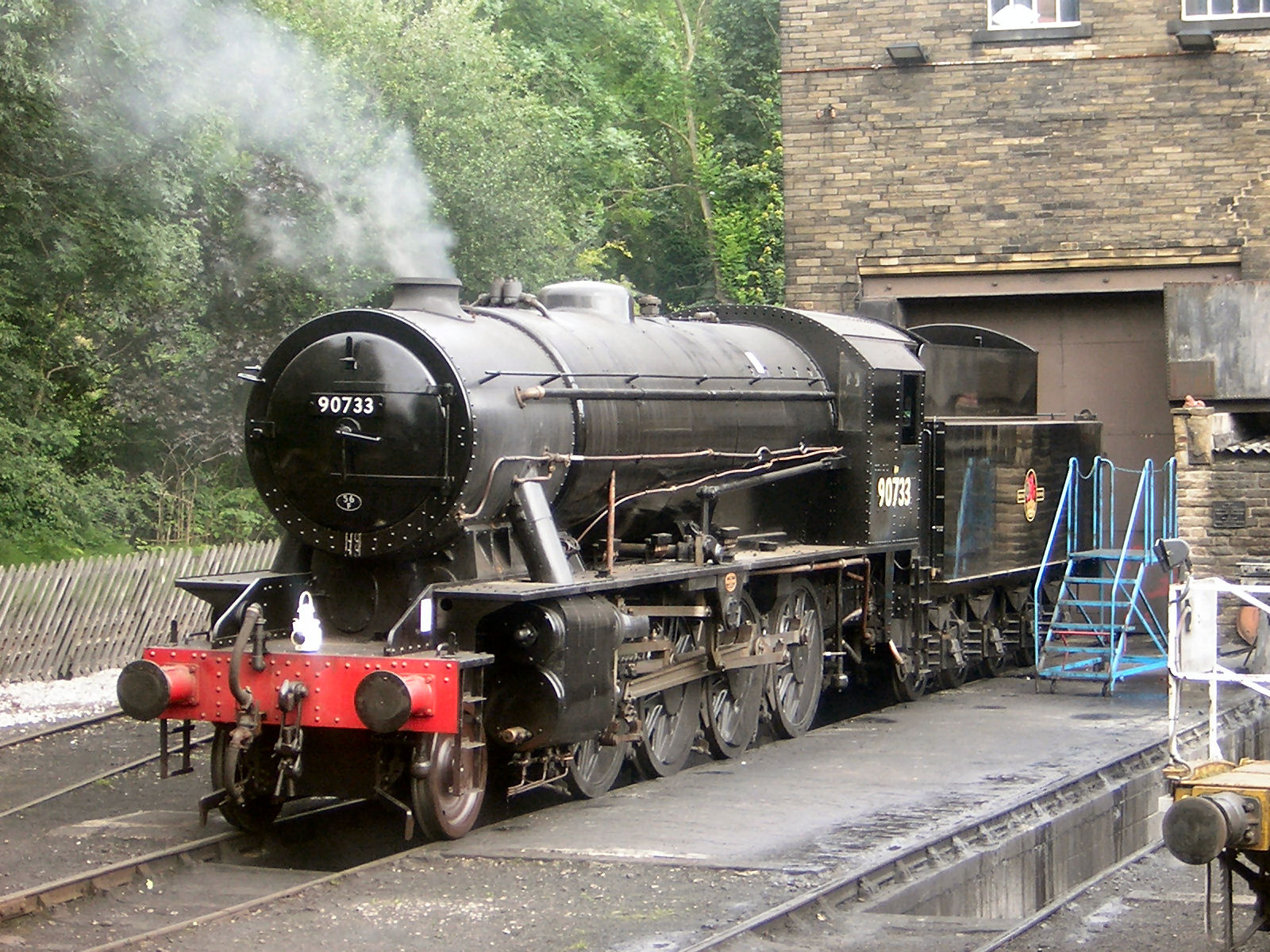
90733 as preserved at Haworth

War Department "Austerity" 2-8-0, WD No. 79257 is a preserved British steam locomotive. It is the only survivor of its type. Originally built by the Vulcan Foundry in 1945, works No. 5200, it was given the WD No. 79257. During the liberation of Europe, it was transferred to mainland Europe with the British Army.

== Post-war service ==
After the war, it was sold to Nederlandse Spoorwegen (NS, Dutch Railways), where it became part of the NS 4300 class number 4464. NS in turn sold it to Statens Järnvägar (SJ, Swedish State Railways) where it became Class G11 1931. Also sold to SJ at the same time was 4383 ex WD 78259 which became SJ 1930.

== Preservation ==
No. 1931 was preserved by the Keighley & Worth Valley Railway, who ran it in SJ condition for several years. In 1993 work began on restoring the locomotive to more or less original condition, as "British Railways No. 90733", one higher than the last BR ex-WD Austerity 2-8-0, 90732 Vulcan. Incidentally, one engine did very briefly carry the BR number 90733 as ex-WD Stanier Class 8F No. 48773 (also preserved) was incorrectly numbered that upon entering BR stock in 1957, after being mistaken for an Austerity 2-8-0 type. As of July 2018, it is being stripped for an overhaul.

== Gallery ==
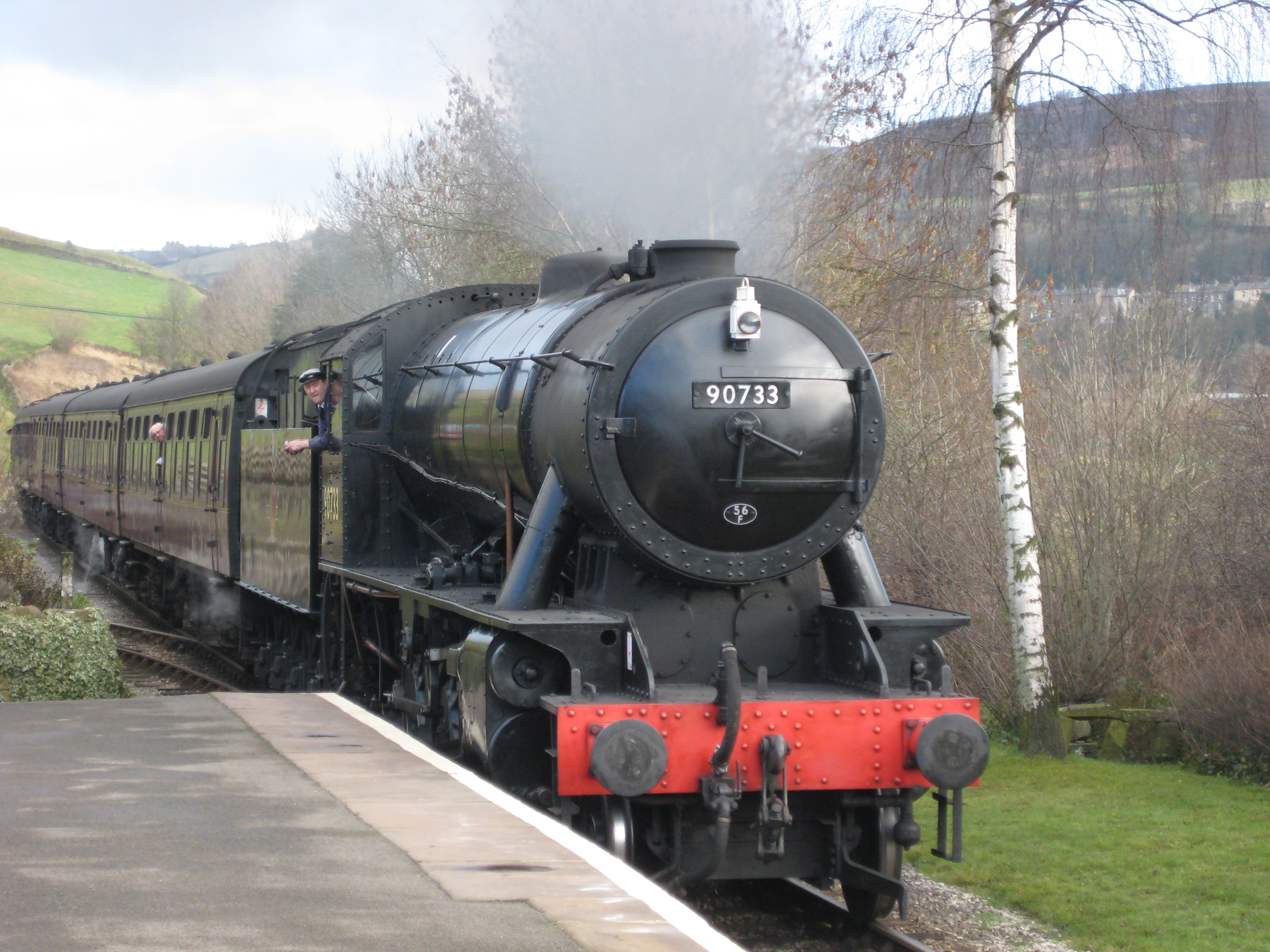
Approaching Oakworth

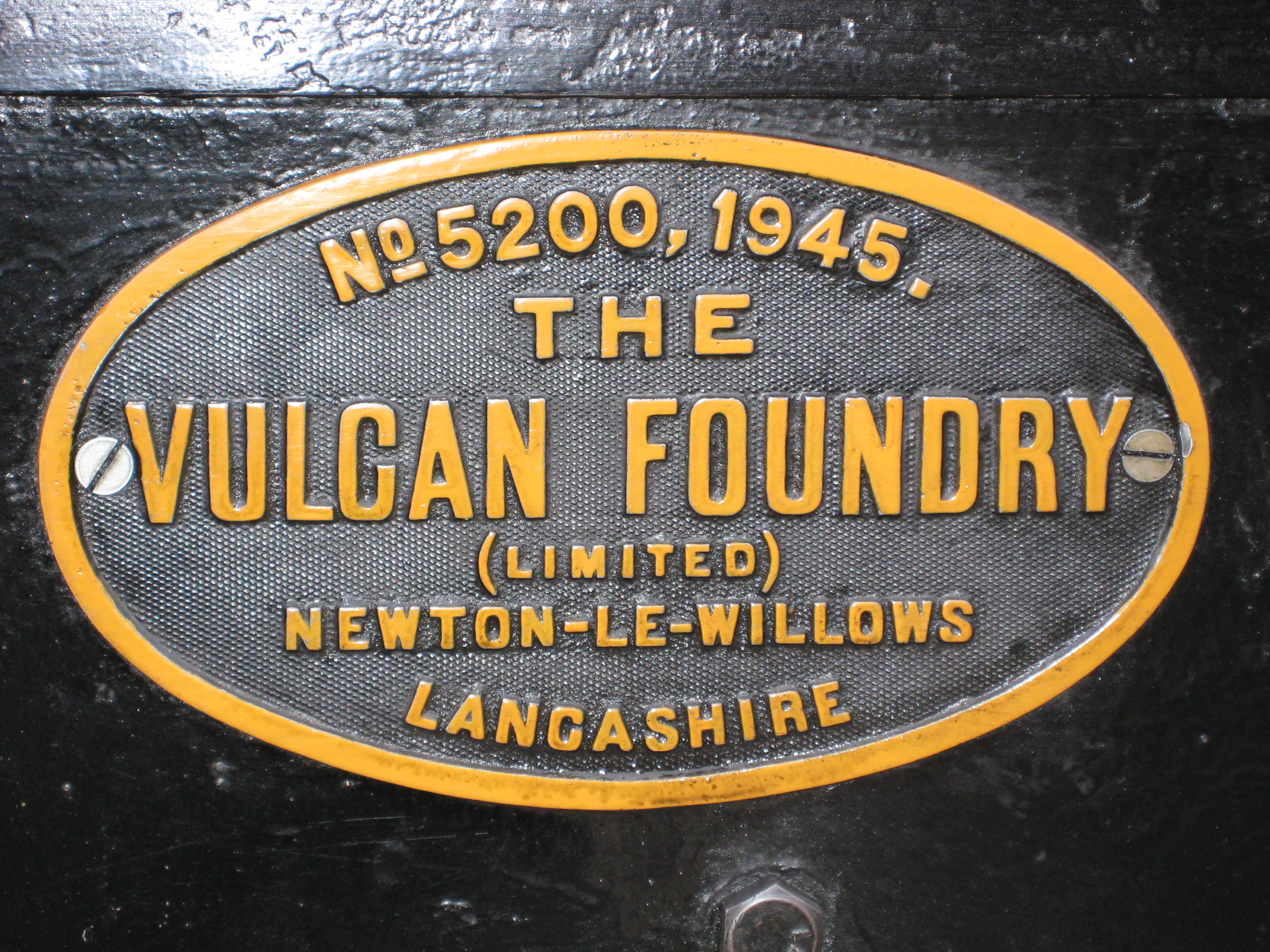
Makers' plate
