= Papyrus (disambiguation) =

Papyrus is a thick paper-like material produced from the pith of the papyrus plant, Cyperus papyrus.

Papyrus may also refer to:

- Papyrus (comics), a Belgian comic book series
- Papyrus (company), stationery and greeting card retailer purchased in 2009 by American Greetings
- Papyrus, a synonym for a genus of plants, Cyperus
- Papyrus (horse), a British Thoroughbred racehorse and sire
- Papyrus (typeface), a widely available typeface designed by Chris Costello
- Papyrus UK, a British youth suicide prevention charity
- LNER Class A3 2750 Papyrus, a London and North Eastern Railway locomotive named after the horse

== Computing ==
- Papyrus (software), an Open Source UML 2 tool
- Papyrus Design Group, a computer game developer

== Fictional characters ==
- Papyrus (Undertale), a major character from the 2015 video game Undertale

== See also ==
- List of ancient Egyptian papyri
