= 4300 =

4300 may refer to:

- IBM 4300 mainframe computer
- NS 4300 steam locomotives
- GWR 4300 Class steam locomotives
- Autolite 4300 carburetor
- The last year of the 43rd century
