= LNER Class A3 2750 Papyrus =

Express steam locomotive

Papyrus
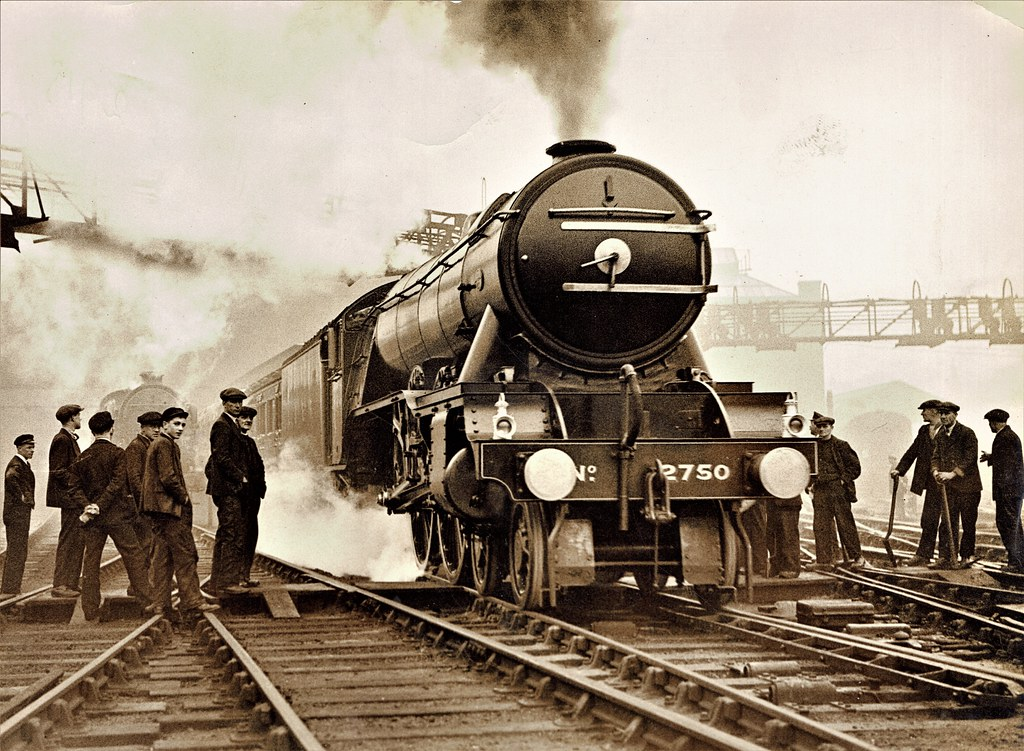
- Papyrus at King's Cross Station, 5 March 1935.
Type and origin
- Power type: Steam
- Designer: Nigel Gresley
- Builder: Doncaster Works
- Order number: 314
- Serial number: 1708
- Build date: March 1929
Specifications
- Configuration
  - Whyte: 4-6-2
- Gauge: 4 ft 8 1/2 in (1,435 mm) standard gauge
- Driver dia.: 80 in (2,032 mm)
- Length: 70 ft (21.34 m)
- Height: 13 ft (3.96 m)
- Loco weight: 96.25 long tons (97.79 t; 107.80 short tons)
- Cylinders: 3
Performance figures
- Tractive effort: 32,910 lbf (146.39 kN)
Career
- Operators: London and North Eastern Railway; British Railways
- Class: A3
- Numbers: 2750 (1929–1945); 96 (1946–1947); 60096 (1948 -1963)
- Official name: Papyrus
- Withdrawn: September 1963
- Disposition: Scrapped

LNER Class A3 2750 Papyrus was a 4-6-2 "Pacific" steam locomotive built for the London and North Eastern Railway (LNER) at Doncaster Works to a design of Nigel Gresley, entering service in March 1929. Primarily used to haul express passenger trains on the East Coast Main Line by LNER and its successor, British Railways, it is notable for achieving what was at the time a world record-breaking speed for a steam locomotive of 108 mph (174 km/h) on 5 March, 1935. A fictionalized account based on the locomotive's service history and speed record, 2750: Legend of a Locomotive by H.C. Webster, was published in 1953 and reprinted in 2016.

== History ==
The LNER Class A3 locomotives were first produced in 1927, as a development of the original Gresley Pacifics, the A1 Class introduced in 1922. Early improvements in the design were identified and implemented as the result of trials and test runs occurring in 1924/25. They included improved valve gear and superheater design and increased boiler pressure. These developments resulted in greater tractive effort and higher fuel efficiency, thus enabling the locomotives to haul heavy loads over longer distances without refueling. The tenders were also redesigned, with a corridor to enable crews to change during a long run.

Ultimately, the A3 class included both A1 locomotives rebuilt to A3 specifications and a further 27 locomotives built as such between 1927 and 1936. No. 2750 Papyrus was one of the latter, entering service in March 1929, with the purpose of hauling long-distance express passenger trains on the East Coast Main Line. In common with many members of the class, Papyrus was named for a contemporary race horse. The locomotive remained in service with the LNER until nationalization of Britain's railways in 1948, and continued in service with British Railways (renumbered 60096) until September 1963, when it was withdrawn and subsequently scrapped. H.C. Webster's book 2750: Legend of a Locomotive provides an account of the locomotive's service with the LNER, written from the perspective of the driver. The characters and dialog in the book are fictional, but it characterizes events and operations that appear to be broadly consistent with the known history of the locomotive.

== Speed record ==
British railway companies that operated main-line routes from London to Scotland had a history of competition to provide the fastest passenger service between these destinations, beginning in the late 1800s, with what became known as the Race to the North. Following the Railways Act 1921, many smaller companies were merged into groupings known as the 'Big Four', two of which operated the primary routes between London and Scotland: the London and North Eastern Railway (LNER) via the East Coast Main Line, and the London, Midland and Scottish (LMS) railway via the West Coast Main Line. Gresley's A1 and A3 class locomotives were assigned to the LNER's Flying Scotsman service, a daily non-stop express between London and Edinburgh via the east-coast route, beginning in 1928.

To test the capabilities of these locomotives for maximum speed and sustained high-speed running, Papyrus was selected for a trial run that occurred on 5 March 1935. During the trial, hauling a 217-ton load that included a dynamometer car to provide an accurate record of performance, Papyrus reached a peak speed of 108 mph (174 km/h) and maintained a speed above 100 mph (160 km/h) for 12.5 mi (20.1 km) on the southbound East Coast Main Line between Grantham and Peterborough. Subsequently, higher peak speeds were recorded for streamlined steam locomotives on Britain's railways, including the LNER Class A4 2509 Silver Link (112.5 mph (181.1 km/h), September 1935), the LMS Coronation Class 6220 Coronation (114 mph (183 km/h), June 1937) and the LNER Class A4 4468 Mallard (126 mph (203 km/h), July 1938, the current holder of the world speed record for a steam locomotive).

An unstreamlined French Chapelon class 231E SNCF Pacific also attained a peak speed of 108 mph (174 km/h) on a 1 in 200 downhill gradient on September 1935

== Models ==
Scale models of Gresley A3 Class locomotives are typically stylized as the Flying Scotsman, thereby representing the most famous and only surviving member of the class. Only a few models of Papyrus have been manufactured to date. Dapol produced an N-gauge model in 2012. Hattons produced an O-gauge model in 2019.
