= NER Dynamometer Car =

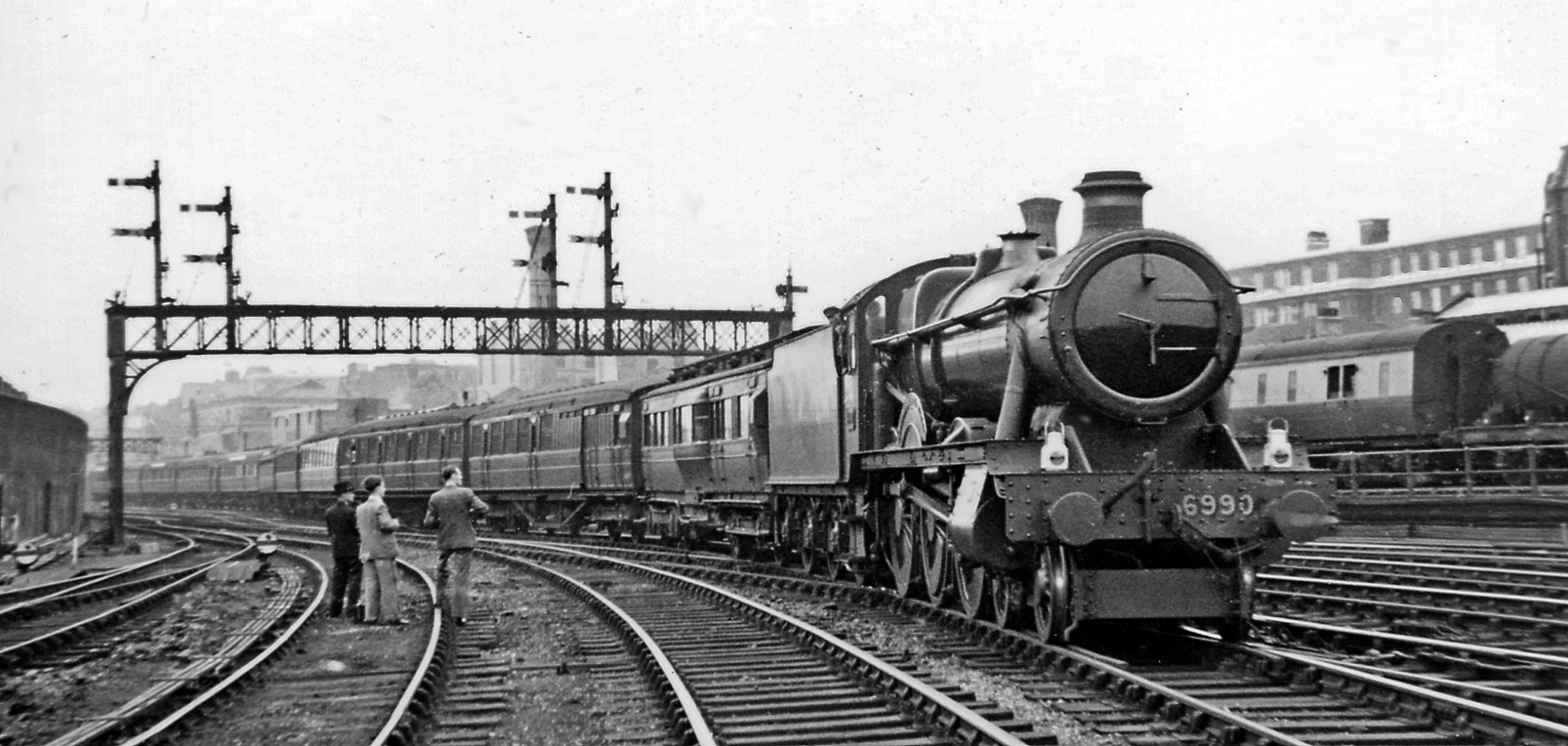
The NER Dynamometer Car behind 6990 Witherslack Hall during the 1948 Locomotive Exchange Trials

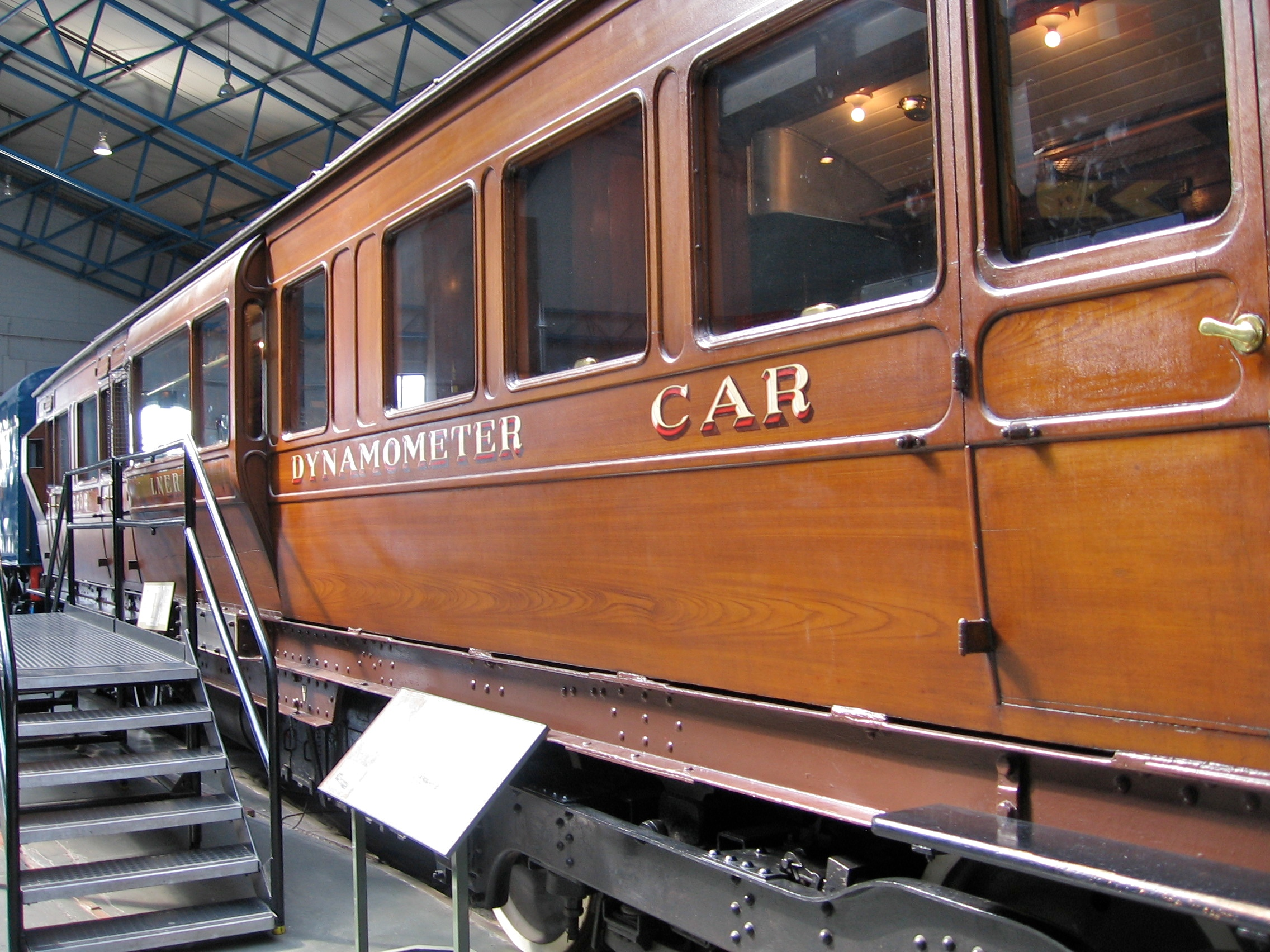
NER Dynamometer car at the National Railway Museum

The North Eastern Railway Dynamometer Car is a preserved railway dynamometer car. Built in 1906 by the North Eastern Railway (NER) at Darlington Works, its role was to scientifically measure the performance of trains in order to effect improvements. It initially ran as number 3591 and was painted in the NER's Crimson Lake livery.

In 1923 it was included in the acquisition of the NER by the LNER, and used extensively by Chief Engineer Nigel Gresley. In 1924 it was renumbered as 3591Y and painted in a lined imitation teak finish. In 1928 it was updated with Gresley's design of bogies and renumbered 23591. In 1938 it was used to record world record high speed runs on the East Coast Main Line behind 4468 Mallard. Post war it was renumbered 902502. It was used in the 1948 Locomotive Exchange Trials by British Railways, and in late 1948 was repainted and renumbered as E902502, still with the imitation teak finish, but unlined.

Its last use was in 1951, and was prepared for display at the Museum of British Transport in Clapham. It largely retains its British Railways paint but with the lettering and numbering altered to their post-war condition.

Part of the National Collection, it is preserved at the National Railway Museum in York.
