= KCR ex-WD Austerity 2-8-0 =

Type of steam locomotive

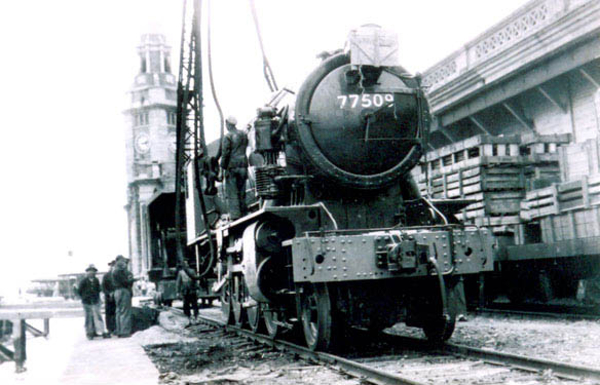
77509 being unloaded

The Kowloon-Canton Railway class of ex-WD Austerity 2-8-0 was a class of 12 steam locomotives, ex-WD Austerity 2-8-0. Unlike other KCR locomotives, they apparently did not receive a class letter designation.

At the end of the war several WD Austerity 2-8-0s were in store at the Longmoor Military Railway and 12 were bought by the Crown Agents. They were overhauled at Royal Woolwich Arsenal and despatched from Tilbury and King George V docks in 1946 and 1947 as shipping became available.

In Hong Kong, the livery was green with red buffer beam and 2-8-0 type wheels, white smokebox doors, numbers on cabsides and tender sides.

Five, 21-25, were converted to oil firing. Hulson grates were fitted to the remainder. 25 was later converted back to coal firing. They were replaced by diesels and fell out of use before withdrawal. All were scrapped. The last loco to run in service was 26 on 2 September 1962.

22 was destroyed on April 27 1956. The firebox crown collapsed leading to an explosion which killed six people

Details were as follows:

KCR No.	Former WD No.	Built	Builder	Works No.	Despatched	Landed Kowloon	Out of service	Withdrawn
21	78660	1944	North British	78660	1946	January 1947	May 1956	August 1957
22	77268	1944	North British	25139	1946	December 1946	April 1956	August 1957
23	70805	1944	North British	25313	1946	December 1946	June 1958	August 1959
24	77509	1944	Vulcan Foundry	5025	1946	December 1946	April 1957	August 1957
25	77490	1944	Vulcan Foundry	5006	1946	February 1947	August 1957	August 1957
26	77478	1944	Vulcan Foundry	4994	1946	February 1947	September 1962	May 1963
27	77269	1944	North British	25140	1946	August 1947	December 1960	March 1962
28	70820	1944	North British	24898	1946	August 1947	September 1955	August 1957
29	78694	1944	Vulcan Foundry	5095	1947	March 1948	September 1962	March 1963
30	77450	1943	Vulcan Foundry	4966	1947	March 1948	June 1956	August 1957
31	78659	1944	Vulcan Foundry	5060	1947	March 1948	May 1955	August 1957
32	79237	1944	Vulcan Foundry	5180	1947	March 1948	December 1956	August 1959
