= Dynamometer car =

Type of railroad car

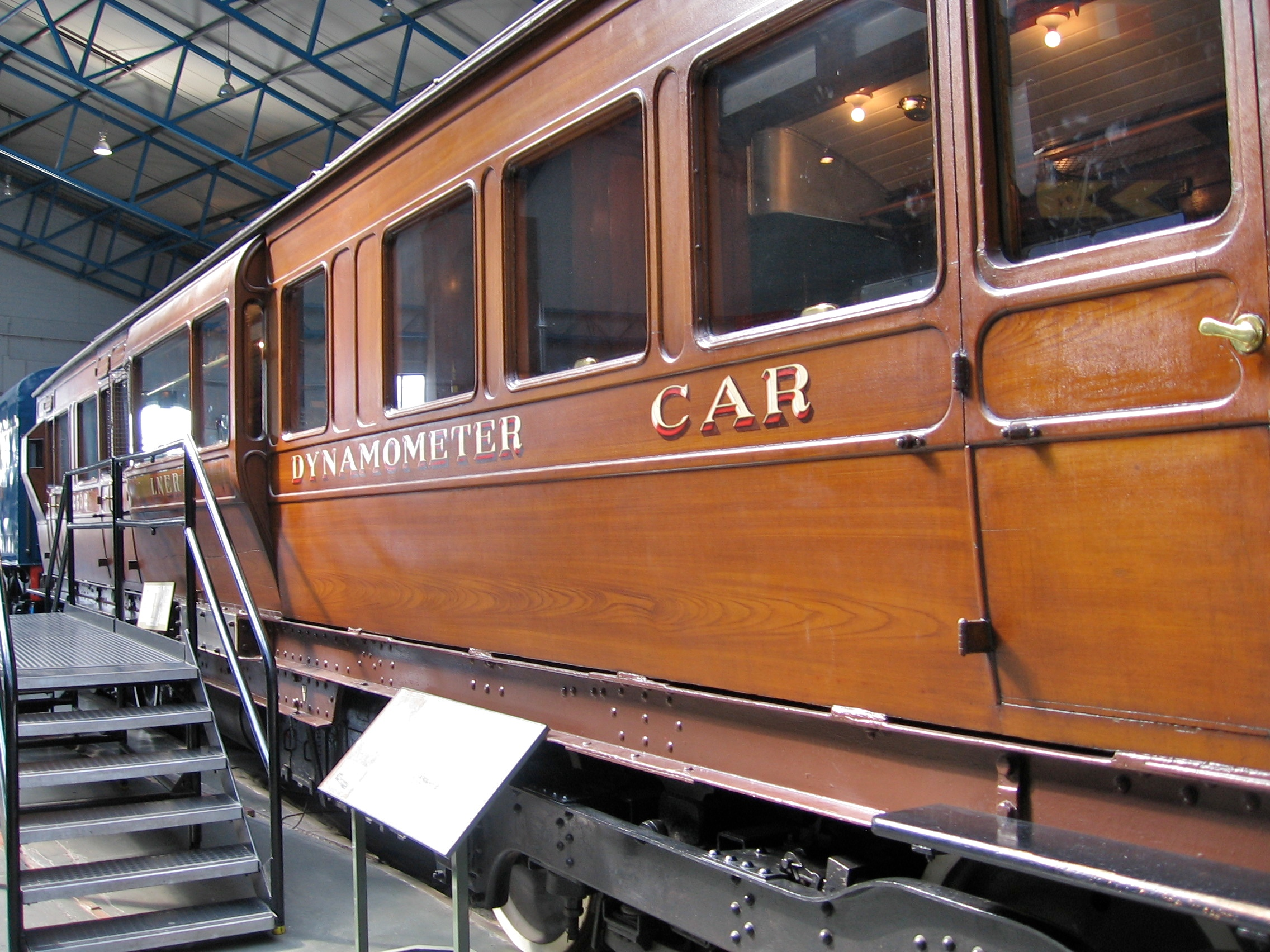
A North Eastern Railway dynamometer car on display at the National Railway Museum in York

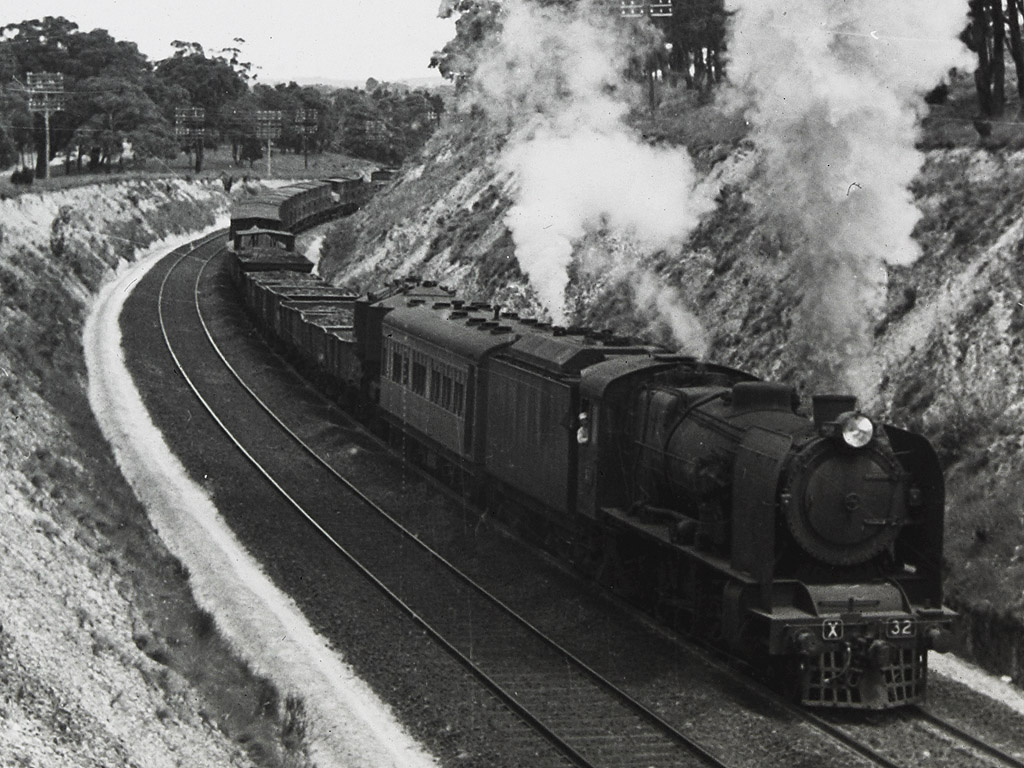
A Victorian and South Australian Railways joint stock dynamometer car (coupled between the locomotive tender and the train) being used to record the performance of a VR X class locomotive running on pulverised brown coal

A dynamometer car is a railroad maintenance of way car used for measuring various aspects of a locomotive's performance. Measurements include tractive effort (pulling force), power, top speed, etc.

== History ==
The first dynamometer car was probably one built in about 1838 by the "Father of Computing" Charles Babbage. Working for the Great Western Railway of Great Britain, he equipped a passenger carriage to be placed between an engine and train and record data on a continuously moving roll of paper. The recorded data included the engine's pulling force, a plot of the carriage's path, and the carriage's vertical shake. The work was undertaken to support the Great Western Railway's position in the controversy over standardizing the British track gauge.

In the United States, the Pennsylvania Railroad began using dynamometer cars in the 1860s. The first modern dynamometer car in the United States was built in 1874 by P. H. Dudley for the New York Central Railroad.

The early cars used a system of springs and mechanical linkages to effectively use the front coupler as a scale, directly measuring the force on it. The car would also have a means of measuring the train's speed. Later versions used a hydraulic cylinder and line to transmit the force to the recording device.

Modern dynamometer cars typically use electronic solid-state measuring devices and instrumentation such as strain gauges.

A LNER dynamometer car was used to record No 4468 Mallard's speed record in 1938, and has been preserved at the National Railway Museum in York, England. This was also used for British Railways 1948 Locomotive Exchange Trials along with two other dynamometer cars, both of which have also survived into preservation.

A car originally belonging to the Chicago, Burlington and Quincy Railroad is preserved at the National Railroad Museum located in Green Bay, Wisconsin. A car built for the Chicago, Milwaukee, St. Paul and Pacific Railroad is preserved at the Illinois Railway Museum.

== Usage ==
While the principal purpose of the dynamometer car was to measure the locomotive's power output, other data were typically collected, such as smoke box data, throttle settings, valve cut-offs, fuel burn rates, and water usage, to determine the locomotive's overall performance and efficiency.

Data would typically be recorded on time-indexed continuous paper recording rolls for the pull and velocity. Power would later be calculated manually from these data for early cars. Some later cars were equipped with a mechanical integrator to directly record power.

A separate use for the car was to test a particular rail route and rate it for tonnage by running it with a dynamometer car, recording the effects of grades and curvature on capacity and the resulting power requirements for that line.

== Power calculations ==
The operating principle of the dynamometer car is based on the basic equation for power being equal to force times distance over time:
$$P = \frac{F d}{t}.$$
This equation can be reduced to power equals force times velocity:
$$P = F \frac{d}{t}=F v.$$
In other words, the instantaneous power output of the locomotive can be calculated by measuring the pull on the coupler and multiplying by the current speed.

$$P = 50,000 ~ \text{lbf} \cdot \frac{30 ~ \text{mi}} {\text{h}} \cdot \frac{5280 ~ \text{ft}}{\text{mi}} \cdot \frac{\text{h}}{3600 ~ \text{s}} = 2,200,000 ~ \frac{\text{ft} {\cdot} \text{lbf}}{\text{s}}.$$

Converting to horsepower gives:

$$P = 2,200,000 ~ \frac{\text{ft} \cdot \text{lbf}} {\text{s}} \cdot \frac{1 ~ \text{hp}}{550 ~ \text{ft} {\cdot} \text{lbf} / \text{s}} = 4,000 ~ \text{hp}.$$
