= WD Austerity 2-8-0 =

Heavy freight steam locomotive

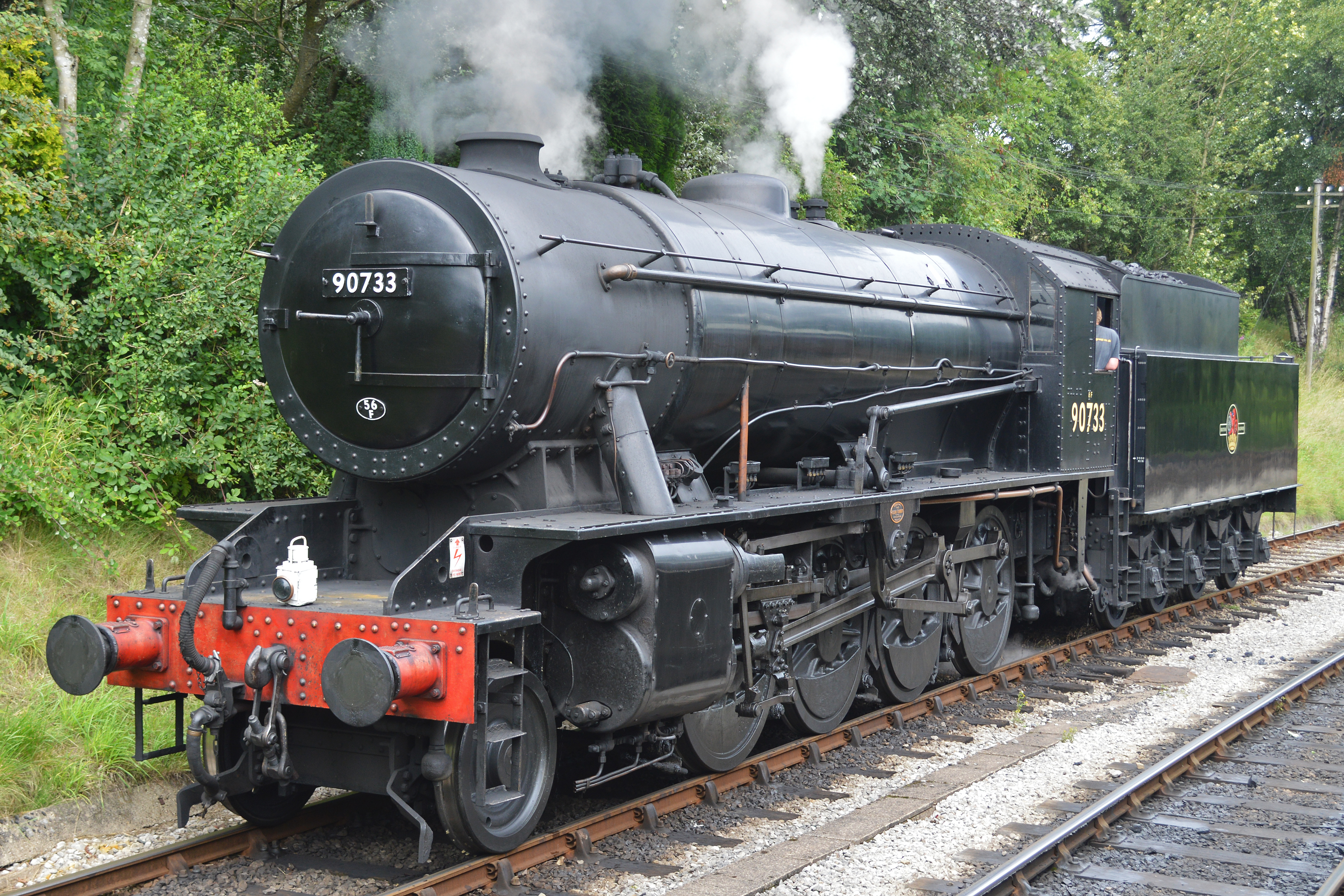
- 90733 at Oxenhope, August 2015
Type and origin
- Power type: Steam
- Designer: Robert Riddles
- Builder: North British Locomotive Company; Vulcan Foundry
- Build date: 1943–45
- Total produced: 935
Specifications
- Configuration
  - Whyte: 2-8-0
  - UIC: 1′D h2
- Gauge: 4 ft 8 1/2 in (1,435 mm)
- Leading dia.: 3 ft 2 in (965 mm)
- Driver dia.: 4 ft 8 1/2 in (1,435 mm)
- Length: 63 ft 6 in (19.35 m) over buffers
- Axle load: 15 long tons 12 cwt (34,900 lb or 15.9 t)
- Adhesive weight: 61 long tons 5 cwt (137,200 lb or 62.2 t)
- Loco weight: 70 long tons 5 cwt (157,400 lb or 71.4 t)
- Tender weight: 55 long tons 10 cwt (124,300 lb or 56.4 t)
- Fuel type: Coal
- Fuel capacity: 9 long tons 0 cwt (20,200 lb or 9.1 t)
- Water cap.: 5,000 imperial gallons (23,000 L; 6,000 US gal)
- Firebox
  - Grate area: 28.6 sq ft (2.66 m^{2})
- Boiler pressure: 225 lbf/in^{2} (1.55 MPa)
- Heating surface
  - Firebox: 168 sq ft (15.6 m^{2})
  - Tubes: 1,068 sq ft (99.2 m^{2})
  - Flues: 451 sq ft (41.9 m^{2})
- Superheater
  - Type: 28-element Melesco
  - Heating area: 298 sq ft (27.7 m^{2})
- Cylinders: Two, outside
- Cylinder size: 19 in × 28 in (483 mm × 711 mm)
- Valve gear: Walschaerts
- Valve type: 10-inch (250 mm) piston valves
Performance figures
- Tractive effort: 34,215 lbf (152.20 kN)
Career
- Power class: 8F
- Nicknames: Ozzie
- Axle load class: Route availability 6
- Disposition: One preserved, remainder scrapped.

The War Department (WD) "Austerity" 2-8-0 is a type of heavy freight steam locomotive that was introduced in 1943 for war service. A total of 935 were built, making this one of the most-produced classes of British steam locomotive. They were nicknamed Ozzies by the railwaymen.

== Overview ==
The Austerity 2-8-0 was based on the LMS Stanier Class 8F, which until that point had been the government's standard design. The 8F was reliable and powerful and had proved to have the performance required. But it had been originally designed and built for main-line heavy and express freight service on UK railways. It was intensive in labour, materials and time to construct in large quantities. At a time when both manpower and key materials were in short supply in the UK, an 8F required 33,000 man-hours to build and each locomotive included 17 tons of steel castings and 16 tons of steel forgings - capacity for both the material itself and the production capacity to make these components was in strong demand for armaments production. In hotter, dustier regions with poor-quality water, fuels and lubricants than the 8F had been intended for, some specific mechanical shortcomings had also been identified.

Robert Riddles, then engaged as Deputy Director General of Equipment for the Royal Engineers, was tasked with adapting the 8F to wartime conditions of both construction and service. He was assisted by Thomas Coleman, Chief Locomotive Draughtsman of the LMS, and from design offices of several private locomotive building companies. His goal was to reduce the time, man-hours and strategic materials needed to produce a locomotive with the same performance and capabilities as the 8F, and which would be operationally interchangeable with the LMS engine.

The main design changes were:

- A parallel boiler with a round-topped firebox, which was simpler to produce than the tapered boiler with a Belpaire firebox of the 8F.
- The firebox was steel rather than copper. This would give the boiler a shorter service life at a large reduction in initial financial and material cost, and was easier to repair in remote regions.
- All the 8F's steel castings were replaced by fabricated steel plate or cast iron. Some of the steel forgings were similarly replaced.
- Cast iron wheels in place of steel wheel centres. The leading wheels were solid rather than spoked. The driving wheels were not secondary-balanced, as the 8Fs were. This saved production time but limited the WD version to 40 mph or so before the ride quality and stability deteriorated excessively.
- The cylinder casting and minor fittings were modified for ease of production and to accommodate other design changes.
- Mechanical lubricators for the axle boxes and cylinders were replaced by wick-action and displacement-type lubricators.
- The 8F crosshead with bars above and below the piston rod was replaced with a marine-type design with parallel bars above the piston rod. This was to eliminate the issue of dust and dirt collecting on the lower bar and damaging the crosshead.
- The cab and footplate design was simplified. Most notably, the cab side windows of the 8F, with one fixed and one siding glazed panel, were replaced by open apertures with solid sliding panels for weather protection. All curved and non-horizontal elements on the footplate were removed.
- The 8F's three-axle tender was replaced by one with four axles for better weight distribution and stability on light and unevenly-laid track and to better suit running long distances at service speeds in reverse. The tender itself was of simplified design, with welded right-angle sheet steel. The coal bunker was inset from the sides to improve visibility when running tender-first.
- Where existing 8F parts were carried over, new production methods were developed to reduce the time and manpower involved.

As well as significant savings in key strategic materials, the WD 2-8-0 design required 6000 fewer man-hours to construct than the original LMS 8F - a saving of roughly 20 per cent.

Other considerations were included in the WD design, such as the boiler being able to be converted between coal and oil fuel without having to lift the boiler from the frames.

The North British Locomotive Company (NBL) of Glasgow built 545 (split between their two works at Hyde Park and Queen's Park) and the Vulcan Foundry (VF) of Newton-le-Willows, Lancashire, built 390. North British also built a larger 2-10-0 version.

WD numbers	Builder	Works Nos.	Quantity	Date
800–879	NBL (Queen's Park)	24891–970	80	1944
7000–49	NBL (Hyde Park)	24971–25020	50	1943
7050–7149	VF	4866–4965	100	1943
7150–7262	NBL (Hyde Park)	25021–170	113	1943
7263–7299	NBL (Hyde Park)	25021–170	37	1944
7300–7416	NBL (Queen's Park)	25171–320	117	1943
7417–49	NBL (Queen's Park)	25171–320	33	1944
7450–64	VF	4966–80	15	1943
7465–7509	VF	4981–5025	45	1944
8510–30	NBL (Queen's Park)	25321–70	21	1944
8531–59	NBL (Hyde Park)	25321–70	29	1945
8560–8611	NBL (Hyde Park)	25371–435	52	1944
8612–8624	NBL (Hyde Park)	25371–435	13	1945
8625–8718	VF	5026–5119	94	1944
9177–9243	VF	5120–86	67	1944
9244–9312	VF	5187–5255	69	1945

WD nos. 800–879 were ordered as LMS Class 8F. No. 9312, the last one built, was named Vulcan when new. NBL builder's plates were not all in correct sequence, and were mixed up between the two works as well as between batches. All locomotives had their WD numbers increased by 70000 prior to shipping to mainland Europe; those completed after 5 September 1944 carried their 70000 series numbers from new. All but three (WD nos. 77223, 77369 and 79250) saw service with the British Army in mainland Europe after D-Day.

== Post-war disposal ==
After the end of the conflict, the War Department disposed of 930 locomotives (two engines being retained by the War Department and three being scrapped).

200 were sold to the LNER, which classified them as "Class O7" and numbered them 3000–3199. In 1948, 533 more were purchased by the British Transport Commission.

With the formation of British Railways, the 733 locomotives were renumbered into the 90000–90732 series. Only one of those, No. 90732, was named, becoming Vulcan, after the Vulcan Foundry where many of the locomotives were built.

In 1946, 12 were exported to the British colony of Hong Kong to work the Kowloon–Canton Railway. Six were scrapped in 1956, but the final two survived until September 1962.

The other 184 locomotives remained in mainland Europe, mostly working in and around the Netherlands for Nederlandse Spoorwegen.

Finally, one went to the USATC (WD no. 79189) in an exchange for an USATC S160 Class locomotive in the postwar exchange of WD and USATC locomotives.

No. of engines	Country	Company	Class	Local numbers
733	Great Britain	British Railways (BR)	BR ex-WD Austerity 2-8-0	90000–90732
184*	Netherlands	Nederlandse Spoorwegen (NS)	NS 4300	4301–4537 (with gaps)
12	Hong Kong	Kowloon-Canton Railway (KCR)	KCR ex-WD Austerity 2-8-0	21-32
2	Sweden	Swedish State Railways (SSR)	SJ G11	1930-1931
1	United States	US Army Transportation Corps		
* Of the NS engines, 2 subsequently were sold to Swedish State Railways forming SJ G11.

== Postwar WD service ==
Two locomotives continued to be held in WD stock, seeing service on the Longmoor Military Railway in Hampshire, along with two of the WD Austerity 2-10-0s and other smaller locomotives. In the WD 1957 renumbering scheme, they were renumbered 400/1. Details were as follows:

WD No.	WD 1957 No.	Name	Builder	Works No.	Date built	Notes
77337	400	Sir Guy Williams	North British (Queens Park)	25205	1943	Name previously on 78672
79250	401	Major General McMullen	Vulcan Foundry	5193	1945	

== Accidents and incidents ==
- Soham rail disaster: On 2 June 1944, WD locomotive No. 7337 was hauling a freight train which caught fire as it approached Soham, Cambridgeshire. The train consisted of 51 wagons carrying bombs. The train was divided behind the burning wagon, with the front portion being taken forward with the intention of isolating the wagon in open countryside. Its cargo detonated at Soham station, killing the fireman and the Soham signalman and injuring the train's driver and guard. Soham station was severely damaged, but the line was re-opened within eighteen hours. For their actions, Benjamin Gimbert and James Nightall were awarded George Crosses.
- On 16 August 1945, WD locomotives 77125 and 77238 were involved in a head-on collision near Kleve, North Rhine-Westphalia, West Germany. Both locomotives were scrapped.
- On 6 November 1945, NS 4485 (ex WD 77183) was seriously damaged after a head-on collision between a single locomotive (no pilot and driver refused to wait) coming from Kleve and SL66 coming from Groesbeek near Kranenburg, North Rhine-Westphalia, West Germany. The locomotive was sent for repairs to the workshop in Mechelen (B) but, on September 26, 1946 it was sent to Roosendaal (NL) and written off there on 15 January 1947.
- On 26 January 1945, NS 4504 (ex WD 78693) was seriously damaged after a head-on collision between RF39 and train 4505 on the single track railway bridge in Ravenstein. The locomotive was sent for repairs at the workshop in Mechelen (B) but, on September 26, 1946, was eventually sent to Roosendaal (NL) and written off there on 15 January 1947.
- On 17 September 1950, WD locomotive No. 77195 ran away from Neville Hill Locomotive Shed, Leeds, Yorkshire and subsequently crashed through buffers at Marsh Lane Goods Yard, Leeds.
- On 2 December 1953, locomotive No. 90048 ran off the end of the loop at Billingham, County Durham whilst hauling a train. An express freight train ran into the wreckage and was derailed.

== Preservation ==
One WD 2-8-0 is preserved. Vulcan Foundry works No. 5200 was repatriated from Sweden to the Keighley and Worth Valley Railway. It was SJ Class G11 number 1931. It was overhauled to its original condition, finished in 2007, which involved building a new cab and tender, to become BR "No. 90733". After test runs, 90733 ran its first passenger train on Monday 23 July 2007.

== Gallery ==
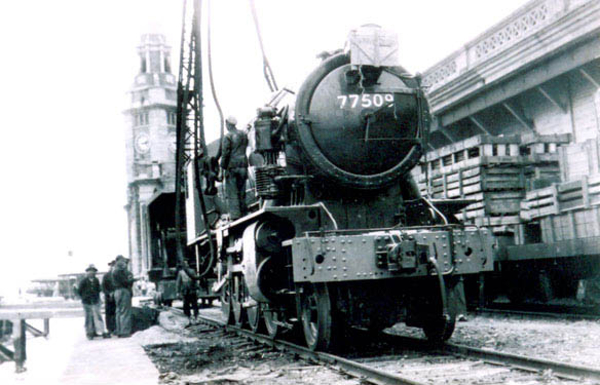
77509 being unloaded at Hong Kong (1947)

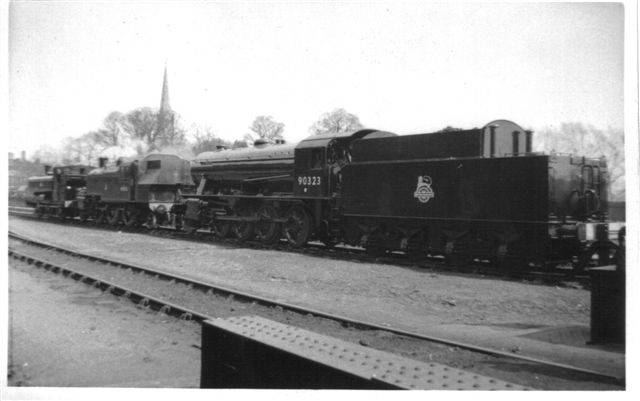
90323 fresh out of Swindon Works (1954)

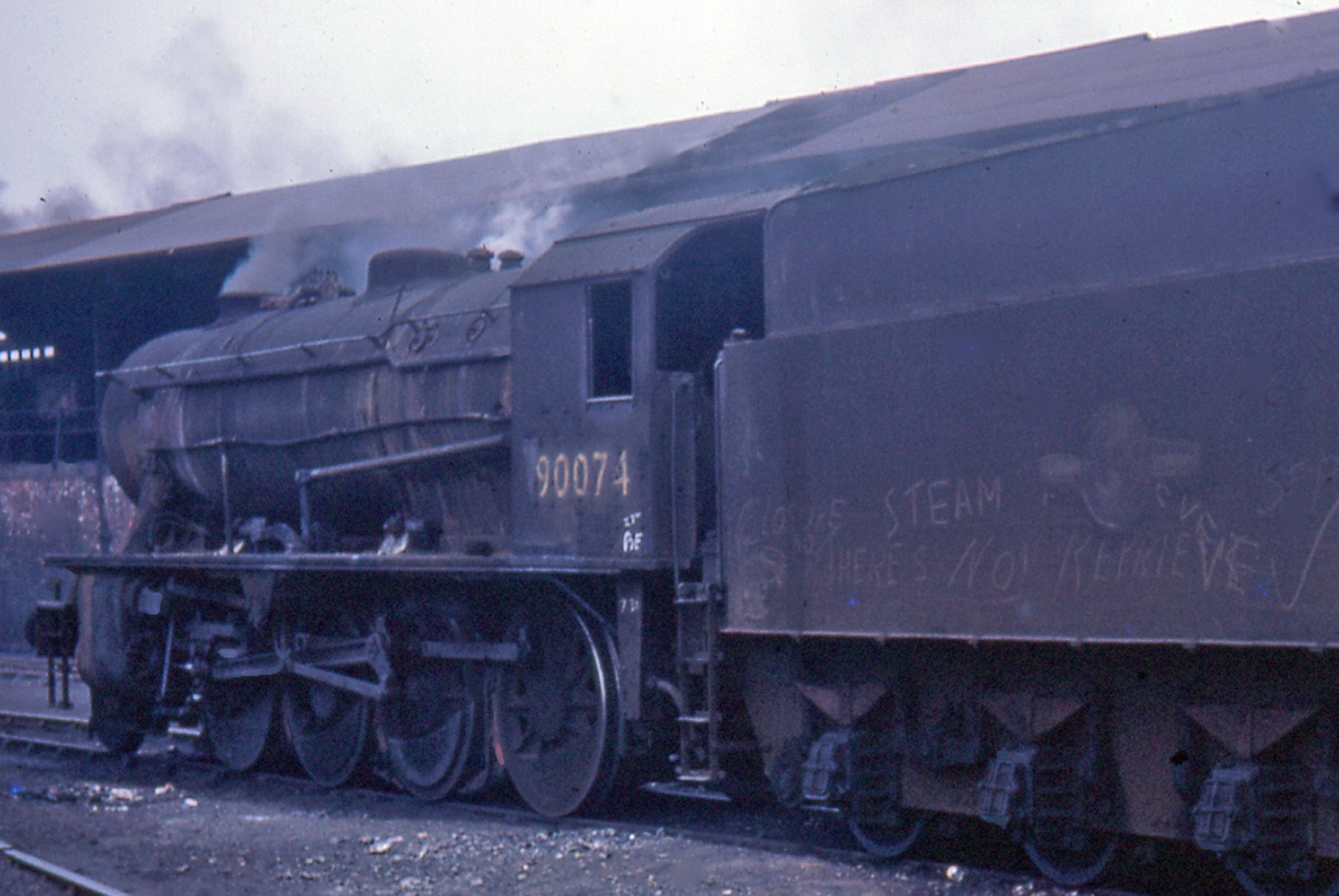
90074 at West Hartlepool shed north-east of England (1967)

== See also ==
- BR ex-WD Austerity 2-8-0 - locomotives of the class taken into British Rail service
- WD Austerity 2-10-0 - a similar but larger design
- USATC S160 Class - American built equivalent
