= BR ex-WD Austerity 2-8-0 =

Steam locomotive

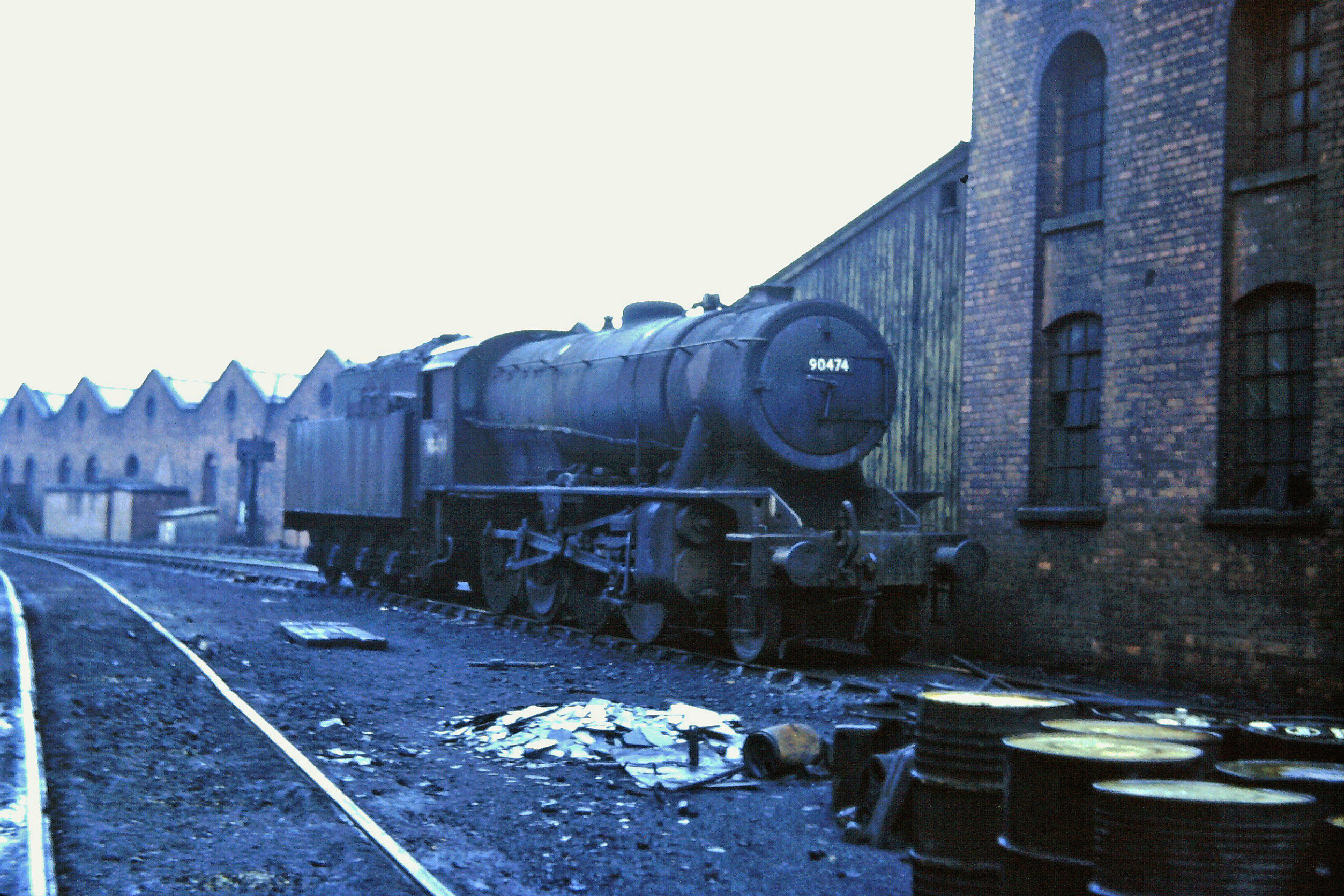
- 90474 at Woodford Halse, 1964
Type and origin
- Power type: Steam
- Designer: R.A. Riddles
- Builder: North British Locomotive Company; Vulcan Foundry
- Build date: 1943–45
- Total produced: 733
Specifications
- Configuration
  - Whyte: 2-8-0
  - UIC: 1′D h2
- Gauge: 4 ft 8 1/2 in (1,435 mm)
- Leading dia.: 3 ft 2 in (965 mm)
- Driver dia.: 4 ft 8 1/2 in (1,435 mm)
- Length: 63 ft 6 in (19.35 m) over buffers
- Axle load: 15 long tons 12 cwt (34,900 lb or 15.9 t)
- Adhesive weight: 61 long tons 5 cwt (137,200 lb or 62.2 t)
- Loco weight: 70 long tons 5 cwt (157,400 lb or 71.4 t)
- Tender weight: 55 long tons 10 cwt (124,300 lb or 56.4 t)
- Fuel type: Coal
- Fuel capacity: 9 long tons 0 cwt (20,200 lb or 9.1 t)
- Water cap.: 5,000 imperial gallons (23,000 L; 6,000 US gal)
- Firebox
  - Grate area: 28.6 sq ft (2.66 m^{2})
- Boiler pressure: 225 lbf/in^{2} (1.55 MPa)
- Heating surface
  - Firebox: 168 sq ft (15.6 m^{2})
  - Tubes: 1,068 sq ft (99.2 m^{2})
  - Flues: 451 sq ft (41.9 m^{2})
- Superheater
  - Type: 28-element Melesco
  - Heating area: 298 sq ft (27.7 m^{2})
- Cylinders: Two, outside
- Cylinder size: 19 in × 28 in (483 mm × 711 mm)
- Valve gear: Walschaerts
- Valve type: 10-inch (250 mm) piston valves
Performance figures
- Tractive effort: 34,215 lbf (152.20 kN)
Career
- Operators: War Department; London and North Eastern Railway; British Railways
- Power class: 8F
- Numbers: 90000-90732
- Axle load class: Route availability 6
- Withdrawn: 1959-1967
- Disposition: All scrapped.

The British Railways (BR) ex-WD Austerity 2-8-0 was a class of 733 2-8-0 steam locomotives designed for heavy freight. These locomotives of the WD Austerity 2-8-0 type had been constructed by the War Department, as war locomotives 1943–1945. After the war, they were surplus and so in 1946 the LNER bought 200 of them, classifying them as LNER Class O7, and by the end of 1947 when the LNER was nationalised, had taken another 278 O7s on loan. After nationalisation, BR purchased 533 more 2-8-0s, including all of those on loan, giving a class total of 733. As many of these needed overhauling before being put to work, they were activated slowly. BR chose to reclassify from LNER Class O7 and renumbered them from the 6xxxx LNER series in the 90000–732 series for BR standard designs.

== Naming ==
90732 was named Vulcan after the Vulcan Foundry.

== Classification ==
BR considered them as standard classes, numbering them in the numbering series allocated for BR standard classes, assigned them the boiler diagram BR10; while their tenders were assigned the diagram BR5. BR built 53 new boilers at Crewe between 1951 and 1954.

== Operation ==
The class were used almost entirely on freight services, and were always unusual on passenger work. Well over half the total number were always on the former LNER system, from East Anglia up to Scotland, and there was also a large number across the former Lancashire & Yorkshire railway depots. Some were initially used on the Southern Region, but later left there, while another smaller group was on the Western Region for much of their lives. The Scottish ones later spread from just the ex-LNER lines across the rest of the Region.

== Accidents and incidents ==
- On 16 January 1958, locomotive 90277 was standing foul of the line at Preston when it was run into by a passenger train due to a signalman's error. The passenger train was derailed, 90277 ended up on its side. Thirteen people were injured.

== Withdrawal ==
The engines were withdrawn from service as follows:

Year	No. withdrawn	Nos
1959	1	90083
1960	2	90062 etc.
1961	0	
1962	80	
1963	97	
1964	125	
1965	201	
1966	104	
1967	123	

== Preservation ==
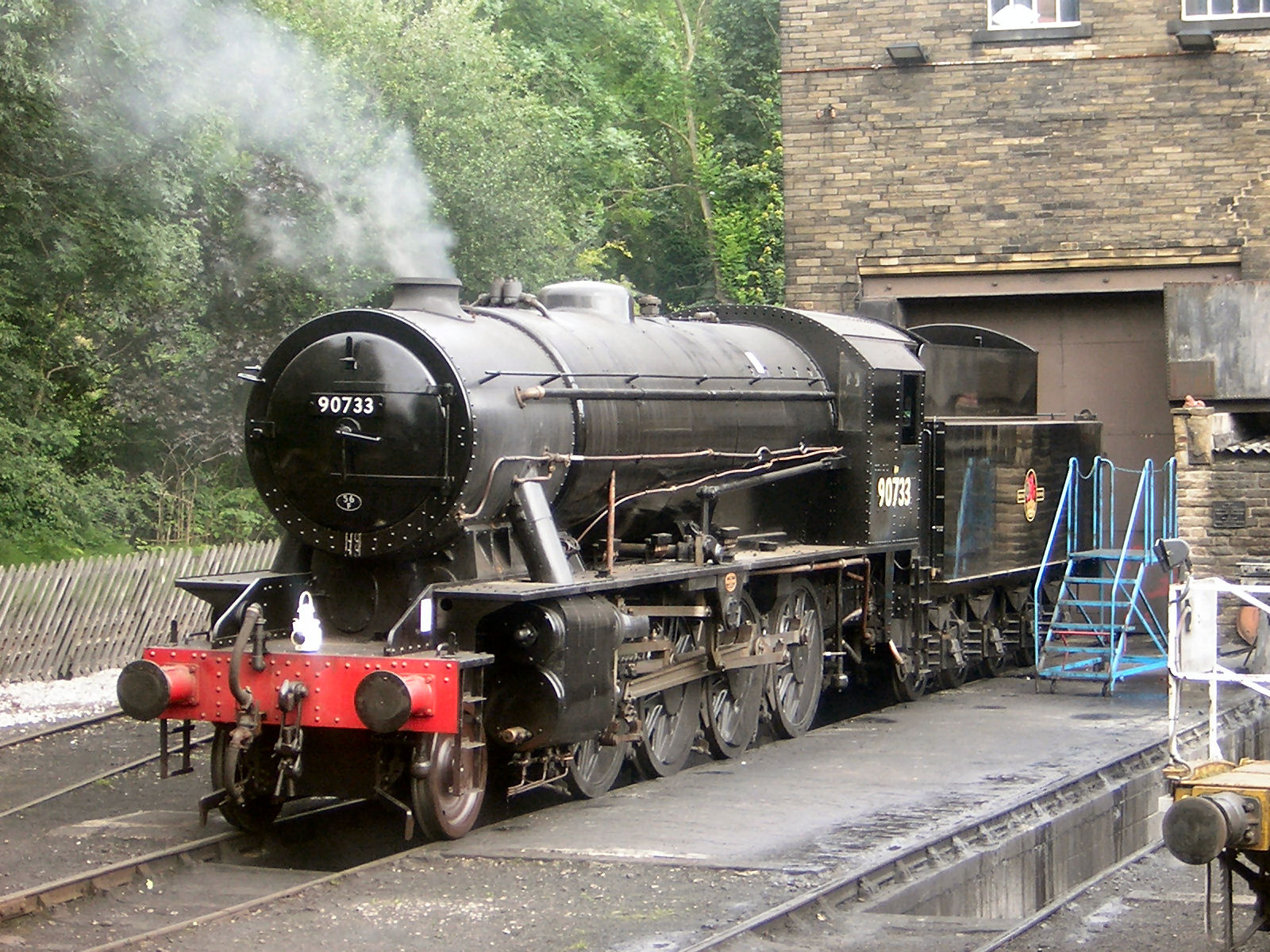
Preserved Austerity in British Railways livery and carrying a BR series number, was actually never a BR engine.

None of the BR Austerity 2-8-0s were preserved. However, one Austerity 2-8-0 (out of a total of 935 engines) has survived; WD No. 79257. This has returned to Britain via the Netherlands and Sweden, and has been restored to original condition and given the "BR number" 90733. It is based at the Keighley & Worth Valley Railway.

== See also ==
- BR ex-WD Austerity 2-10-0
- WD Austerity 2-8-0
