= NS 4300 =

Series of 237 1'D locomotives

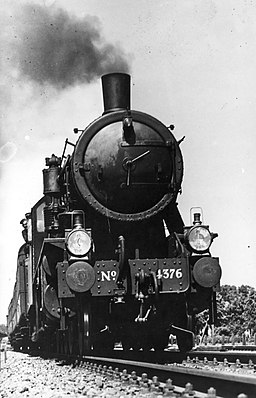
- NS 4376 near Ermelo in 1946
Type and origin
- Power type: Steam
- Builder: North British Locomotive Company, Vulcan Foundry
- Build date: 1946
- Total produced: 237
Specifications
- Configuration
  - Whyte: 2-8-0
  - UIC: 1'D
- Gauge: 1,435 mm (4 ft 8 1/2 in)
- Driver dia.: 1,435 mm (4 ft 8.5 in)
- Length: 19,354 mm (63 ft 6.0 in)
- Height: 4,487 mm (14 ft 8.7 in)
- Loco weight: 71.4 t (78.7 short tons; 70.3 long tons)
- Tender weight: 56.4 t (62.2 short tons; 55.5 long tons)
- Fuel type: Coal
- Fuel capacity: 9.1 t (10.0 short tons; 9.0 long tons)
- Water cap.: 22.7 m^{3} (5,000 imp gal)
- Firebox
  - Grate area: 2.66 m^{2} (28.6 sq ft)
- Boiler pressure: 12 kg/cm^{2} (170 psi) (was 15.8 kg/cm^{2} (225 psi))
- Heating surface
  - Firebox: 15.2 m^{2} (164 sq ft)
  - Tubes: 128.7 m^{2} (1,385 sq ft)
- Superheater
  - Heating area: 34.8 m^{2} (375 sq ft)
- Valve gear: Walschaerts
Performance figures
- Maximum speed: 65 km/h (40 mph)
- Tractive effort: 95.12 kN (21,380 lbf) (was 152.20 kN (34,220 lbf))
Career
- Operators: NS
- Nicknames: Dokota, Small Jeeps
- Withdrawn: 1948 - 1958
- Preserved: No. 4464 preserved in England

The NS 4300 was a series of steam locomotives of the Dutch Railways (NS), taken over from the British War Department.

These Austerity locomotives, with 1'D wheel arrangement, were built between 1943 and 1945 by North British Locomotive Company and the Vulcan Foundry for the British War Department to supply the British Army with supplies during their fight against the German army in the West of mainland Europe.

Some of the British War Department were in service with NS after the war. Although a total of 237 locomotives were leased, they weren't in service simultaneously. The drivers, who had to stand on the left side of these English machines, had a lot of trouble due to drifting smoke. The Dutch Railways soon lowered the boiler pressure from 15.8 kg/cm² (225 psi) to 12 kg/cm² (170 psi) and extended the chimneys to clear the driver's view from the drifting smoke.

The locomotives were nicknamed 'Little Jeeps'.

== Design ==
The Austerity 2-8-0 was based on the LMS Class 8F, which had been the government's standard design until that point. Several changes were made to the 8F design by R.A. Riddles to prioritize low cost over the life of the design. These included a boiler of simpler construction that was parallel rather than tapered and a round-topped firebox instead of a Belpaire firebox. The firebox was made of steel rather than the rare and more expensive copper.

== Construction ==
Construction was divided between two companies. The North British Locomotive Company (NBL) in Glasgow built 545 locomotives (divided between their two workshops in Hyde Park and Queen's Park) and the Vulcan Foundry (VF) in Newton-le-Willows, Lancashire, built 390 locomotives.

The North British Locomotive Company also built the larger NS 5000 WD.

== Preservation ==
There are no locomotives of this series left in the Netherlands.

One of the original WD 2-8-0 is preserved on the Keighley & Worth Valley Railway in Yorkshire. It was built by the Vulcan Foundry as No. 5200. The locomotive was purchased from the Swedish State Railways (Statens Järnvägar). It was classified there as SJ Class G11 No. 1931.

In 2007 the locomotive was restored to its original condition, with a new cab and tender having to be built. The locomotive then became British Railways (BR) No. 90733 and after a few test runs, 90733 ran its first passenger train on the KWVR on 23 June 2007.

== Gallery ==
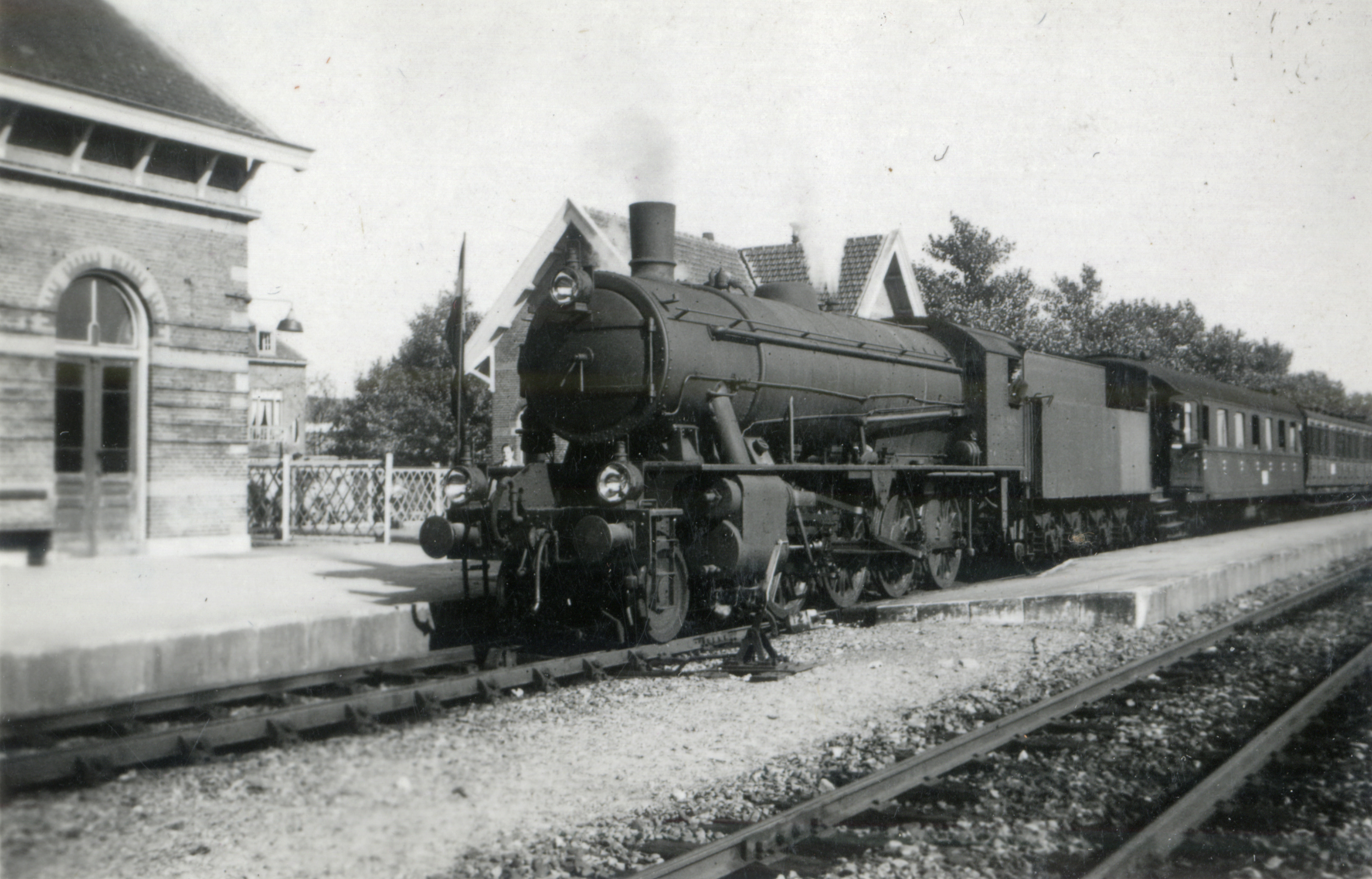
Locomotive from the series 4300 ("Austerities") of the N.S. with a train at the railway station in Waalwijk.

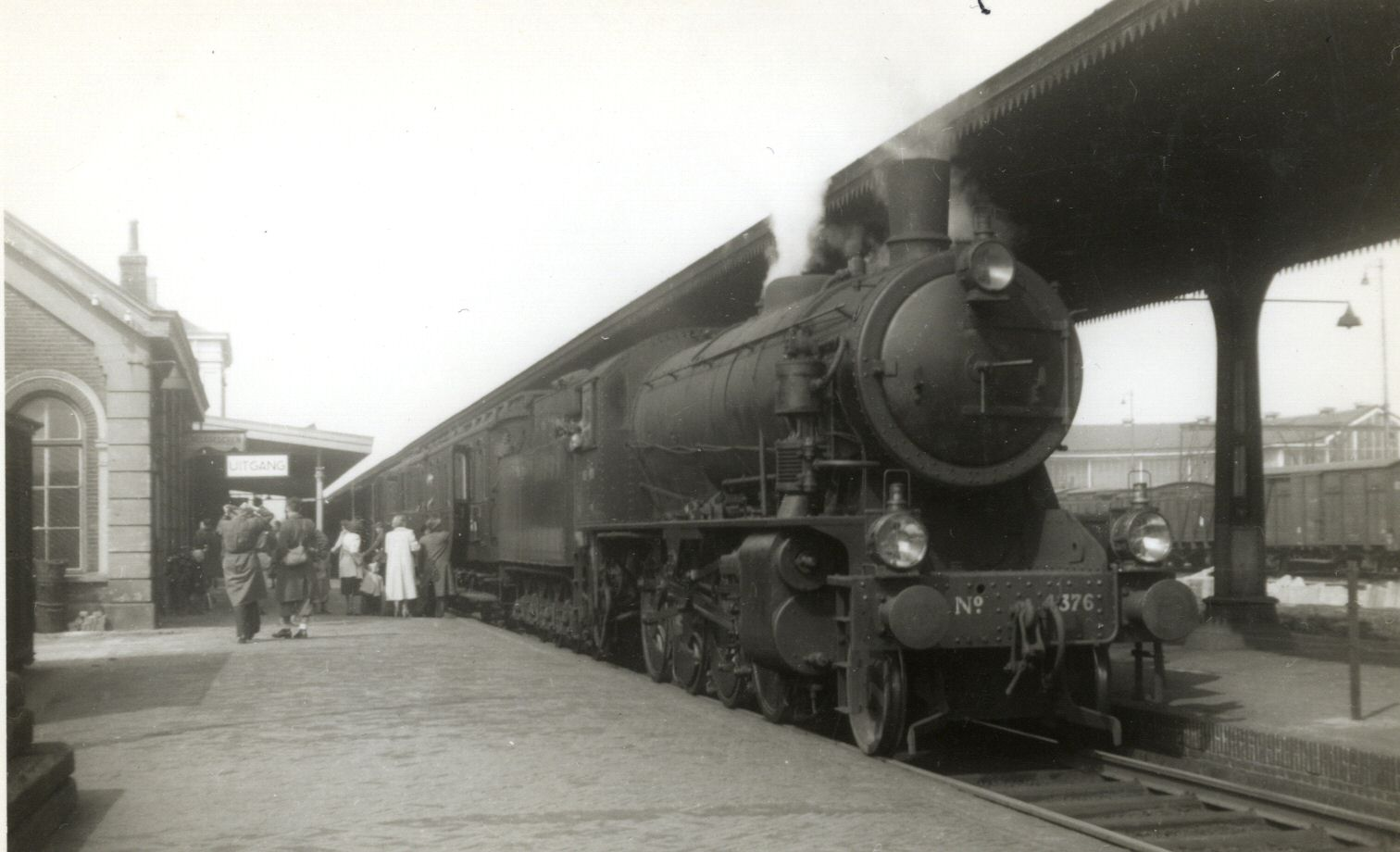
Locomotive NS 4376 of the series 4300 ("Austerities", ex-WD 77495) at the NS station of Tilburg.

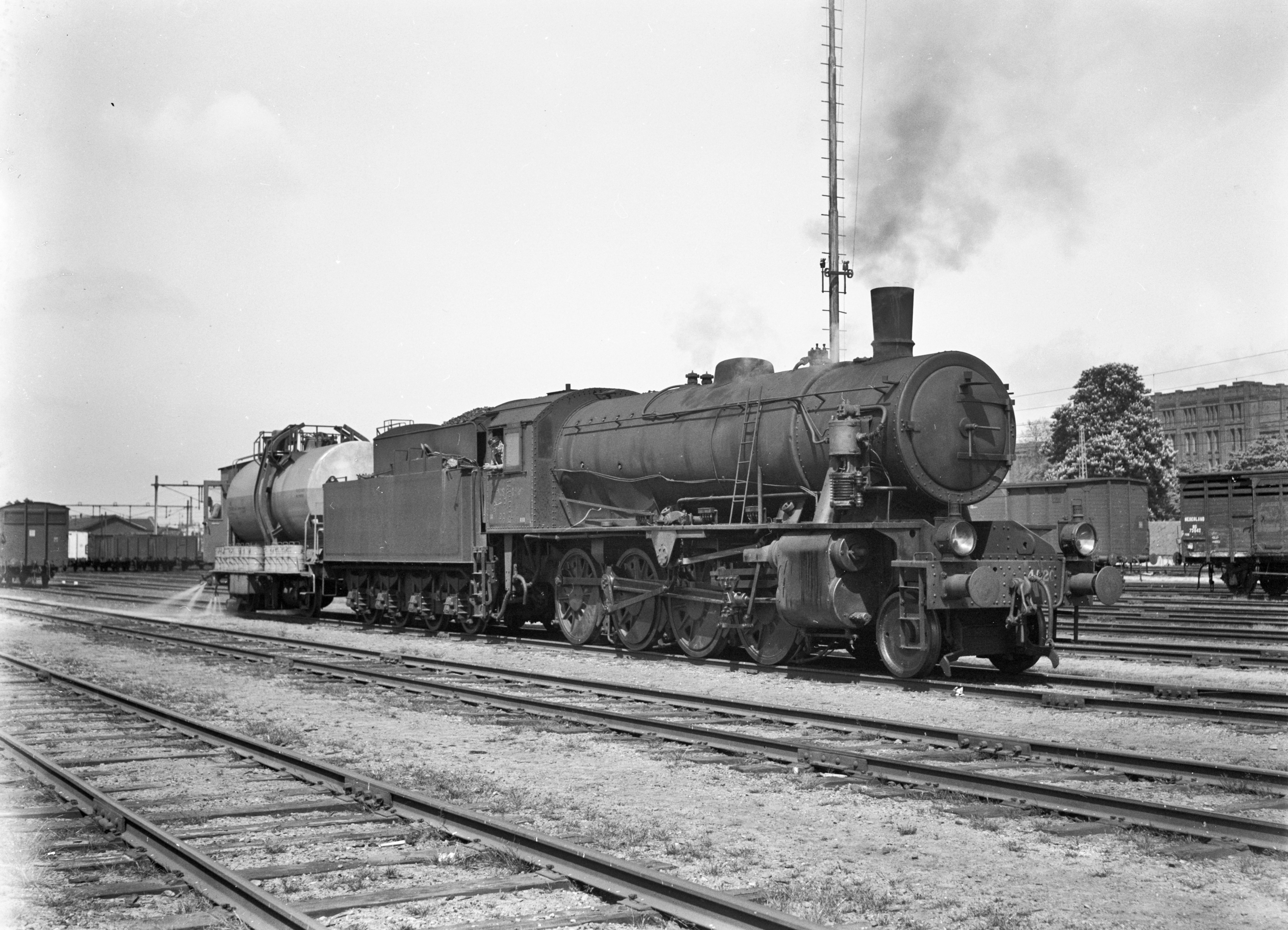
Locomotive from the series 4300 - NS 4520 ("Austerities", ex-WD) of the N.S. with a spray truck of the weed control train (spray train) in Utrecht.

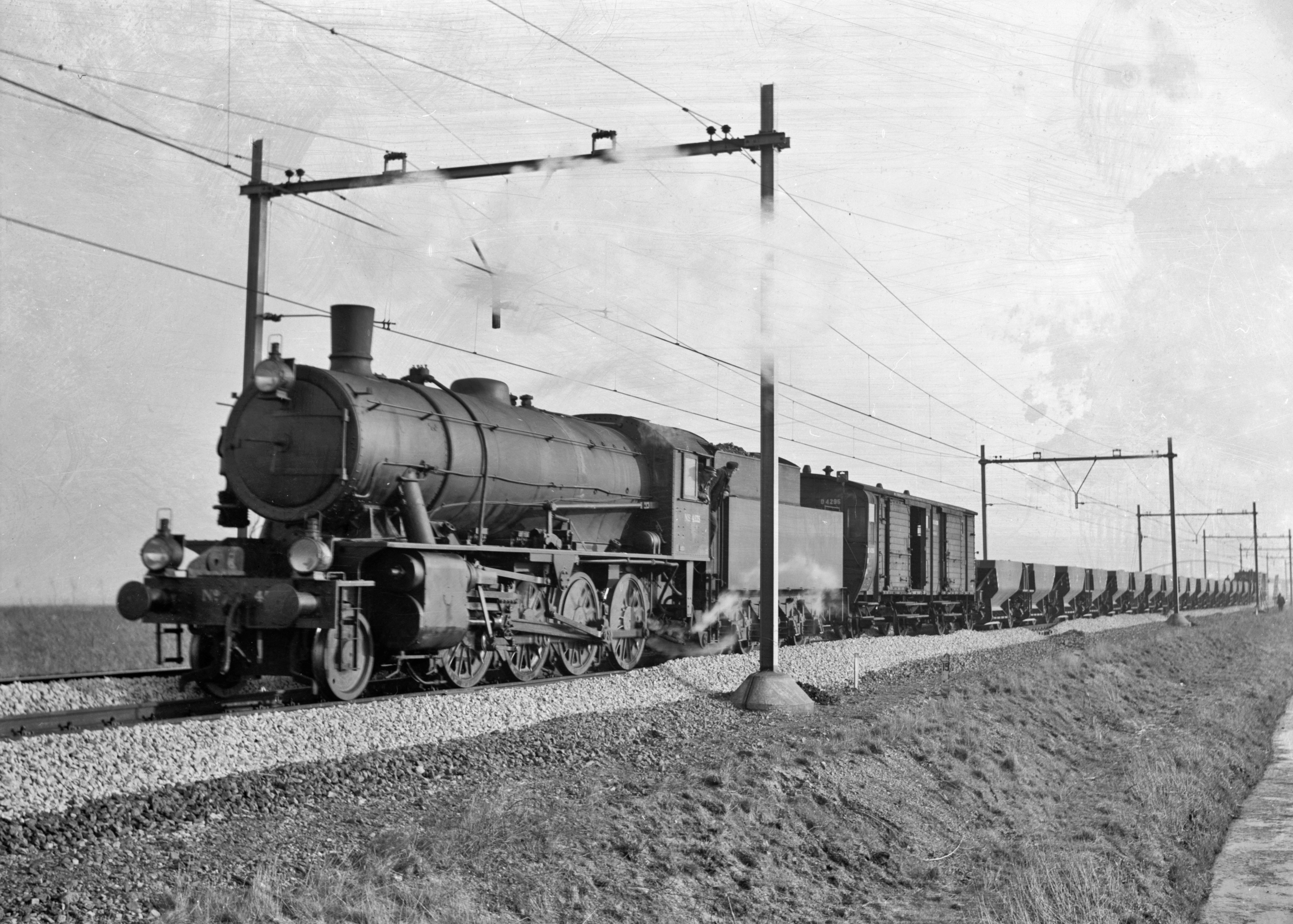
Locomotive NS 4535 (series 4300 "Austerities", ex-WD 77188) with a train consisting of unloaders with gravel (ballast) for the track reinforcement between Amsterdam and Utrecht.

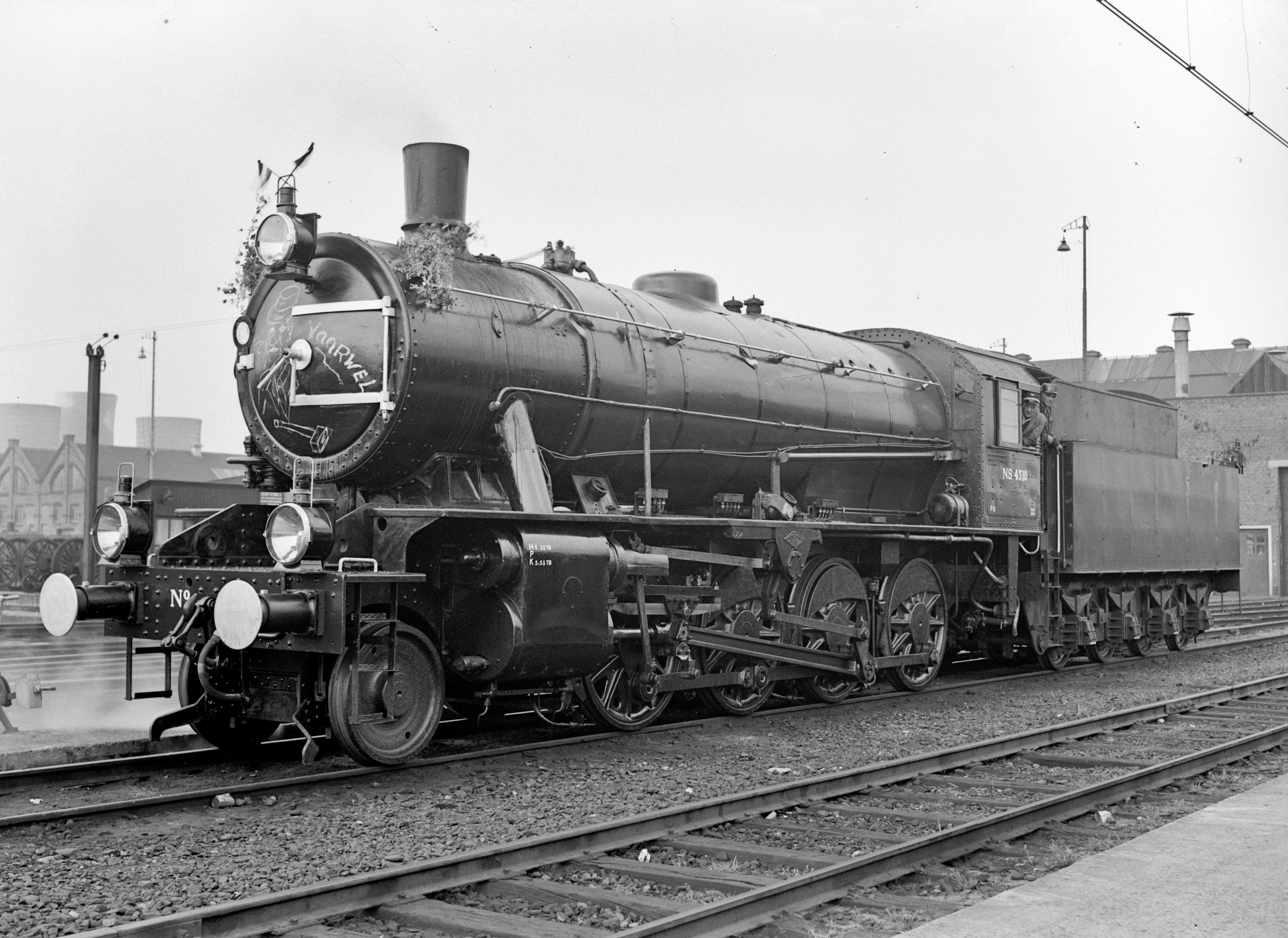
Locomotive NS 4310 (series 4300 "Austerities", ex-WD 70863) at the central workshop in Tilburg, with decorations due to the fact that this was the last steam locomotive to be overhauled in the workshop in Tilburg.

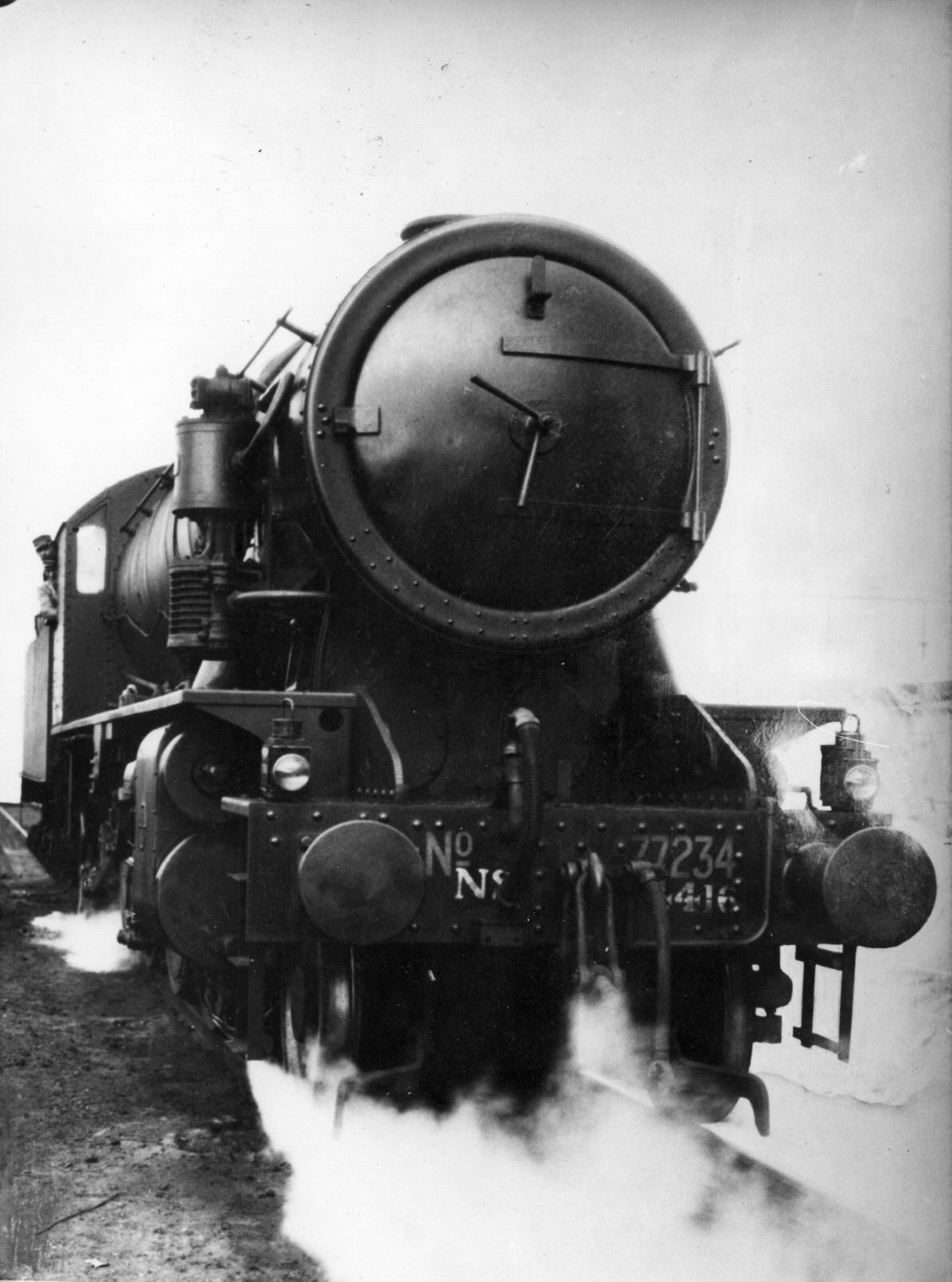
Steam locomotive no. 4416 of the N.S, ex War Department no. 77234. (Between 1945 - 1946)

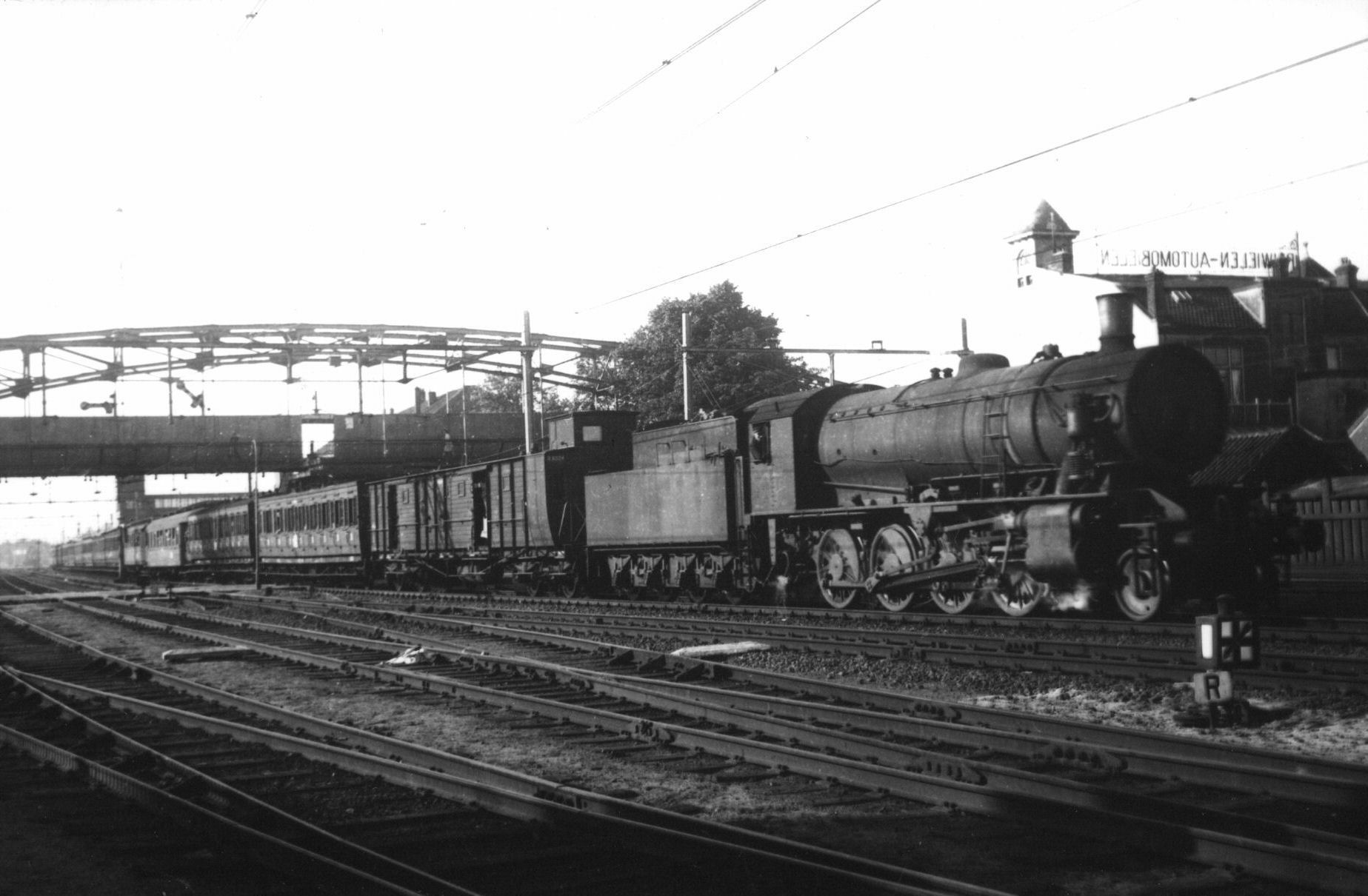
Steam locomotive from the series 4300 of the N.S. with a passenger train in Hilversum. (Between 1945 - 1955)

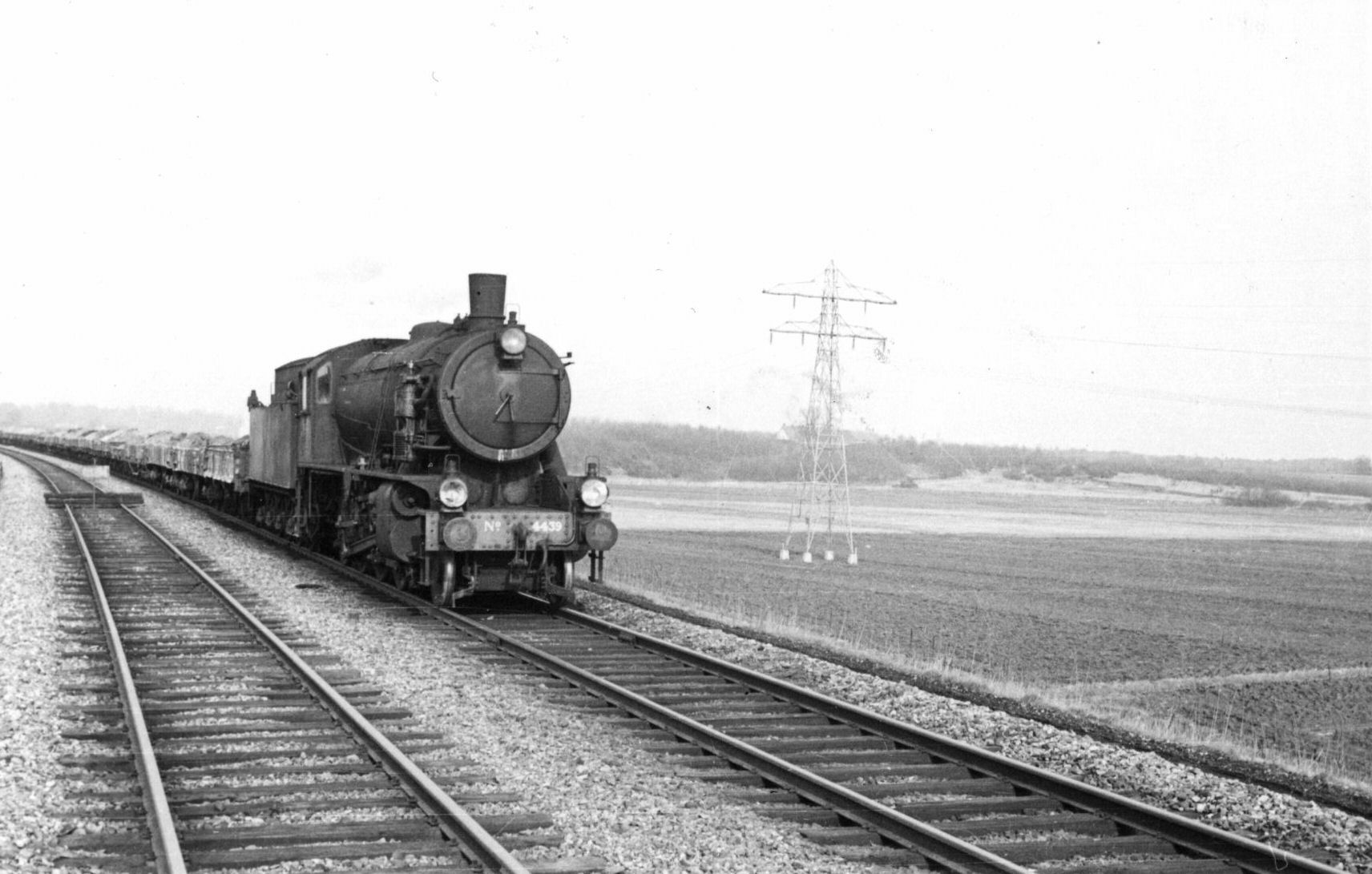
Steam locomotive NS 4439 with a sand train. (Between 1945 - 1950)

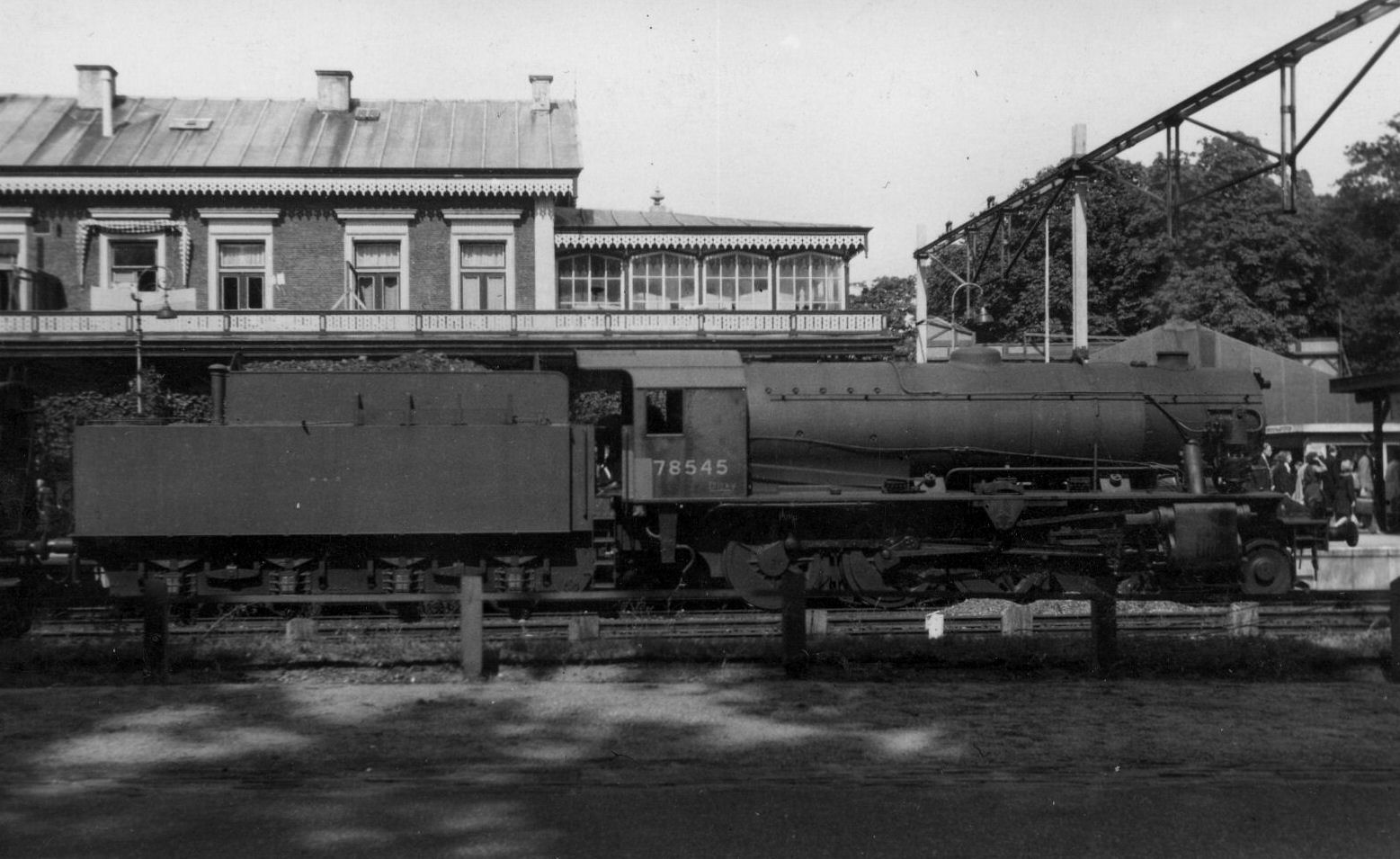
Steam locomotive NS 4445 (ex War Department no. 78545) station Baarn. (August 1945)

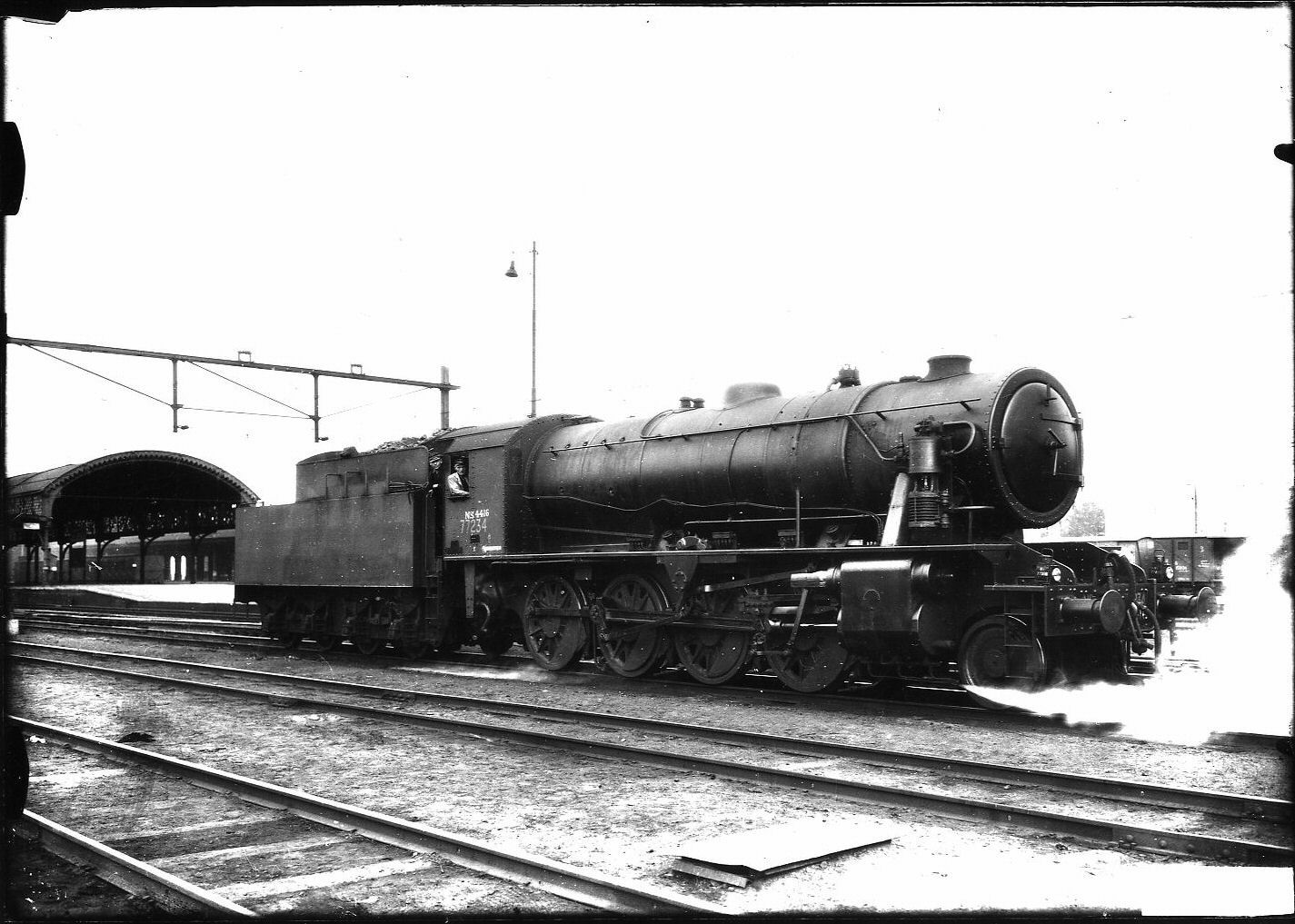
Steam locomotive NS 4416 (ex War Department no. 77234) in Utrecht. (Between 1945 - 1946)

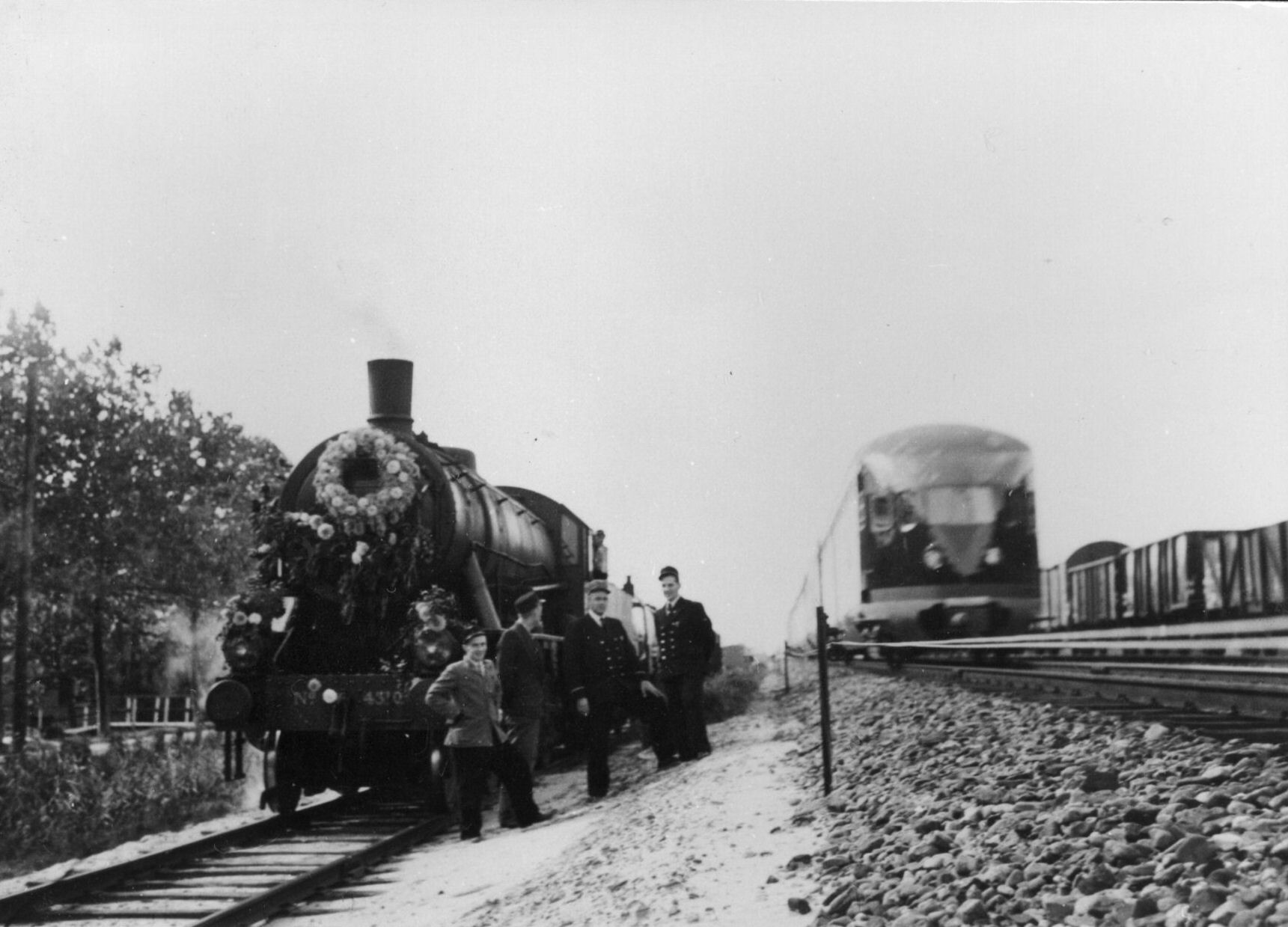
A group of railwaymen at the decorated steam locomotive NS 4310 (ex War Department no. 70863), presumably in Gorinchem or Giessendam, during the farewell of this steam locomotive (depot Rotterdam RMO). A diesel-electric train set DE 3 (series 11-50) passes on the right. (28-09-1957)

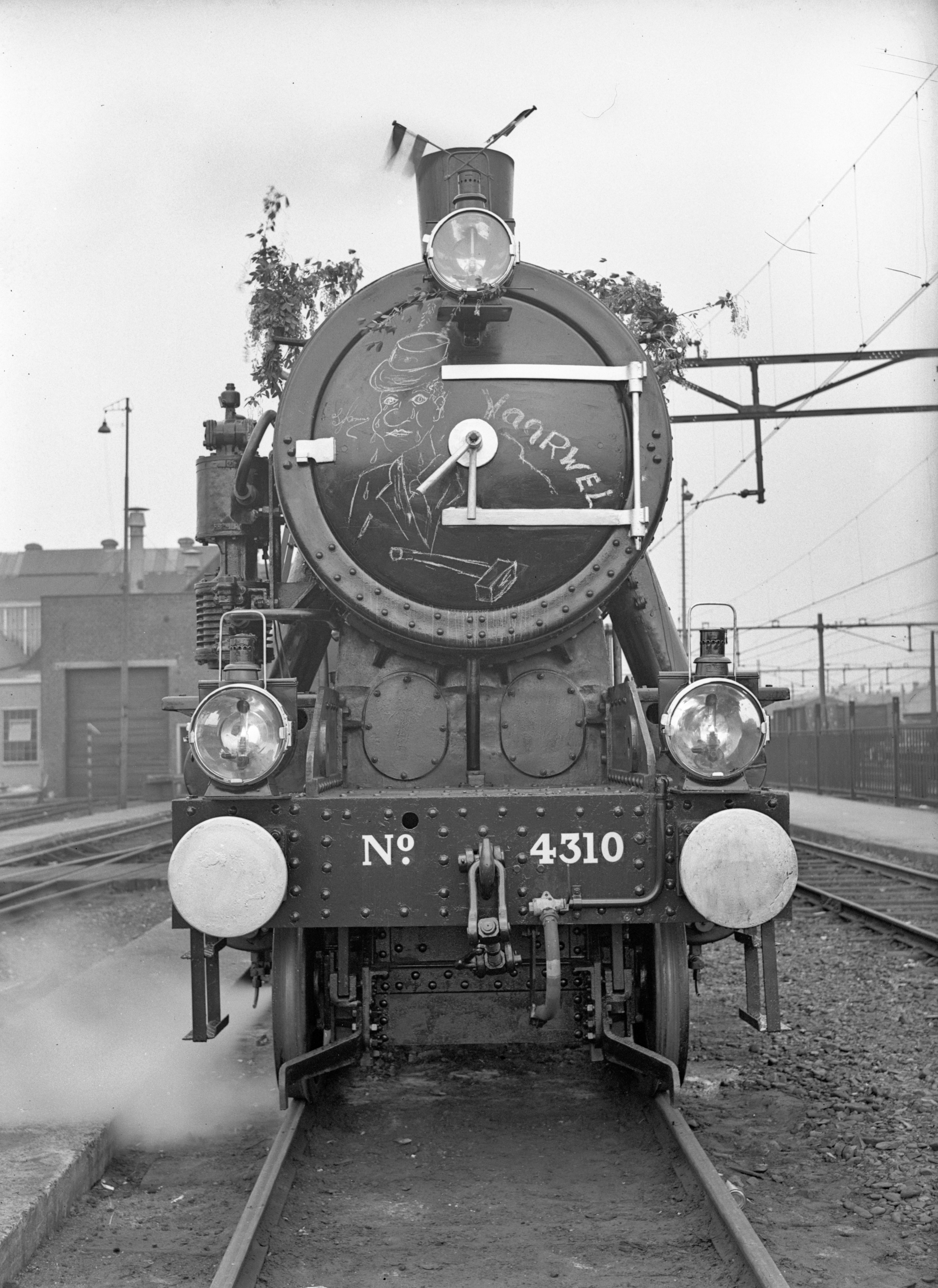
Steam locomotive NS 4310 (ex War Department no. 70863) at the central workshop in Tilburg, with decorations due to the fact that this was the last steam locomotive to be overhauled in the workshop in Tilburg. (07-06-1955)

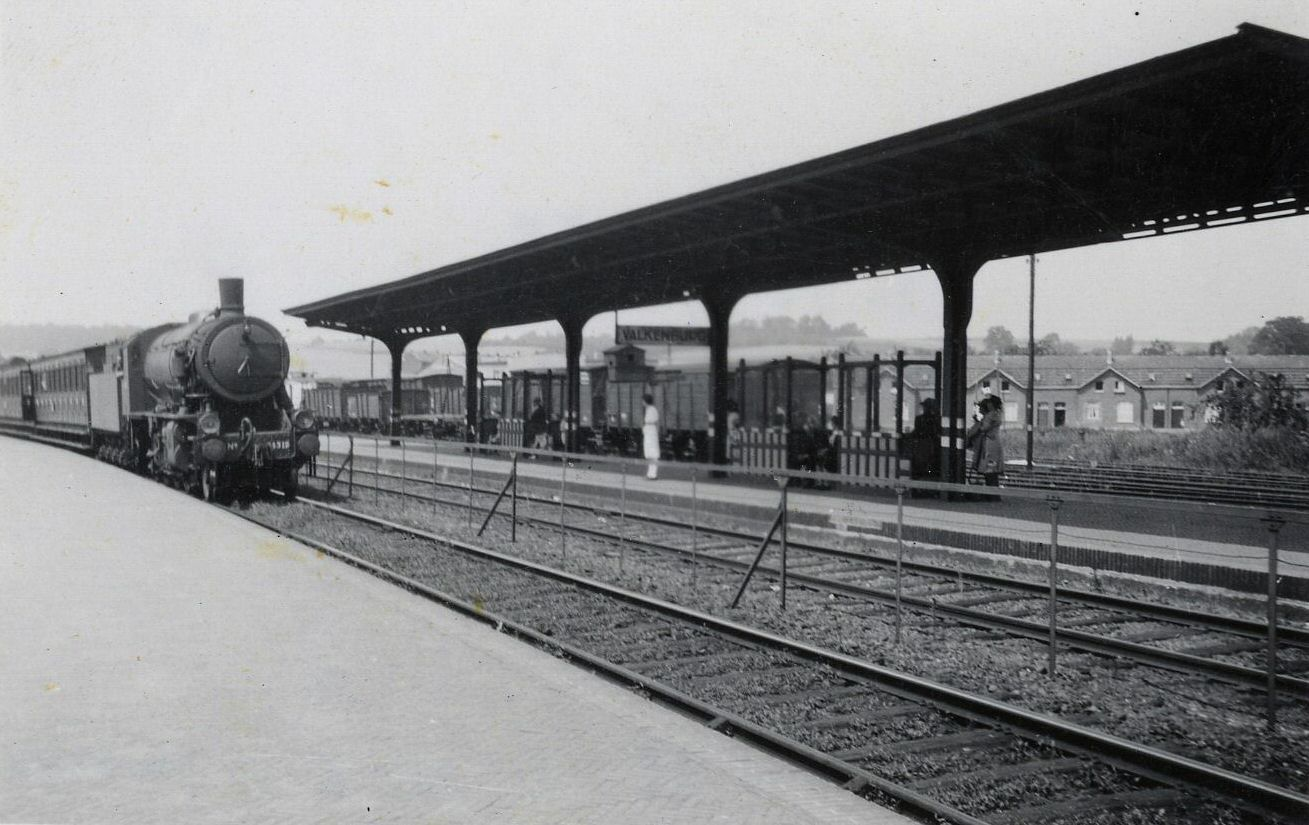
View of the second platform of the N.S. station in Valkenburg. with a train approaching train on the left pulled by the steam locomotive NS 4312 (ex War Department). (03-07-1947)

== Sources and references ==
- Waldorp, H. (1981). Onze Nederlandse stoomlocomotieven in woord en beeld. Alkmaar: De Alk. pp. 21–22. ISBN 90-6013-909-7.
- "Het Utrechts archief".

== See also ==
- WD Austerity 2-8-0
