= British logistics in the Siegfried Line campaign =

Aspect of World War II

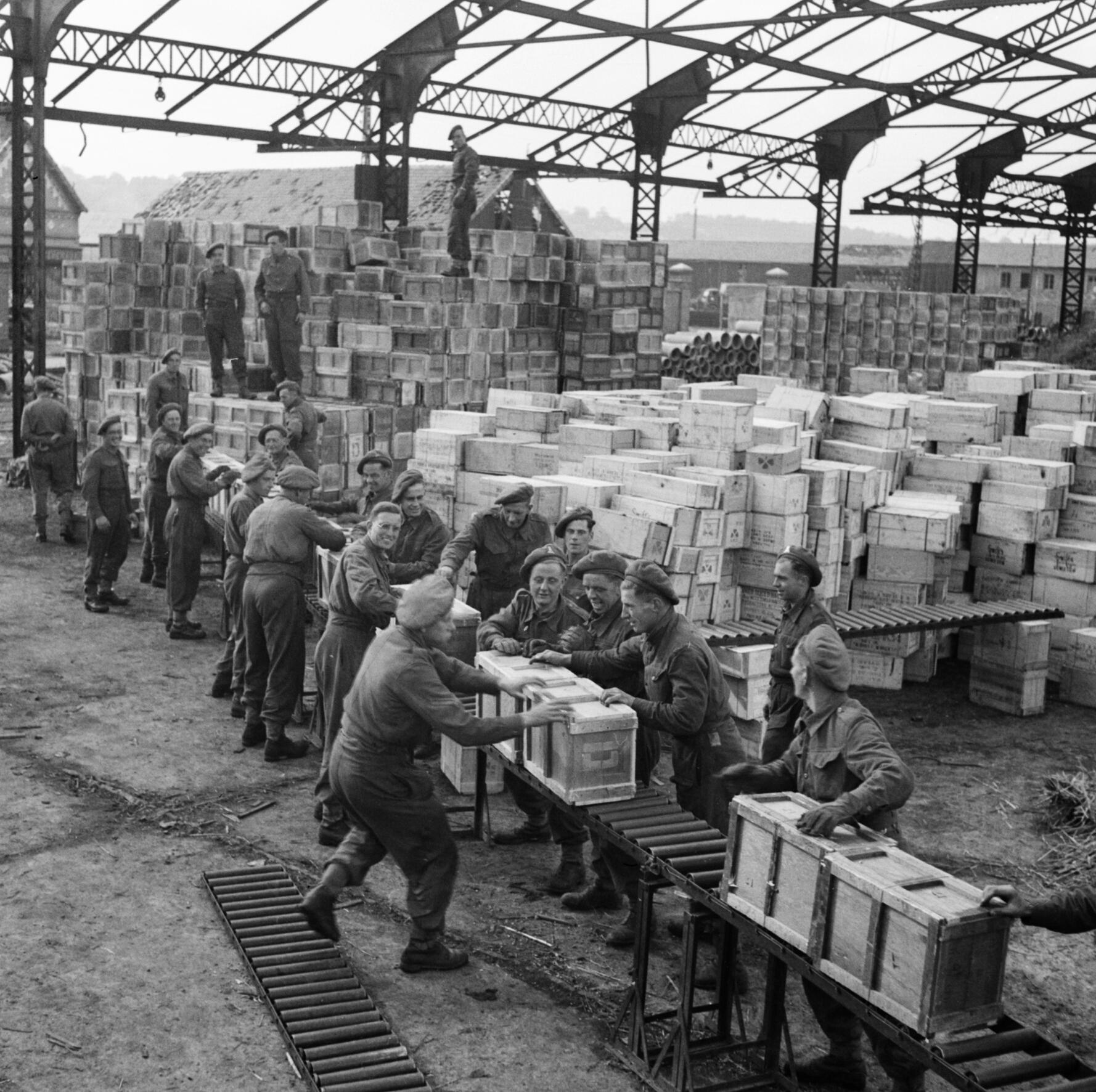
Royal Army Service Corps troops stack ration boxes in the harbour at Dieppe on 14 October 1944

British logistics supported the Anglo-Canadian 21st Army Group operations in the World War II Siegfried Line campaign, which ran from the end of the pursuit of the German armies from Normandy in mid-September 1944 until the end of January 1945. Operation Overlord, the Allied landings in Normandy, commenced on D-Day, 6 June 1944. German resistance was stubborn, and the British and Canadian advance much slower than planned until the German defences were finally breached in July. What followed was a far more rapid advance than anticipated. The British Second Army liberated Brussels on 3 September, but the subsequent effort to cross the Rhine with the aid of airborne forces in Operation Market Garden was unsuccessful. The Canadian First Army had the task of clearing the Channel Coast. Although the port of Antwerp had been captured virtually intact on 4 September, major operations were required to clear the German defenders from the Scheldt estuary, and it was not opened for shipping until 26 November. Antwerp had sufficient capacity to support both the British and American forces, but its use was hampered by German V-weapon attacks.

A new base was developed around Brussels, and an advanced base area around Antwerp. It was decided to shut down the Rear Maintenance Area (RMA) in Normandy, where some 300,000 long tons (300,000 t) of supplies were still held. This included 15,000,000 rations, which were gradually eaten by the troops in the RMA. Stores still required by the 21st Army Group were moved forward to the new advanced base, and the rest returned to the War Office for disposal. To get the railway system in operation again required the reconstruction of bridges and the importation of additional locomotives. Petrol was brought in tankers and over the Operation Pluto pipeline. Civilian labour was utilised at the bases in a variety of tasks to enable military personnel to be released for service in forward areas. By the end of 1944, some 90,000 civilians were employed by the 21st Army Group, of whom half were employed in workshops in the advanced base, and 14,000 at the port of Antwerp.

British logistics in this campaign had access to enormous resources. The problem the administrative staffs faced was not whether something could be accomplished, but how soon it could be done. Procedures had already been developed and honed in earlier campaigns, and were improved upon as administrative staffs steadily became more experienced. The maintenance system had both capacity and flexibility, and was capable of supporting both fast-moving and slow-tempo operations.

== Background ==
In the first weeks after the Allied invasion of Normandy, known as Operation Overlord, commenced on D-Day, 6 June 1944, the Anglo-Canadian forces were maintained over the Gold, Juno and Sword Beaches, and the small ports of Port-en-Bessin and Courseulles. Construction of the artificial Mulberry harbour commenced on 7 June and by 16 June it was handling 2,000 long tons (2,000 t) per day. The Mulberry accounted for about 12.5 per cent of the Allied tonnage landed in June, compared to 25 per cent for Cherbourg and the small ports, and 62.5 per cent over the beaches, the capacity of which had been underestimated in the planning phase. German resistance was stubborn, and casualties were heavy, although neither as high as anticipated, nor as great as those suffered by the American forces. The bulk of the German forces were drawn towards the British sector, with the result that the advance was much slower than planned, and the lodgement area was considerably smaller. By the end of July, the chances of capturing the Seine ports any time soon looked slim, and work commenced on winterisation of the Mulberry harbour, building up stocks to cater for deteriorating weather, developing the ports and Caen and Ouistreham, and opening the Canal de Caen à la Mer which ran between them.

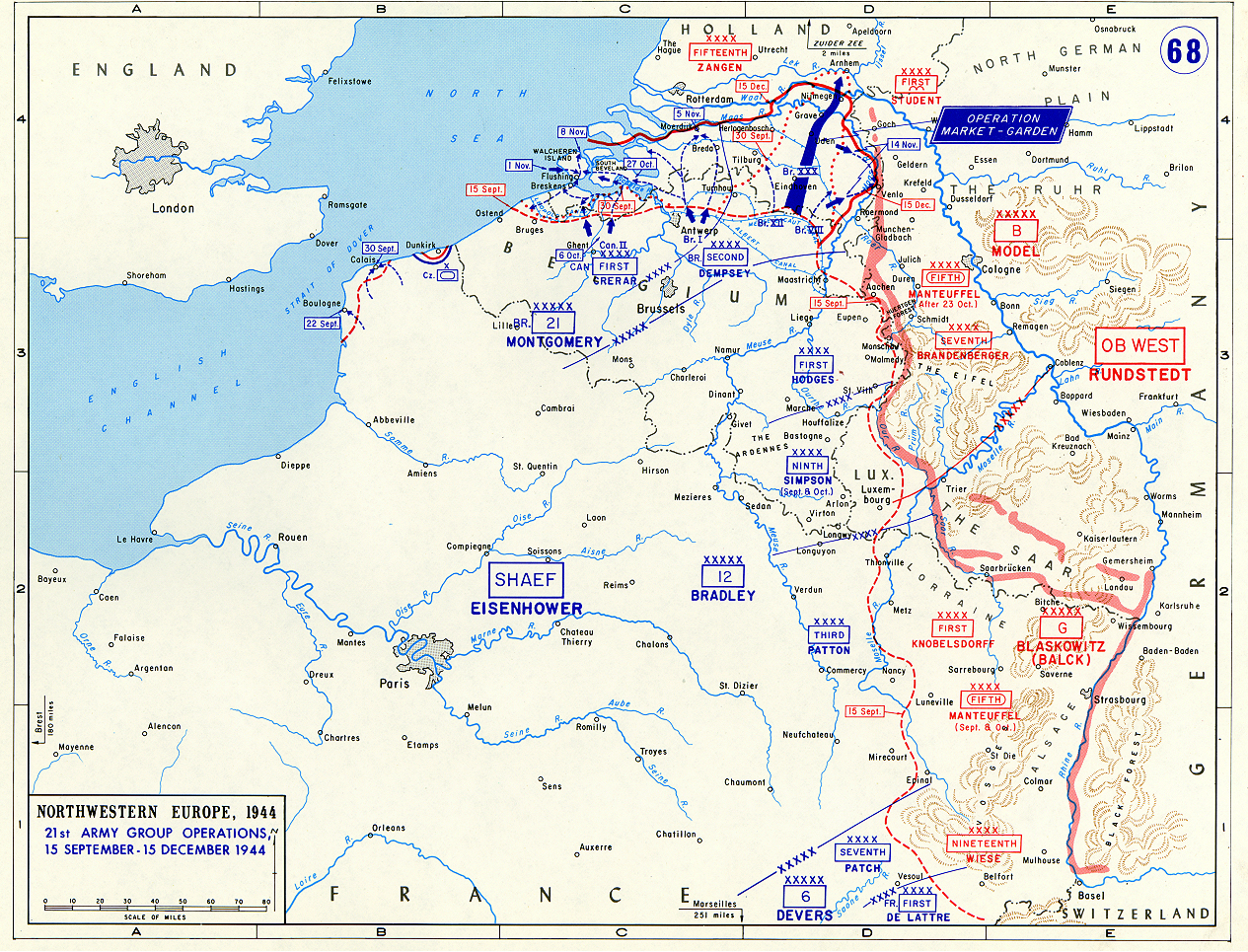
21st Army Group Operations, 15 September to 15 December 1944

At the same time, preparations were also made for the possibility of a sudden breach of the German defences requiring a rapid exploitation. When the American Operation Cobra, launched on 25 July 1944, succeeded in breaking through the German defences, six additional transport companies were shipped from the United Kingdom. Plans were drawn up to establish an advanced base in the Le Havre area on the assumption that the Germans would try to establish a new front along the Somme. In the event, the advance proceeded further and faster than anticipated. The British Second Army's XXX Corps crossed the Seine at Vernon on 25 August, followed by the XII Corps at Les Andelys two days later, and both corps were across the Somme by 1 September.

To facilitate the advance, the transport of VIII Corps was appropriated, as was most of that normally assigned to working the beaches and ports. To permit this, the tonnage being shipped from the UK to France was reduced from 16,000 to 7,000 long tons (16,300 to 7,100 t) per day; the difference being made up by drawing down stocks held in the Rear Maintenance Area (RMA) in Normandy. Along with the new units from the UK, these steps increased the number of transport units available to the Second Army from 6 to 39 companies. Until a new army roadhead could be established, supplies were stocked forward as far as possible, at interim depot areas known as "cushions". Brussels was liberated on 3 September, and Antwerp was captured virtually intact on 4 September, but it could not be used as a port until the Germans were cleared from the Scheldt approaches, through which ships had to pass to reach the port.

Meanwhile, the Canadian First Army's II Corps had crossed the Seine in the Pont-de-l'Arche area on 27 August, whilst British I Corps forced a crossing three days later. At this time there were no bridges over the Seine between Rouen and the sea, and no intact ones upstream as far as Paris partly due to Royal Air Force (RAF) attacks. A 6-knot (11 km/h) tidal bore ran twice a day, giving a tide range of 8 feet (2.4 m). This precluded the use of pontoon bridges, and restricted the times when DUKWs (amphibious trucks) and ferries could operate. Unlike the British corps, the II Canadian Corps did not operate a field maintenance centre (FMC), so supplies were drawn from No. 3 Army Roadhead at Lisieux, which opened on 26 August, or from No. 3A Army Roadhead at Elbeuf, which was opened on 2 September. The First Canadian Army opened No. 5 Army Roadhead between Dieppe and Abbeville on 3 September, and No. 7 Army Roadhead in the Bethune area on 15 September. The lack of FMCs was compensated for to some extent by the creation of temporary "kangaroo dumps" that were established in forward areas to support the advance. The Canadian roadheads could not be satisfactorily stocked in August or September as Second Army had priority for supplies. These were however plentiful in the main depots at No. 1 Roadhead in the RMA, but this was now up to 300 miles (480 km) behind the front lines.

== Organisation ==
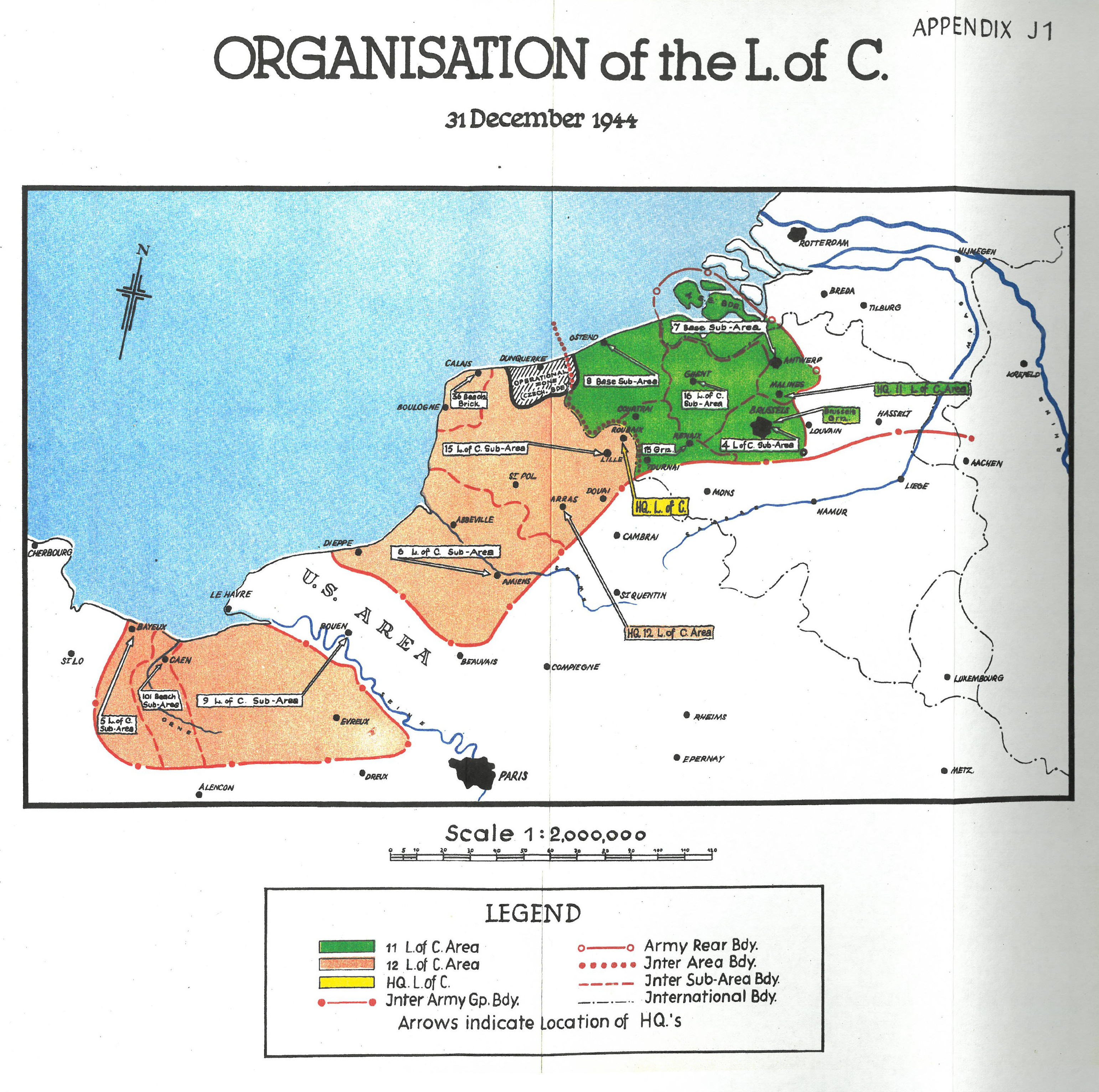
Organisation of the Line of Communications – December 1944

On 1 September, the Supreme Allied Commander, American General Dwight D. Eisenhower, assumed personal command of the ground forces from Field Marshal Sir Bernard Montgomery. Supreme Headquarters Allied Expeditionary Force (SHAEF) now vetted and approved requirements for some items, such as coal, and passed them on to the War Office for action. Montgomery remained the commander of the 21st Army Group, which consisted of Lieutenant-General Miles Dempsey's British Second Army and Lieutenant-General Harry Crerar's Canadian First Army. The ration strength of the 21st Army Group, which included RAF personnel and Axis prisoners of war (POWs), was about 450,000. Under the British command arrangement, Montgomery was in charge of his own logistics, but in the American forces logistics was the responsibility of Lieutenant General John C. H. Lee's Communications Zone, an entirely separate command from Lieutenant General Omar N. Bradley's US 12th Army Group. Bradley made no secret of his preference for the British system.

Montgomery considered administration to be one of the principles of war. His biographer Reginald William Thompson described him as being more of a general manager than a general, one who was "enslaved by logistics". Montgomery seldom launched an attack until the required administrative preparations were in place and an adequate supply of ammunition was on hand. As a result, he sometimes passed up enticing operational opportunities. Senior American commanders were more willing to subordinate logistical considerations to operational ones.

The main headquarters (HQ) of the 21st Army Group moved to the Residence Palace in Brussels, a move that was completed on 23 September. It was followed by the rear HQ the following week. The 7th and 8th Base Sub Areas administered Antwerp and Ostend respectively under the command of the Canadian First Army, and the 4th Line of Communications Sub Area administered Brussels under the British Second Army. In September, the control of these sub areas passed to the HQ of Lines of Communication. At the start of October the 4th Line of Communications Sub Area handed Brussels over to No. 10 Garrison and assumed responsibility for the 21st Army Group roadhead around Diest. A new HQ, the 16th Line of Communications Sub Area was formed, and took over the administration of bases and depots in the Somme Department on 29 September. In November it moved to Belgium and took over the administration of the port of Ghent. To control the port of Boulogne, the HQ of the 36th Beach Brick moved up from the RMA. The HQ of Lines of Communication, under the command of Major-General R. F. B. Naylor, initially established itself at Malines in September, but moved to Roubaix on the French-Belgian border, a more central location, in December. The 11th Line of Communications Area then assumed control of the advanced base in Belgium, while the 12th Line of Communications Area moved from Cherbourg to Amiens and took charge of the bases and depots in France, including those of the RMA.

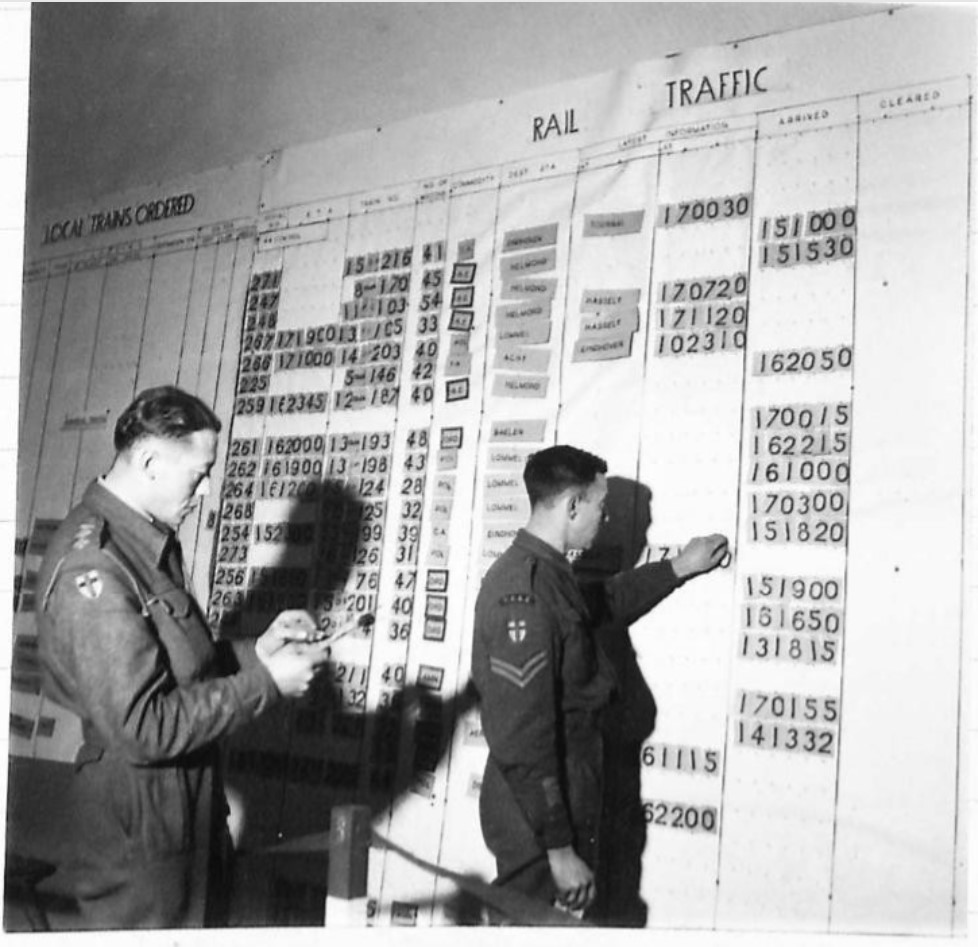
The administration post at No. 8 Army Roadhead.

The Canadian Army did not have the manpower to manage its own line of communications, so it shared that of the British. A Canadian administrative section known as the Canadian Section, 1st Echelon Headquarters, 21st Army Group, was attached to the rear HQ of 21st Army Group. Its main role was relieving the Canadian First Army of responsibility for non-operational administrative functions. It was headed by Brigadier A. W. Beament, who was succeeded by Major-General E. L. M. Burns in December 1944. The War Office agreed that he should have direct access to the Commander-in-Chief of the 21st Army Group whenever required, but in practice this was seldom exercised, with matters requiring Montgomery's attention being dealt with by Crerar.

In addition to the Canadians, the 21st Army Group also included the 1st Belgian Infantry Brigade, the Dutch Princess Irene Brigade, 1st Polish Armoured Division, the 1st Czechoslovak Armoured Brigade and French contingents. A legal framework for military cooperation was provided by the British Allied Forces Act 1940, and agreements were signed with the governments in exile of France and Poland in 1939 and 1940, and those of Czechoslovakia, Belgium, Norway and the Netherlands in 1941. Although these contingents were organised according to British establishments, and equipped the same as British Army units, simplifying logistics to some extent, linguistic differences remained a complicating factor.

Construction of a new advanced base at Brussels commenced on 6 October. No. 6 Army Roadhead was established there, and logistical units began moving in. Most were not self-contained with respect to the supply of fuel or rations, and became a drain on Second Army's resources. So too was the administration of civil affairs in the city; Headquarters Second Army Troops was fully occupied organising the roadhead, and the only other available HQ, that of No. 10 Garrison, was neither staffed nor equipped for the task. The location of the roadhead site on the western side of Brussels was dictated by the layout of the railways, but the disadvantage of this was that it required the corps' transport to traverse Brussels' narrow and congested streets.

An army roadhead normally controlled two base supply depots (BSDs), four detail issuing depots (DIDs), five petrol depots and four mobile field bakeries. Together, the two BSDs held five days' supplies for the army. Depending on the roadhead, one might serve two corps and the other one corps and the army troops, or they might issue stores on alternating days. The DIDs handled the provisioning of local units, including RAF units; the reception and loading of lorries and trains; the handling of coal, fresh meat and vegetables; and assisting the BSDs. The mobile field bakeries baked up to 44,000 rations of bread per day, the bread ration being 12 ounces (340 g). The petrol depots were grouped under a Commander Royal Army Service Corps (CRASC), Petrol Installations. There were two type B petrol depots and three type C petrol depots. The former consisted of two officers and 36 other ranks, and were equipped with two 6-ton tractors and two 6-ton trailers; the latter were smaller, with only two officers and 22 other ranks. About 26,000 long tons (26,000 t) of packaged fuel was held at the roadhead. If the pipehead was close by, there would also be an average of three mobile petrol filling centres.

The FMCs had a war establishment that included a control centre, but the army roadheads had to be laid out and controlled by a superior headquarters. Before the campaign began, it had been assumed that HQ Second Army Troops would be able to carry out this task, but after operations commenced it was found that the enormous number of army troops units meant this HQ was fully occupied in their administration, and it did not have the resources to control an army roadhead as well. The army roadhead was therefore controlled by HQ Second Army, but this raised a concern as to what would happen if Second Army Rear HQ could not be co-located with the roadhead, but moved forward to join Second Army Main HQ. A supervisory organisation was created called the Second Army administrative post. It was staffed with representatives of the Q (Movements), supply and transport, and labour branches. The administrative post worked in close cooperation with the movement control group, which managed the road and railways traffic in the Second Army area, and was normally co-located with it. An RASC transport column HQ and a pioneer group HQ were assigned to the roadhead to coordinate its clearance and depot work.

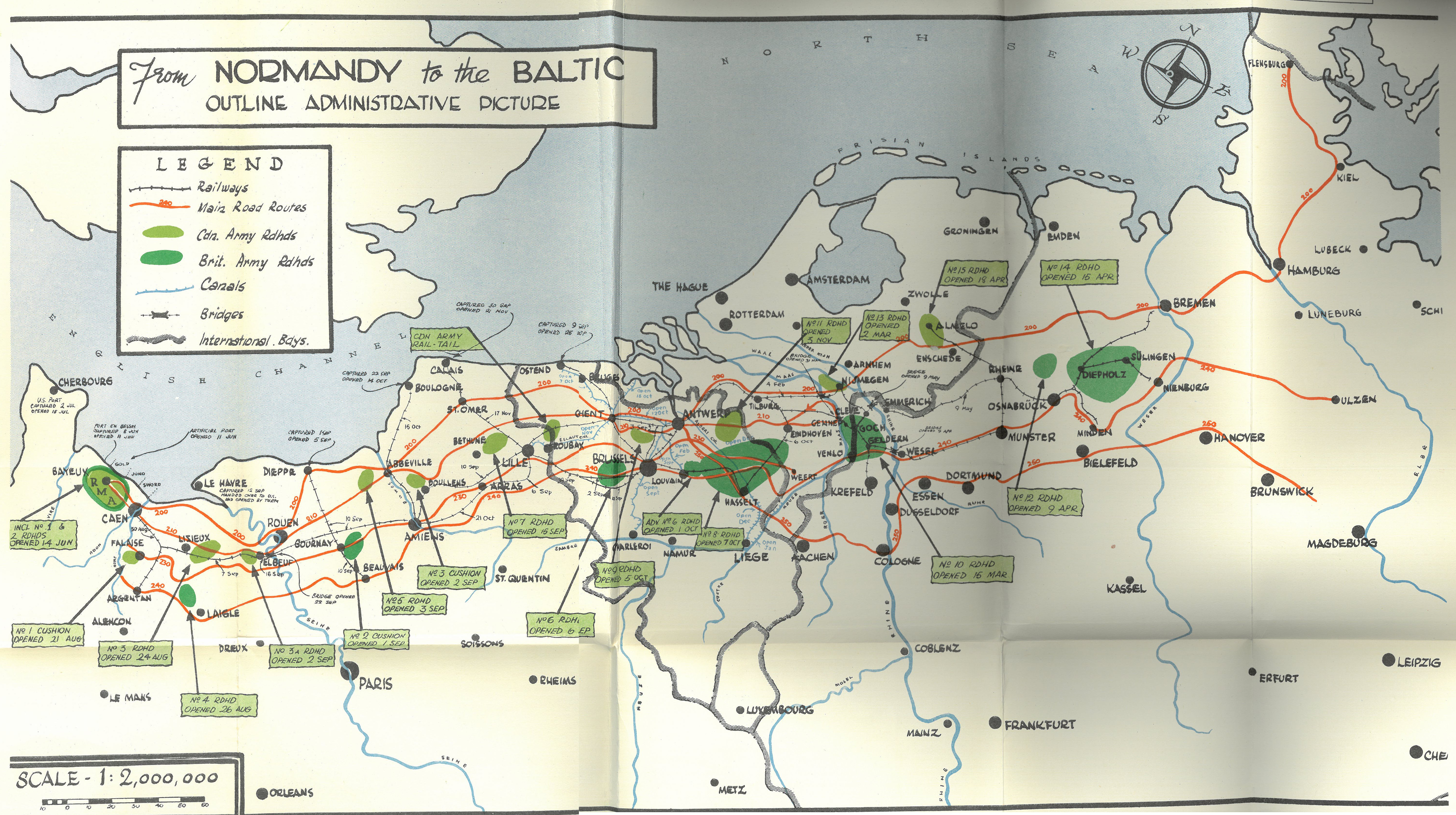
Location of the 21st Army Group roadheads

== Market Garden ==
=== Garden ===
While acknowledging the importance of securing ports, Eisenhower prioritised the advance on the Ruhr and Saar industrial regions. Montgomery proposed an advance on a narrow front, which Eisenhower rejected in favour of one on a broad front. Accordingly, Montgomery issued orders for an advance on the Ruhr, with Second Army crossing the Rhine with the aid of airborne troops, while the Canadian First Army was directed to capture Boulogne and Calais, and then commence operations aimed at opening Antwerp. The capture of Boulogne would facilitate Operation Pluto, the laying of pipelines across the English Channel to deliver petrol. It was calculated that the Channel ports of Le Havre, Dieppe, Boulogne, Dunkirk and Calais had sufficient capacity to support the proposed advance of the 21st Army Group all the way to Berlin. In a letter to The Times that was published on 24 February 1947, Major-General Miles Graham, the 21st Army Group's Chief Administrative Officer wrote:

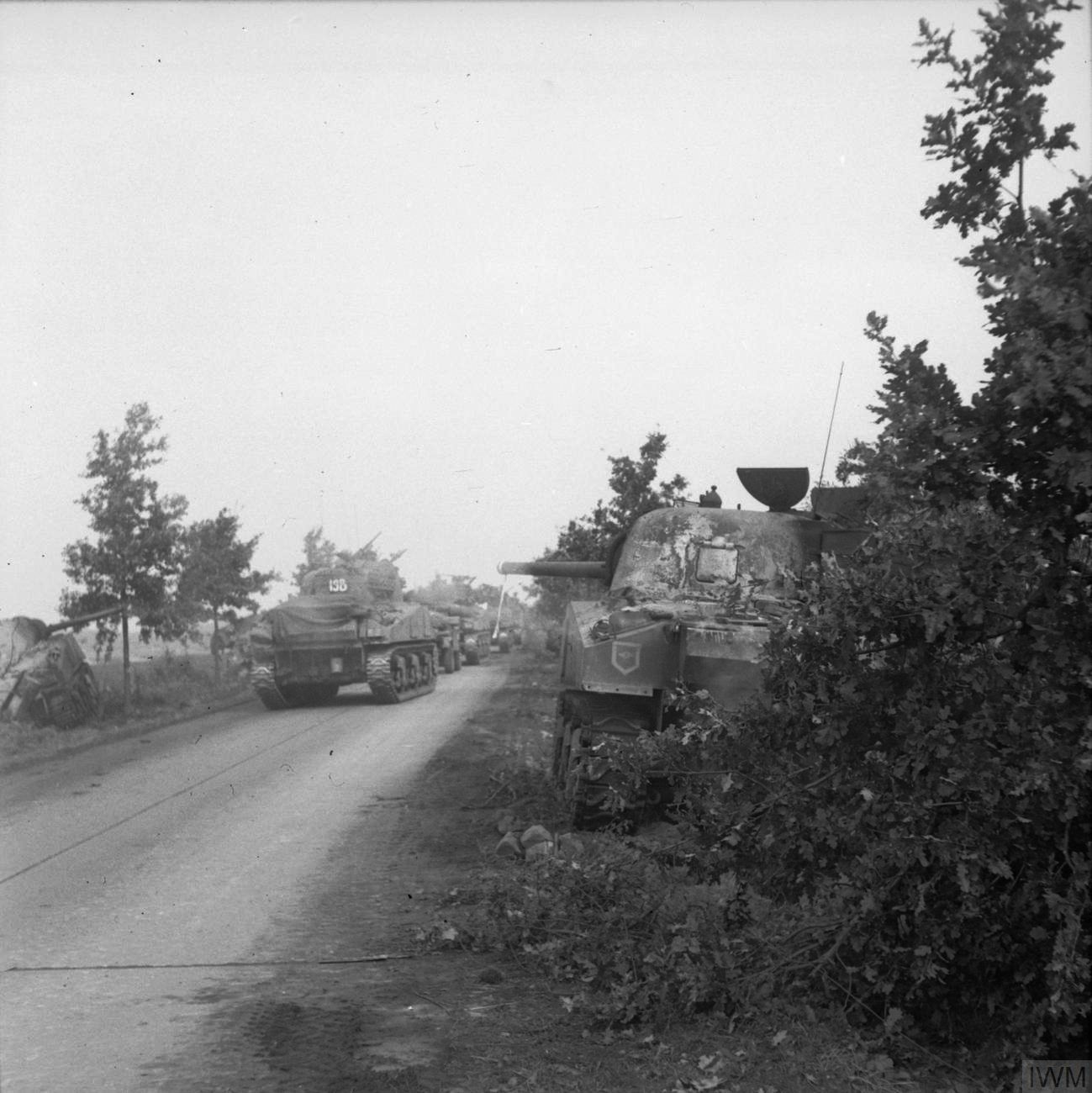
Sherman tanks of the Irish Guards pass others which were knocked out earlier in the operation on 17 September

I was quite confident at the time (nor would Field Marshal Montgomery have pressed his views unless he had been assured on this point) that a deep thrust to the heart of Germany was administratively feasible... I personally have no doubt from a purely administrative point of view that, based as we were on the Channel ports, it would have been possible to carry out successfully the operation which Field Marshal Montgomery desired.

Montgomery intended to outflank the Siegfried Line with an airborne operation codenamed Operation Market Garden, "Market" being the airborne part of the operation and "Garden" the ground part. The Siegfried Line, also known as the West Wall, was a 2-to-3-mile (3.2 to 4.8 km) deep belt of pillboxes, bunkers, trenches and gun positions, protected by barbed wire and anti-tank obstacles known as dragon's teeth, running along the German border. To support Operation Market Garden, XXX Corps established No. 161 FMC at Bourg-Leopold, which opened on 17 September, when the operation commenced. Until then, XXX Corps drew its supplies from No. 160 FMC in the Brussels area. It was intended that No. 162 FMC would be established at Arnhem after its capture, which was expected to occur by 20 September. This would support the troops operating north of the Rhine, including the British 1st Airborne Division and the Polish 1st Parachute Brigade. The forces operating south of the Rhine, including the US 82nd and 101st Airborne Divisions would continue to draw supplies from No. 161 FMC. The logistical units of the seaborne tail of the 1st Airborne Division followed the Guards Armoured Division, carrying additional ammunition and two days' supplies.

On 16 September, eight American truck companies began running between Bayeux and Brussels to build up stocks for the two American airborne divisions. Six of the companies were equipped with standard GMC CCKW 2½-ton 6×6 trucks, and two with 10-ton semi-trailers. This was known as the Red Lion; the companies that formed it were withdrawn from the more famous Red Ball Express route. The Red Lion ran until 18 October, and delivered 650 long tons (660 t) per day, for a total of 18,000 long tons (18,000 t). In addition, four US Army truck companies pre-loaded with American ammunition were to arrive on 18 September. The American divisions drew common items such as tyres from British stocks, but all their other supplies had to be drawn from the Communications Zone by the attached truck companies. In an emergency, American troops could use British rations. Emergency arrangements were made for the First Allied Airborne Army to deliver 150 long tons (150 t) of US supplies to the airfields around Brussels, which could then be moved forward by road.

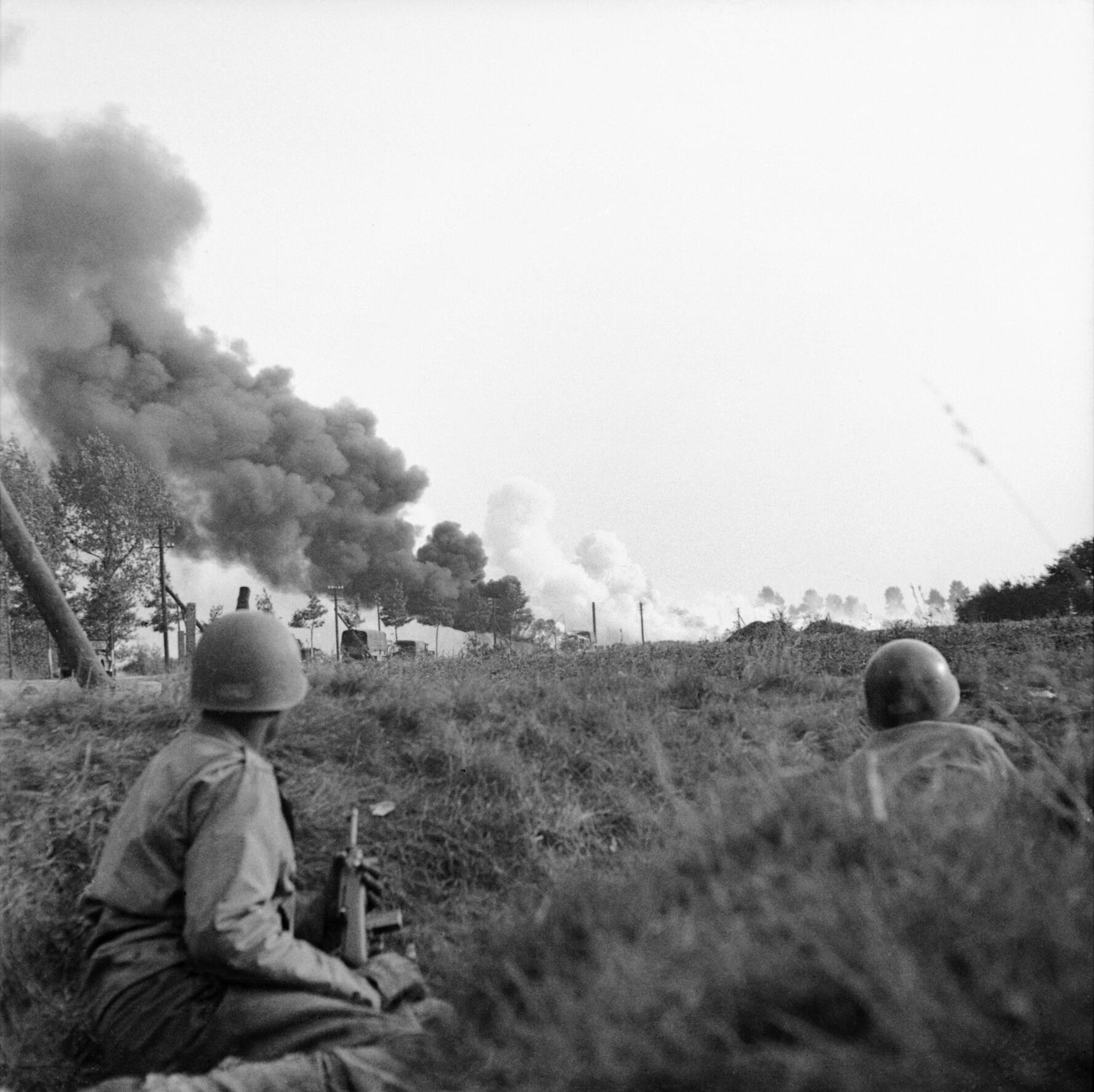
A convoy of Allied lorries under artillery and mortar fire on the road between Son and Eindhoven on 20 September 1944. Paratroops of the US 101st Airborne Division look on.

The ground divisions involved carried six days' maintenance supplies with them; the corps troops carried enough petrol for 150 miles (240 km), the Guards Armoured Division took enough for 200 miles (320 km), and the 43rd (Wessex) Infantry Division, 50th (Northumbrian) Infantry Division and 8th Armoured Brigade carried enough for 250 miles (400 km). These units carried double the usual holding of 25-pounder ammunition, which was drawn from No. 161 FMC before it opened for issues of other natures. Stocks of other kinds of ammunition held at No. 6 Army Roadhead were insufficient, so stocks held by 11th Armoured Division and 4th Armoured Brigade were handed over to the Guards Armoured Division and 8th Armoured Brigade respectively to make up the deficiencies. Some 110 long tons (110 t) of equipment peculiar to airborne units were landed at Bayeux, but a shortage of transport meant that little of it made it to the divisions in time. The tactical plan involved the movement of 20,000 vehicles along one road. To reduce traffic congestion, each division took only one brigade workshop with it. Breakdowns were pushed off the road for later recovery, whilst traffic along the road was one-way and by daylight only.

The decision to have each unit carry maintenance with it was vindicated; by 19 September operational traffic on the highway was so heavy that normal supply was impossible. No stocks could be moved to No. 162 FMC, as Arnhem had not been reached, so the effort was concentrated on stocking No. 161 FMC. The promised American truck companies arrived on 20 September, this being two days late. They were also under strength, and carried the wrong kind of 105 mm ammunition (for the standard M2 howitzer instead of the airborne M3 howitzer), and some trucks arrived empty. The two American divisions had no seaborne tails, so each was given twenty of the American trucks, and stores were issued by British FMC personnel and American troops from the truck companies. The transport situation was exacerbated by the loss of nearly thirty vehicles from the Guards Armoured Division in a Luftwaffe bombing raid on Eindhoven on the night of 20/21 September.

By 21 September, the plan to establish No. 162 FMC at Arnhem was abandoned, and it was decided to instead locate it near Grave. Four transport platoons carrying petrol, oil and lubricants (POL) and one hauling medium ammunition were despatched to the site, but only the one carrying ammunition got through before the road was cut by the Germans south of Veghel. The 101st Airborne Division was able to draw its supplies from No. 161 FMC, but the 82nd Airborne Division was cut off. Transport was ordered to cut their motors and wait for the road to be reopened rather than turn back. Since the corps troops had carried only four days' rations, they became dependent on the divisions until 162 FMC could be opened. Relief came when a major German supply dump was captured at Oss which provided XXX Corps with 120,000 rations per day, although tea, sugar and milk were lacking. The dump was so large that for a time both British and German units were drawing from it, until the 8th Armoured Brigade secured the site.

The 101st Airborne Division and the Guards Armoured Division managed to reopen the road by 15:30 on 23 September, although it was still under artillery and small arms fire, and blocks of ten vehicles were sent through every ten minutes. The four platoons carrying POL reached No. 162 FMC, followed by seven more carrying ammunition, but the road was cut again on 24 September, and not reopened until the morning of 26 September, by which time the entire operation had been called off, and what was left of 1st Airborne Division had been withdrawn during the night. Transport south of where the road was cut was used to build up stocks at No. 161 FMC.

=== Market ===
The airborne Operation Market commenced on 17 September. The troops carried 48 hours' supplies with them. Plans for air resupply were based on automatic resupply for four days, with the option to extend if required. On the second day, 18 September, only 35 Short Stirling aircraft were available to tow resupply gliders, but thereafter there would be sufficient Stirlings and Dakotas. British and American equipment was different, with only a few common items such as jeeps, 75mm Pack Howitzers, 6-pounder ant-tank guns and POL. Different equipment entailed different packing requirements. The US 82nd and 101st Airborne Divisions would place demands for supplies with US XVIII Airborne Corps while 1st Airborne Division dealt with I Airborne Corps (Rear) HQ, both of which were based back in England.

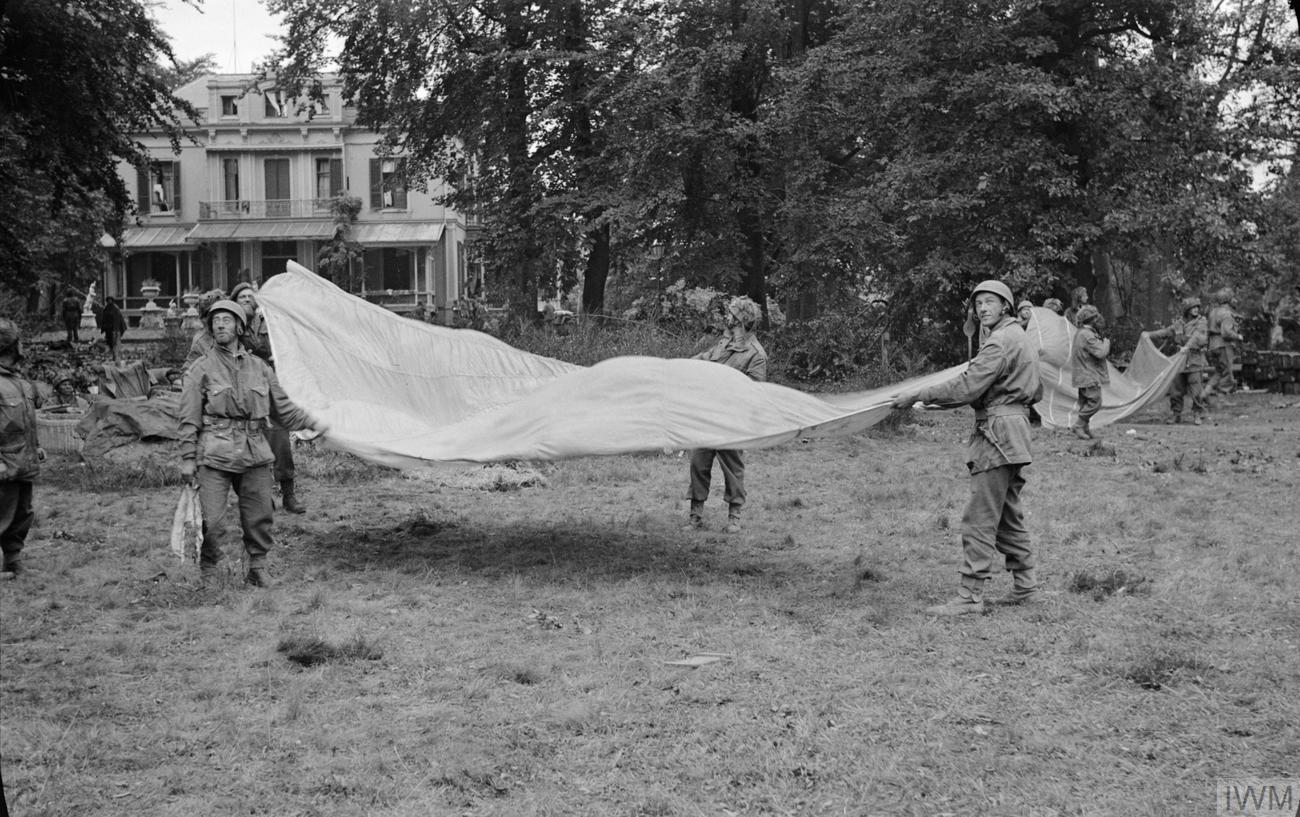
1st Airborne Division soldiers in front of the Hartenstein Hotel in Oosterbeek use yellow parachutes to signal to Allied supply aircraft on 23 September 1944

The second lift was supposed to depart the UK around 07:00 on 18 September, but was delayed for three hours by fog. Three General Aircraft Hamilcar gliders brought jeeps pre-loaded with ammunition and stores, but only two could be unloaded before German fire caused unloading work to cease. The divisional CRASC, Lieutenant Colonel Michael Packe arrived with his adjutant and nine soldiers, who would proceed to lay out the divisional administrative area (DAA) in front of the Hartenstein Hotel in Oosterbeek. The resupply drop that coincided with the second lift delivered most of its stores to the predetermined supply dropping point (SDP) north of the Wolfheze railway line, which was in German hands, but some supplies were collected and transported to the DAA in captured German vehicles. Although no POL was collected, petrol pumps were found 200 yards (180 m) east of the DAA, allowing units to draw 8 imperial gallons (36 L) per vehicle using their own jerricans.

The parachutes used for supply drops were coloured to indicate the contents of their attached containers and paniers: red for ammunition, white for medical supplies, green for rations, blue for POL, yellow for signals equipment, and black for mail. The first major resupply drop was on 19 September, which was made at the prearranged SDP despite efforts to communicate alternatives. The supply effort involved 99 Stirlings and 63 Dakotas; 18 aircraft were lost. The same number flew the following day, although their departure was delayed by fog. This time 2,000 rations were collected, enough to provide about a third of the division's requirements, along with 330 rounds of 75 mm and 140 rounds of 6-pounder ammunition. This time fifteen aircraft were lost, of which eleven were Stirlings. On 21 September, American fighters based in England were supporting a bombing raid, and half the British fighters were grounded by inclement weather. The supply lift of 63 Stirlings and 63 Dakotas was attacked by German fighters, and 31 aircraft were lost. On the ground, 400 rounds of 75 mm and 170 rounds of 6-pounder ammunition was collected, but in four days only 24 rounds of 17-pounder ammunition had been retrieved.

Some resupply aircraft took off on 22 September, but were diverted to Brussels while in the air. The DAA was now under mortar fire, and some ammunition caught fire. A stack of 6-pounder shells exploded, but the fires were extinguished. Another resupply attempt was made on 23 September with 73 Stirlings and 55 Dakotas from the England and 18 aircraft from Brussels. This time 160 rounds of 75 mm and 80 rounds of 6-pounder ammunition was collected, but ammunition for the PIATs and Sten guns was critically short. There were now only a few serviceable jeeps and trailers available to distribute supplies. The resupply drop for 24 September was cancelled due to bad weather, although a drop was made near Grave, which was collected by the seaborne echelon. Most of its stock of 75mm and 6-pounder ammunition was handed over to the US 82nd Airborne Division after the 1st Airborne Division was evacuated from north of the Rhine on the night of 25/26 September.

== Ports ==
=== Channel ports ===
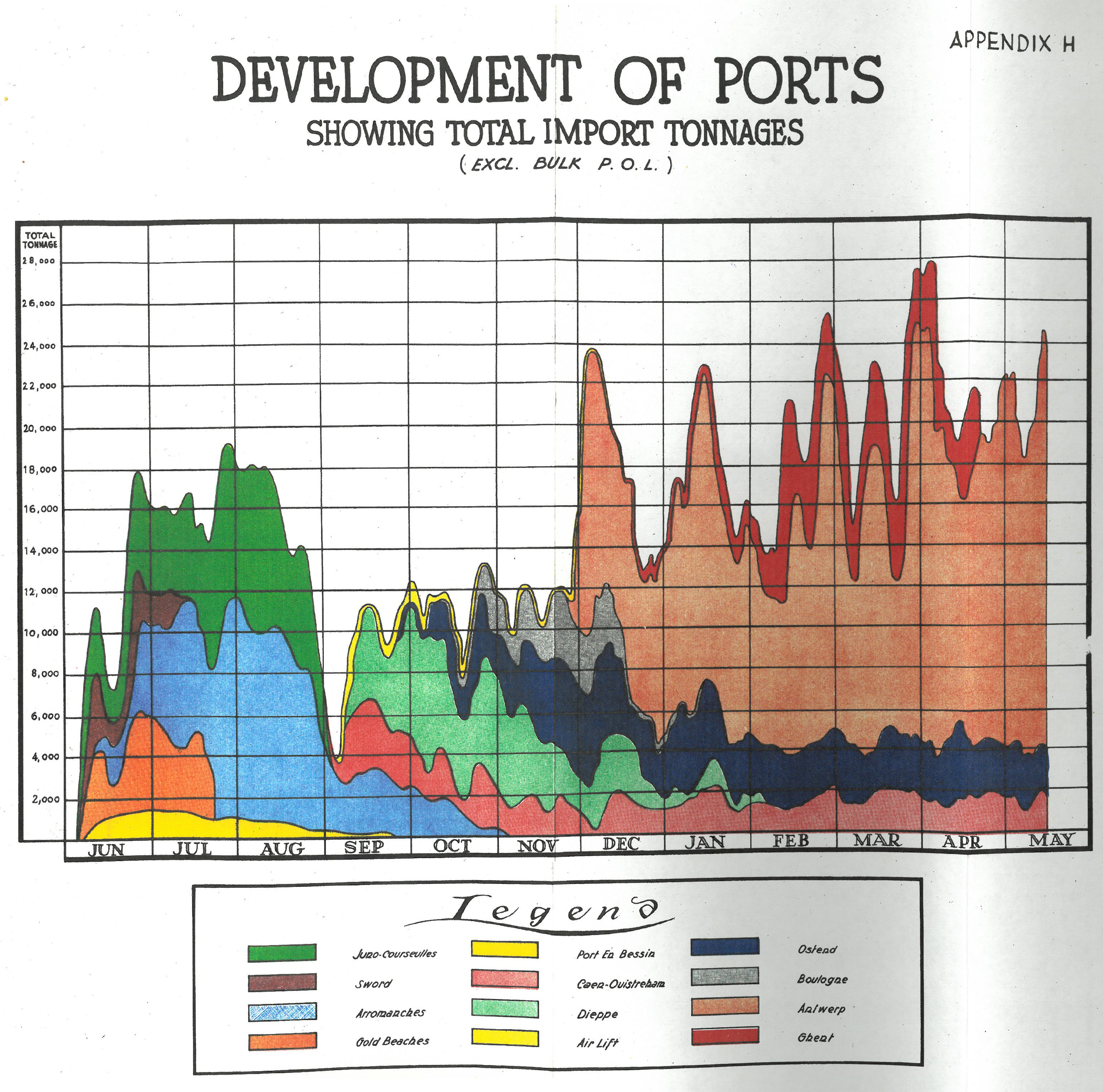
Development of ports by 21st Army Group

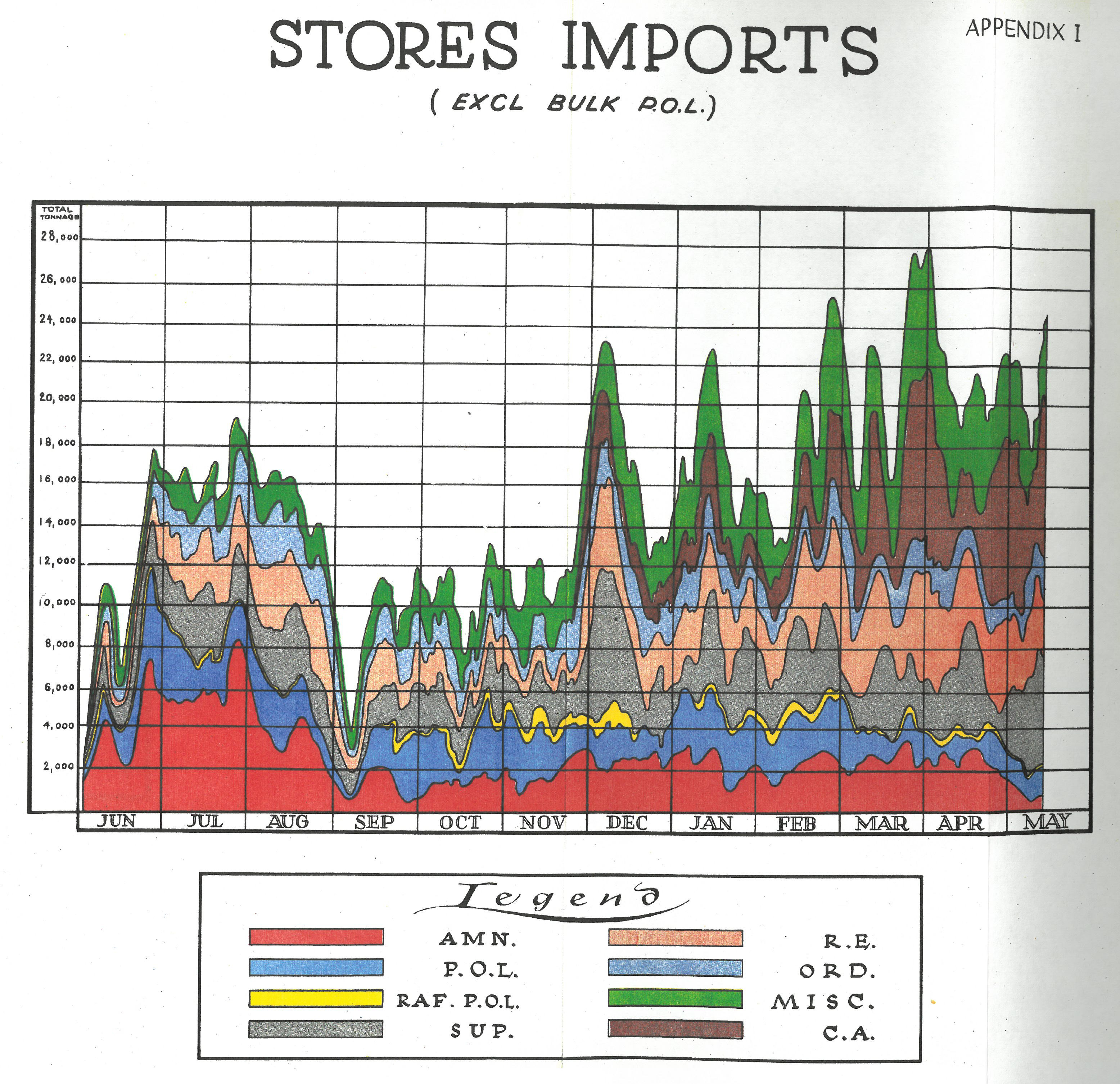
Stores Imports by 21st Army Group

At the end of August, two port operating groups operated the Mulberry, Caen and Ouistreham, while the other four groups were withdrawn in preparation to deploying forward. The Canadian First Army had the mission of capturing the Channel ports. Rouen was captured by the Canadians on 30 August, and Le Tréport and Dieppe were taken in an assault on 1 September. Although Dieppe's port facilities were almost intact, the approaches were extensively mined and several days of minesweeping were required; the first coaster docked there on 7 September. The rail link from Dieppe to Amiens was ready to accept traffic the day before. By the end of September, Dieppe had a capacity of 6,100 to 7,100 tonnes (6,000 to 7,000 long tons) per day. Le Tréport became a satellite port of Dieppe, and was used chiefly by the RAF for handling of awkward and bulky loads such as Queen Mary trailers with crashed aircraft, which were carried in Landing craft tank (LCTs). The port fell into disuse after Boulogne was opened.

A full-scale assault was required to capture Le Havre, and by the time the garrison surrendered on 12 September, the port was badly damaged. Unexpectedly, SHAEF allocated the port to the American forces. It was feared that this would create problems with the British and American lines of communications crossing each other, but the anticipated difficulties did not eventuate.

Boulogne was captured on 22 September, but was badly damaged: most of the port equipment had been destroyed, and the harbour mouth was blocked by twenty-six sunken ships. The Royal Navy cleared a channel 300 feet (91 m) wide and 8 feet (2.4 m) deep, which permitted two coasters to get through on 12 October. Clearance of the wrecks was completed a month later, by which time the Royal Engineers had effected repairs to the quays to allow five coasters to berth. Thereafter, it handled a daily average of 2,000 long tons (2,000 t) until early 1945, when it was handed over to the French. In its time under British control, the port received 9,000 personnel, 10,000 vehicles and 125,000 long tons (127,000 t) of stores.

The German guns at Calais had to be silenced to facilitate the minesweeping operations to open Boulogne, so the port was captured on 29 September. SHAEF initially allocated the port to US control with the intention of developing landing ship, tank (LST), berths there for discharging vehicles, but the Communication Zone did not follow up on these plans, and when the 21st Army Group requested permission to use the railway terminal, SHAEF re-allocated it to British control on 23 October. It too was so badly damaged that repair work was initially confined to the construction of the railway terminal for LSTs equipped with rails and the ferry HMS Twickenham. The SS Shepperton Ferry berthed on 21 November, and Calais became the major personnel reception port in the British sector. Stores were not discharged there until January, and the daily average was only around 350 long tons (360 t).

Ostend was captured on 9 September – the naval port party had to clear a passage through the fourteen wrecks that obstructed the harbour entrance. A channel 150 feet (46 m) wide and 7 feet (2.1 m) deep was cleared by 24 September, allowing coasters to enter the harbour the following day. Some quays were completely destroyed, but others were only damaged or obstructed by debris. These were cleared and repaired by the Royal Engineers. By the end of September the port had a capacity of 1,000 long tons (1,000 t) of cargo daily, which rose to 5,000 long tons (5,100 t) a day by the end of November, not counting bulk POL that was pumped ashore from tankers. A berth was lost when the SS Cedarwood was sunk in the harbour by a mine, but by November it was normally working three landing ships, infantry (LSIs), a hospital carrier, five LSTs and several coasters a day. Its turnaround time for coasters was 1 1/4 days, which was faster than any other port in North West Europe.

The shipping available to the 21st Army Group in early September was limited by the inability of the recently captured Channel Ports to handle vessels larger than coasters. The capacity of the ports was estimated at 12,000 long tons (12,000 t) per day, but in practice no more than 10,000 long tons (10,000 t) could be discharged daily. The coasters and landing ships had been in continuous use since D-Day, resulting in wear and tear. As the deteriorating autumn weather set in, an ever-increasing proportion were deadlined for repairs. Larger ships could still use the Mulberry harbour at Arromanches, but the RMA already held more stores than could be moved forward. A gale in early October caused considerable disruption to Mulberry operations. The two tombolas floating ship-to-shore lines at Port-en-Bessin were put out of action, and discharge of bulk POL there from tankers ceased. With the opening of Boulogne, two deep water berths became available. The port capacity available was sufficient to maintain the 21st Army Group and build up a small reserve, but not for major operations.

=== Antwerp ===
Although Antwerp was captured on 4 September, the port was unusable because the Scheldt estuary that provided access to the port remained in German hands. In the meantime, a port construction and repair company arrived on 12 September and commenced the rehabilitation of the port. On 9 October, Eisenhower sent Montgomery a telegram that read:

The recent gale has materially reduced the intake at Cherbourg while Arromanches, which we counted on to assist materially in supply for US forces was severely damaged. This emphasises the supreme importance of Antwerp ... I must repeat, we are now squarely up against the situation which we have anticipated for months; our intake into the continent will not support our battle. All operations will come to a standstill unless Antwerp is producing by middle of November. I must emphasise that I consider Antwerp of first importance of all our endeavours on the entire front from Switzerland to the Channel. I believe your personal attention is required in operation designed to clear entrance.

This was followed by a longer message that reached Montgomery on 15 October. The following day Montgomery issued a new directive to the 21st Army Group prioritising the opening of Antwerp over the advance to the Rhine, and committing the British Second Army as well as the Canadian First Army to the Battle of the Scheldt. The latter was being maintained by No. 7 Army Roadhead at Lens but for the Scheldt operation a No. 9 Army Roadhead was established in the Termonde-Alost-Ghent area, where it was served by railway links between Ostend and Ghent, and Lille and Ghent. The new roadhead opened on 8 October, although part of the Canadian First Army continued to draw its supplies from No. 7 Army Roadhead, and was stocked by trains from Roubaix, Dieppe and the RMA.

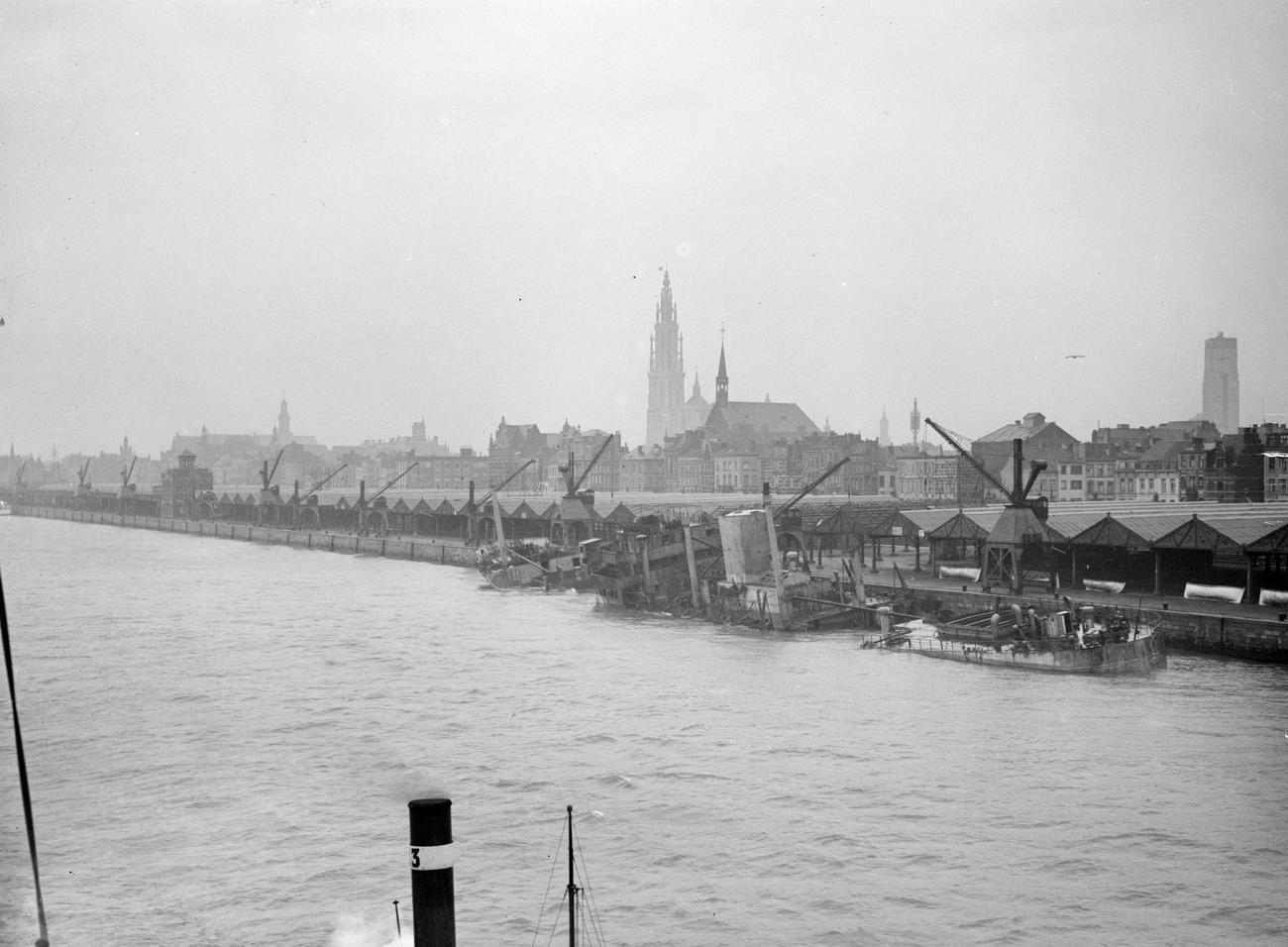
First Allied convoy enters Antwerp. The docks at Antwerp with a ship scuttled by the Germans before they retired.

During Operation Market Garden, No. 161 FMC at Bourg-Leopold had expanded beyond the size of a normal FMC, and a great deal of US Army supplies had been accumulated, which now had to be disposed of. Second Army took it over as the basis of a new army roadhead, No. 8 Army Roadhead. As one of the Belgian pre-war military centres it contained suitable accommodation and was well served by road and railway communications. The roads in the area were straight with wide road verges, which made them ideal for roadside stacking of stores, and was also well-placed to support the Second Army's ongoing operations. Its only drawback was a shortage of covered storage space, so supplies often had to be stored in the open. Stocking of the new roadhead commenced on 4 October, and was largely done by rail.

During Operation Infatuate, the operations on Walcheren Island to open Antwerp, British commandos captured Flushing on 4 November, bringing both sides of the Scheldt under Allied control. An attempt had already been made to commence minesweeping two days earlier but three of the minesweepers had been hit by guns at Zeebrugge, and the attempt had been abandoned. Zeebrugge was in Canadian hands the following day, and minesweepers from Ostend reached Breskens. Minesweeping operations commenced on 4 November, with ten flotillas engaged. Fifty mines were swept on the first day, and six minesweepers made their way to Antwerp. Thereafter, sweeping operations continued from both ends of the Scheldt. One minesweeper was lost with all hands, but on 26 November the naval officer in charge of the minesweeping effort, Captain H. G. Hopper, announced that sweeping operations were complete.

The port of Antwerp was opened to coasters that day and to deep-draught shipping on 28 November. The first ship to berth was Canadian-built SS Fort Cataraqui. The quays were cleared of obstructions and the Kruisschans Lock was repaired by December. Antwerp could receive shipping not just from the UK, but directly from the United States and the Middle East. The first order placed for direct shipment from the United States was for 18,000 long tons (18,000 t) of flour, sugar, dried fruit, condensed milk, powdered eggs and luncheon meat, to arrive in January 1945. Subsequent orders were for flour and meat only, as sufficient stocks of the other goods were held in the UK to sustain the 21st Army Group for six months. The first ocean-going refrigerated vessel docked at Antwerp on 2 December 1944, and daily issues of fresh meat from South America became possible, although transhipment via the UK was still sometimes necessary.

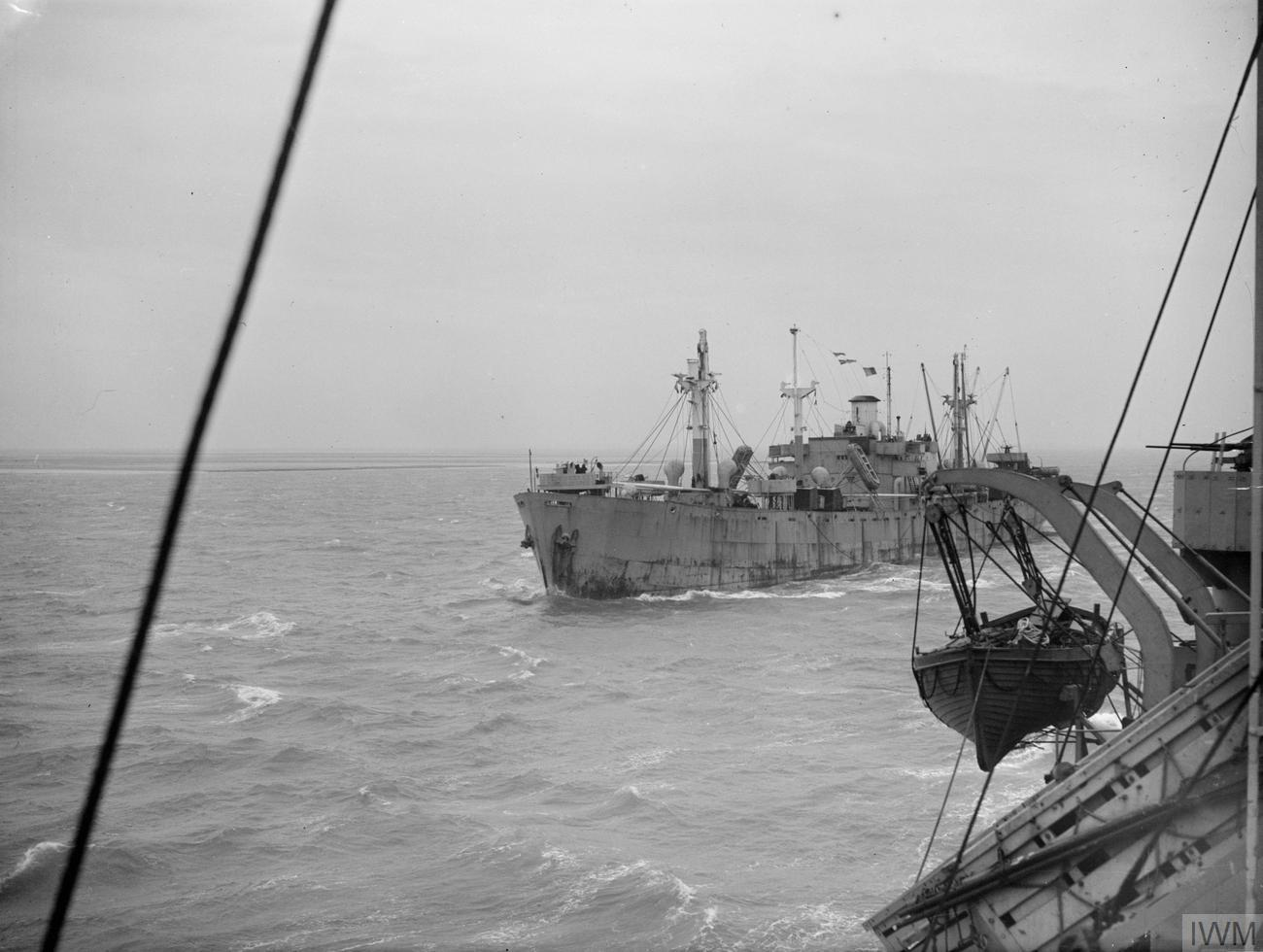
The first Allied convoy enters Antwerp on 28 November. The Liberty ship SS Samhope, the first US ship of the convoy, steams up the Scheldt.

Antwerp had 26 miles (42 km) of quays, which were located along the river and in eighteen wet basins (docks open to the water). They were equipped with over 600 hydraulic and electric cranes, and there were also floating cranes and grain elevators. There were 900 warehouses, a granary capable of storing nearly 1,000,000 imperial bushels (36,000,000 L) and 750,000 cubic feet (21,000 m^{3}) of cold storage. Petroleum pipelines ran from the tanker berths to 498 storage tanks with a capacity of 100,000,000 imperial gallons (450,000,000 L). Labour to work the port was plentiful, and it was well-served by roads, railway and canals for barge traffic. There were 500 miles (800 km) of railway lines that connected to the Belgian railway system, and there was access to inland waterways, including the Albert Canal, which connected to the Meuse River. Although the port area was only lightly damaged, the Germans had removed 35 miles (56 km) of railway track and 200 points and crossings, and the marshalling yards had been damaged by artillery and mortar fire. To handle dredging, a Scheldt Dredging Control organisation was established; its work involved coordinating military requirements with longer-term civilian policy. Some 1,031,000 cubic yards (788,000 m^{3}) of silt was dredged between 2 November 1944 and 31 January 1945.

SHAEF decreed that Antwerp would handle both American and British supplies, under British direction. For this purpose, a special combined American and British staff was created in the Q (Movements) Branch at 21st Army Group Headquarters, and a Memorandum of Agreement known as the "Charter of Antwerp" was drawn up and signed by Graham and US Colonel Fenton S. Jacobs, the commander of the Communication Zone's Channel Base Section. Overall command of the port was vested in the Royal Navy Naval Officer in Charge (NOIC), Captain Cowley Thomas, who also chaired a port executive committee on which both American and British interests were represented. Local administration was the responsibility of the British base sub area commander. US forces were allocated primary rights to the roads and railway lines leading south east to Liège, while the British were given those leading to the north and north east. A joint US, British and Belgian Movements Organization for Transport (BELMOT) was created to coordinate highway, railway and waterway traffic. A tonnage discharge target of 40,000 long tons (41,000 t) per day was set, of which 17,500 long tons (17,800 t) was British and 22,500 long tons (22,900 t) was American. This was not counting bulk POL, for which there was sufficient capacity for both. However, Antwerp was not an ideal base port; in peacetime it had been a transit port, and it lacked warehouse and factory space. The lack of warehouse space meant that when congestion occurred it was very difficult to clear. The surrounding area soon became crowded with dumps and depots.

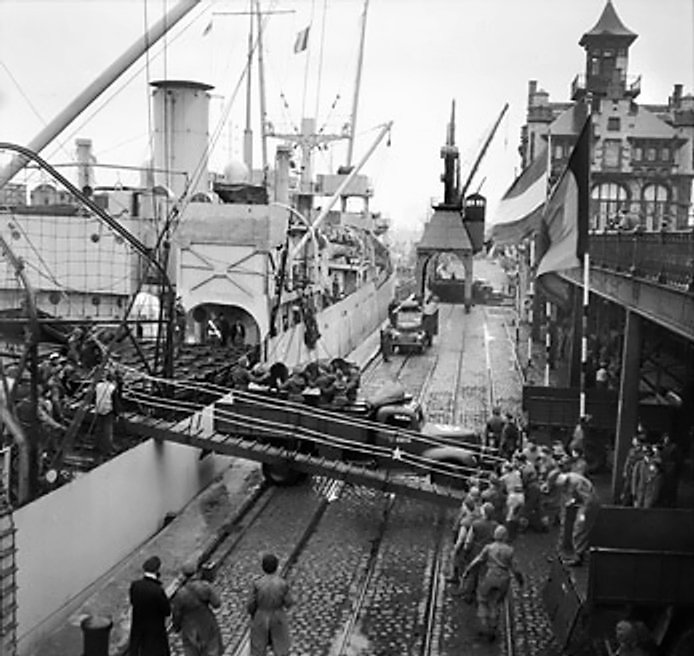
Oil being unloaded at Antwerp from the SS Fort Cataraqui

Although damage to the port and its environs was minor, Antwerp repeatedly failed to meet its tonnage targets. This was mainly attributable to insufficient warehouse space, a shortage of railway rolling stock, and delays in opening the Albert Canal to barge traffic. The canal was supposed to open on 15 December, but clearing away obstructions, particularly the demolished Yserburg Bridge at the entrance, delayed its opening until 28 December, by which time a backlog of 198 loaded barges had accumulated. Temporary lighting was supplied to the Antwerp quays and dumps in December to allow the port to be worked around the clock. Twenty-one lighting sets were made by mounting a 3 kW 3-phase electric generator on a bogie with a 10-foot (3.0 m) platform on which six floodlights were installed.

Another cause of difficulties at Antwerp was German V-weapons attacks, which began on 1 October. This had a serious impact on the availability of civilian labour, and military labour had to be brought in. Nonetheless, the number of civilians employed at the port rose from 7,652 in early December 1944 to over 14,000 in January 1945. Whenever possible, US Army stores were moved directly from the quays to depots maintained by the Communications Zone around Liège and Namur, but these too were frequent targets of V-weapons.

By the end of the year, 994 V-2 rocket and 5,097 V-1 flying bomb attacks had been made against continental targets, resulting in 792 military personnel killed and 993 wounded, and 2,219 deaths and 4,493 serious injuries to civilians. The worst carnage in a single attack occurred on 16 December when the Cine Rex in Brussels was hit by a V-2 rocket and 567 people were killed. Four berths at the port were damaged in an attack on 24 December, and the sluice gate at the entrance from the Scheldt was damaged, thereby increasing the locking time by eight minutes. Two large cargo ships and 58 smaller vessels were sunk between September 1944 and March 1945, and there was damage to the roads, railways, cranes and quays, but not enough to seriously impact the functioning of the port.

E-boats made several attempts to disrupt convoys sailing to Antwerp, but the convoys were escorted by destroyers that drove them off, and RAF Bomber Command attacked their bases at IJmuiden and Rotterdam in December. In the first three months of 1945, torpedoes from E-boats sank 12,072 deadweight tons (12,266 deadweight tonnes) of Allied shipping, and mines laid by them sank 67,626 deadweight tons (68,711 deadweight tonnes) more. Seehund midget submarines accounted for another 9,282 deadweight tons (9,431 deadweight tonnes) of sunken ships. Also dangerous was aerial mining, as the sinking of a single large vessel in the Scheldt could have halted traffic in both directions for days. A major German aerial mining effort was made on 23 January 1945, with 36 mines being swept over the following five days, but this turned out to be the last minelaying mission directed against Antwerp.

=== Ghent ===
The danger of relying too heavily on Antwerp was recognised, and to guard against the contingency of an event that made Antwerp unusable, such as a V-2 striking an ammunition ship, the inland port of Ghent was developed as an alternative. It could be accessed via the Ghent–Terneuzen Canal, could take ships with draughts of up 24 feet (7.3 m), and was capable of handling up to 16,000 long tons (16,000 t) per day. The port was operated as under joint US-British control. The British had effected a hasty repair of the sea locks at Terneuzen, which had been badly damaged, to enable landing craft to access the Scheldt for the landing on Walcheren. Dutch engineers estimated that permanent repairs would take six months, but a Royal Engineers (RE) port construction and repair company was able to do it in just two. Ghent had only been used by the Germans for barge traffic, so bringing it into operation required dredging. This was carried out by the US Army hopper dredge W. L. Marshall, which had previously been engaged in dredging the Scheldt, and had several doors blown off by near misses by V-1s and V-2s. Together with the Channel ports, Ghent provided sufficient capacity to meet the Allied armies' minimum needs.

== Transport ==
=== Roads ===
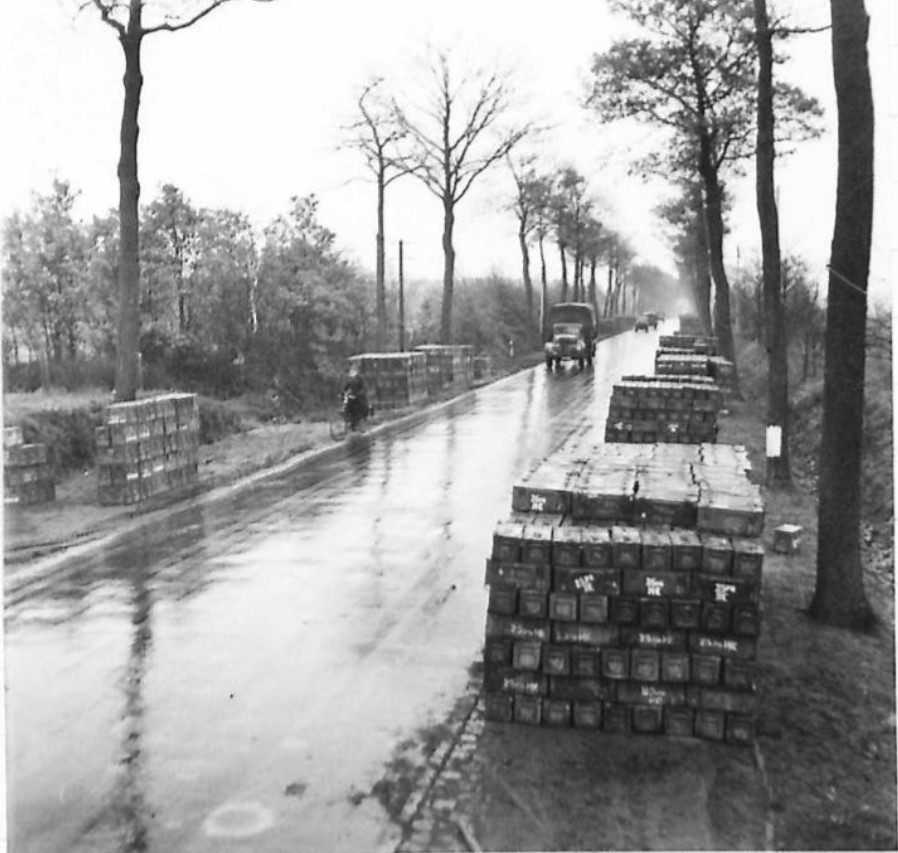
Ammunition piled up alongside a road from whence it is collected

An FMC normally held two days' rations, one days' maintenance, two or three days' supply of petrol (about 200,000 imperial gallons (910,000 L)) and 3,500 long tons (3,600 t) of ammunition. Each corps had two corps troops composite companies and a corps transport company. Between them they had 222 3-ton (3.4 m^{3}) lorries, 12 10-ton (11 m^{3}) lorries and 36 tippers. The tippers were never available for general duties, as they were continuously employed on construction tasks by the Royal Engineers. The normal daily requirement of a corps was 800 to 1,000 long tons (810 to 1,020 t), of which the corps transport had to lift 900 long tons (910 t). The corps' transport resources were inadequate and had to supplemented by borrowing lorries from the armies or the divisions.

With one exception, the infantry divisions of the 21st Army Group reorganised their transport on a commodity basis, with one company for supplies, one for POL, one for artillery ammunition and one for other kinds of ammunition. The armoured divisions, again with one exception, organised theirs with one company less one platoon for supplies, one plus a platoon for POL, one for ammunition and one for troop transport. Organisation by commodities was found to simplify transport arrangements and make it easier to supply lorries for use by the corps or for troop transport when required. Doctrine called for vehicles to be kept loaded when possible, providing a reserve on wheels but with Allied air supremacy, this was no longer necessary and the priority switched to dumping supplies and keeping the transport occupied.

Several expedients were used to increase the capacity of the road transport system. The First Canadian Army converted a tank transporter trailer into a load carrier by welding pierced steel plank onto it to give it a floor and sides. Second Army HQ was sufficiently impressed to order the conversion of a company of tank transporters. Modified this way, a tank transporter could haul 16.5 long tons (16.8 t) of supplies, 36 long tons (37 t) of ammunition or 10 long tons (10 t) of POL. These could carry a considerable amount in a convoy of reasonable length, but careful traffic control was required to ensure that they avoided narrow roads. Additional vehicles were allocated to transport companies with sufficient drivers, two 10-ton general transport companies were issued with 5-ton trailers, and eight DUKW companies were re-equipped with regular 3-ton lorries. This left only three DUKW companies, one of which was on loan to the US Army. One 6-ton and two 3-ton general transport companies that had also been loaned to the US Army in August were returned on 4 September. Eight additional transport platoons were formed from the transport of anti-aircraft units.

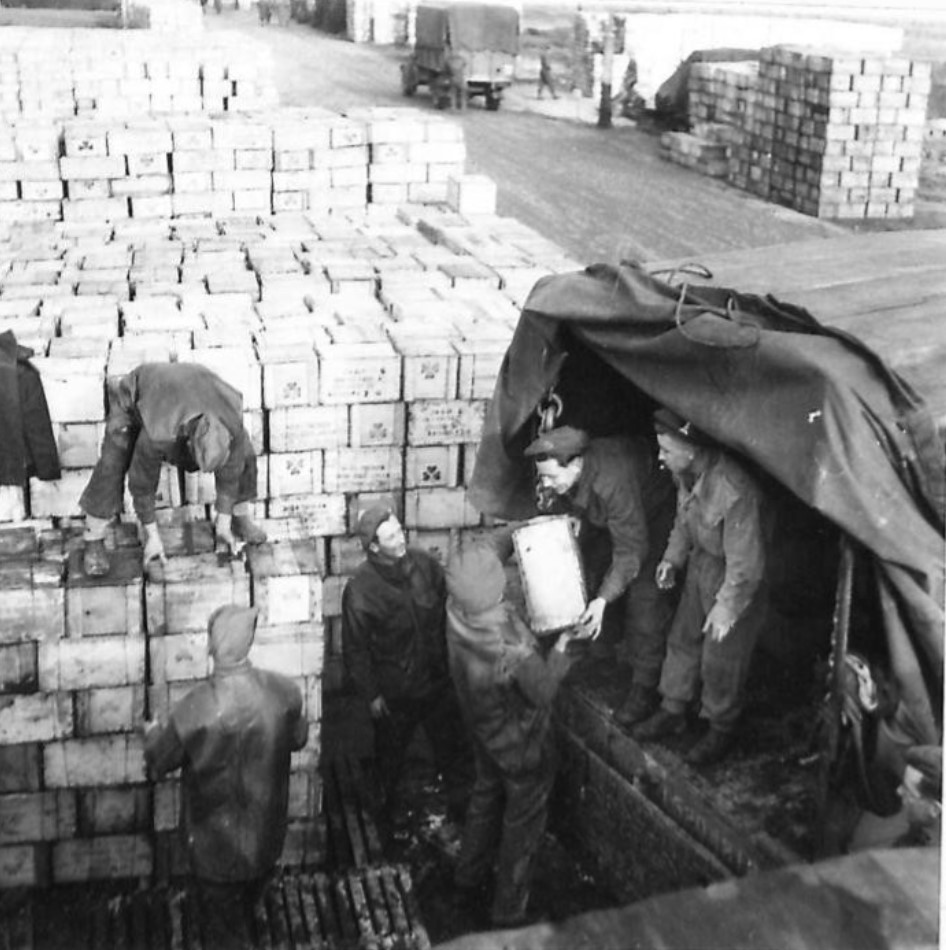
Lorries are loaded with supplies at No. 8 Army Roadhead

In response to an urgent request from 21st Army Group on 3 September, two transport companies were formed from the Anti-Aircraft Command and two from the War Office Airfields Transport Column, and shipped within six days. A second urgent request was received on 15 September. The War Office agreed to loan 21st Army Group an additional twelve transport companies with a combined lift of 9,756 long tons (9,913 t). They were drawn from the Anti-Aircraft Command and Command Mixed Transport units. Five companies arrived by 26 September. Five of them came pre-loaded with petrol, five with supplies, and two came empty. To control them, three new transport column HQs were formed in the UK and sent as well.

On 19 September, 21st Army Group HQ assumed control of transport through an organisation called TRANCO. Two CRASCs were assigned to the area north of the Seine and two to the south. In each area, one was responsible for the road patrol and staging camps, and the other, known as "control", reported on the location and availability of transport. Loading bills were sent out daily by telephone or radio 48-hours in advance. Road and railway traffic became more routine during October, and TRANCO was abolished at the end of the month. However, until the railway bridge at Ravenstein was repaired in December, the support of the British Second Army's operations to the south east of Nijmegen was still by road.

To economise on manpower and release RASC personnel to become infantry reinforcements, the RASC motor transport units were reorganised in October. Sixteen army transport companies were reorganised as sixteen 3-ton or 6-ton general transport companies with four platoons each, although they retained their original designations. The bulk petrol transport companies were reorganised from six companies with four platoons into eight companies with three platoons. Each platoon operated thirty vehicles.

In November, Belgian Army units were formed into transport companies. After training in the UK, they took over the equipment of the seventeen companies loaned by the War Office, whose personnel were then returned to the UK for retraining and further service in South East Asia. This transport pool was directly controlled by the 21st Army Group headquarters, although it was administered by the Belgian government.

To give the general transport companies some much-needed time for rest and maintenance, captured German horses, wagons and saddlery were pressed into service. These were supplemented by hired and requisitioned Belgian civilian animal transport. In the first half of December, 9,500 long tons (9,700 t) was moved by animal transport, mostly in the Antwerp area.

The major contributor to deterioration of the roads was running two-way traffic down narrow roads. Vehicles running with wheels on the verges caused rutting of the verges, which in turn caused damage to the road haunches. Once these were broken, the carriageway surface started to break up. In places where there were no trees to prevent driving on the verges, thousands of 5-foot (1.5 m) 4-by-2-inch (102 by 51 mm) wooden pickets were driven into the ground. Stone for road repair was drawn from porphyry rock quarries at Lessines, Bierghes and Quenast, and 100,000 long tons (100,000 t) of slag suitable for making pitch was obtained from the zinc works at Neerpelt. In January 1945, the RE Quarrying Group produced 170,000 long tons (170,000 t) of stone.

=== Railways ===
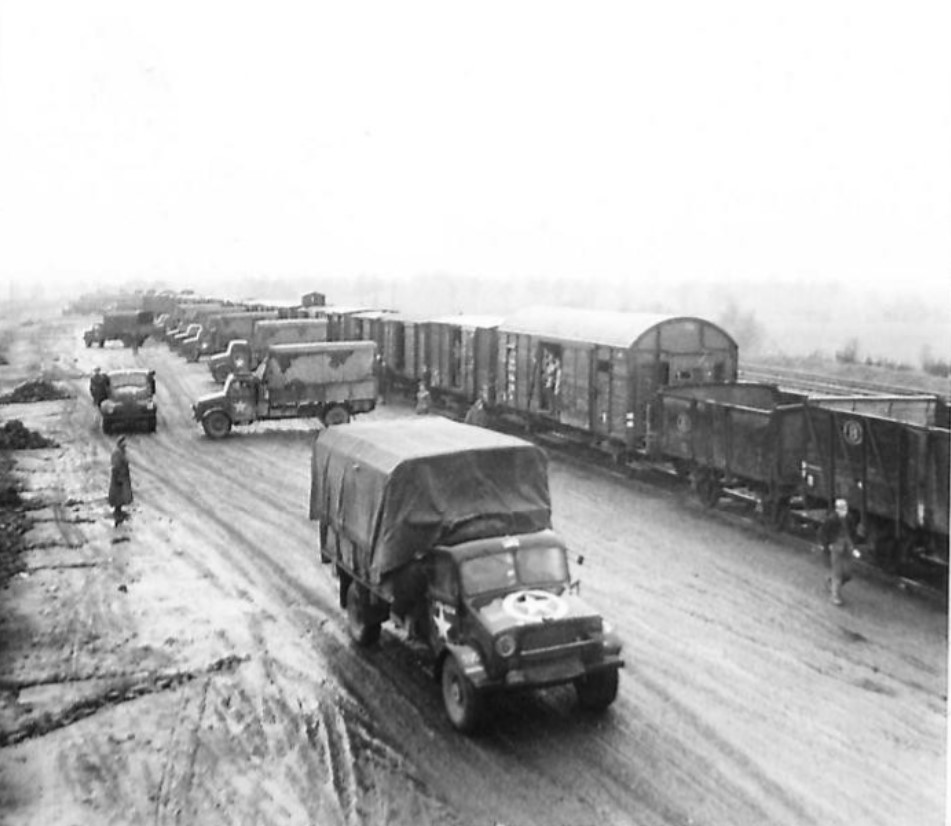
Ammunition train being unloaded at No. 8 Army Roadhead

It was imperative to get the railway system operational again as soon as possible. The most pressing problem was the destruction of bridges, particularly those over the Seine. In northern France however, the devastation was less widespread, and rehabilitation was faster than south of the Seine. This work was carried out by British Army, civilian and POW workers. Commencing on 10 September, stores from the RMA began moving forward to railheads around Bernay. Lorries then took them across the Seine to the Beauvais area, where they were loaded back on trains and taken to railheads south of Brussels serving No. 6 Army Roadhead. On 8 September, work commenced on bridging the Seine. A new 529-foot (161 m) railway bridge at Le Manoir was completed on 22 September, allowing trains to cross the Seine. Two bridges across the Somme were still down, but by making a diversion around Doullens, trains could reach Brussels. In November and December, the Seine rose to its highest level since 1910, and the current ran at 10 knots (19 km/h; 12 mph). There were fears for the bridge at Le Manoir as the waters rose almost to the level of the rails, but the bridge remained standing.

While the US Army had its own railway operating units, the British forces were dependent on the French and Belgian railway authorities to operate the Amiens-Lille-Brussels line. In return for military assistance in restoring the rail network, the local authorities accepted that military traffic had priority over civilian. France had around 12,000 locomotives before the war, but only about 2,000 were serviceable by September 1944. With some quick repairs, it was possible to raise this to 6,000; but it was still necessary to import British-built War Department Austerity 0-6-0ST, 2-8-0 and 2-10-0 locomotives to supplement them. Plans called for a thousand engines to be brought across, of which 900 were to be 2-8-0s. Their delivery was slow, owing to the SHAEF's inadequate allocation of locomotives and rolling stock on the British account at Cherbourg, the only port that could receive them. This limitation was overcome when Dieppe was opened as a railway ferry terminal on 28 September. By the end of November 150 locomotives had been landed at Dieppe and Ostend using LSTs that had been specially fitted with rails to allow them to be driven on and off. Calais also began receiving rolling stock on 21 November.

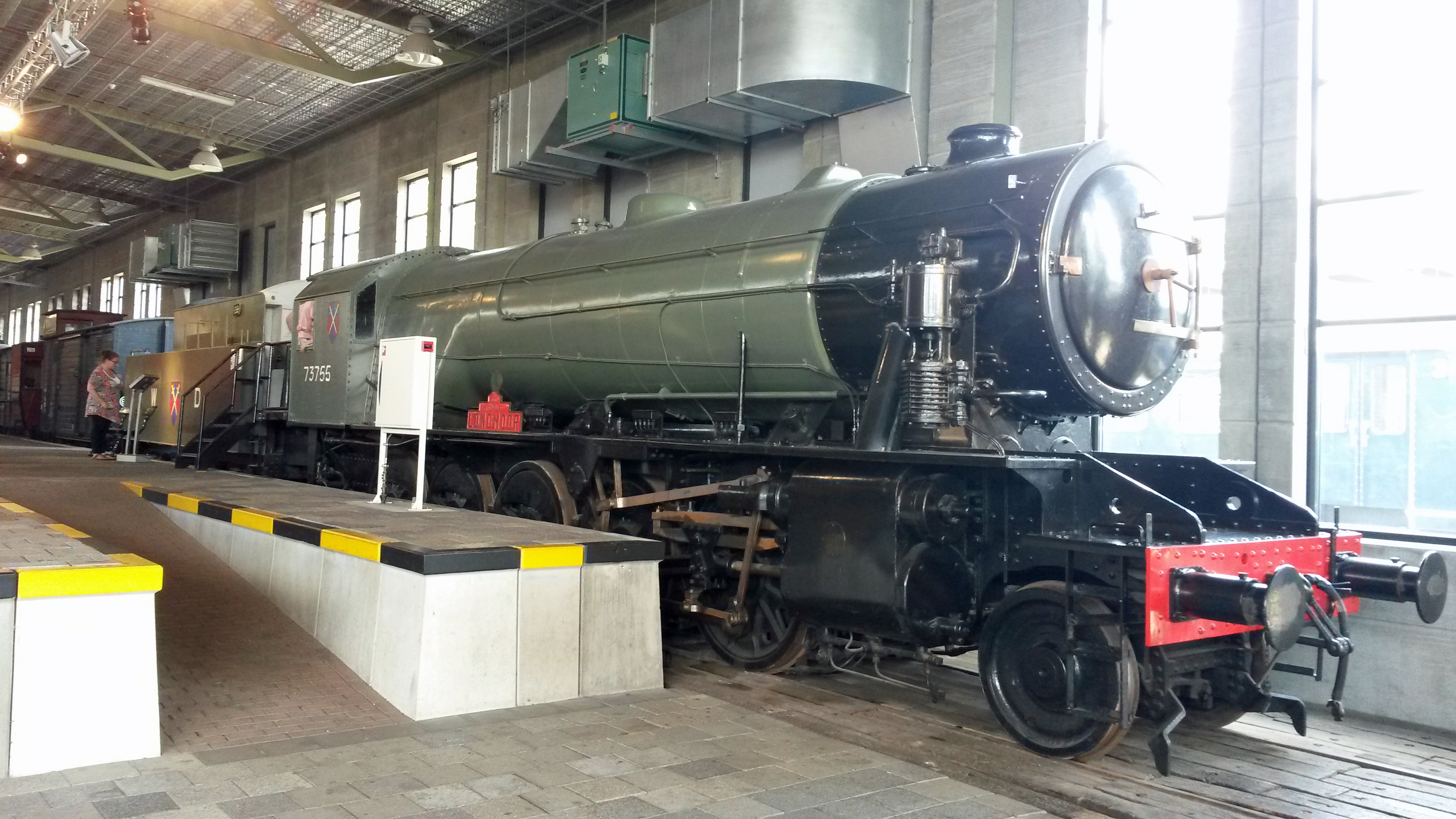
Preserved WD Austerity 2-10-0 Longmoor with 21st Army Group markings at the Nederlands Spoorwegmuseum

Rolling stock was only part of the problem; the railway operators had to contend with damaged tracks, depleted staff and a non-operational telephone system. Rounding up enough locomotives for the day's work might involve visits to half a dozen marshalling yards by an official on a bicycle. Coordination of the system was the responsibility of the Q (Movements) Branch at 21st Army Group Headquarters. Rehabilitation of the railway system in that part of the Netherlands in Allied hands involved the reconstruction of bridges over the many rivers and canals. The Germans had demolished almost all the railway bridges, and most involved spans of over 100 feet (30 m). By 6 October, the line had reached Eindhoven.

The Americans assumed responsibility for all rail traffic west of Liseux on 23 October. Nineteen bridges, six of which were double-track, were opened in November, and work was under way on twenty-two more. No less than 4,000 feet (1,200 m) of bridging was erected during the month. By the end of the year, 75 railway bridges consisting of 202 spans were partly or completely rebuilt, most of the repairs to the Antwerp marshalling yards were complete, and with the completion of the bridge at 's-Hertogenbosch, trains were running from Antwerp to railheads at Ravenstein and Mill, just 10 miles (16 km) from the front line.

=== Air ===
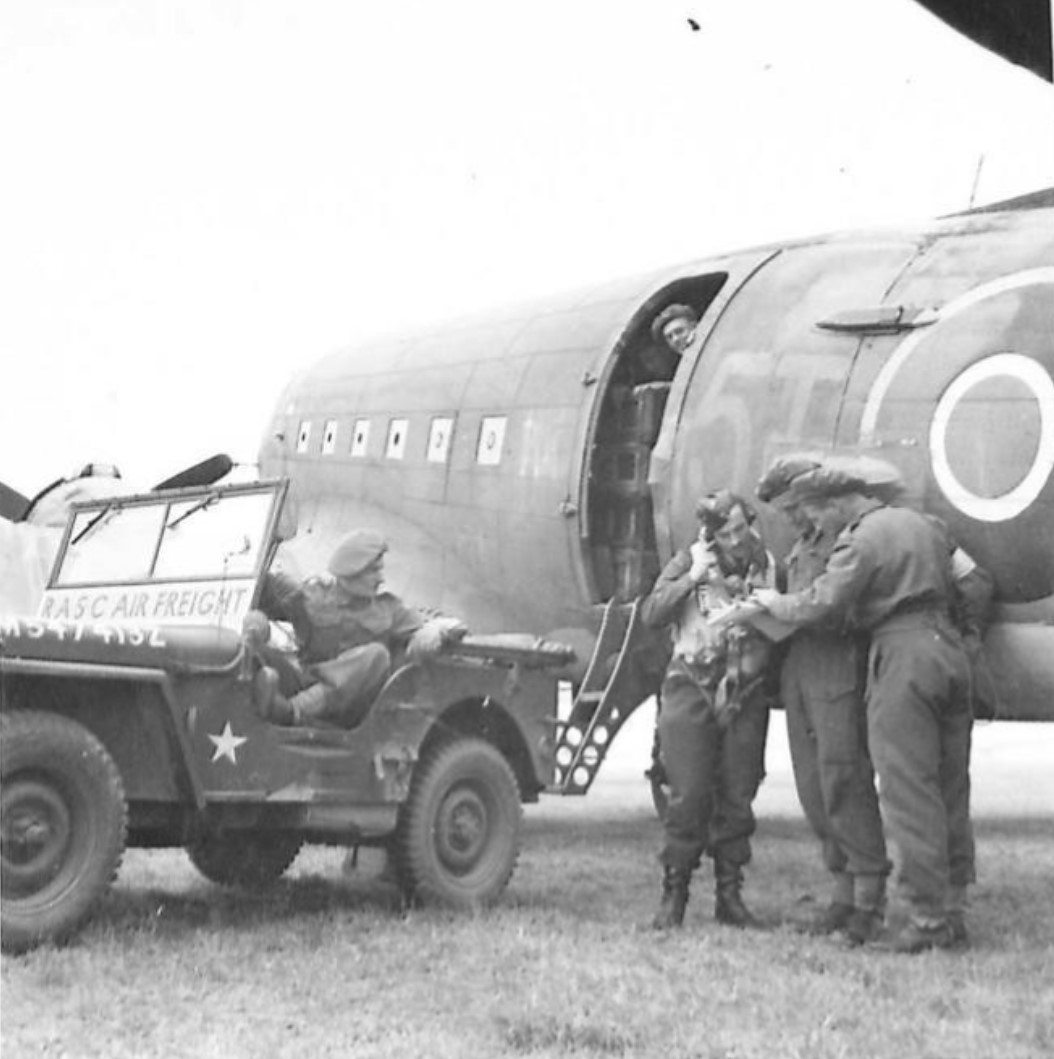
Flying Officer G. T. Clarkson of No. 233 Squadron RAF hands his load chit to the air freight reception clerk at No. 147 DID at Brussels airport upon arriving from the UK with a load of compo rations.

The 21st Army Group had made little use of resupply by air during the Normandy campaign, with the exception of the Polish 1st Armoured Division in August. The RAF operated an aerial freight service but deliveries did not exceed 200 long tons (200 t) per week in June, and the average weekly delivery was half this. Demand increased dramatically when the 21st Army Group moved beyond the Seine. In the first week of September, 1,600 long tons (1,600 t) of petrol and 300 long tons (300 t) of supplies were delivered to airfields in the Amiens-Douai area. The following week, with German opposition increasing, priority switched to ammunition, of which 2,200 long tons (2,200 t) was delivered, along with 800 long tons (810 t) of POL and 300 long tons (300 t) of supplies.

By this time the airfields around Brussels had been restored to use, and became the destination of air freight, except for some deliveries of POL to Lille. Over the next five weeks, the RAF delivered 18,000 long tons (18,000 t) of air freight to Brussels' Evere Airport alone. Sometimes more than a thousand aircraft arrived in a single day, more than could be cleared with the available road transport, necessitating the establishment of temporary dumps at the airfields. A CRASC transport column HQ that had been specially trained in handling air freight was brought up from the RMA. It took control of two DIDs, and received an average of 400 to 500 long tons (410 to 510 t) of cargo each day.

=== Pipelines ===
Operation Pluto was the codename for the project to bring bulk petrol directly from the UK using submarine pipelines that were laid across the English Channel. Two innovative types of pipe were developed. One design, known as Hais, was a flexible pipe, akin to a submarine telegraph cable, that could be laid by a cable layer ship. This was tested in December 1942 by running a cable pipeline across the Bristol Channel from Swansea; the design was so successful it was decided to upgrade it from 2 to 3 in (5.1 to 7.6 cm) in diameter. The other design, known as Hamel, used steel pipe that was welded together and wound around special floating drums 50-foot (15 m) in diameter known as Conundrums, which deployed the cable like giant bobbins.

Three ships were fitted out with cable-laying machinery, and Thames barges were converted up to handle the cable at ends where the waters were too shallow for the ships to operate. Two systems were planned: the first, with a pumping station codenamed "Bambi" was established at Sandown on the Isle of Wight to supply fuel to a terminal near Cherbourg, 65 nautical miles (120 km; 75 mi) distant, and one, with a pumping station codenamed "Dumbo", at Dungeness on the coast of Kent, to supply fuel across the Strait of Dover to a terminal near Boulogne, 23 nautical miles (43 km; 26 mi) away.

The project got off to a slow start owing to delays in the capture of Cherbourg, and then in minesweeping of the approaches, and was further dogged by bad weather and technical difficulties in laying the pipelines. Pumping operations commenced on 22 September, but by this time Cherbourg harbour had been opened to tankers, and the 21st Army Group was operating in Belgium and the Netherlands. The working pipelines failed on 3 October, after 935,000 imperial gallons (4,250,000 L) had been delivered, and the Bambi project was discontinued the following day.

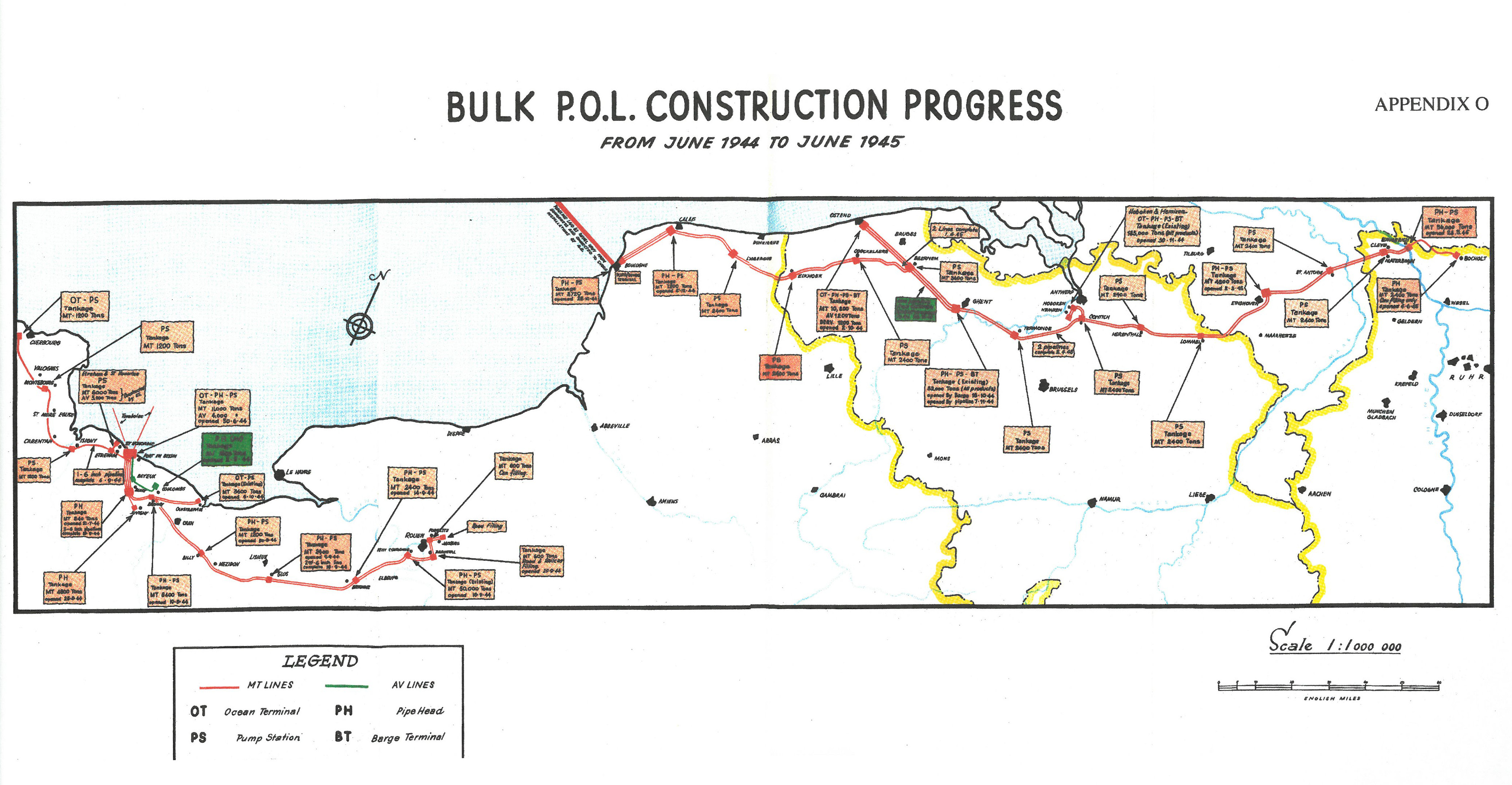
The supply of Bulk POL to the 21st Army Group

Meanwhile, Boulogne was captured on 22 September, and the port was opened on 12 October. Work switched to the Dumbo system, which involved a much shorter pipeline distance, and was closer to where the 21st Army Group was operating. Lines were run to a beach in the outer harbour of Boulogne instead of Ambleteuse as originally planned because the beach at the latter was heavily mined. A Hais pipeline was laid that commenced pumping on 26 October, and it remained in action until the end of the war.

Boulogne had poor railway facilities, so the pipeline was connected to an overland one to Calais where better railway connections were available. This extension was completed in November. By December, nine 3-inch and two 2-inch Hamel pipelines and four 3-inch and two 2-inch Hais cable pipelines had been laid, a total of 17 pipelines, and Dumbo was providing 1,300 long tons (1,300 t) of petrol per day. The overland pipeline was extended to Antwerp, and then to Eindhoven in the Netherlands, and ultimately to Emmerich in Germany. Three 1,200-long-ton (1,200 t) storage tanks were erected in Boulogne and four 1,200-long-ton (1,200 t) tanks and a 600-long-ton (610 t) tank at Calais.

POL was also moved forward by 10,000 deadweight tons (10,000 deadweight tonnes) of POL barges. The floating bridges over the Seine, with the exception of the ones at Vernon and Elbeuf, were removed to allow for barge traffic. For the same reason, low operational bridges over canals in Belgium and the Netherlands were removed and replaced. Rehabilitation of the canal system involved the raising of sunken barges and removal of other obstructions such as blown bridges, and the repair of damaged locks. Severe weather caused the canals to freeze for a time in January and February 1945.

== Supply and services ==
=== Subsistence ===
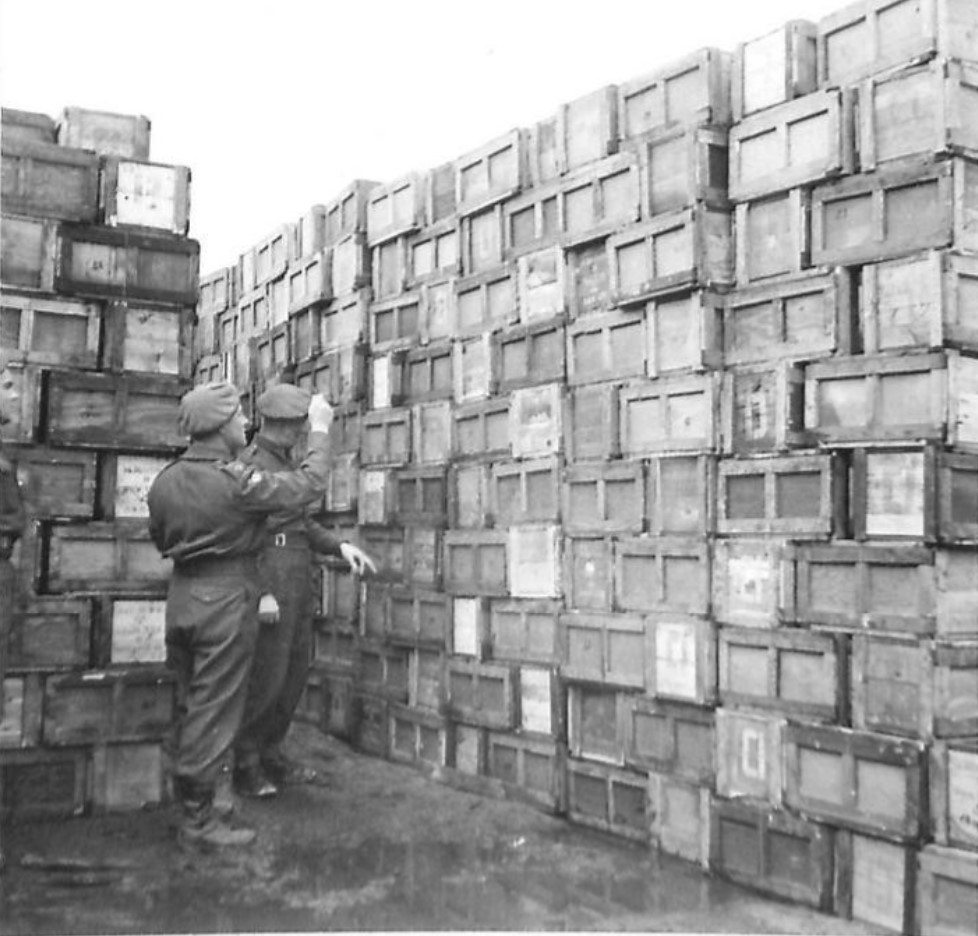
A stack of boxes of rations at an Army dump

Due to the activity of the Allied air forces, few large German supply dumps were captured until Brussels was reached. Large quantities of food were found there, and for a time these made up a large part of the rations issued to the troops. These included what were for the British soldier unusual items such as pork and foods impregnated with garlic, which served to relieve the monotony of the "compo" field ration augmented with bully beef and biscuits. To bring the German rations up to Field Service (FS) ration scale, additional tea, sugar and milk were added.

The advanced base supply organisation around Antwerp was dispersed in three locations, with four base supply depots at Antwerp, five in Ghent and three in Brussels. Large amounts of refrigeration storage were provided for fresh meat and vegetables, which were now routinely issued. Some ration items now arrived directly from the United States without the double handling inherent in being first landed in the UK. By the end of 1944, the base had 100,000 long tons (100,000 t) of storage capacity, and held 29 million rations.

There was sufficient cold storage in the base area to meet the needs of the 21st Army Group, and some storage in the UK was released for use in other theatres or war. Eighty refrigerated railway wagons were acquired, but in the cold weather no problem was encountered with moving frozen meat in ordinary covered goods wagons. For Christmas, 300 long tons (300 t) of frozen pork was landed at Ostend in late November. To economise on bakers, who were in short supply, the 21st Army Group reorganised its eight field bakeries into fourteen mobile field bakeries. This provided a nominal increase in bread-making capacity of 152,000 pounds (69,000 kg) per day, while saving 200 bakers. The equipment for the reorganised units was shipped out from the UK.

=== POL ===
A POL depot was opened in Brussels that was supplied by railway tank cars until Antwerp was opened. Antwerp had 300,000 long tons (300,000 t) of POL storage that was shared with the Americans. Ostend became the main port for POL, and it was linked by pipeline to the largest British POL installation at Ghent, where there was 50,000 long tons (51,000 t) of storage capacity. During the advance in September and October, the Canadian First and British Second Armies had mobile refilling centres under their command, but these were transferred to 21st Army Group's control in November. Storage areas for packaged POL were located at Antwerp, where there was 35,000 long tons (36,000 t); at Diest-Hasselt, where 40,000 long tons (41,000 t) were stored; at Ghent, where 35,000 long tons (36,000 t) were kept; and at Brussels, where there was 20,000 long tons (20,000 t).

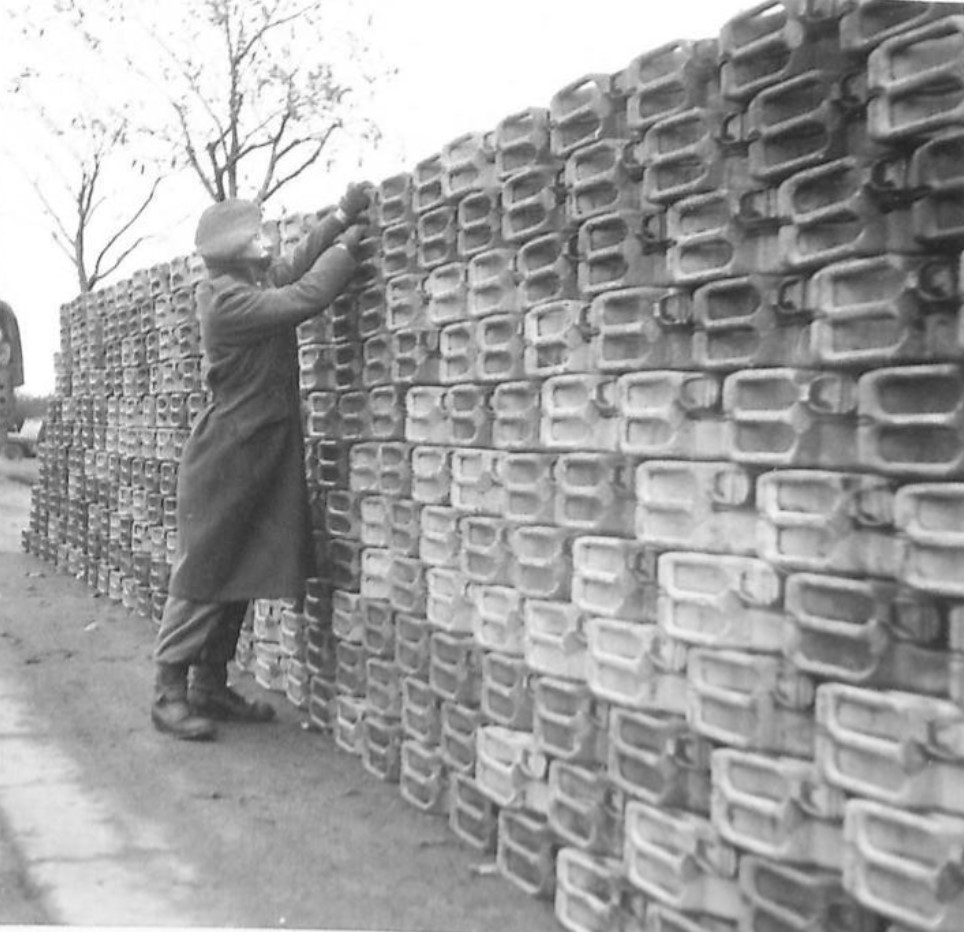
A stack of jerricans containing petrol await collection

During the rapid advance, jerrican discipline was sometimes lax, and it was often necessary to emphasise the importance of returning the cans. Discarded cans were soon appropriated by the civilian population, resulting in a shortage of jerricans that took months to remedy. Stocks in the UK were depleted, and shipments became limited to the production rate of 350 long tons (360 t) per day. To alleviate the shortage, POL was issued to line of communications units in bulk. Refilling stations were established along the line of communications to service road convoys. A salvage drive to reclaim jerricans recovered over a million of them. By the end of 1944, the 21st Army Group held stocks of 245,000 long tons (249,000 t) of packaged and bulk POL, representing 58 days' supply. More was held in the army roadheads and FMCs. The filling centre at Rouen was too far back, which meant mobile filling stations were established at the army roadheads. They were withdrawn from army control in November and placed under that of the 21st Army Group.

The War Office held a reserve of 30,000 long tons (30,000 t) of petrol in non-returnable 4-imperial-gallon (18 L) flimsy tins. To alleviate the September packaged fuel shortage, these were shipped to the 21st Army Group. Jerricans were issued in preference though, and were entirely used by the armies and in the forward areas because they were more than satisfactory for shipping and handling and loss through leakage was negligible. With jerrican discipline restored, there were concerns that this might be impaired by the circulation of non-returnable containers. The result was that by December, the 21st Army Group's entire stockpile of 20,000 long tons (20,000 t) of packaged fuel was held in flimsies.

During the German occupation of Belgium the Union Pétrolière Belge (UPB) had controlled the Belgian oil companies, and the 21st Army Group retained its services for the distribution of civilian petroleum products. Such activities were limited to essential services only, and demands were met from military stocks. In return, the oil companies allowed the Allies to use their plants and employees.

=== Coal ===
Bulk shipments of coal from the UK commenced in August 1944, and were increased from 60,000 long tons (61,000 t) in September 1944 to 250,000 long tons (250,000 t) per month in early 1945. This tied up 225,000 deadweight tons (229,000 deadweight tonnes) of shipping. The coal sections of the G-4 (logistics) and G-5 (civil affairs) branches of SHAEF were amalgamated, with a US colonel placed in charge and a British lieutenant colonel as his deputy. The coal section swelled until it had over 400 personnel. Some collieries in France and Belgium resumed production in October. The first coal was received from France that month, but rail shipments from Belgium did not commence until November.

A severe coal shortage developed in Belgium in December that threatened to bring the civilian economy and military railway traffic to a standstill. Coal was required for the trains and for many other military purposes, including steam dredges, tugs and floating cranes, power stations, hospitals and bakeries. Units were given an allocation for 4 pounds (1.8 kg) per man per day, although this often had to be supplemented with firewood. These took priority over civilian purposes, such as electricity generation for heating and lighting. Luckily, both the US and British armies used oil for cooking. Severe restrictions were placed on electricity, but these also affected industrial facilities used for military purposes, such as steelworks, footwear, clothing factories and laundries.

The price of a ton of coal at the pithead was 350 Belgian francs (equivalent to US$146 in 2025), but on the black market in Brussels it could fetch 5,000 francs (equivalent to US$2,100 in 2025). This led to large quantities of coal being stolen and sold on the black market. For a time guards had to be posted on mines and trains hauling coal to prevent pilferage. The main bottleneck in Belgian coal production was the availability of wooden pit props, which came from the Ardennes. About 1 long ton (1.0 t) of pit props was required for every 40 long tons (41 t) of coal. Seven of the twelve British and Canadian forestry companies in the theatre were deployed to the Ardennes where there were good quantities of Norway spruce.

At first the problem was the railway link between the Ardennes and the mines. A movement control group was brought out from the UK to coordinate the traffic. No sooner was this resolved than the German Ardennes offensive interrupted the supply, and four of the forestry companies had to be used as infantry. Efforts to locate another source of pit props in Belgium were to no avail, so arrangements were made for pit props to be shipped from the UK. By the time they arrived in January the crisis in the Ardennes had passed, and regular supply was resumed. The production target of 2,000 long tons (2,000 t) of coal per day was met soon thereafter.

=== Supplies ===
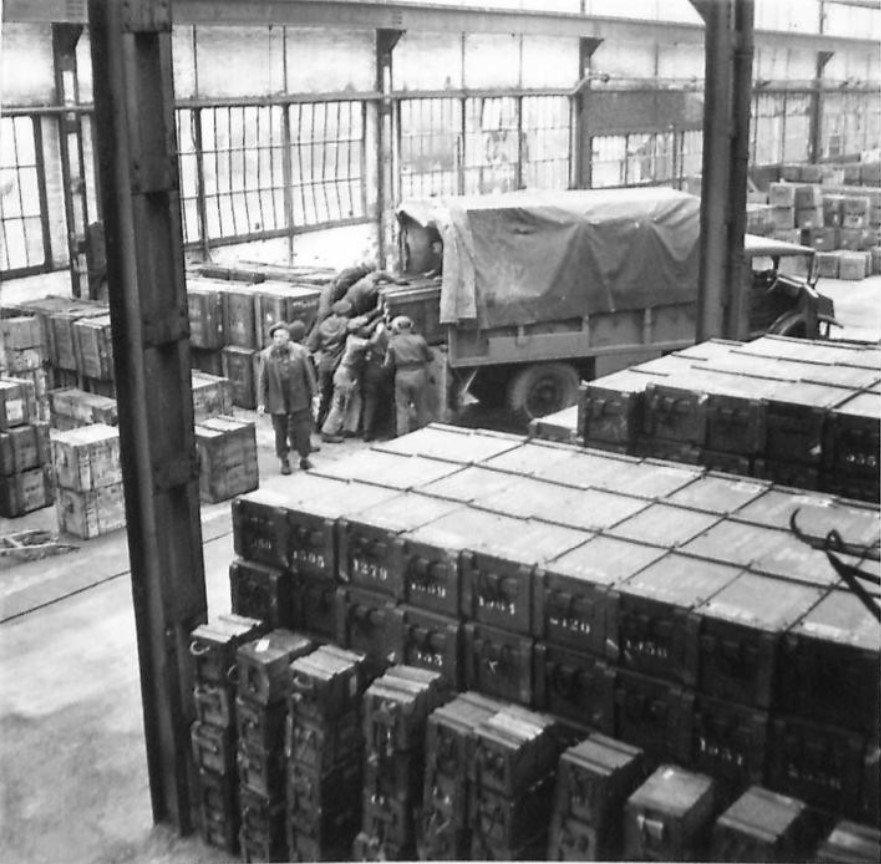
Ammunition being stacked in the ordnance store at No. 8 Army Roadhead

Until Antwerp was opened, ordnance stores arrived through Boulogne, Dieppe and Ostend. Each handled different types of stores, which simplified sorting and forwarding of ordnance stores, 58,000 long tons (59,000 t) of which passed through these ports in the last three months of 1944. The 15th Advance Ordnance Depot (AOD) began its move to the advanced base in September, and requisitioned offices and storehouses in Antwerp. It was joined there by the 17th AOD. Stocking of the new 15th/17th AOD commenced in November, and it opened for issues to the First Canadian Army on 1 January 1945, and the British Second Army ten days later. Finally, on 22 January, it began servicing the whole line of communications. Until then, demands were met from the RMA. The 15th/17th AOD grew to employ 14,500 people, of whom 11,000 were civilians, and occupied 3,500,000 square feet (330,000 m^{2}) of covered and 30,000,000 square feet (2,800,000 m^{2}) of open space. Over 126,000 distinct items were stocked, and 191,000 items were demanded in January.

The 2nd Base Ammunition Depot (BAD) opened in Brussels in October 1944, and after a slow start stocks rose to 75,000 long tons (76,000 t). The 17th BAD opened north of Antwerp towards the end of the year, but its stocking was hampered by V-weapon attacks. Although the tonnage of ammunition was impressive, there were still shortages of it for the field and medium artillery. In late October 1943, stocks of ammunition seemed so high that cutbacks in production had been ordered; the labour saved in the UK had been diverted to aircraft production. On 14 October 1944, the Deputy Chief of the Imperial General Staff, Lieutenant-General Sir Ronald Weeks, wrote to Montgomery, explaining that expenditure of 25-pounder ammunition was exceeding monthly production by 1.5 million rounds per month, and expenditure of medium artillery ammunition was 40 per cent higher than production.

The War Office was therefore obliged to impose quotas on the armies in the field. This primarily affected the Eighth Army in Italy, where major operations had to be postponed until the spring of 1945. An increase in the allotment of ammunition to Italy could only come at the expense of the 21st Army Group, and the War Office was unwilling to do this. The 21st Army Group largely escaped the effects of the shortage. On 7 November, the 21st Army Group restricted usage to 15 rounds per gun per day for field artillery ammunition and 8 rounds per gun per day for medium artillery ammunition, but Montgomery directed that this would apply only during quiet periods, and that stocking of the advanced base would continue until it held 14 days' reserves and 14 days' working margin prescribed by the War Office.

The exigencies of the campaign took their toll on vehicles in wear and tear. A major fault was found with the engines of 1,400 4x4 3-ton Austin K5 lorries, which developed piston trouble. A combination of early frosts and heavy military traffic created numerous potholes in the Dutch and Belgian roads and caused widespread suspension damage to vehicles. Repair work conducted in the advanced base workshops in Brussels and later Antwerp, which were able to take advantage of the static front line and the availability of civilian factories for military workshop spaces to increase their throughput. Civilian garages were also employed to perform repairs.

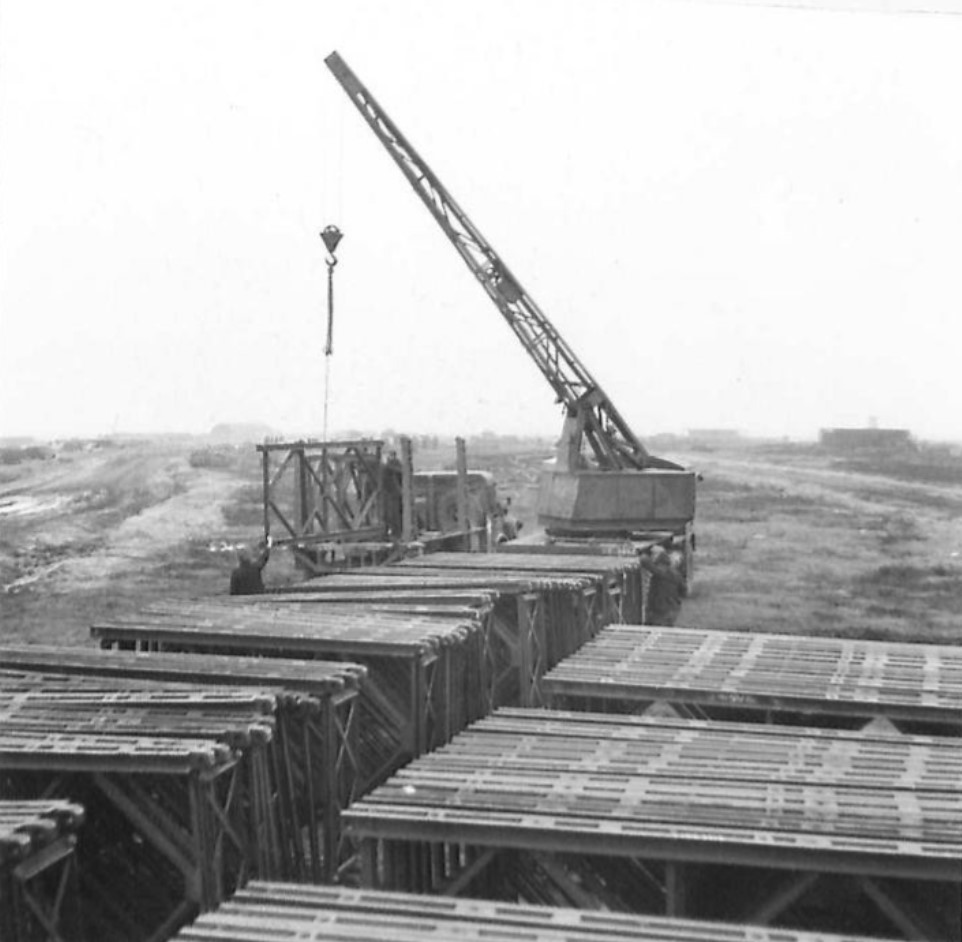
Sections of Bailey Bridges at the No. 8 Army Roadhead ordnance dump

So many armoured fighting vehicles broke down during the advance in September that the stocks at the RMA and the Armoured Replacement Group (ARG) were almost exhausted. By 27 September, no replacement tanks had arrived for three weeks. Armoured units had only 70 per cent of their unit equipment, and the RMA held only 15 and 5 per cent respectively in stock. Many repairable tanks lay broken down along the road sides awaiting collection by the recovery teams, but these had to move so frequently that it would be some time before repairs could be completed. It was arranged for forty armoured vehicles a day to be shipped to Boulogne in October. The following month LSTs began arriving with tanks at Ostend, and deliveries were split between the two ports, with thirty armoured vehicles arriving at Ostend and twenty at Boulogne each every day. Port clearance presented a problem as there was no railway link at Boulogne, so hard-pressed tank transporters had to be used. By October there were nine tank transporter companies, of which one was allotted to the Canadian First Army, three to the British Second Army, and five were retained under 21st Army Group control. The average tank transporter travelled about 68 miles (109 km) per day. In December a shortage of heavy truck tyres caused four of the companies to be taken off the road and used only in emergencies.

At Ostend, there was a rail link, but also a shortage of warflat wagons suitable for carrying tanks. The tank shipments absorbed all the available motor transport shipping to forward ports, so other vehicles were shipped to the RMA at the rate of about 250 per day. After Antwerp was opened, shipments through it averaged 30 armoured vehicles and 200 to 300 other vehicles per day. It was found that the two armoured fighting vehicle servicing units were insufficient to cope with the numbers of replacement tanks, so the brigade workshop of the disbanded 27th Armoured Brigade was employed to service tanks alongside the Second Army Delivery Squadron. In December, the establishment of the armoured troops was changed to two Sherman Firefly tanks armed with the more effective 17-pounder and one Sherman tank armed with the old 75 mm gun; previously the ratio had been the reverse.

Two new armoured vehicles were received during the campaign, the American Landing Vehicle Tracked, which was used to equip the 5th Assault Regiment of the 79th Armoured Division in September, and was employed in the amphibious operations on the Scheldt and the British Comet tank, which was issued to the 29th Armoured Brigade of the 11th Armoured Division in December. A reversion to using British tanks was prompted by a critical shortage of Sherman tanks in the US Army, which caused deliveries to the British Army to be cut back severely in September and October, and then suspended entirely in November and December. The re-equipment of the 29th Armoured Brigade was interrupted by the German Ardennes offensive, and the brigade was hastily issued with its old Shermans and sent to hold the crossings on the Meuse between Namur and Dinant. The re-equipment process was carried out in January 1945, and the surplus Sherman Fireflies were issued to other units, further reducing the number of Shermans armed with the 75 mm gun.

During the German Ardennes offensive, the American depots ceased accepting shipments from Antwerp, as they were threatened by the German advance and might have to relocate at short notice, but the ships continued to arrive. With no depots in the Antwerp area, American stores piled up on the quays. By Christmas, railway traffic had come to a standstill, with trains held up as far back as Paris and Le Havre. An emergency administrative area was created around Lille, where American traffic would not interfere with the British line of communications. The German offensive also raised fears for Brussels' water supply, which would have fallen into German hands had they reached the Meuse between Huy and Dinant. The German Ardennes offensive prompted a request from the US Communications Zone on 26 December for an emergency delivery of 351 Sherman tanks to the US 12th Army Group. These were drawn from the depots and the radios replaced with US patterns. Tank transporters were used to move 217 tanks, with the other 134 despatched by rail. The US forces were also loaned a hundred and six 25-pounders, 78 artillery trailers and thirty 6-pounder anti-tank guns, along with stocks of ammunition.

=== Services ===
Civilian labour was employed to enable military personnel to be released for service in forward areas. By the end of 1944, some 90,000 civilians were employed by the 21st Army Group, half of them by the Royal Engineers or in the Royal Electrical and Mechanical Engineers workshops in the advanced base. Assistance from the Belgian government came from its Office of Mutual Aid (OMA). Similar arrangements were made with the governments of France and the Netherlands.

Civilians employed by the 21st Army Group
Date	France	Belgium	Netherlands	Total
6 October 1944	9,322	9,073	739	19,134
1 November 1944	12,315	24,900	2,241	39,456
1 January 1945	14,477	64,753	11,489	90,719

Local purchasing and production saved both time and shipping space. Locally-produced items included 350,000 extended end connectors ("duckbills") for tank tracks to improve the mobility of tanks on soft ground and in the snow. The OMA also established a tyre repair organisation. Civilian workers were paid by their national governments under mutual aid, but the offer of a free British Army meal proved to be the greatest attraction. A reluctance to undertake outdoor activities was overcome by issues of surplus military clothing and footwear, but by far the biggest disincentive was the German V-weapons. In addition to civilian labour, the Dutch and Belgian governments organised 24 Belgian and 12 Dutch labour units to assist the Royal Pioneer Corps. The first six Belgian units joined the 21st Army Group in December. These units were equipped and clothed by the British Army, and their national governments granted permission for their employment in Germany when the time came.

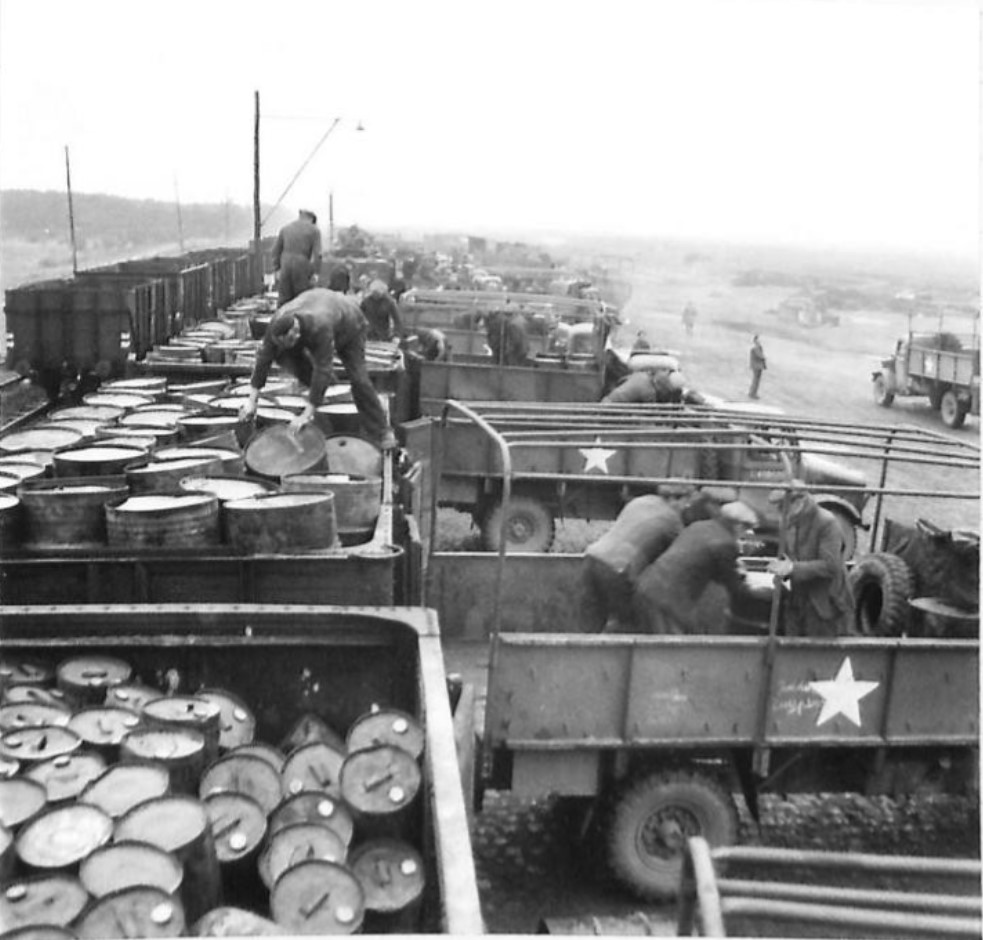
Belgian civilians load drums of oil onto lorries at No. 8 Army Roadhead

Another potential source of labour were the vast numbers of prisoners of war, and there were more of them than could be gainfully employed. By the end of December, the 21st Army Group had captured approximately 240,000 prisoners, of whom 170,000 had been moved to the UK. Due to an agreement between the US and UK dating back to the North African campaign, prisoners of war were divided evenly between the US and UK and 100,000 prisoners were transferred from US to British control. In October the War Office announced that it was cutting back on the numbers of prisoners that it would accept in the UK, and prisoner of war camps in north-west Europe then became overcrowded. Two more camps were established, which were staffed by personnel sent by the War Office. Still, the overcrowding persisted, and it was anticipated that large numbers of prisoners would be captured when major offensive operations resumed in February 1945.

Once it became clear that a rapid advance into Germany would not occur and that the 21st Army Group would remain in northern Belgium and the southern Netherlands for a considerable period of time, work commenced on preparations for the winter. Winterisation, which included the supply of warm clothing for the troops, the establishment of covered storage for supplies, and the improvement of airfields to handle the conditions, absorbed 750,000 long tons (760,000 t) of import tonnage. Huts were required to accommodate 200,000 personnel, and 1,250,000 square feet (116,000 m^{2}) of covered space was needed for other purposes. Camps were established for 100,000 refugees and prisoners of war, and a transit camp for 2,600 troops was created at Calais. Large numbers of anti-aircraft units were based around Antwerp to protect the port and installations and over 1,000 camps were built for anti-aircraft battery and searchlight positions.

No. 83 Group RAF alone required nearly 700 huts to accommodate 12,000 personnel. Orders were placed with civilian firms for 1,000 Nissen huts in November and 5,000 per month thereafter, but their work was hampered by the shortage of coal and the availability of timber. Air bases were constructed and improved by four airfield construction wings of the Airfield Construction Branch RAF. Getting them ready for winter involved the repair of concrete runways, the erection of hangars, the construction of accommodation, and the preparation of 100,000 square feet (9,300 m^{2}) of hard standings where stores could be unloaded from aircraft onto lorries. From December, considerable effort was devoted to keeping the runways and taxiways clear of snow and ice, for which local rock salt was used. The first Fog Investigation and Dispersal Operation (FIDO) system outside the UK was installed at Épinoy. This consumed 90,000 imperial gallons (410,000 L) of petrol each night.

=== Medical ===
It was highly undesirable for hospitals to be under canvas during winter. Six general hospitals in the RMA that had become redundant were shipped back to the UK until adequate accommodation could be provided for them in the advanced base area. This was accomplished by taking over existing civilian and German military hospitals, and converting schools and convents into hospitals. Hospitals were built at Antwerp, Louvain (Leuven), Ostend, Bruges and Dieppe. By 7 January there were 29,000 hospital beds in the 21st Army Group.

The move of troops from bivouacs to billets and buildings was accompanied by a rise in the incidence of colds and respiratory diseases. The rate of trench foot was low, with just twelve cases in November and fourteen in December. In all, 206 cases of trench foot or frostbite were recorded among the British and Canadian armies during the winter of 1944, compared with 71,000 in the American armies. This was attributed to awareness and good man management by regimental officers. The wet and cold climate of winter in the British Isles, and the experience of the Great War had made the British Army extremely conscious of the importance of taking care of feet, and it was incorporated into the training regimen. American observers noted that when the British soldier was told to do something, he did it. A policy was laid down that no soldier should be kept in the front line for more than 48 hours at a time in the winter, and efforts were made to find warm and dry billets when they were out of the line. The British Battledress was warmer than the American equivalent, and each soldier had a warm sleeveless leather jerkin. There was an issue of additional pairs of socks to the troops, and the design of the boots allowed for two pairs of socks to be worn in cold weather. The construction of the soles of the boots made them more waterproof than American boots.

Contact with the civilian population, especially after the leave in Belgium and the Netherlands began, led to a rise in venereal disease cases from 1.08 per thousand troops in October to 3.06 per thousand in December. There was also an increase in cases of scabies and pediculosis. The rate of hospital admissions rose from 22.4 per 1,000 personnel in October to 24.3 in November, and 28.0 in December.

== Outcome and legacy ==
21st Army Group stockpile holdings 30 November 1944
	Advanced base		Channel ports		RMA	
	long tons	tonnes	long tons	tonnes	long tons	tonnes
Supplies	15,000	15,000	31,000	31,000	11,000	11,000
POL	79,000	80,000	27,000	27,000	26,000	26,000
Ammunition	32,000	33,000	Nil	Nil	25,000	25,000

With Antwerp open, it was decided to shut down the RMA, where some 300,000 long tons (300,000 t) of supplies were still held. This included 15,000,000 rations, which were gradually eaten by the troops in the RMA. The last shipment of supplies to the RMA, except for fresh meat and vegetables, was made at the end of October. Stores still required by the 21st Army Group were moved forward to the new advanced base around Antwerp, and the rest returned to the War Office for disposal. Each day 200 long tons (200 t) were moved forward by road and the same amount by rail, and towards the end of November a coaster service commenced which moved 2,500 long tons (2,500 t) per day to Antwerp by sea.

Troops stationed south of the Seine continued to draw provisions from stocks in the RMA, while those in France north of the Seine were provisioned through the Channel ports. By the end of December only 670 long tons (680 t) of ammunition remained in the RMA, but half of the ordnance and engineering stores still had to be moved forward. The Mulberry harbour had been damaged by the autumn gales, and winterisation work there ceased in October. It was closed for good in November, and work commenced on dismantling it.

Through American Lend-Lease, British logistics in this campaign had access to enormous resources. The system for using it effectively had been developed and honed in earlier campaigns in North Africa and Italy. The procedures that had been developed there were improved upon as administrative staffs gained experience, and a high degree of efficiency resulted. The problem the administrative staffs faced was not whether something could be accomplished, but how soon it could be done, and what the ramifications would be. The maintenance system had both capacity and flexibility, and was capable of supporting both the fast-moving operations involved in the sweep through northern France and Belgium in September and the slow-tempo operations involved in the capture of Antwerp in October. The responsiveness of the logistical system allowed operational successes to be exploited and difficulties to be overcome. Formations were permitted to demand whatever they felt they required without question. The dangers of over-supply were demonstrably less than the shortcomings inherent in a less flexible and responsive logistical system.

On 15 January, with the German Ardennes offensive over, the 21st Army Group began preparations for Operation Veritable. The 21st Army Group would drive through the Reichswald, force a crossing of the Rhine, and advance into Germany. From an administrative perspective, this would be much simpler than the breakout from the lodgement area in 1944 due to the work that had been carried out between September 1944 and the end of the year. A well-developed base was available to support these operations, railheads extended into the forward areas, supplies had been stockpiled, and transport was available. This time the 21st Army Group would not be held back by logistical constraints.

One of the legacies of this operation was the post-war use of British locomotives on the continent. In particular, the WD locomotives 2-8-0, 2-10-0 and 0-6-0 ST's numbered some 324 by 1946. Many were purchased by the French, Dutch and Belgian state railways, and of these the larger engines saw much use, particularly with the Dutch Nederlandse Spoorwegen. A WD Austerity 2-10-0 73755 Longmoor which was the 1,000th British built steam locomotive to be ferried to Mainland Europe in support of the British Army is now preserved at the Railway Museum in Utrecht.
