= Quenast quarry =

- Location in Belgium
- Location: Quenast, Belgium; 50°39′53″N 4°9′20″E
- Type: Porphyry quarry
- Company: Sagrex of Heidelberg Materials

The Quenast quarry (French: Carrière de Quenast) or Porphyry quarries of Quenast is a historic porphyry deposit in Belgium and Europe's largest open-pit quarry. Porphyry has been mined from the quarry as an important source for construction since the 17th century and was traditionally used to make Belgian cobblestones for city streets.

== History ==
In the village of Quenast, 29 km (18 mi) from Brussels and within Rebecq, Walloon Brabant, the quarry covers 140 ha (350 acres) and reaches a depth of 125 m (410 ft).

The porphyry material, formed beneath the tertiary rocks in Brabant during the Silurian period, is of volcanic origin and known for its extreme toughness. Belgian porphyry was traditionally made into cobblestones or paving stone. This material was used for paving and road construction, with exports to cities across Europe and globally, including heavy use in the streets of Paris. In 1705, the States of Brabant constructed the Brussels-Mons road with stones sourced from the quarry, according to records.

The material extracted from the quarry was moved along a 55 km (34 mi) railway, linking with the main line at Tubize.

In 1844, entrepreneur Joseph-Emmanuel Zaman began unifying the porphyry quarries under a single ownership, transforming them into one of Belgium's most significant industrial enterprises. Zaman's company, Zaman & Co., operated six of the seven active pits by 1860. On August 12, 1864, the Porphyry Quarries Company of Quenast (French: Société Anonyme des Carrières de Porphyre de Quenast) acquired the business and purchased a larger part of the tract.

An experiment was held in 1872 at the Quenast quarry to test lithofracteur and assess its usefulness for the mining industry and military engineering. McKean and Co.'s Rock Drill was operational at the Quenast quarry in 1875.

The porphyry extracted from the quarry at Quenast was frequently used for paving in Berlin, Bordeaux, Cologne, Dunkirk, The Hague, Lille, Paris, and Rotterdam in the 1880s. As of 1887, the quarry in Belgium produced 100,000 paving setts a day. By 1899, the quarries functioned as a cooperative association, allowing workmen to share in a yearly dividend.

Amid World War I in 1914, the Quenast porphyry quarry was abandoned. In 1919, the S.S. Quenast arrived in the River Thames with its first shipment of macadam from the quarry since the outbreak of war.

By 1969, the 400-year-old quarry was supplying stone for the Delta Works, an extensive Dutch flood defence system.
