= Steam locomotives of British Railways =

Steam locomotives used under British Railways (1948 - 1968)

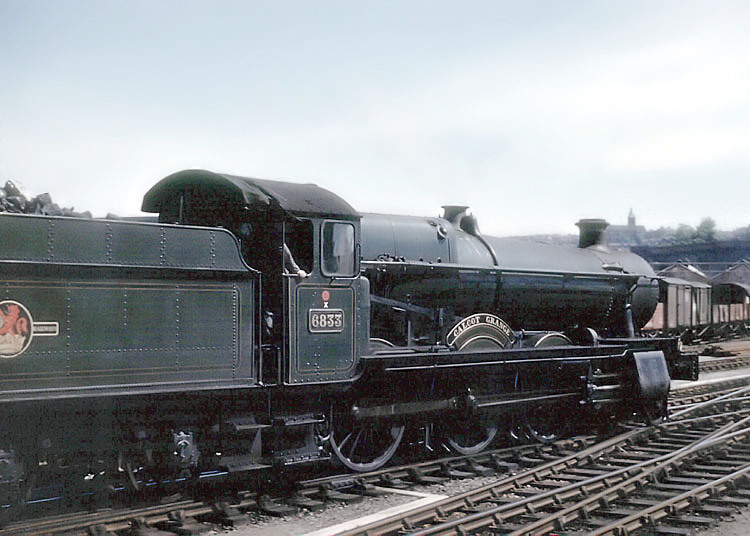
ex-Great Western Railway No. 6833 Calcot Grange, a 4-6-0 Grange class steam locomotive, at Bristol Temple Meads railway station

The steam locomotives of British Railways were used by British Railways over the period 1948–1968. The vast majority of these were inherited from its four constituent companies, the "Big Four".

In addition, BR built 2,537 steam locomotives in the period 1948–1960, 1,538 to pre-nationalisation designs and 999 to its own standard designs. These locomotives had short working lives, some as little as five years, because of the decision to end the use of steam traction by 1968, against a design life of over 30 years and a theoretical final withdrawal date of between 1990 and 2000.

== Background ==
British Railways was created on 1 January 1948 principally by the merger of the "Big Four" grouped railway companies: the Great Western Railway (GWR), the London, Midland and Scottish Railway (LMS), the London and North Eastern Railway (LNER) and the Southern Railway (SR). It inherited a wide legacy of locomotives and rolling stock, much of which needed replacing due to the ravages of World War II.

== Locomotives inherited from constituent companies ==
A wide variety of locomotives was acquired from the four major constituent companies. These had generally standardised their own designs. See:

- Locomotives of the Great Western Railway
  specifically List of GWR locomotives as of 31 December 1947
- Locomotives of the Southern Railway
  specifically List of Southern Railway locomotives as of 31 December 1947
- Locomotives of the London, Midland and Scottish Railway
  specifically List of LMS locomotives as of 31 December 1947
- Locomotives of the London and North Eastern Railway
  specifically List of LNER locomotives as of 31 December 1947

In addition, a handful of locomotives were inherited from minor constituents.

The 1948 Locomotive Exchange Trials compared locomotives from each company against each other.

== Classification ==
After initially using letter prefixes (E for ex-LNER, M for ex-LMS, S for ex-SR, and W for ex-GWR locomotives, as used for other inherited rolling stock), a numbering scheme was decided on in March 1948. Generally ex-GWR locomotives retained their numbers (and hence were able to retain their cast brass number plates) and it was decided to add 30000 to the Southern numbers, 40000 to the LMS numbers and 60000 to the LNER numbers. There were some exceptions though.

BR adopted a slightly modified version of the LMS classification system, itself based on the Midland Railway's system. Each locomotive class was given a number 0–9 that signified its power, 0 for the least powerful and 9 for the most, with a suffix of F or P, indicating freight and passenger roles respectively. Freight power ranged from 0–9, passenger from 0–8. Many locomotives were used for both roles, in which case they were given two class numbers, the P-rating first e.g. 3P4F or 6P5F. A slight change from the LMS system saw those where the freight classification (x) equalled the passenger classification (also x) reclassified as xMT, MT standing for mixed-traffic, e.g. for the LMS Black Five locomotives, LMS 5P5F became BR 5MT. Mixed traffic locomotives had power in the range of classes 2–6.

== Locomotives acquired from the War Department ==
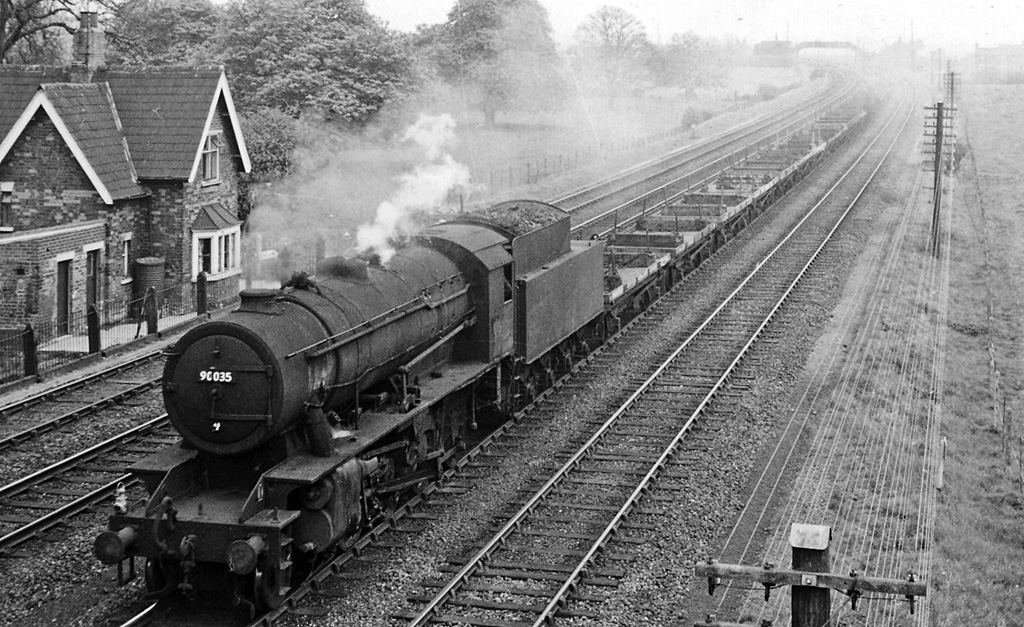
553 ex-WD Austerity 2-8-0s were acquired from the War Department. 90035 was one of them.

In addition to the inherited and new-build locomotives, B.R. also purchased 620 locomotives of three types from the War Department. These had been in use on railways in Great Britain and elsewhere in Europe during the Second World War. For two of these types, BR was adding to two classes it already had. BR had inherited 556 ex-LMS Stanier Class 8F 2-8-0s, and added 39 in 1949 and an additional three in 1957, bringing the class total to 666. Additionally, it had acquired 200 ex-LNER Class O7 2-8-0s of the WD Austerity 2-8-0 type, to which it added another 533 examples.

The ex-LNER locomotives were later renumbered from the ex-LNER 6xxxx series into the BR series as 90000-90100, 90422-90520. The third type, of which it had no other examples, were the 25 of the WD Austerity 2-10-0s. Of the eight WD ex-LMS Fowler Class 3F 0-6-0Ts exported to France, the five survivors were repatriated in 1948, and resumed their original numbers in the sequence of LMS Fowler Class 3F locomotives (albeit with the additional 40000 that identified ex-LMS locomotives under BR ownership). The ex-WD Hunslet Austerity 0-6-0STs were ex-LNER Class J94 locomotives and are included in the total of LNER locomotives inherited.

Numbers	BR Class	WD type	Number acquired	Dates acquired	Power class	Wheel arrangement	Notes
47589/607/11/59/60	ex-LMS Fowler Class 3F	WD ex-LMS Fowler Class 3F	5	1948	3F	0-6-0T	
48012 etc., 48773–5	BR Stanier Class 8F	WD / LMS Stanier Class 8F	42	1949, 1957	8F	2-8-0	
90101-421,521-732	BR ex-WD Austerity 2-8-0	WD Austerity 2-8-0	533	1948	8F	2-8-0	Plus another 200 examples of LNER Class O7, later renumbered 90000-100,422-520
90750–74	BR ex-WD Austerity 2-10-0	WD Austerity 2-10-0	25	1948	8F	2-10-0	

== Locomotives built by BR to Big Four designs ==
Initially, the newly nationalised network continued to be run as four different concerns, and pursued the policy of building of well-established designs. Some of these were already quite old, one class (the J72 tank engines) being a Pre-Grouping design.

=== GWR designs ===
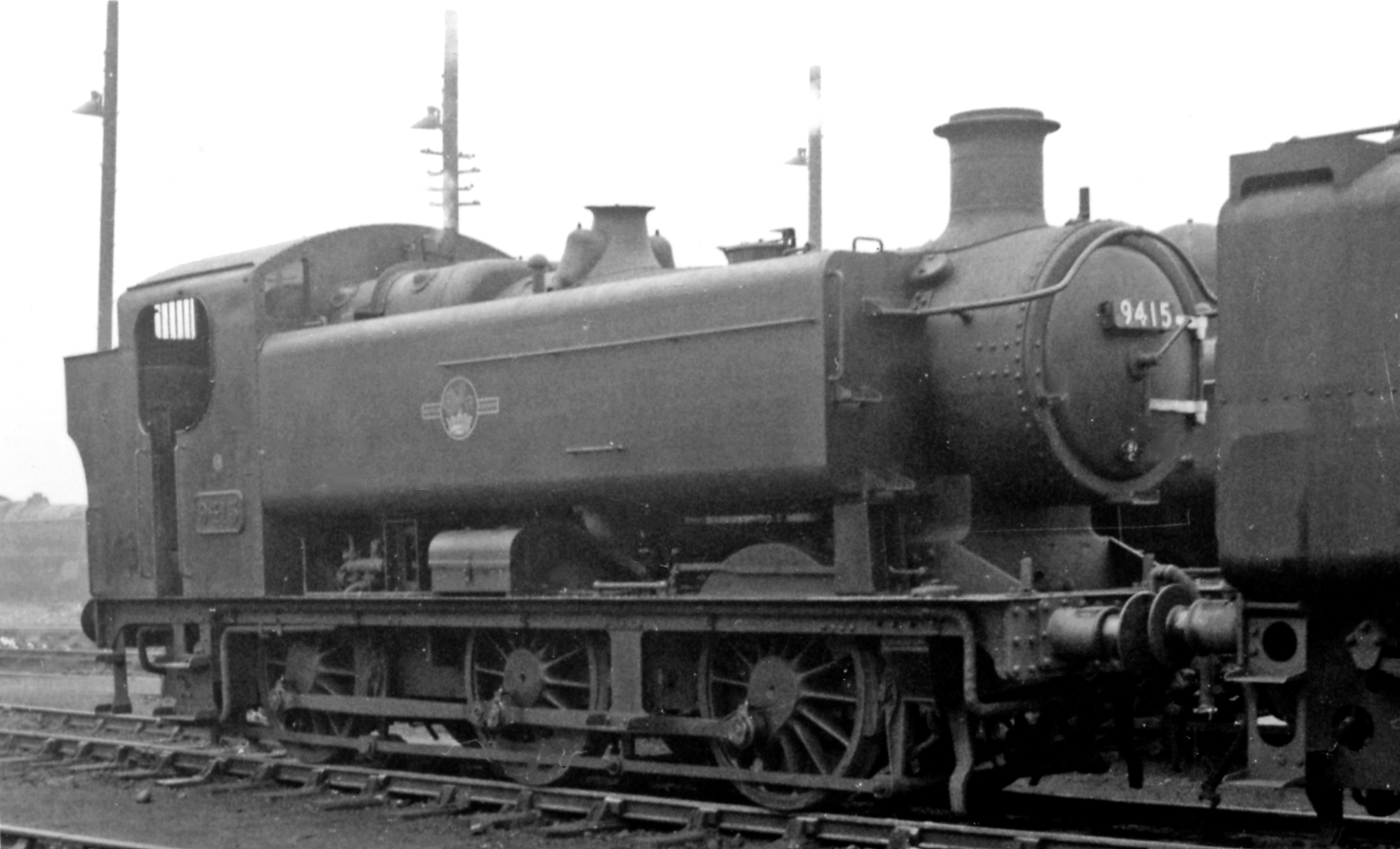
94XX class pannier tank, built by BR.

Great Western management was opposed to nationalisation and built many pannier tanks, resulting in a surplus of them. 452 locomotives were built to ex-GWR designs, of which 341 were pannier tanks.

Class	Numbers	Power Classification	Wheel Arrangement	Number Built	Dates Built
1500	1500–9	4F	0-6-0PT	10	1949
1600	1600–69	2F	0-6-0PT	70	1949–51, 1954
9400	3400–9, 8400–99, 9410–99	4F	0-6-0PT	200	1949–56
2251	3218–9	3MT	0-6-0	2	1948
5101	4160–79	4MT	2-6-2T	20	1948–9
5700	6760–79, 9662–82	3F	0-6-0PT	41	1948–50
6959 "Modified Hall"	6981–99, 7900–29	5MT	4-6-0	49	1948–50
4073 "Castle"	7008–37	7P	4-6-0	30	1948–50
7400	7430–49	2F	0-6-0PT	20	1948, 1950
7800 "Manor"	7820–9	5MT	4-6-0	10	1950
Total				452	1948–56

=== SR designs ===
The SR designs built by BR included 50 Bulleid Pacifics. Many of these were later rebuilt in an un-streamlined form. BR also completed and steamed one of the experimental SR Leader class, but did not take it into stock, and cancelled the remaining orders in various states of completeness.

Class	Numbers	Power Classification	Wheel Arrangement	Number Built	Dates Built
West Country/Battle of Britain	34071–110	7P5F	4-6-2	40	1948–51
Merchant Navy	35021–30	8P	4-6-2	10	1948–9
Total				50	1948–51

=== LMS designs ===
640 locomotives were built to LMS designs. They were built at various BR works, not just at the ex-LMS works at Crewe, Derby and Horwich. Many of the later BR standard designs were based on the LMS designs.

Class	Numbers	Power Classification	Wheel Arrangement	Number Built	Dates Built
Ivatt 2MT 2-6-2T	41210–329	2MT	2-6-2T	120	1948–52
LMS Fairburn 2-6-4T	42050–186, 42190–9	4MT	2-6-4T	147	1948–51
Ivatt 4MT 2-6-0	43003–161	4MT	2-6-0	159	1948–52
Stanier "Black Five"	44658–757	5MT	4-6-0	100	1948–51
Stanier "Coronation"	46257	8P	4-6-2	1	1948
Ivatt 2MT 2-6-0	46420–527	2MT	2-6-0	108	1948–53
Kitson saddle tank	47005–9	0F	0-4-0ST	5	1953–4
Total				640	1948–54

=== LNER designs ===
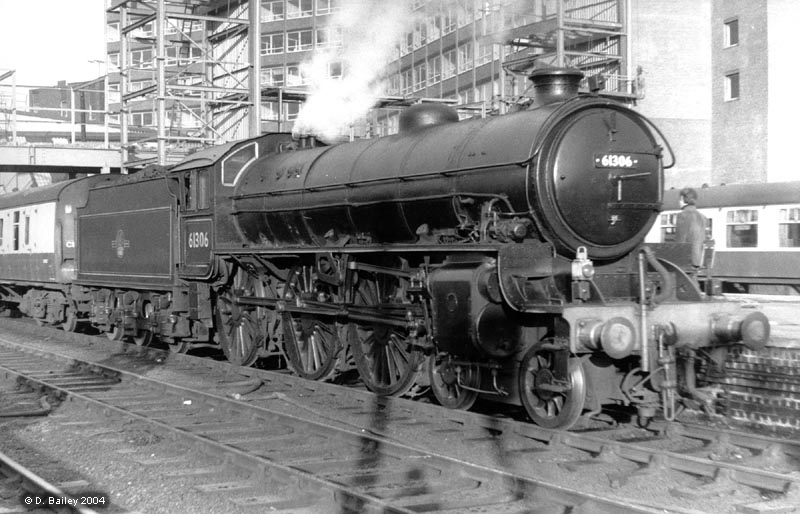
BR-built LNER Thompson Class B1 61306 at Leeds City in 1966 or 1967.

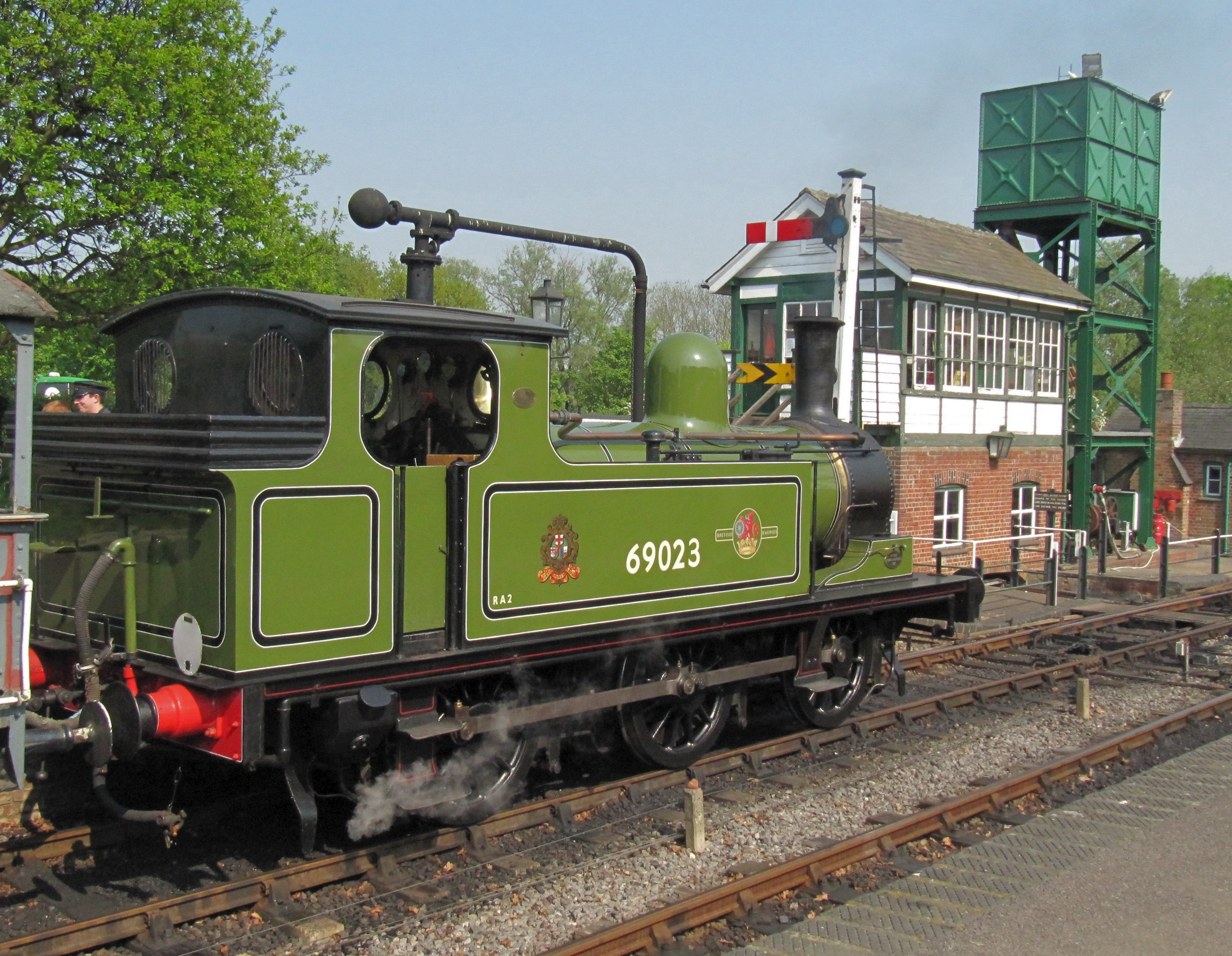
J72 Class 69023 Joem visits the Colne Valley Railway

BR built 396 locomotives to LNER designs. The J72 Class was a North Eastern Railway design, dating from 1898.

Class	Numbers	Power classification	Wheel arrangement	Number built	Dates built
Peppercorn A1	60114–62	8P6F	4-6-2	49	1948–49
Peppercorn A2	60526–39	8P7F	4-6-2	14	1948
Thompson B1	61273–409	5MT	4-6-0	136	1948–52
J72	69001–28	2F	0-6-0T	28	1949–51
Thompson/Peppercorn K1	62001–70	6MT	2-6-0	70	1949–50
Thompson L1	67702–800	4MT	2-6-4T	99	1948–50
Total				396	1948–52

== BR 'Standard' classes ==
From 1951, BR started to build steam locomotives to its own standard designs intended to succeed a disparate number of pre-grouping engines. They were largely based on LMS practice but incorporating ideas and modifications from the other constituent companies and America. Their design was overseen by Robert Riddles.

Characteristic features were taper boilers, high running plates, two cylinders and streamlined cabs.

Although more were ordered, 999 BR "Standards" were constructed: the last, 92220 Evening Star, was built in 1960. Most never achieved their potential service life and were withdrawn in working order.

Riddles put his case for continuing to build steam locomotives in his presidential address to the Institution of Locomotive Engineers in November 1950. He compared capital costs to show that steam was cheaper than the alternatives, though he didn't mention productivity differences, except to say fuel costs did not rank very high relative to total costs. For example, a Class 5 cost £16,000, compared to £78,100 for a 1,600 h. p. diesel, £138,700 for a gas turbine, or £37,400 for electric. He calculated the costs per drawbar horse power as £13 6s (steam), £65 (diesel), £69 7s (turbine) and £17 13s (electric).

Class	Numbers	Power classification	Wheel arrangement	Quantity built	Years built	RA	Tender types	Image
Class 7 (Britannia)	70000–054	7P6F	4-6-2	55	1951–54	8	BR1, BR1A, BR1D	
Class 8 (Duke of Gloucester)	71000	8P	4-6-2	1	1954	8	BR1E until 1957, BR1J thereafter	
Class 6 (Clan)	72000–009	6P5F	4-6-2	10	1952	8	BR1	
Class 5	73000–171	5MT	4-6-0	172	1951–57	7	BR1, BR1B, BR1C, BR1F, BR1G, BR1H	
Class 4 4-6-0	75000–079	4MT	4-6-0	80	1951–57	4	BR2, BR2A	
Class 4 2-6-0	76000–114	4MT	2-6-0	115	1952–57	4	BR2, BR2A, BR1B	
Class 3	77000–019	3MT	2-6-0	20	1953	4	BR2A	
Class 2	78000–064	2MT	2-6-0	65	1952–56	3	BR3	
Class 4 Tank	80000–154	4MT	2-6-4T	155	1951–57	5	—	
Class 3 Tank	82000–044	3MT	2-6-2T	45	1951–53	4	—	
Class 2 Tank	84000–029	2MT	2-6-2T	30	1953–57	3	—	
Class 9F	92000–250	9F	2-10-0	251	1954–60	9	BR1B, BR1C, BD1F, BR1G	
Total				999	1951–60			

== Liveries ==
Initially, BR decided upon blue for the largest passenger types, with GWR-style Brunswick green for passenger locomotives, and LNWR-style lined black for mixed-traffic locomotives. The blue however was quickly dropped and passenger livery for all locomotive classes reverted to green. Towards the end locomotives tended to be painted in lesser liveries, and often this was covered in a layer of grime.

Two logos (or crests) were used during the period. The first logo (1948–1956) was the "Lion and Wheel" (sometimes nicknamed the "Cycling Lion"), showing a lion standing over a spoked wheel upon which the words "British Railways" were displayed. The second logo (1956–1965) featured a lion holding a wheel (which gave rise to the nickname "ferret and dartboard"), sitting in a crown, with the words "British" and "Railways" to left and right. (Passenger stock and certain diesel locomotives used a roundel variant, where the words "British Railways" were in a ring surrounding the crest.) From 1965, the BR Corporate Image and "Double Arrow" logo was adopted, but this logo was not applied to steam locomotives (except on the Vale of Rheidol line).

Certain classes of steam locomotives were barred from working south of Crewe with effect from 1 September 1964 due to clearance issues with the new overhead electrification. Those locomotives affected had a broad yellow band painted diagonally across their cabsides to denote this prohibition.

== Withdrawal ==
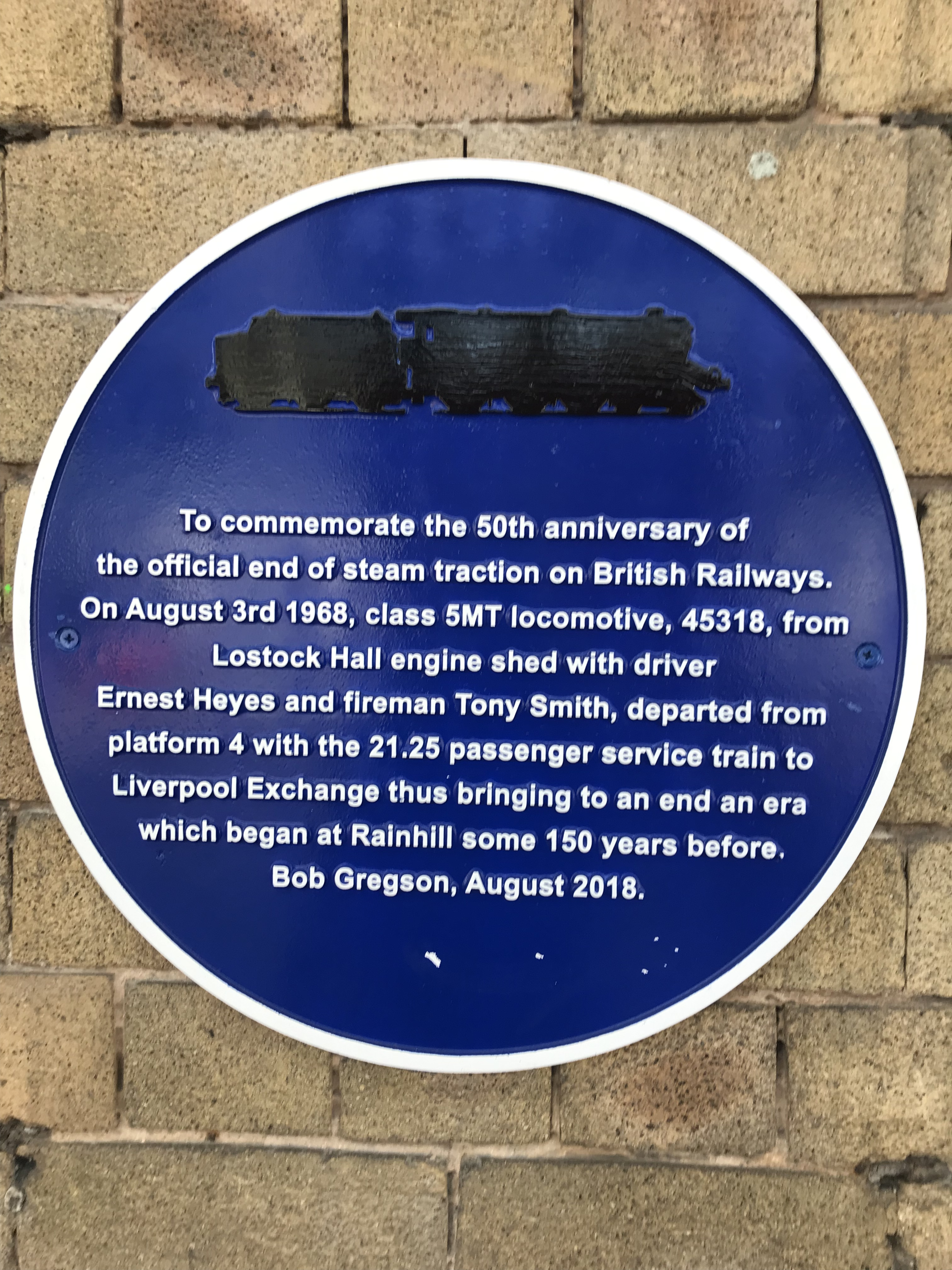
Last Steam commemoration at Preston railway station

The 1955 Modernisation Plan called for the phasing out of steam traction. Major withdrawals occurred during 1962–1966, and steam traction ended in August 1968, coinciding with the Beeching Axe.

Some tank engines were sold to London Transport, where steam traction remained in use until 1971. Steam on industrial lines remained until the 1980s.

With regular maintenance, British steam locomotives typically lasted for approximately 30 years of intensive use, before major components would need to be replaced or overhauled. For a steam locomotive built in 1960, the economic lifespan would have led to it being withdrawn in the 1990s.

== Vale of Rheidol finale ==
The locomotives of the Vale of Rheidol Railway, from the 2 ft narrow gauge Vale of Rheidol Railway (VoR) in Mid-Wales, had been inherited with the rest of the GWR stock in 1948. BR however continued to use steam locomotives on the line as a commercial heritage railway. This situation continued until 1989 when the line was privatised, and steam continued. These engines were the only steam locomotives to receive the Rail Blue with double arrow livery.

== Preservation ==
Withdrawn locomotives were sent for scrap to various locations around the United Kingdom, either to the railway workshops at Brighton in Sussex, Crewe in Cheshire, Darlington in County Durham, Doncaster in South Yorkshire and Swindon in Wiltshire, etc.; or to scrap metal merchants who had been approved to bid on the contracts – these included Woodham Brothers scrapyard in Barry, Vale of Glamorgan, South Wales, which became a centre for the UK railway preservation movement.

Former main line locomotives, along with various smaller industrial shunters, form the backbone of steam motive power for heritage railways. Main line running on charter trains is possible and they run under TOPS code as Class 98.

=== Preserved Locomotives ===
Over 40 BR Standard Locomotives are preserved.

- BR Standard Class 9F/2-10-0 – 9 examples
- BR Standard Class 8 (Duke) – 1 example
- BR Standard Class 7 (Britannia) – 2 examples
- BR Standard Class 5/5MT – 5 examples
- BR Standard Class 4/4-6-0 – 6 examples
- BR Standard Class 4/2-6-0 – 4 examples
- BR Standard Class 4 Tank – 15 examples
- BR Standard Class 2/2-6-0 – 3 examples (briefly there was a 4th)

== Contemporary replicas ==
In addition to the preserved ex-BR Standard Class locomotives, three new-build projects are currently underway.

=== 2MT 2-6-2T 84030 ===
On the Bluebell Railway, Barry scrapyard-condition 2MT 2-6-0 No.78059 is being used as the basis for a new built 2MT 2-6-2T, to be numbered 84030. None of the 78xxx class was ever allocated to, or regularly worked on, the Southern Region, so the decision was taken to convert this locomotive to the tank engine (2-6-2T) version, of which none now exist.

=== 3MT 2-6-2T 82045 ===
The 82045 Steam Locomotive Trust is part way through building a brand new example of the 3MT tank engine, currently under construction at Bridgnorth on the Severn Valley Railway.

=== 6MT 4-6-2 72010 Clan 'Hengist' ===
The 'Clan' Project is constructing a new-build 6MT 4-6-2, to be numbered No. 72010. Following the naming sequence planned by British Railways before the cancellation of the second batch of Clan class locomotives, the locomotive will be named Hengist. Final assembly of the locomotive is aimed to be completed at the Great Central Railway prior to career on both the mainline and heritage railways.

== See also ==
For a list of Diesel and Electric locomotives of British Railways:

- List of British Rail classes
- Motive power depot
- List of British Railways shed codes
