= BR standard classes =

Effort to standardise locomotives in 1951

The BR Standard steam locomotives were an effort to standardise locomotives from the motley collection of older pre-grouping locos. Construction started in 1951. Due to the controversial British Railways Modernisation Plan of 1955, where steam traction was abandoned in favour of diesel and electric traction, many of the locomotives' working lives were very short: between 7 and 17 years. Many have been preserved, mainly due to being sent to Barry Scrapyard.

== Ex-WD Austerity engines ==
The first BR standards were the BR ex-WD Austerity 2-8-0 and BR ex-WD Austerity 2-10-0s. They were given the numbers 90000-732 and 90750-774 respectively. They were assigned the boiler types BR10 and BR11, and both had the tender type BR5.

== Background ==
Robert Riddles put his case for continuing to build steam locomotives in his presidential address to the Institution of Locomotive Engineers in November 1950. He compared capital costs to show that steam was cheaper than the alternatives, though he did not mention productivity differences, except to say fuel costs did not rank very high relative to total costs. For example, a Class 5 cost £16,000, compared to £78,100 for a 1,600 h. p. diesel, £138,700 for a gas turbine, or £37,400 for electric. He calculated the costs per drawbar horse power as £13 6s (steam), £65 (diesel), £69 7s (turbine) and £17 13s (electric). Riddles retired in 1953.

=== Design ===
From 1951, BR started to build steam locomotives to its own standard designs, which were largely based on LMS practice but incorporating ideas and modifications from the other constituent companies, continental Europe and North America. Their design was overseen by Riddles.

Characteristic features were taper boilers, high running plates, two cylinders and streamlined cabs.

== Construction ==
Although more were ordered, 999 BR "Standards" were constructed: the last, 92220 Evening Star, was built in 1960. Most never achieved their potential service life and were withdrawn in working order.

Construction was split between the ex-LMS works at Crewe, Derby and Horwich, the ex-LNER works at Darlington and Doncaster, the ex-GWR works at Swindon, and the ex-SR works at Brighton.

Class	Numbers	Power class	Wheel arr.	Quantity built	Dates built	RA	Tenders types
Class 7 (Britannia)	70000–70054	7MT	4-6-2	55	January 1951–September 1954	8	BR1, BR1A, BR1D
Class 8 (Duke of Gloucester)	71000	8P	4-6-2	1	May 1954	8	BR1E until 1957, BR1J thereafter
Class 6 (Clan)	72000–72009	6P5F	4-6-2	10	December 1951-March 1952	8	BR1
Class 5	73000–73171	5MT	4-6-0	172	April 1951–June 1957	7	BR1, BR1B, BR1C, BR1F, BR1G, BR1H
Class 4 4-6-0	75000–75079	4MT	4-6-0	80	May 1951–June 1957	4	BR2, BR2A
Class 4 2-6-0	76000–76114	4MT	2-6-0	115	December 1952–November 1957	4	BR2, BR2A, BR1B
Class 3	77000–77019	3MT	2-6-0	20	February 1954 to September 1954	4	BR2A
Class 2	78000–78064	2MT	2-6-0	65	December 1952–November 1956	3	BR3
Class 4 Tank	80000–80154	4MT	2-6-4T	155	June 1951–March 1957	5	—
Class 3 Tank	82000–82044	3MT	2-6-2T	45	April 1952–August 1955	4	—
Class 2 Tank	84000–84029	2MT	2-6-2T	30	July 1953–June 1957	3	—
Class 9F	92000–92250	9F	2-10-0	251	January 1954–March 1960	9	BR1B, BR1C, BR1F, BR1G
Total				999	1951–60		

== Tenders ==
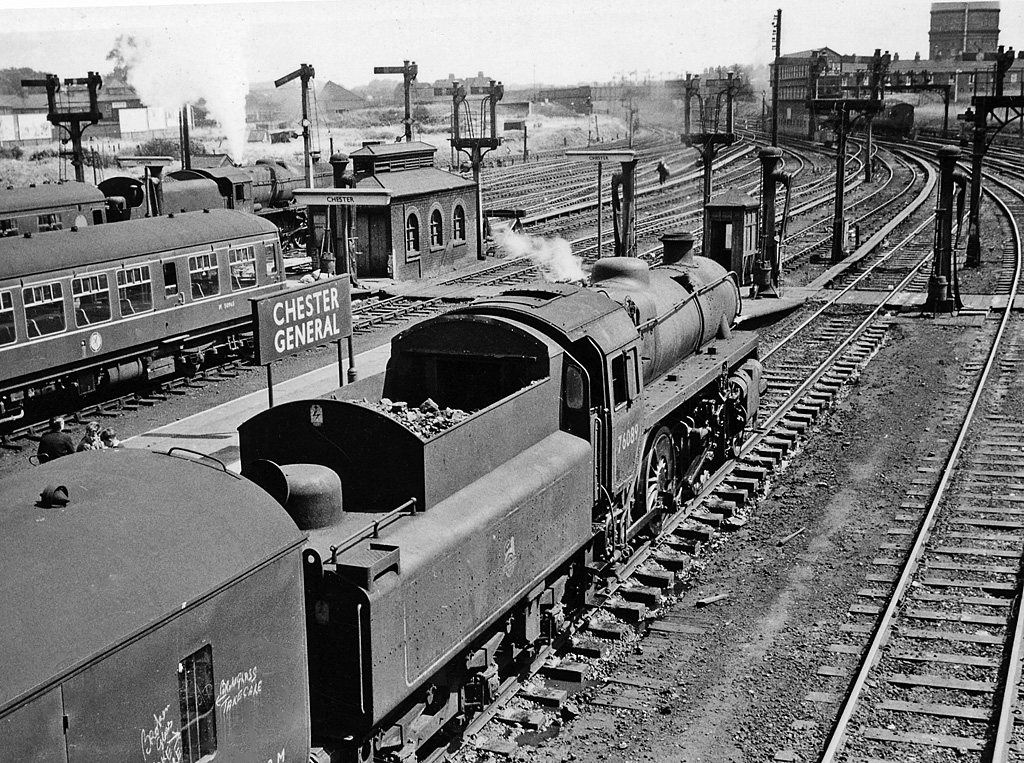
Std 4 2-6-0 number 76089 with a BR2A tender.

The tenders used with the Standard locomotives were also new designs. There were different types due to the use of different coal-to-water ratios, weight restrictions and later improved designs. It was standard practice for there to be fewer tenders than locomotives, as tenders took little time to overhaul compared to locomotives, locomotives entering works for overhaul would tend to lose their tenders to locomotives leaving works after overhaul.

Tender details
Tender Type	Quantity built	Years built	Coal (long tons)	Water (imp.gal.)	Weight full (long tons)	RA	Used with Classes	Notes
BR1	100	1951–53	7	4,250	49.15		8, 7, 6	
BR1A	5	1952	7	5,000	52.50		7	5,000-gallon version of BR1
BR1B	114	1955–57	7	4,725	51.25		5, 4 (4-6-0), 4 (2-6-0), 9F	
BR1C	123	1954–58	9	4,725	53.25		5, 7	9-ton version of BR1B
BR1D	10	1954	9	4,725	54.50		7	BR1C with coal pusher
BR1E	1	1954	10	4,725	55.50		8	10-ton version of BR1D. Rebuilt to BR1C in 1958
BR1F	95	1954–58	7	5,625	55.25		5, 9F	
BR1G	61	1954–60	7	5,000	52.50		5, 9F	BR1A updated with fall plate
BR1H	12	1954	7	4,250	49.15		5	BR1 updated with fall plate
BR1J	1	1958	10	4,325	53.70		8	
BR1K	3	1958	9	4,325	52.35		9F	Fitted with mechanical stokers. Rebuilt to BR1C in 1961
BR2	95	1951–54	6	3,500	42.15		4 (4-6-0), 4 (2-6-0)	
BR2A	88	1954–57	6	3,500	42.15		4 (4-6-0), 4 (2-6-0), 3	BR2 updated with fall plate
BR3	65	1952–56	4	3,000	36.85		2	Updated version of LMS equivalent
Total	773							

== Preservation ==
A total of 46 standards have survived - of these, 38 were rescued from Woodham Brothers scrapyard in Wales. The BR Standard Locomotive Owner's Group provides co-ordination.

Class	No. preserved	Percentage preserved	Numbers	Notes
7 (Britannia)	2	3.6%	70000/13	
8 (Duke of Gloucester)	1	100%	71000	Has Caprotti valve gear
6 (Clan)	0	0%	–	Replica 72010 “Hengist” under construction
5MT	5	2.9%	73050/82/96, 73129/56	73129 has Caprotti valve gear
4MT 4-6-0	6	7.5%	75014/27/29/69/78/79	
4MT 2-6-0	4	3.5%	76017/77/79/84	
3MT 2-6-0	0	0%	–	
2MT 2-6-0	4	6.2%	78018/19/22/59	78059 being rebuilt to a tank version as ‘84030’
4MT 2-6-4T	15	11.6%	80002/64/72/78/79/80/97/98, 80100/04/05/35/36/50/51	
3MT 2-6-2T	0	0%	–	New build 82045 under construction
2MT 2-6-2T	0	0%	–	One being rebuilt from a standard 2-6-0.
9F	9	3.6%	92134, 92203/07/12/14/19/20/40/45	
Total	46	4.6%		

=== New Builds ===
The new build of the 'Clan' class 72010 “Hengist” is progressing steadily. The new build of the Class 3 Tank 82045 is well underway, work continues as of 2021.
