= BR standard class 3 =

BR Standard Class 3 may refer to:

- BR Standard Class 3 2-6-0
- BR Standard Class 3 2-6-2T
