= BR standard class 4 =

BR Standard Class 4 may refer to:

- BR Standard Class 4 4-6-0
- BR Standard Class 4 2-6-0
- BR Standard Class 4 2-6-4T
