= Earnest Cox =

Earnest Cox may refer to:

- Earnest Sevier Cox (1880–1966), American Methodist preacher and racist
- Earnest Stewart Cox (1900–1992), British railway engineer and author

== See also ==
- Ernest Cox (disambiguation)
