= Ernest Cox (disambiguation) =

Ernest Cox (1883–1959) was an English electrical engineer.

Ernest Cox may also refer to:

- Ernest Gordon Cox (1906–1996), English chemist
- Ernest Stewart Cox (1900–1992), British engineer
- Ernie Cox (Canadian football) (1894–1962), Canadian football player
- Ernie Cox (baseball) (1894–1974), American baseball pitcher

== See also ==
- Earnest Cox (disambiguation)
