= Roland Bond =

British locomotive engineer (1903–1980)

Roland C. Bond
- Born: 5 May 1903
- Died: 20 December 1980 (aged 77)
- Education: Tonbridge School
- Engineering career
- Discipline: Locomotive engineer

Roland Curling Bond (5 May 1903 – 20 December 1980) was a British locomotive engineer.

== Biography ==
Bond was born in Ipswich in 1903, and became interested in railways when staying in Yarmouth during the Great War. He was educated at Tonbridge School.

Bond joined the Midland Railway in 1920, from 1923 part of the London, Midland and Scottish Railway (LMS) until 1925. He was an apprentice under Henry Fowler. He then became assistant works manager at the Vulcan Foundry.

In 1931 Bond returned to the LMS, becoming an "assistant works superintendent" at Horwich. In 1933, moved to assistant works superintendent at Crewe. On the outbreak of the World War II in 1939, Bond was sent to Scotland as acting mechanical and electrical engineer, acting for R.A. Riddles. In 1941, he moved back to Crewe to become "works superintendent" and helped drive efficient locomotive and munitions work there.

In 1948, on the formation of the Railway Executive, Bond was appointed chief officer (Locomotive Construction and Maintenance), reporting to Riddles, who was now "Member of the Railway Executive for Mechanical and Electrical Engineering". On the abolition of the Railway Executive in 1953, Bond became chief mechanical engineer, BR Central Staff and later in 1965 general manager, BR Workshops. He was succeeded as Chief Mechanical Engineer in October 1958 by John Frederick (Freddie) Harrison. Bond retired in 1970 and died in 1980, aged 77.

Professional and academic associations
Preceded by John Hereward Pitchford	President of the Institution of Mechanical Engineers; 1963	Succeeded by Vice-Admiral Sir Frank Mason, RN
