= BR Standard Class 9F =

Class of 251 two-cylinder 2-10-0 locomotives

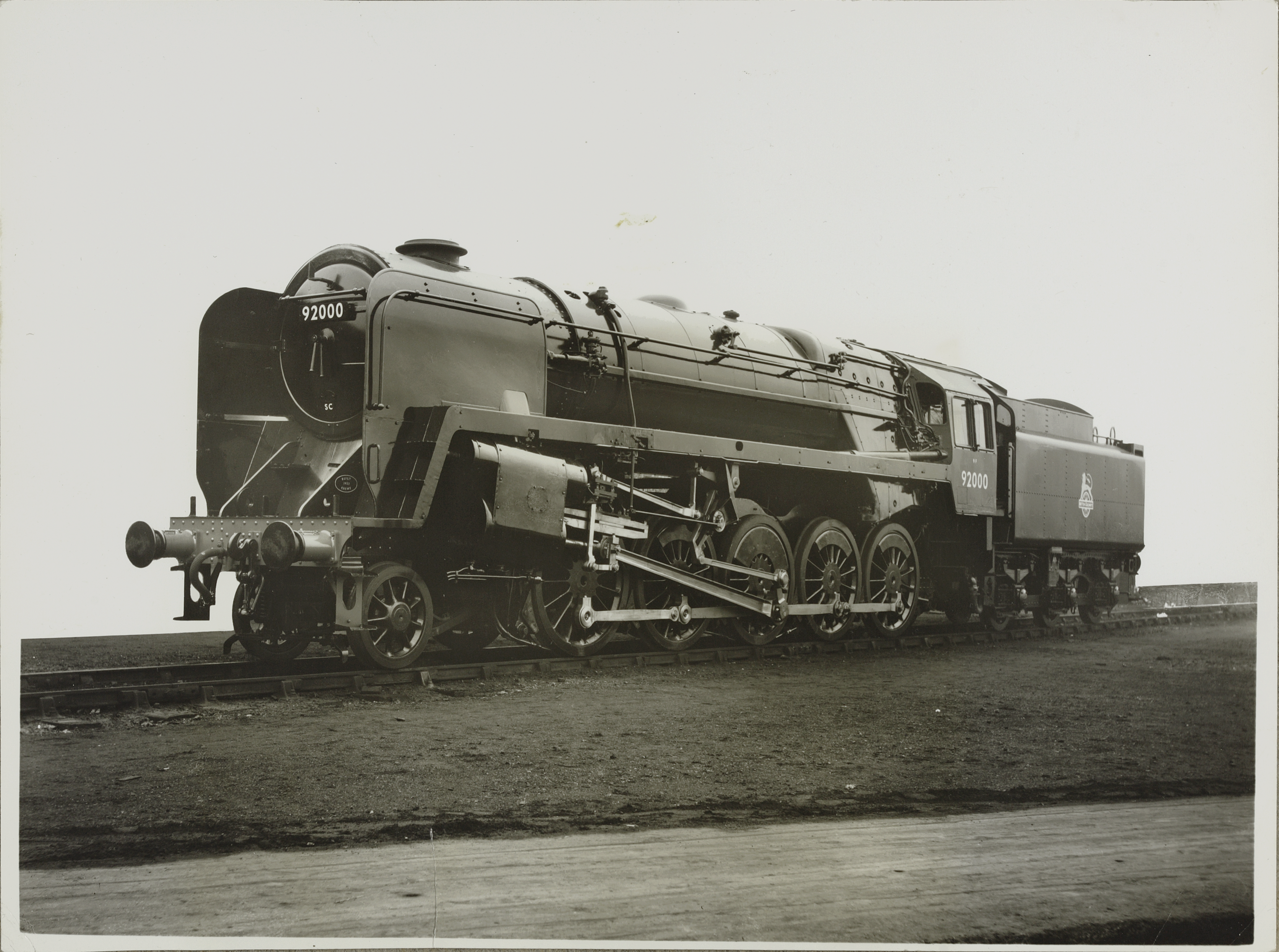
- BR standard class 9F No. 92000 in 1953.
Type and origin
- Power type: Steam
- Designer: Robert Riddles
- Builder: BR Crewe Works (198); BR Swindon Works (53)
- Build date: January 1954 – March 1960
- Total produced: 251
Specifications
- Configuration
  - Whyte: 2-10-0
  - UIC: 1'E h2
- Gauge: 1,435 mm (4 ft 8 1/2 in) standard gauge
- Leading dia.: 3 ft 0 in (0.914 m)
- Driver dia.: 5 ft 0 in (1.524 m)
- Wheelbase: 30 ft 2 in (9.19 m) engine 14 ft 0 in (4.27 m) tender 55 ft 11 in (17.04 m) total
- Length: 66 ft 2 in (20.17 m)
- Axle load: 15.5 long tons (15.7 t; 17.4 short tons)
- Loco weight: 86 long tons 14 cwt (194,200 lb or 88.1 t) to 90 long tons 4 cwt (202,000 lb or 91.6 t)
- Tender weight: BR1B: 50 long tons 5 cwt (112,600 lb or 51.1 t); BR1C: 53 long tons 5 cwt (119,300 lb or 54.1 t); BR1F: 55 long tons 5 cwt (123,800 lb or 56.1 t); BR1G: 52 long tons 10 cwt (117,600 lb or 53.3 t); BR1K: 52 long tons 7 cwt (117,300 lb or 53.2 t)
- Total weight: 139.2 long tons (141.4 t; 155.9 short tons)
- Tender type: BR1B (20); BR1C (85); BR1F (85); BR1G (58); BR1K (3)
- Fuel type: Coal
- Fuel capacity: BR1B/BR1F/BR1G: 7 long tons (7.1 t); BR1C: 9 long tons (9.1 t)
- Water cap.: BR1B: 4,725 imp gal (21,480 L; 5,674 US gal); BR1C: 4,725 imp gal (21,480 L; 5,674 US gal); BR1F: 5,625 imp gal (25,570 L; 6,755 US gal); BR1G: 5,000 imp gal (23,000 L; 6,000 US gal)
- Firebox
  - Grate area: 40.2 sq ft (3.73 m^{2})
- Boiler pressure: 250 psi (1,700 kPa)
- Heating surface
  - Firebox: 210 sq ft (20 m^{2})
  - Tubes and flues: 2,284 sq ft (212.2 m^{2})
- Superheater
  - Heating area: 677 sq ft (62.9 m^{2})
- Cylinders: Two
- Cylinder size: 20 in × 28 in (508 mm × 711 mm)
Performance figures
- Tractive effort: 39,667 lbf (176.45 kN)
Career
- Operators: British Railways
- Power class: 9F
- Numbers: 92000–92250
- Nicknames: Spaceship
- Axle load class: Route availability: 9; BR (WR): blue
- Locale: British Railways: Eastern Region, Midland Region, Scottish Region, Southern Region, Western Region, North Eastern Region
- Withdrawn: May 1964 – June 1968
- Disposition: Nine preserved, remainder scrapped

The British Railways Standard Class 9F 2-10-0 is a class of steam locomotive designed for British Railways by Robert Riddles. The Class 9F was the last in a series of standardised locomotive classes designed for British Railways during the 1950s, and was intended for use on fast, heavy freight trains over long distances. It was one of the most powerful steam locomotive types ever built for British Railways, and successfully performed its intended duties. The 9F class was given the nickname of 'Spaceship', due to its size and shape.

At various times during the 1950s, the 9Fs worked passenger trains with great success, indicating the versatility of the design, sometimes considered to represent the ultimate in British steam development. Several experimental variants were constructed in an effort to reduce costs and maintenance, although these met with varying degrees of success. They were capable of reaching speeds of up to 90 miles per hour (145 km/h).

The total number built was 251, production being shared between Swindon (53) and Crewe Works (198). The last of the class, 92220 Evening Star, was the final steam locomotive to be built by British Railways, in 1960. Withdrawals of the class began in 1964, with the final locomotives being withdrawn from service in 1968, the final year of steam traction on British Railways. Nine examples have survived into the preservation era in varying states of repair, including Evening Star.

O. S. Nock stated "The '9F' was unquestionably the most distinctive and original of all the British standard steam locomotives, and with little doubt the most successful. They were remarkable in their astonishing capacity for speed as well as their work in heavy freight haulage."

== Concept and Construction ==
=== Background ===
The British Transport Commission had proposed that the existing steam locomotive fleet be replaced by both diesel and electric traction. However the board of British Railways, which wanted the railways to be completely electrified, ignored the BTC and ordered a new fleet of 'standard' steam locomotive designs as a stopgap ahead of electrification. Freight was well catered for in terms of locomotive availability after nationalisation in 1948, with a number of heavy freight locomotives built to aid the war effort forming part of British Railways' inheritance. This consisted of 666 LMS 8F Class 2-8-0 and numerous Robert Riddles designed WD Austerity 2-8-0s and WD Austerity 2-10-0s.

It was the Eastern Region's Motive Power officer, L.P. Parker, who made the case for a new design of powerful freight locomotive, able to shift heavy loads at fast speeds in round trips between distant destinations within the eight-hour shift of the footplate crew. Riddles took up the challenge, initially designing a 2-8-2 locomotive, but settled upon the 2-10-0 wheel arrangement for the increased traction and lower axle load that five coupled axles can provide. The resultant design became one of the most successful, but shortest-lived, locomotive classes ever built in Britain.

=== Design features ===
The 9F was designed at both Derby and Brighton Works in 1951 to operate freight trains of up to 900 long tons (910 t; 1,000 short tons) at 35 mph (56 km/h) with maximum fuel efficiency. The original proposal was for a boiler from the BR Standard Class 7 Britannia 4-6-2, adapting it to a 2-8-2 wheel arrangement but Riddles eventually settled upon a 2-10-0 type because it had been used successfully on some of his previous Austerity locomotives. Distributing the adhesive weight over five axles gave a maximum axle load of only 15 long tons 10 cwt (34,700 lb or 15.7 t). The driving wheels were 5 feet 0 inches (1.52 m) in diameter. However, in order to clear the rear coupled wheels, the grate had to be set higher, thus reducing firebox volume. There were many problems associated with such a long wheelbase, but these were solved through a series of design compromises. The centre driving wheels had no flanges, and those on the second and fourth coupled wheels were reduced in depth. This enabled the locomotive to round curves of only 400 feet (120 m) radius. As on all other BR standard steam locomotives, the leading wheels were 3 feet 0 inches (0.91 m) in diameter.

=== Construction history ===
Introduced in January 1954, the class comprised 251 locomotives, of which 53 were constructed at Swindon Works, and 198 at Crewe Works. The locomotives were numbered 92000-92250. The last member of the class was constructed at Swindon in 1960, the 999th "BR Standard" to be constructed, and the last steam locomotive to be built by British Railways. To mark the occasion, a competition was run within the Western Region of British Railways to choose an apt name, and the locomotive was given the name and number of 92220 Evening Star. Many of the class lasted only a few years in service before withdrawal when steam traction ended on the mainline in Britain. Withdrawals of the class from everyday service began in May 1964, and had been completed by June 1968.

Table of orders and numbers
Numbers	Year	Builder	Tender	Notes
92000–09	1954	Crewe	BR1G	8 for WR, 2 for LMR
92010–14	1954	Crewe	BR1F	for ER
92015–19	1954	Crewe	BR1C	for LMR
92020-29	1955	Crewe	BR1B	Franco-Crosti boiler; for LMR
92030–44	1954	Crewe	BR1F	for ER
92045–59	1955	Crewe	BR1C	for LMR
92060–66	1955	Crewe	BR1B	for NER
92067–76	1956	Crewe	BR1F	for ER
92077–86	1956	Crewe	BR1C	for LMR
92087–96	1957	Swindon	BR1F	for ER
92097–99	1956	Crewe	BR1B	for NER
92100–18	1956	Crewe	BR1C	for LMR
92119–39	1957	Crewe	BR1C	for LMR
92140–49	1957	Crewe	BR1F	for ER
92150–64	1958	Crewe	BR1C	for LMR
92165–67	1958	Crewe	BR1K	for LMR; tenders later BR1C
92168–77	1958	Crewe	BR1F	for ER
92178–83	1957	Swindon	BR1F	for ER
92184–202	1958	Swindon	BR1F	for ER
92203–17	1959	Swindon	BR1G	for WR
92218–20	1960	Swindon	BR1G	for WR
92221–50	1958	Crewe	BR1G	for WR

== Variations ==
The 9F was used as a proving ground for a variety of technical innovations intended to provide improvements in efficiency, power or cost.

=== Franco-Crosti boiler ===
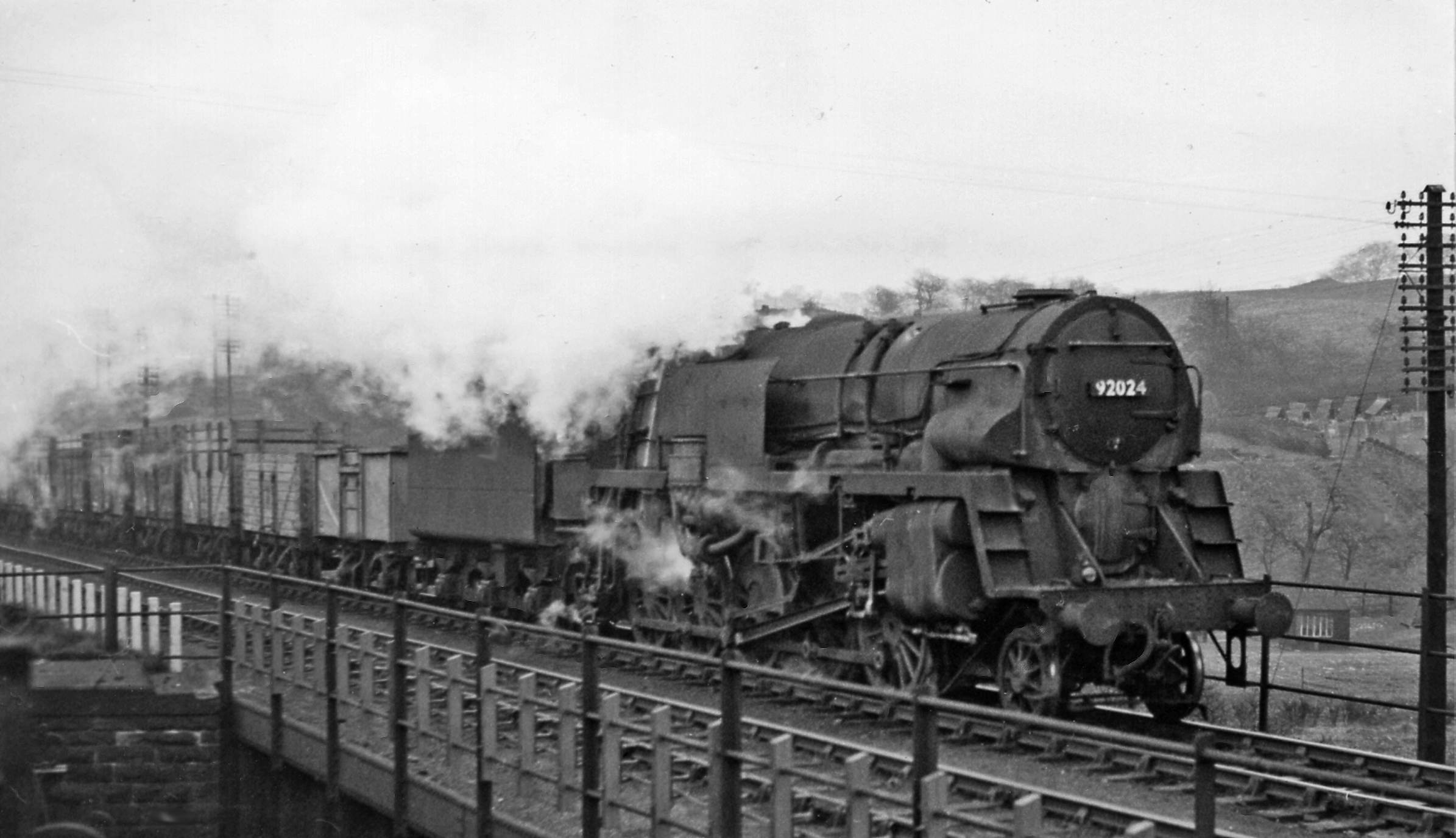
Right hand view of a Crosti BR Standard 9F 2-10-0, No. 92024, showing the unique layout

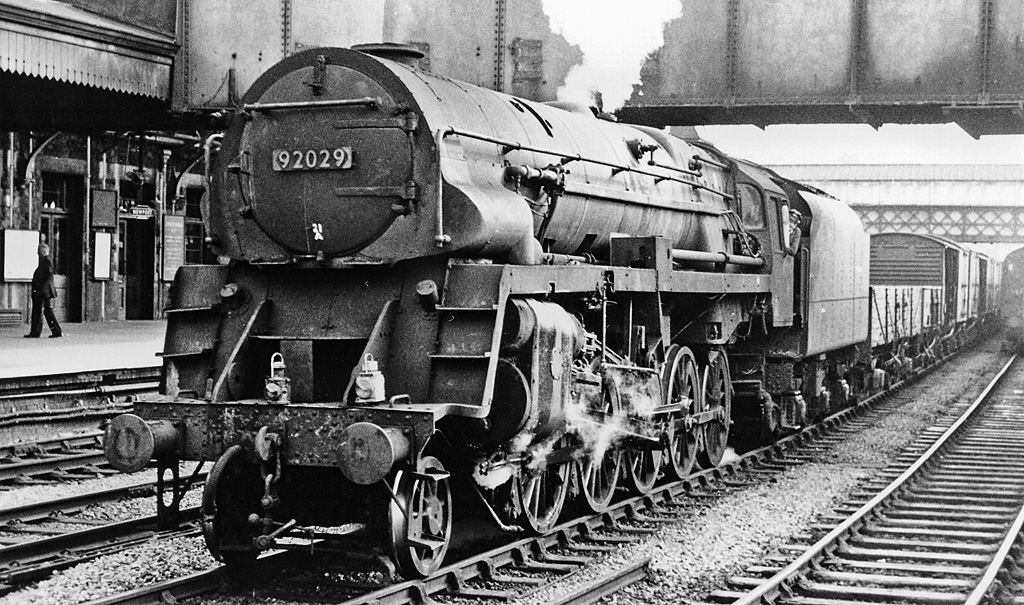
9F 92029 at Newport in 1963. By this stage it had been converted back to a conventional arrangement

Ten locomotives (numbers 92020-92029) were built in 1955 with the Franco-Crosti boiler which incorporated a combustion gas feed water preheater that recuperated low-grade residual heat. In the 9F version, this took the form of a single cylindrical water drum running along the underside of the main boiler barrel. The standard chimney on top of the smokebox was only used during lighting up. In normal working the gases went through firetubes inside the preheater drum that led to a second smokebox situated beneath the boiler from which there emerged a chimney on the right-hand side, just forward of the firebox. In the event, the experiment did not deliver the hoped-for benefits, and efficiency was not increased sufficiently to justify the cost and complexity. Moreover, conditions were unpleasant on the footplate in a cross-wind, this in spite of the later provision of a small deflector plate forward of the chimney. These problems led to the subsequent removal of the preheater drum, although the locomotives did retain the original main smokebox with its distinctive look.

=== Westinghouse Pump Variation ===
The ten 9F locomotives (92060-92066 and 92097–92099) allocated to Tyne Dock on the NER were fitted with Westinghouse Pumps to drive the pneumatic doors on the 56 ton ore hopper wagons which operated on the heavily inclined Consett line to the Consett Iron Company. These additional pumps allowed automatic discharging of the ore train, consisting of nine hoppers, in under a minute at Consett.

=== Mechanical stoker and blastpipe variation ===
Locomotive numbers 92165–92167 were built with a mechanical stoker, which was a helical screw that conveyed coal from the tender to the firebox, where it would be directed to the required part of the grate by high-pressure steam jets controlled by the fireman. The stoker made higher steaming rates possible, and it was hoped that mechanical stoking might enable the burning of low-grade coal. It was relatively inefficient, and the locomotives used in this trial were rebuilt to the normal configuration. Simply supplying more low grade coal than a fireman could do by hand did not provide efficient burning. Trials found that the maximum coal delivery rate of the mechanical stoker was slightly faster than firing by hand, and it could maintain that maximum for hours at a time when a fireman would tire. However, that was of little practical benefit in actual service, because even a long-distance freight train would frequently stop to allow faster trains to pass or would be held at signals. For the short periods when maximum firing rate was needed, a skilled fireman was more than sufficient. The success of mechanical stokers on North American railroads was mainly because the locomotives were significantly larger (with a commensurately greater demand for coal) and many routes required hours of supplying coal at a rate beyond the physical limit of a single fireman.

Number 92250 was equipped with a Giesl ejector, which divided the exhaust steam between seven nozzles arranged in a row on the locomotive's longitudinal axis, and directed into a narrow fan-shaped ejector that more intimately mixed it with the smokebox gases than is the case of an ordinary chimney. That offered the same level of draught for a reduced level of exhaust back-pressure or, alternatively, increased draught with no performance loss elsewhere. Again, claims were made about the potential benefits, and 92250 retained the variant chimney until withdrawal, although no benefit was noticeable.

The only modification which did deliver any noticeable benefit was the fitting of 92178 with a double blastpipe and chimney during its construction. Following delivery in September 1957, it was subjected to extensive testing, both in the Rugby Locomotive Testing Station and on service trains. After the completion of the tests in February 1958, it was decided to fit all 9Fs built subsequently with double blastpipes and chimneys — they were numbers 92183 onwards, as well as 92165–7. The modification was also installed on 92000/1/2/5 and 92006. That allowed the engines to steam slightly more freely and thus generate higher power ranges.

== Operational details ==
The 9F turned out to be the best of the Standard classes, and one of the finest steam locomotives ever designed in Britain in terms of its capacity to haul heavy loads over long distances. It was highly effective at its designed purpose, hauling heavy, fast freight trains, and was used all over the British railway network. This was exemplified when in September 1982, preserved engine 92203 Black Prince (Note: Post preservation name) set the record for the heaviest train ever hauled by a steam locomotive in Britain, when it started a 2,178-ton train at a Foster Yeoman quarry in Somerset, UK.

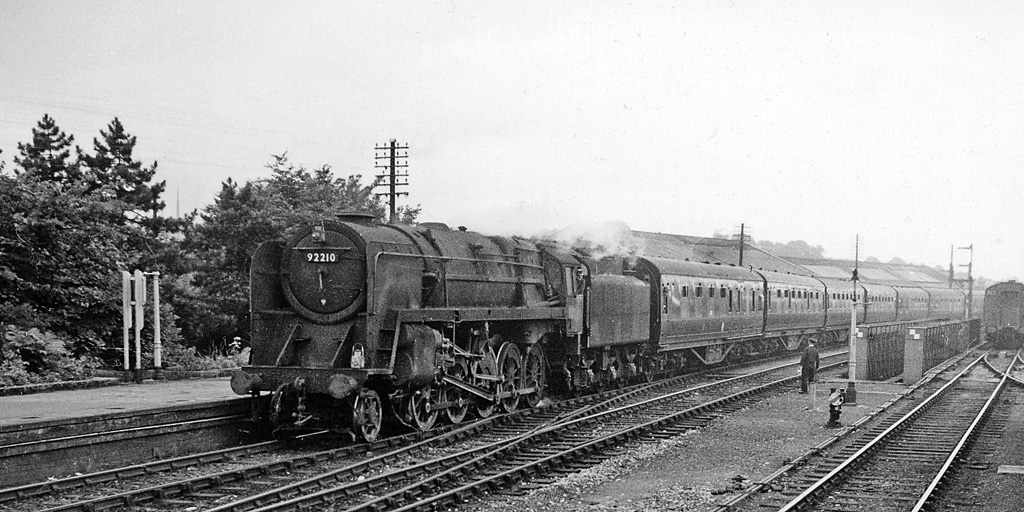
A 9F hauling an express passenger train at Bath Green Park station in 1962

The 9F also proved its worth as a passenger locomotive, adept at fast running despite its small driving wheels, and for a time was a frequent sight on the Somerset and Dorset Railway, where its power and high proportion of adhesive weight were well suited to coping with the 1 in 50 ruling gradient on the Bath extension. On one occasion, a 9F was set to haul an express passenger train, in place of the normal LNER pacific, from Grantham to King's Cross. An enthusiast aboard the train timed the run and noted that twice the speed exceeded 90 mph. The driver was afterwards told that he was only supposed to keep time, "not break the bloody sound barrier!". He replied that the engine had no speedometer, and that it ran so smoothly at high speeds that he just let it run as fast as felt safe. Nor was this the only instance of 9Fs reaching high speeds. However, concerns that the high rotational speeds involved in fast running could cause excessive wear and tear to the plain-bearing running gear prompted the British Railways management to stop using 9Fs on express passenger trains.

In 1960, 9Fs from the Western Region's Cardiff Canton shed (code 86C) were also regularly made ready as 'standby' locomotives - in case of failure of the more usual Britannias - on the region's flagship Paddington-Cardiff/Swansea passenger express trains, the Red Dragon and Capitals United Express. Locomotives used on these duties included No. 92220 Evening Star, the only 9F to be given a name and to be painted in the express passenger livery of lined Brunswick green. On 8 September 1962 No. 92220 also hauled the last Pines Express to use the Somerset and Dorset route.

Like other primarily goods locomotives, British Railways' fleet of 9Fs also saw extensive passenger service in hauling Saturday 'Holiday Specials', especially in the North East and Western regions.

Table of withdrawals
Year	Quantity in service at start of year	Quantity withdrawn	Locomotive numbers	Notes
1964	251	16	92034/36, 92169–71/75–77/96/98–99, 92207/10/29/32/45.	Numbers 92207 and 92245 are preserved.
1965	235	65	92000/03/05/07/33/37–42/44/57/66, 92140–44/47–49/68/74/78–81/84–95/97, 92200/02/09/14/16/19–22/25–26/30/35–38/40–44/46/48/50.	Evening Star was withdrawn this year. Numbers 92214, 92219, 92220, 92240 are preserved.
1966	170	46	92010/13/28/35/43/53/58–64/67–68/72/75/81/85/92/95/97–99, 92115–16/24/30/34/36/45–46/55/58/61/64/72–73/82–83, 92201/13/17/31/39/47.	Number 92134 is preserved.
1967	124	106	92001–02/06/08/11–12/14–27/29–32/45–52/55–56/65/70–71/73–74/76/78–80/82–84/86–87/89–90/93/96, 92100–14/17/19–23/25–29/31–33/35/37–39/50–52/54/56–57/59/62–63/66, 92203–06/08/11/15/24/27–28/34.	Number 92203 is preserved.
1968	18	18	92004/09/54/69/77/88/91/94, 92118/53/60/65/67, 92212/18/23/33/49.	Number 92212 is preserved.

== Accidents and incidents ==
- On 19 November 1958, locomotive No. 92187 was hauling a freight train which overran signals and was in a rear-end collision with another at Hitchin, Hertfordshire. A third freight train, hauled by Ex-LNER Class V2 2-6-2 No. 60885, ran into the wreckage.
- On 7 April 1964, locomotive No. 92161 was hauling a freight train that was derailed at Howe & Co's Signalbox, Cumberland due to a combination of defects on a wagon, excessive speed and minor track defects.

== Livery and numbering ==
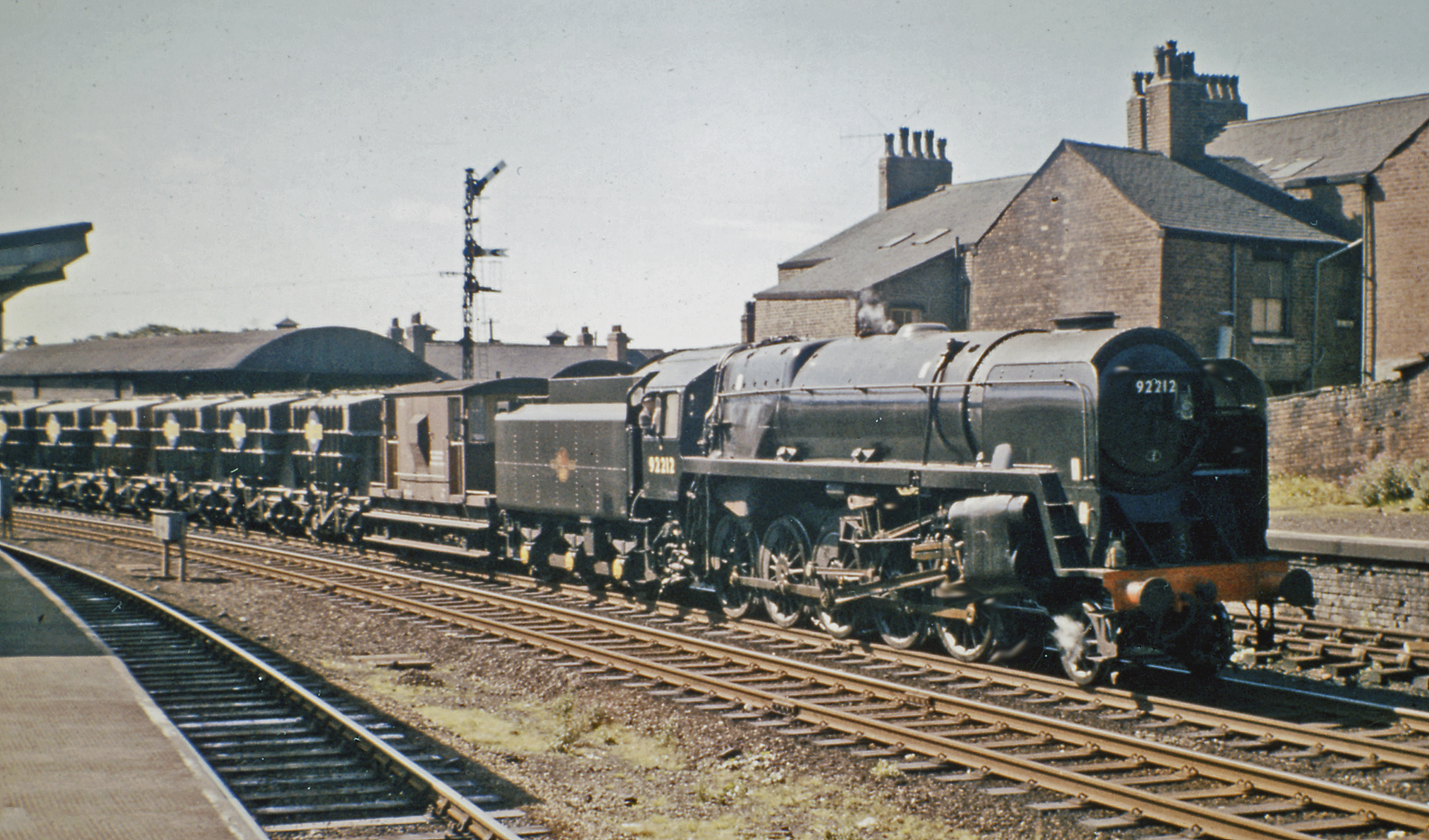
All but one 9F was painted unlined black. Pictured is 92212, now preserved, hauling a cement train at Preston station in August 1964

The class were painted British Railways Freight Black without lining. The British Railways crest was located on the tender side. Given the British Railways power classification 9F, the locomotives were numbered in the 92xxx series, between 92000 and 92250. Because of its status as the last steam locomotive constructed at Swindon, No. 92220 was named Evening Star and turned out in British Railways Brunswick Green livery, which was usually reserved for express passenger locomotives. Several locomotives allocated to the Western Region, including no. 92220, bore a blue spot on the cab side below the number, to denote the axle loading under the former GWR's system of weight classification.

== Preservation ==
Nine Standard Class 9F 2-10-0 tender locomotives survived withdrawal from mainline service into preservation: Evening Star became part of the National Collection; eight others were bought directly from BR or from Woodham Brothers scrapyard in Barry, South Wales. Only six members of the class have been restored to running order. 92240 was the first of the class to steam in preservation after restoration work in 1990. Engines from both builders have survived with three Crewe-built engines and six Swindon-built engines. The majority of the class have double chimneys but 92134 is the sole survivor fitted with a single chimney.

Number & Name	Tender Attached	Builder	Built	Withdrawn	Service life	Location	Livery	Status	Image
92134	BR1G (loaned from 73050)	Crewe Works	Jun 1957	Dec 1966	9 years, 6 months	North Yorkshire Moors Railway	BR Black, Late Emblem	Operational	
92203 'Black Prince'	BR1G	Swindon Works	Apr 1959	Nov 1967	8 years, 7 months	Bressingham Steam and Gardens	BR Black, Late Emblem	Stored	
92207 (Unofficial name 'Morning Star')	N/A	Swindon Works	Jun 1959	Dec 1964	5 years, 6 months	Private site - Poole	N/A	Undergoing Restoration	
92212	BR1F	Swindon Works	Sep 1959	Jan 1968	8 years, 4 months	Mid Hants Railway	BR Black, Late Emblem		
92214 Named 'Leicester City' at withdrawal in 2023	BR1G	Swindon Works	Oct 1959	Sep 1965	5 years, 11 months	Great Central Railway		Awaiting overhaul	
92219	N/A	Swindon Works	Jan 1960	Sep 1965	5 years, 8 months	Strathspey Railway	N/A	Stored, under long-term restoration	
92220 'Evening Star'	BR1G	Swindon Works	Mar 1960	Mar 1965	5 years	National Railway Museum	BR Lined Green, Late Emblem	Static Display	
92240	BR1C	Crewe Works	Oct 1958	Sep 1965	6 years, 11 months	Bluebell Railway	BR Black, Late Emblem		
92245	N/A	Crewe Works	Nov 1958	Dec 1964	6 years, 1 month	Barry Tourist Railway	N/A		

† In most cases, names are not historically accurate; i.e. they have all been applied in preservation except 92220 which, being the last steam locomotive to be built for BR, was named Evening Star during its unveiling in 1960. Some locomotives may also have names, but marked names indicate that the locomotive is not presently wearing them.

Of the nine surviving members of the class, two have run on the main line: nos. 92203 Black Prince & 92220 Evening Star. Due to the engines' flangeless centre driving wheels, there is a concern that the raised check rails on modern pointwork might cause a derailment, so the class (alongside other 2-10-0 locomotives) is currently prohibited from operating on the main line – including the Esk Valley Line from Battersby to Whitby, used by the North Yorkshire Moors Railway on their Grosmont to Whitby trains alongside the regular passenger services on the route.

== Models ==
=== OO scale ===
The erstwhile Kitmaster company produced an unpowered polystyrene injection moulded model kit for scale. In late 1962, the Kitmaster brand was sold by its parent company (Rosebud Dolls) to Airfix, which transferred the moulding tools to their own factory; the 9F class was among the re-introduced former Kitmaster range. In time, the moulding tools passed on to Dapol, which also produced the kit. During the 1960s a cast white metal chassis kit in the Simplas range to motorise the model was made available by Wilro Models of Hackney, London.

In late 1971, Tri-ang Hornby introduced a 00 scale Ready to Run model of this locomotive; it continued to be produced after the rebranding as Hornby Railways.

=== N scale ===
In the 1980s Minitrix produced two ready-to-run British N gauge models of the class, including a model of 92220 Evening Star.

In 2008, Dapol introduced a British N gauge model of locomotive 92100. The following year, Dapol were commissioned to produce a British N gauge ready-to-run model of 92203 by TMC.

== In fiction ==
The character Murdoch from Thomas & Friends, introduced in the show's seventh season, is based on a BR Standard Class 9F locomotive.

== References and notes ==
=== Further reading ===
- Cox, E. S. (1966). British Railways Standard Locomotives. London: Ian Allan.
- Richard Derry (2006). The Book of the 9F 2-10-0s. Irwell Press. ISBN 1-903266-73-4.
- Gavin Morrison (2001). The Power of the 9Fs. OPC Railprint. ISBN 0-86093-558-2.
- H.C.B. Rogers (1982). Riddles and the 9Fs. Ian Allan.
- G. Weekes (1975). BR Standard Class 9F. D. Bradford Barton. ISBN 0-85153-187-3.
- Nock, O.S. (9 October 1959). "2-10-0 Standard Freight Locomotive Performance and Efficiency Tests" (PDF). The Engineer. 208: 383–386.
- Leigh, Chris (Winter 1998). "The BR Standard 'Spaceship'". Model Rail. No. 5. Peterborough: EMAP Apex. pp. 18–27. ISSN 1369-5118. OCLC 173324502.
