= Robert Riddles =

British locomotive engineer

Robin Riddles
- Born: 23 May 1892
- Died: 18 June 1983 (aged 91)
- Engineering career
- Discipline: Locomotive Engineering
- Institutions: Institution of Mechanical Engineers (member), Institution of Locomotive Engineers

Robert Arthur "Robin" Riddles, CBE, MIMechE, MinstLE (23 May 1892 – 18 June 1983) was a British locomotive design engineer.

== Biography ==
=== LNWR and LMS ===
Riddles was born in 1892 in East Preston in Worthing, Sussex. His father was a contractors' manager. He attended St Andrew's High School, Worthing. Riddles entered the Crewe Works of the London and North Western Railway as a premium apprentice in 1909, completing his apprenticeship in 1913. While attending the Mechanics Institute classes he took a course in electrical engineering, feeling there would be a future for electric traction. During the 1914–18 Great War he served with the Royal Engineers mainly in France, during which time he was badly wounded.

He returned to the LNWR at Crewe and, in 1920, became the "bricks and mortar assistant", with responsibility for the new erecting shop. When work on that was stopped, Riddles was placed in charge of a small production progress department and was sent to Horwich to study the methods used by the L&Y. From that, Riddles gained some backing and had significant influence in the re-organisation of Crewe, which took place between 1925 and 1927. In 1923, the LNWR became part of the London, Midland and Scottish Railway so, on completion of the work at Crewe, Riddles was sent to the ex-Midland Railway works at Derby, by then part of the LMS, to initiate a similar arrangement. In that task, he had the active support of the then Derby works manager, H. G. Ivatt.

During the nine-day General Strike in May 1926, Riddles volunteered as a driver, taking trains from Crewe to Manchester and Carlisle. The experience gained made him almost unique among CMEs, and he maintained that the practical knowledge he gained from driving a locomotive was an invaluable aid to his design work.

In 1933, Riddles moved to Euston to become Locomotive Assistant to the new Chief Mechanical Engineer, Sir William Stanier and, in 1935, became Stanier's Principal Assistant. In 1937, Riddles moved to Glasgow as Mechanical & Electrical Engineer - Scotland, the first to combine both engineering disciplines in a single title. However, Riddles was disappointed that C. E. Fairburn was appointed as Stanier's Deputy.

=== Ministry of Supply ===
In 1939, with the Second World War having just started, he moved to the Ministry of Supply, becoming Director of Transportation Equipment, and later designed the WD Austerity 2-8-0 and WD Austerity 2-10-0 locomotives.

=== Return to LMS ===
In 1943, he moved to the post of Chief Stores Superintendent at the LMS - it has been said that he was anxious to get back into the railway business. On the death of Charles Fairburn in 1944, he applied for the position of Chief Mechanical Engineer, but the job went to George Ivatt, with Riddles being promoted to vice-president of the LMS.

=== British Railways ===
Upon the creation of the Railway Executive in 1947, in preparation for the nationalisation of the railways in 1948, he was appointed Member of the Railway Executive for Mechanical and Electrical Engineering. He had two principal assistants, both of whom were also former LMS men: Roland C. Bond, Chief Officer (Locomotive Construction and Maintenance), and E. S. Cox, Executive Officer (Design). The duties of the three effectively covered the old post of Chief Mechanical Engineer and they subsequently oversaw the design of the British Railways (BR) standard classes.

=== Locomotive Designs ===
Locomotive designs introduced by Riddles include:

- BR Standard Class 9F, 2-10-0
- BR Standard Class 8, 4-6-2
- BR Standard Class 7 Britannia Class, 4-6-2
- BR Standard Class 6 Clan Class, 4-6-2
- BR Standard Class 5, 4-6-0
- BR Standard Class 4, 4-6-0
- BR Standard Class 4 2-6-0
- BR Standard Class 4 2-6-4T
- BR Standard Class 3 2-6-0
- BR Standard Class 3 2-6-2T
- BR Standard Class 2 2-6-0
- BR Standard Class 2 2-6-2T
- WD Austerity 2-8-0
- WD Austerity 2-10-0

=== Retirement ===
Riddles retired in 1953, on the abolition of the Railway Executive, and became a director of Stothert & Pitt of Bath, Cranemakers.

Riddles was succeeded as Chief Mechanical Engineer of BR by Roland Bond.
