= Western Region of British Railways =

Former British Railways operating region

- Region logo from 1965 to 1992
- Franchise: Not subject to franchising (1 January 1948 – 31 December 1992)
- Main Regions: London, West of England, West Midlands, Wales
- Parent company: British Rail

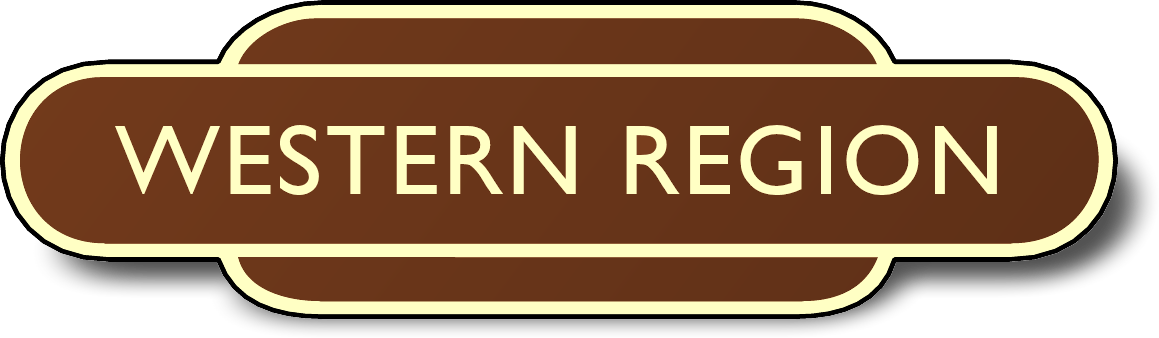
Station totem design prior to 1965

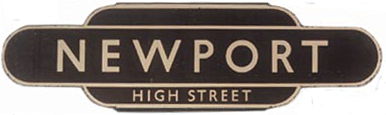
British Railways Western Region "totem" station sign for Newport High Street

The Western Region was a region of British Railways from 1948. The region ceased to be an operating unit in its own right on completion of the "Organising for Quality" initiative on 6 April 1992. The Region consisted principally of ex-Great Western Railway lines, minus certain lines west of Birmingham, which were transferred to the London Midland Region in 1963 and with the addition of all former Southern Railway routes west of Exeter, which were subsequently rationalised.

== History ==
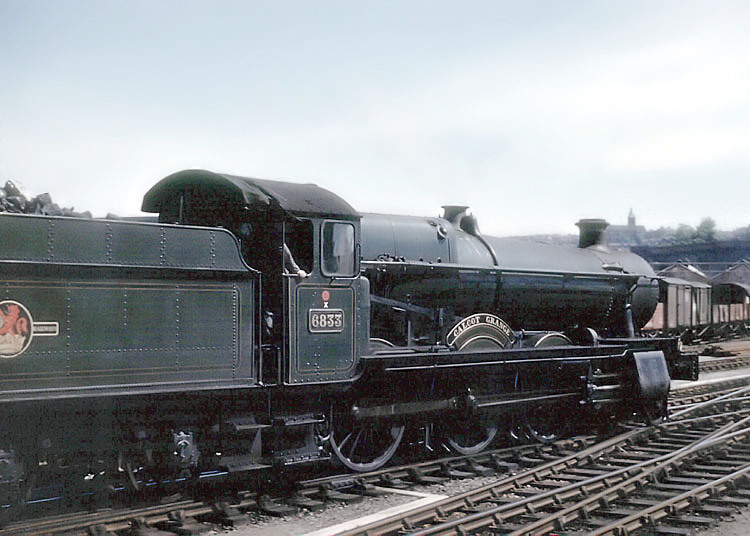
Ex-Great Western Railway No. 6833 Calcot Grange, a 4-6-0 Grange class steam locomotive, at Bristol Temple Meads

When British Railways was created at the start of 1948, it was immediately subdivided into six Regions, largely based upon pre-nationalisation ownership. The Western Region initially consisted of the former Great Western Railway system, totalling 3,782 route miles and with its headquarters at Paddington. To this was added some minor railways and joint lines in which the GWR had an interest:

- Brynmawr and Western Valleys Railway
- Clifton Extension Railway
- Easton and Church Hope Railway
- Great Western and Great Central Joint Railway – including the Banbury Junction Railway between Banbury and Culworth Junction
- Halesowen Railway
- Rhymney Joint Railway
- Severn and Wye and Severn Bridge Railway
- Shrewsbury and Hereford Railway
- Shrewsbury and Wellington Joint Railway
- Shrewsbury and Welshpool Railway
- Shropshire and Montgomeryshire Railway
- Tenbury Railway
- Vale of Towy Railway
- West Cornwall Railway
- West London Railway
- West London Extension Railway
- Weymouth and Portland Railway
- Wrexham and Minera Railway

Regional boundaries were adjusted several times in subsequent years. The first such adjustments took place on 2 April 1950, under which the WR gained

- Banbury Merton Street station from the London Midland Region
- Bicester to Oxford from the London Midland Region
- Broom to Byfield (excluding Byfield station) from the London Midland Region
- Cole to Bath, Bridgwater, Burnham and Wells from the Southern Region
- Exeter to Bude, Ilfracombe, Padstow, Plymouth and branches from the Southern Region
- Hadley Junction to Coalport from the London Midland Region
- Leamington Spa Avenue station from the London Midland Region
- Marylebone to Northolt Junction from the Eastern Region
- Neasden to Harrow (excluding Harrow station) from the Eastern Region
- Selly Oak to Bath and Bristol, and all branches from that route from the London Midland Region
- Warwick Milverton station from the London Midland Region

At the same time, the WR lost several lines:

- Crudgington to Nantwich to the London Midland Region
- Grafton & Burbage to Andover Junction to the Southern Region
- Newbury to Winchester to the Southern Region
- Reading West to Basingstoke to the Southern Region
- Sparkford to Weymouth, including branches to the Southern Region
- Thorney & Kingsbury Halt to Yeovil to the Southern Region
- Thornfalcon to Chard Central to the Southern Region
- Westbury to Salisbury to the Southern Region

The Great Western Railway (GWR) was established during the 19th century. Although run down by the Second World War, its management opposed its nationalisation into British Railways. Even after nationalisation under the Transport Act 1947 and amalgamation with the other railway companies as British Railways, the new Region continued its enmity with its powerful neighbour, the London Midland Region, which had been born out of the London, Midland and Scottish Railway. There were few incomers to the Region at senior level: for example, the Chairman of the Regional Board from 1955, Reggie Hanks, came from the motor industry but had been a Swindon Works apprentice. In the 1956–1962 period, a range of express trains were named and their coaches given GWR-style chocolate and cream colours.

Major changes came on the appointment from outside as Regional Managers Stanley Raymond (in 1962) and Gerry Fiennes (in 1963); both worked hard to eliminate the Western Region's large financial operating deficit.

Some revenues were increased, but most of the savings came from cuts. Adjusted for transfer of Banbury northward to LMR and Dorset, Devon and Cornwall from SR, the assets of WR reduced greatly over the decade 1955–1965 and especially from 1963 to 1965:

Asset	1955	1961	1963	1965
Miles of routes	3,700	3,500	3,115	3,000
Stations	1,296	1,045	786	422
Goods depots	1,100	989	775	231
Locomotives	–	3,247	2,040	721
Coaches	–	–	3,327	2,604
Staff	92,380	75,000	62,435	48,252

== Infrastructure ==
Major new investment in infrastructure did not go ahead substantially until after 1955. The earliest projects included the rebuilding of stations at Banbury and Plymouth, both postponed since the 1940s; of less long-term relevance were new facilities at Paignton for summer holiday passenger traffic and a marshalling yard at Margam in South Wales. Bristol Parkway station opened in 1972.

== Rolling stock ==
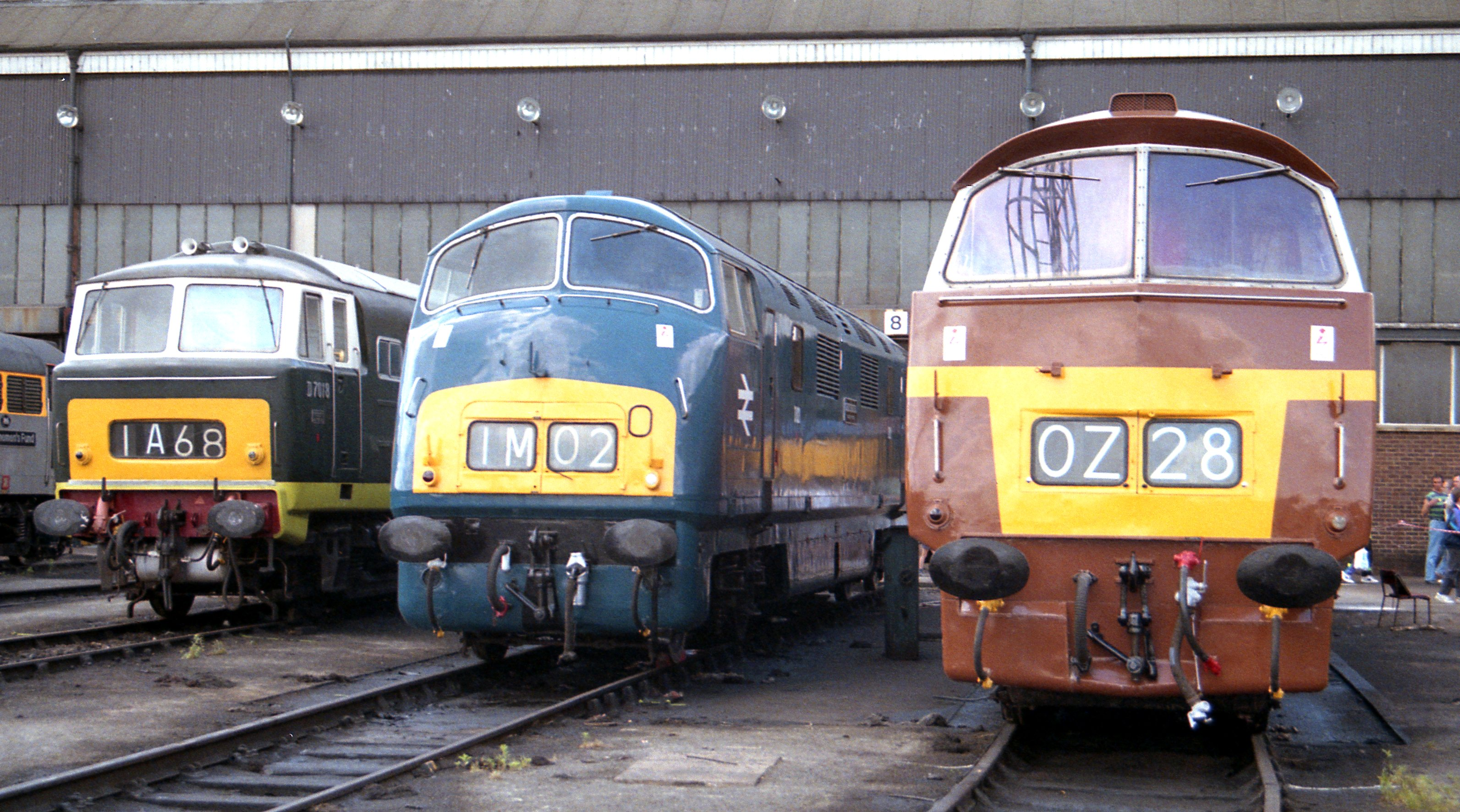
A line up of the Western Region's unique diesel-hydraulic locomotives

The Western Region built a large number of steam locomotives to GWR designs including 341 pannier tanks, even after the advent of diesel shunters. Both 2-6-0 tender and 2-6-2 tank engine variants of the BR Standard Class 3 were also built by the Western Region. It was the first region of BR to eliminate steam traction under the 1955 Modernisation Plan.

While the other BR regions introduced diesel-electric locomotives the Western Region went its own way by purchasing a complete range of diesel-hydraulic locomotives covering the type 1 to type 4 power requirements. These included the Warship locomotives, which were based on proven West German designs, the British-designed Class 14, Hymek and Western types; these were all eventually withdrawn and replaced with more standard British Rail diesel-electric classes such as the Class 37 and Class 47 upon the British Railways Board declaring diesel-hydraulic locomotives "non-standard" in an attempt to reduce costs.

One of the major improvements on the Western Region, and later on the Eastern Region East Coast Main Line, was the introduction on the Great Western Main Line of the InterCity 125 trains in 1976/7 bringing major accelerations to the timetables.
