= Ernest Stewart Cox =

British steam locomotive engineer and author

Ernest Stewart Cox (17 June 1900 – 14 September 1992) was a British steam locomotive engineer and author. He had a career with the Lancashire and Yorkshire Railway, London, Midland and Scottish Railway and British Rail, where he finished as Assistant Chief mechanical engineer.

When British Railways was created at the start of 1948, Cox was appointed to the Railway Executive (RE) in the post of "Executive Officer (Design)", one of several members of staff who reported to R. A. Riddles. As a member of the RE staff, he had an office in the RE headquarters at 222 Marylebone Road, London.

== Bibliography ==
- British Railways standard steam locomotives
- Chronicles of steam
- Locomotive panorama
- Speaking of steam
- World steam in the twentieth century
