= BR Standard Class 4 2-6-0 =

Class of two-cylinder 2-6-0 locomotives

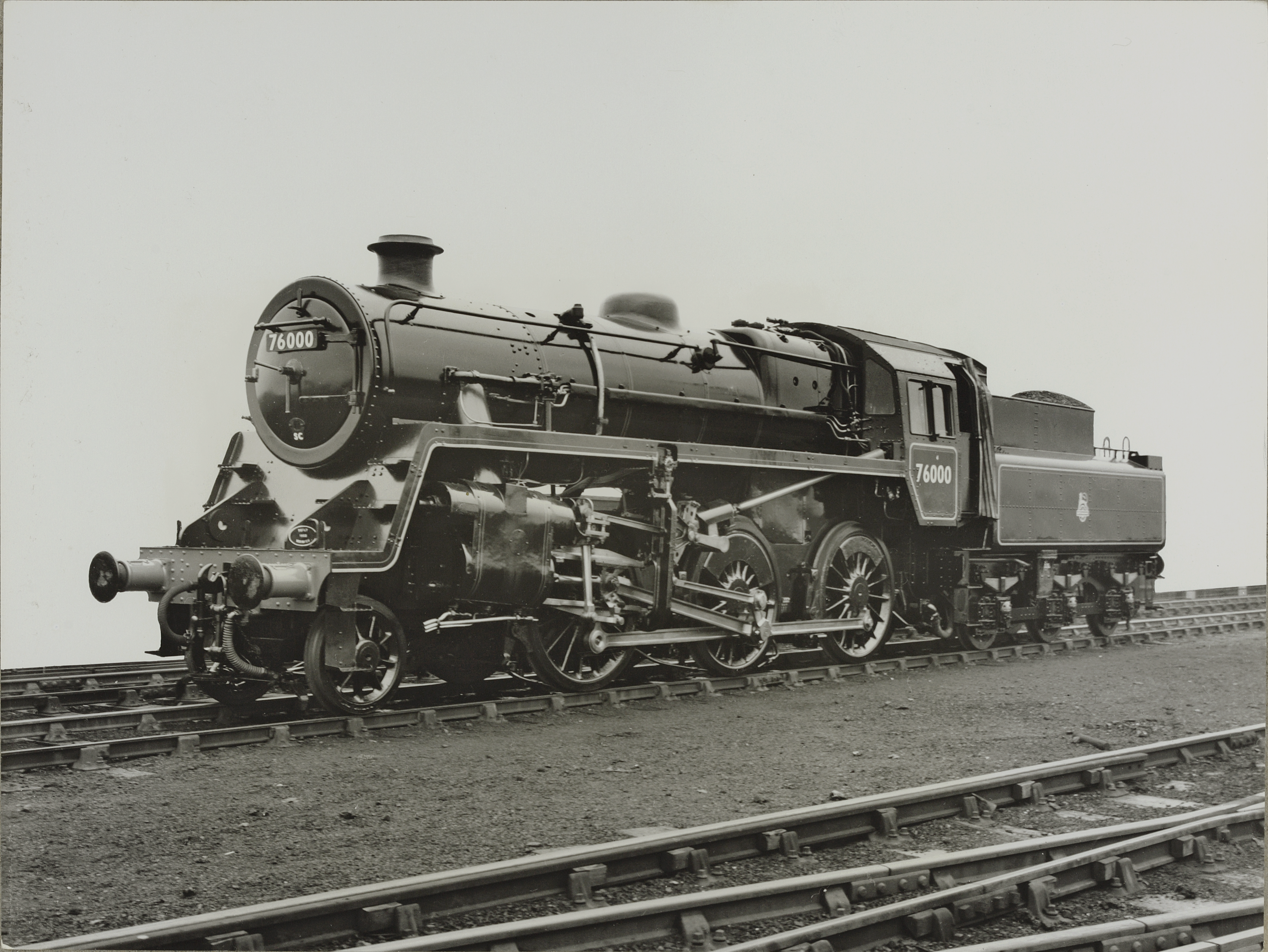
- British Railways No. 76000 in 1952.
Type and origin
- Power type: Steam
- Designer: R. A. Riddles
- Builder: BR Horwich (45); Doncaster (70)
- Build date: December 1952 – November 1957
- Total produced: 115
Specifications
- Configuration
  - Whyte: 2-6-0
  - UIC: 1′C h2
- Gauge: 4 ft 8 1/2 in (1,435 mm)
- Leading dia.: 3 ft 0 in (0.914 m)
- Driver dia.: 5 ft 3 in (1.600 m)
- Length: 60 ft 0 in (18.29 m)
- Width: 8 ft 9 1/2 in (2.68 m)
- Height: 13 ft 0 in (3.96 m)
- Axle load: Loco: 16.95 long tons (17.22 t; 18.98 short tons); BR1B tender: 17.1 long tons (17.4 t; 19.2 short tons)
- Adhesive weight: 50.45 long tons (51.26 t; 56.50 short tons)
- Loco weight: 59.75 long tons (60.71 t; 66.92 short tons)
- Tender weight: BR1B: 49.15 long tons (49.94 t; 55.05 short tons); BR2/BR2A: 42.15 long tons (42.83 t; 47.21 short tons)
- Tender type: BR1B (17), BR2 (45), BR2A (53)
- Fuel type: Coal
- Fuel capacity: BR1B: 7 long tons (7.1 t; 7.8 short tons); BR2/BR2A: 6.00 long tons (6.10 t; 6.72 short tons)
- Water cap.: BR1B: 4,250 imp gal (19,300 L; 5,100 US gal); BR2/BR2A: 3,500 imp gal (16,000 L; 4,200 US gal)
- Firebox
  - Grate area: 23 sq ft (2.1 m^{2})
- Boiler: BR7
- Boiler pressure: 225 psi (1.55 MPa)
- Heating surface
  - Firebox: 131 sq ft (12.2 m^{2})
  - Tubes and flues: 1,075 sq ft (99.9 m^{2})
- Superheater
  - Heating area: 247 sq ft (22.9 m^{2})
- Cylinders: Two, outside
- Cylinder size: 17.5 in × 26 in (444 mm × 660 mm)
Performance figures
- Tractive effort: 24,170 lbf (107.5 kN)
- Factor of adh.: 4.68
Career
- Operators: British Railways
- Power class: 4MT
- Numbers: 76000–76114
- Axle load class: Route Availability 4
- Withdrawn: May 1964 – December 1967
- Disposition: Four preserved, remainder scrapped

The BR Standard Class 4 2-6-0 is a class of steam locomotive designed by Robert Riddles for British Railways (BR). 115 locomotives were built to this standard.

== Design and construction ==
The class was designed at the ex-LNER works at Doncaster which was also responsible for building 70 of the 115-strong class. The remaining 45 were built at Horwich. None were built at Derby Works although it was intended that 20 would be built there, Doncaster in fact took them on.

The last in the series, No.76114, was also the final steam engine to be constructed at the 'Plant' (as Doncaster works was known). 76099 was last steam locomotive to be built at Horwich and in fact, was the last of the class to be completed, just after 76114 at Doncaster. The Standard Four Mogul was essentially a standardised version of the LMS Ivatt Class 4, and was primarily intended for freight use.

Although a BR Standard, the 4 2-6-0 class did not have the same design of wheels as the Swindon-built 82XXX and 77XXX Class 3 engines which also had 5-foot-3-inch (1.600 m) driving wheels, yet all three locomotive classes share the same cylinder casting.

The cylinder covers of engines built early in the programme of construction were fitted with "screw-in" type pressure relief valves. From September 1955 revised cylinder covers were introduced for renewals incorporating "bolt-on" type pressure relief valves. (Note: Rear cylinder cover SL/SW/35 being superseded by SL/SW/666 and front cylinder cover SL/SW/85 being superseded by SL/SW/667 for renewals from September 1955) Rectangular type coupling rods rather than the original fluted type, were fitted to 76035 onwards.

== Operation ==
With its 5-foot-3-inch (1.60 m) diameter driving wheels this sixth of the BR standard designs was clearly biased towards freight working. An axle-loading of only 16 long tons 15 cwt (37,500 lb or 17 t) meant its route availability was virtually unrestricted. Batches were allocated to every BR region except the Western.

== Accidents and incidents ==
- On 23 September 1954, locomotive No. 76017 was hauling a freight train that overran signals and was derailed by trap points at Whitchurch Town station, Hampshire.
- In December 1957, locomotive No. 76016 was hauling a freight train that overran signals and was derailed by trap points at Woodhay station, Hampshire.
- On 12 February 1960, locomotive No. 76026 was hauling a freight train that overran signals and was derailed by trap points at Whitchurch Town station.

== Preservation ==
Four engines have survived into preservation, all four built at Horwich Works and rescued from Woodham Brothers scrapyard at Barry Island. Three members of the class have steamed so far in preservation but 76077 has yet to do so and is at present undergoing restoration from scrapyard condition. As of September 2023, no members of the class are mainline certified. All three engines that have run in preservation have been on the main line, but only two have hauled railtours, 76079 and 76084. On 13 October 2022, 76017 was moved by rail from its home at the Watercress Line to the Bluebell Railway.

76079's main career on the main line was when it was owned by Ian Riley in Bury, Lancashire, but it was eventually sold to the NYMR. After completion of an overhaul in 2014 it once again had a mainline certificate but was restricted between Battersby and Whitby on the Esk Valley Line, the locomotive is now no longer mainline certified or based at the North Yorkshire Moors Railway. 76084 meanwhile, was certified to operate over the national network hauling railtours alongside passenger runs along the Bittern Line and the Esk Valley Line.

BR No.	TOPS No. (if applicable)	Built	Withdrawn	Service life	Home base	Owner	Livery	Tender Attached	Status	Mainline Certified	Image	Notes
76017	98417	May 1953	Jul 1965	12 Years, 1 month	Kent & East Sussex Railway	John Bunch	BR Lined Black, Early Emblem	BR2A	Stored. Boiler Ticket Expired: 2026.	No, to be certified		Recently changed ownership following death of previous owner.
76077	-	Dec 1956	Dec 1967	11 Years	Gloucestershire Warwickshire Railway	Toddington Standard Locomotive Limited	N/A	BR2A	Under Restoration from scrapyard condition	No		Fundraising for the boiler overhaul is underway and the tender pattern is confirmed as being a BR2A pattern. Restoration anticipated for completion in 2026.
76079	98476	Feb 1957	Dec 1967	10 Years, 10 months	Strathspey Railway	Strathspey Railway	BR Lined Black, Early Emblem	BR2A	Under Overhaul	No		Sold from North Yorkshire Moors Railway to Strathspey Railway in May 2026.
76084	98484	Apr 1957	Dec 1967	10 Years, 8 months	North Norfolk Railway	76084 Locomotive Company Limited	BR Lined Black, Early Emblem	BR2A	Under Overhaul	No (2016 - 2023)		Withdrawn for 10 year overhaul in Dec 2023. Overhaul commenced in June 2026.

== Models ==
The erstwhile Kitmaster company produced an unpowered polystyrene injection moulded model kit for 00 gauge. In late 1962, the Kitmaster brand was sold by its parent company (Rosebud Dolls) to Airfix, who transferred the moulding tools to their own factory; they re-introduced some of the former Kitmaster range, including this locomotive. In time, the moulding tools passed on to Dapol who have also produced the model kit.

Bachmann produces a ready-to-run model in both OO and as part of their Graham Farish range for British N gauge.

== Sound ==
- 76079 Between Egton and Grosmont
- 76079 departing from Grosmont
