= BR Standard Class 4 4-6-0 =

British steam locomotive class

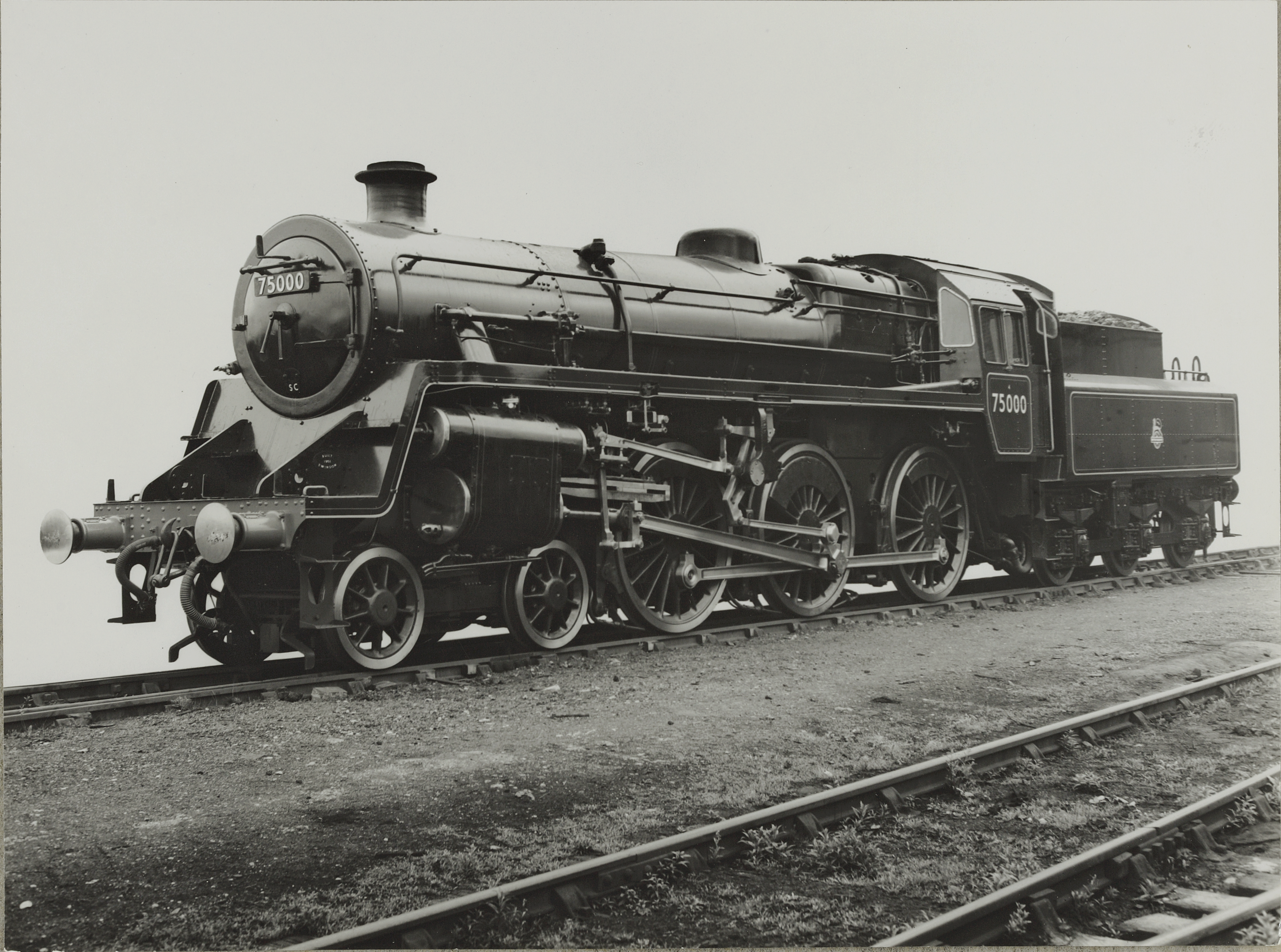
- BR Standard 4MT 4-6-0 No. 75000 (08-09-1951).
Type and origin
- Power type: Steam
- Designer: R. A. Riddles
- Builder: BR Swindon Works
- Build date: May 1951 – May 1957
- Total produced: 80
Specifications
- Configuration
  - Whyte: 4-6-0
  - UIC: 2′C h2
- Gauge: 4 ft 8 1/2 in (1,435 mm)
- Leading dia.: 3 ft 0 in (0.914 m)
- Driver dia.: 5 ft 8 in (1.727 m)
- Length: 60 ft 0 in (18.29 m)
- Width: 8 ft 9 1/2 in (2.68 m)
- Height: 13 ft 0 in (3.96 m)
- Axle load: 17.25 long tons (17.53 t; 19.32 short tons)
- Adhesive weight: 51.55 long tons (52.38 t; 57.74 short tons)
- Loco weight: 67.90 long tons (68.99 t; 76.05 short tons)
- Tender weight: BR1B: 49.15 long tons (49.94 t); BR2/BR2A: 42.15 long tons (42.83 t)
- Tender type: BR1B (15), BR2 (50), BR2A (15)
- Fuel type: Coal
- Fuel capacity: BR1B: 7.00 long tons (7.11 t; 7.84 short tons); BR2/BR2A: 6.00 long tons (6.10 t; 6.72 short tons)
- Water cap.: BR1B: 4,725 imp gal (21,480 L; 5,674 US gal); BR2/BR2A: 3,500 imp gal (16,000 L; 4,200 US gal)
- Firebox
  - Grate area: 26.7 sq ft (2.48 m^{2})
- Boiler: BR4
- Boiler pressure: 225 psi (1.55 MPa)
- Heating surface
  - Firebox: 143 sq ft (13.3 m^{2})
  - Tubes and flues: 1,301 sq ft (120.9 m^{2})
- Superheater
  - Heating area: 258 sq ft (24.0 m^{2})
- Cylinders: Two, outside
- Cylinder size: 18 in × 28 in (457 mm × 711 mm)
Performance figures
- Tractive effort: 25,515 lbf (113.5 kN)
- Factor of adh.: 4.52
Career
- Operators: British Railways
- Power class: 4MT
- Numbers: 75000–75079
- Axle load class: BR1B: Route Availability 7 BR2/BR2A: Route Availability 4
- Withdrawn: October 1964 – August 1968
- Disposition: 6 preserved, remainder scrapped

The British Railways Standard Class 4 4-6-0 is a class of steam locomotives, 80 of which were built during the 1950s. Six have been preserved.

== Background ==
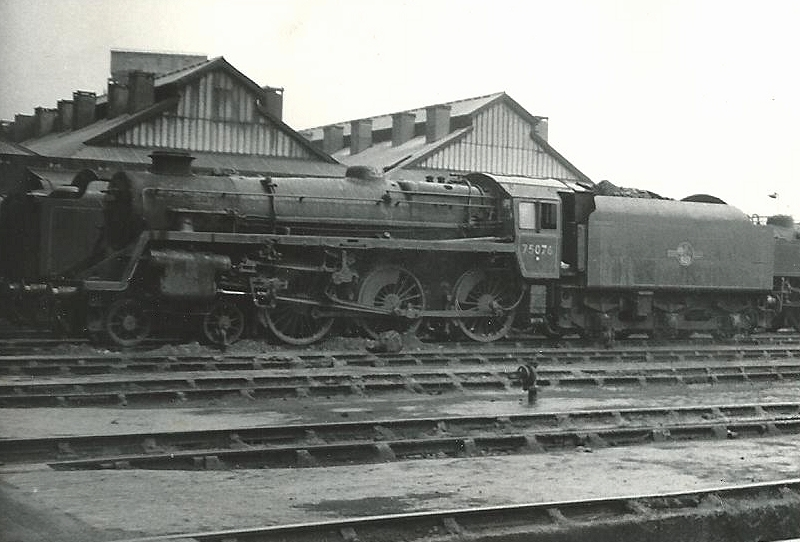
75076 with a double chimney and BR1B type tender.

The class was introduced in 1951. They were designed for mixed traffic use on secondary routes where the otherwise ubiquitous BR Standard Class 5 and their predecessors, the Black Fives, would be too heavy. They were essentially a tender version of the Class 4 2-6-4T, with similar characteristics to the GWR 7800 Class, though unlike the 7800s they were built to the universal loading gauge. They used the same running gear as the tank engine (with the leading bogie from the Standard Class 5), and substantially the same firebox, smokebox and boiler, although the boiler barrel was increased in length by 9 inches (229 mm).

Design work was done at Brighton by R. A. Riddles, with help from Swindon, Derby and Doncaster. Construction was at the BR Swindon Works.

The engine weighed 67.90 long tons (68.99 t; 76.05 short tons), was 60 ft 0 in (18.29 m) long, with 5 ft 8 in (1.727 m) diameter driving wheels. It had two cylinders of 18 inches (457 mm) diameter and 28 inches (711 mm) stroke operated at maximum boiler pressure of 225 lbf/in^{2} (1.55 MPa), to produce 25,515 lbf (113.5 kN) tractive effort. Its British Railways power classification was 4MT.

It normally used the standard BR2 or BR2A tender, which weighed 42.15 long tons (42.83 t; 47.21 short tons) and carried 3,500 imp gal (16,000 L; 4,200 US gal) of water and 6.00 long tons (6.10 t; 6.72 short tons) of coal. In this configuration its route availability was 4, almost universal over the British Railways network.

== In service ==
The class was initially allocated to the London Midland Region (45) and the Western Region (20). The last 15 were allocated to the Southern Region. The Southern batch were built with BR1B tenders, which weighed 49.15 long tons (49.94 t; 55.05 short tons), and carried 4,725 imp gal (21,480 L; 5,674 US gal) of water and 7.00 long tons (7.11 t; 7.84 short tons) of coal. This reduced their route availability to 7, the same as the Standard Class 5.

Table of withdrawals
| Year | Quantity in service at start of year | Quantity withdrawn | Locomotive numbers |
|---|---|---|---|
| 1964 | 80 | 2 | 75001/67 |
| 1965 | 78 | 11 | 75000/03/05/07–08/22/25/28/38/72–73 |
| 1966 | 67 | 20 | 75011/14/23/31/36/44–45/49–51/53–54/56–57/63/65–66/69–70/79 |
| 1967 | 47 | 37 | 75002/04/06/10/12–13/15–18/24/26/29–30/33/35/37/39–40/42–43/46–47/52/55/58–61/64/68/71/74–78 |
| 1968 | 10 | 10 | 75009/19–21/27/32/34/41/48/62 |

== Preservation ==
Six members of the class survive with both single chimney and double chimney examples. Two were purchased directly from BR (75027 & 75029); the remaining four were rescued from Woodham Brothers' scrapyard at Barry Island.

No member of the class is presently main line approved but three (75014, 75029 and 75069) have worked on the main line at various points in preservation. 75029 was passed to work on the main line between Grosmont and Whitby with occasional visits to Battersby during galas. All except for 75079 have operated in preservation.

Preserved locomotives
| Number & Name | Tender Attached | Chimney Fitted | Built | Withdrawn | Service life | Home Base | Owner | Livery | Status | Image | Notes |
|---|---|---|---|---|---|---|---|---|---|---|---|
| 75014 "Braveheart" | BR2A | Single | Nov 1951 | Dec 1966 | 15 years, 30 days | Dartmouth Steam Railway | Dartmouth Steam Railway | BR Lined Black, Early Emblem | Operational. Boiler ticket expires: 2026 | | |
| 75027 | BR2A | Single | May 1954 | Aug 1968 | 14 years, 3 months | Bluebell Railway | Bluebell Railway | BR Lined Green, Late Crest | Static Display | | |
| 75029 "The Green Knight" | BR2A | Double | May 1954 | Aug 1967 | 13 years, 3 months | North Yorkshire Moors Railway | North Yorkshire Moors Railway | BR Lined Green, Late Crest | Under Overhaul. | | Withdrawn in 2015 with cracks in firebox, overhaul commenced in 2018 |
| 75069 | BR1B | Double | Sept 1955 | Sept 1966 | 11 years | Severn Valley Railway | 75069 Fund | BR Lined Black, Late Crest | Operational. Boiler ticket expires: 2028 | | |
| 75078 | BR1B | Double | Jan 1956 | Jul 1966 | 10 years, 5 months | Keighley and Worth Valley Railway | The Standard 4 Locomotive Preservation Society | BR Lined Black, Late Crest | Operational. Boiler ticket expires: 2032 | | |
| 75079 | BR1B | Double | Jan 1956 | Nov 1966 | 10 years, 10 months | Watercress Line | Mid-Hants Railway Preservation Society | N/A | Under restoration | | |

== Model railways ==
Bachmann and Hornby have both released models of these engines in 00 gauge. Mainline Railways also released a OO gauge model of the Standard Class 4MT 4-6-0 in the 1970s, although this is no longer in production. In 1983, Mainline's model was reintroduced to their catalogue as locomotive 75033 in BR lined black.
