= BR Standard Class 3 2-6-2T =

Class of British steam locomotive

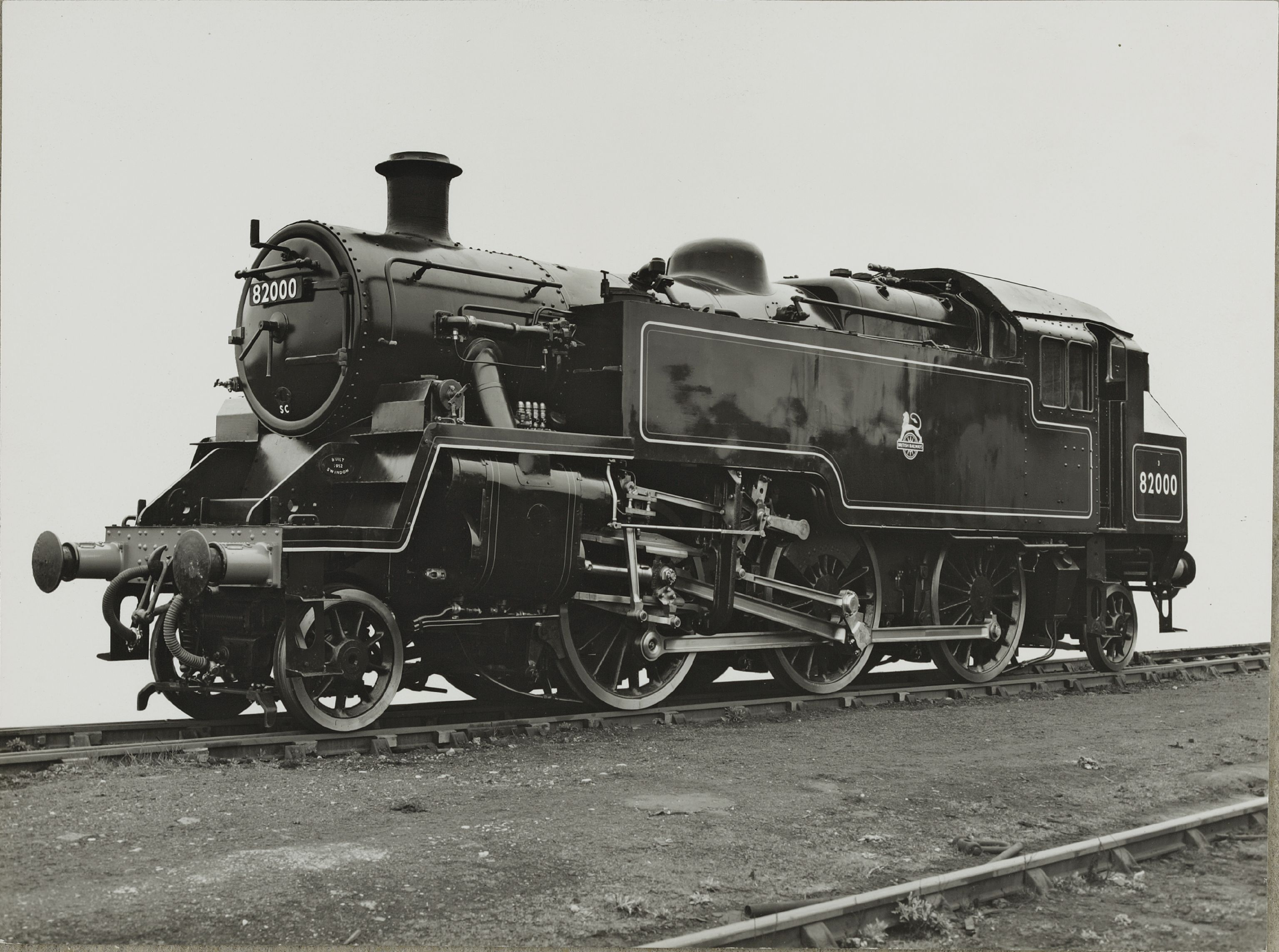
- BR No. 82000 in 1952.
Type and origin
- Power type: Steam
- Designer: R. A. Riddles
- Builder: Swindon Works
- Build date: April 1952 – August 1955
- Total produced: 45
Specifications
- Configuration
  - Whyte: 2-6-2T
  - UIC: 1′C1′ h2t
- Gauge: 4 ft 8 1/2 in (1,435 mm)
- Leading dia.: 3 ft 0 in (0.914 m)
- Driver dia.: 5 ft 3 in (1.600 m)
- Trailing dia.: 3 ft 0 in (0.914 m)
- Length: 40 ft 10 1/2 in (12.46 m)
- Width: 8 ft 6 in (2.59 m)
- Height: 13 ft 0 in (3.96 m)
- Axle load: 16.30 long tons (16.56 t; 18.26 short tons)
- Adhesive weight: 48.75 long tons (49.53 t; 54.60 short tons)
- Loco weight: 74.05 long tons (75.24 t; 82.94 short tons)
- Fuel type: Coal
- Fuel capacity: 3.00 long tons (3.05 t; 3.36 short tons)
- Water cap.: 1,500 imp gal (6,800 L; 1,800 US gal)
- Firebox
  - Grate area: 20.35 sq ft (1.891 m^{2})
- Boiler: BR6
- Boiler pressure: 200 psi (1.38 MPa)
- Heating surface
  - Firebox: 118.42 sq ft (11.002 m^{2})
  - Tubes and flues: 923.54 sq ft (85.800 m^{2})
- Superheater
  - Heating area: 184.50 sq ft (17.141 m^{2})
- Cylinders: Two, outside
- Cylinder size: 17.5 in × 26 in (444 mm × 660 mm)
Performance figures
- Tractive effort: 21,490 lbf (95.6 kN)
- Factor of adh.: 5.08
Career
- Operators: British Railways
- Power class: 3MT
- Numbers: 82000–82044
- Axle load class: Route availability 4 BR (WR): yellow
- Withdrawn: February 1964 – July 1967
- Disposition: All original locomotives scrapped; one new-build under construction

The BR Standard Class 3 2-6-2T was a class of steam locomotive designed by Robert Riddles for British Railways. It was essentially a hybrid design, the chassis being closely based on and sharing a number of parts with the LMS Ivatt Class 4, and having a boiler derived from a GWR No.2 boiler as fitted to the GWR Large Prairie 2-6-2T and 5600 Class 0-6-2T tank engines.

== Design details ==
The design and construction took place at the ex-GWR Swindon Works, along with the 2-6-0 tender engine version of the class. Although the boiler shared flanged plates with the GWR No.2 boiler the barrel was shortened by 5 13/16 in (14.8 cm) and a dome added. They did not share the same driving wheels as the Doncaster-designed BR Standard Class 4 2-6-0 (76XXX), which were the same diameter and piston stroke and thus crank-pin throw.

In common with a number of the other BR Standard Classes, the chassis design used a number of LMS-designed components including Brake Hanger Brackets, Flexible Stretcher Brackets and Reversing Shaft Brackets.

The cylinder covers of engines as built were fitted with "screw-in" type pressure relief valves. From September 1955 revised cylinder covers were introduced for renewals incorporating "bolt-on" type pressure relief valves.

Although the chassis had many almost identical parts to the LMS Ivatt Class 4 the motion brackets were derived from the design of those fitted to the LMS Ivatt Class 2 2-6-0 and LMS Ivatt Class 2 2-6-2T.

Unlike a number of the larger BR Standards the exhaust steam manifold within the smokebox saddle was a steel fabrication that was part of the welded saddle. In a number of the large BR standards (BR Standard Class 6 and Class 7 engines) the exhaust steam manifold was a steel casting welded into the saddle during manufacture.

== Service ==
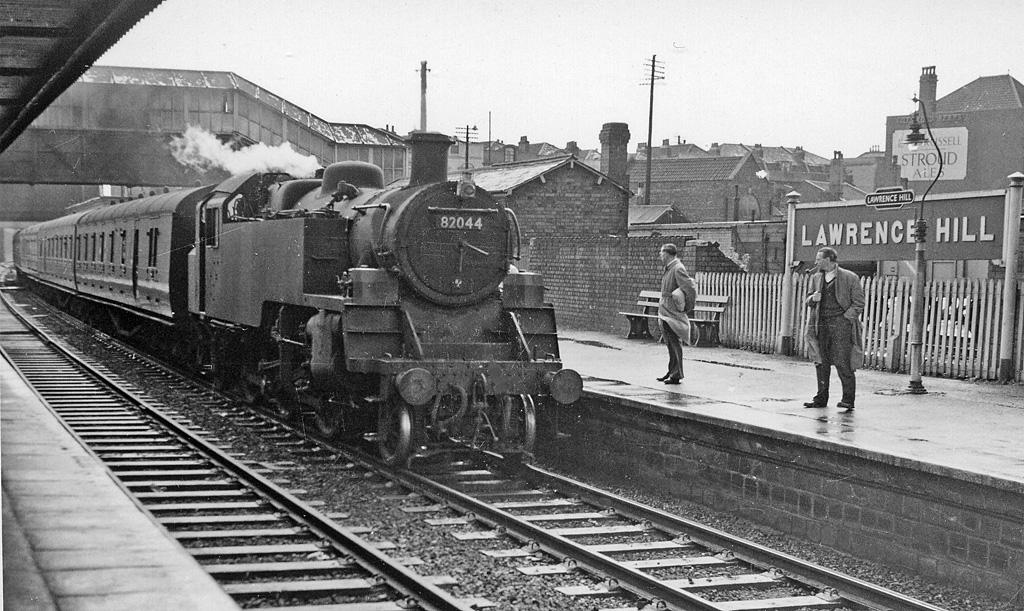
82044 at Lawrence Hill station in 1958.

From new, they were based on the Western Region, Southern Region, North Eastern Region and London Midland Region. The class had a short life as most of the work that they had been built for soon disappeared with the branch lines and the introduction of DMU services on shorter routes. The shortest lived was 82043, only 8 years 8 months old at withdrawal; the longest lived was 82019, two months short of its fifteenth birthday. The class' design life, however, was 40 years. There were plans to build locomotives nos. 82045–82062, however, these were cancelled.

The last two Class 3 tanks in service were nos. 82019 and 82029 at Nine Elms but four more survived until after the end of steam. Nos. 82000, 82003, 82031 and 82034 were transferred from North Wales at the end of 1966 to Patricroft shed in Manchester for use on local suburban trains. They were not really required there however, but nevertheless they lingered there until the shed's closure in 1968. One of these four had run very few miles since its final overhaul, and enquiries were made about saving it, but the price being asked (£1,500, approximately equivalent to £29,800 in 2024) was too high and they went for scrap at Cashmore's in Newport, South Wales, being broken up as late as October 1968.

== Livery and numbering ==
When delivered new the class all carried BR lined Mixed Traffic black livery. From 1957 onwards, those members of the class based on the Western Region started to receive lined green livery. From the early 1960s, some Western Region class members also received unlined green livery as an economy measure. Those class members allocated to other regions retained lined black livery until withdrawal.

One curiosity was 82044 which was painted in green livery by the Western Region but then repainted in black livery after it was transferred away. During this repaint, it mistakenly received a power classification 4 numeral which it carried until withdrawal.

== Withdrawal ==
Table of withdrawals
Year	Quantity in service at start of year	Quantity withdrawn	Locomotive numbers	Notes
1964	45	10	82002/07–08/11–15/25/43	
1965	35	17	82004–05/10/16–17/20–22/32–33/35–40/42	
1966	18	16	82000–01/03/06/09/18/23–24/26–28/30–31/34/41/44	
1967	2	2	82019/29	

== Accidents and incidents ==
- On 16 October 1961, locomotive No. 82028 was hauling a freight train which ran away whilst approaching Robin Hoods Bay, North Riding of Yorkshire. As another train was approaching in the opposite direction, it was diverted into a siding where it crashed through the buffers.

== New Build: 82045 ==
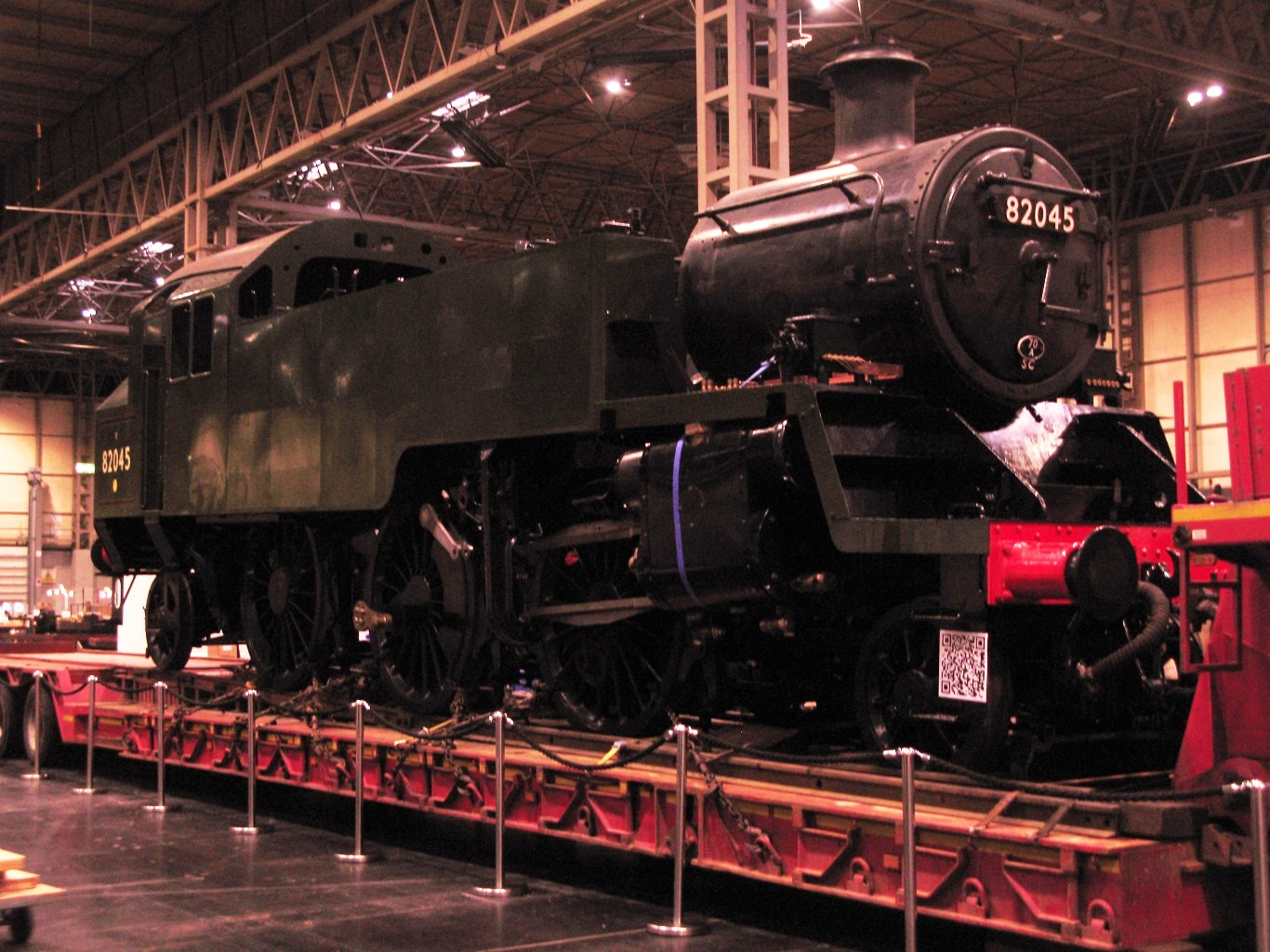
The part-built 82045 in November 2022 without its boiler

None of the original members of the class has survived. However, a registered charity, the 82045 Steam Locomotive Trust, is building a "new" class 3 tank locomotive to carry the next number in line had it been built under BR auspices. The Trust believes that a sprightly performance will be delivered through the 17½" x 26" cylinders. This, coupled with the modest axle load, will make the locomotive an ideal design for today's heritage railways.

The locomotive is under construction at the Severn Valley Railway with the frames, cab, driving wheels, smokebox and cylinders assembled. Further parts and patterns continue to be amassed. With construction work on the new engine advancing every week the Trust classifies 82045 as the 1001st steam locomotive to a BR Standard design since the commencement of its construction follows that of 72010 Hengist.

Unlike a number of other "new-build" projects the group building 82045 will equip the locomotive with a traditional riveted boiler complete with copper firebox.

The 16-spoke driving wheels from BR standard class 4 2-6-0 No.76080 – which was broken up at Barry scrapyard in early 1972 – which are stored at Eardington Halt, were to have been used for the new build. However, the subsequent discovery that the BR standard class 3s were fitted with 17-spoke wheels of the same diameter has led to the decision that these will not be used. The Engine House management has agreed for the wheelset from 76080 to become an external exhibit there.

The 82045 Locomotive Trust believes that significant costs will be avoided as many of the required cast parts can be made from patterns held by fellow members of the British Railways Standard Locomotive Owners Group (BRSLOG) including the pattern for the pony truck wheels.

== Models ==
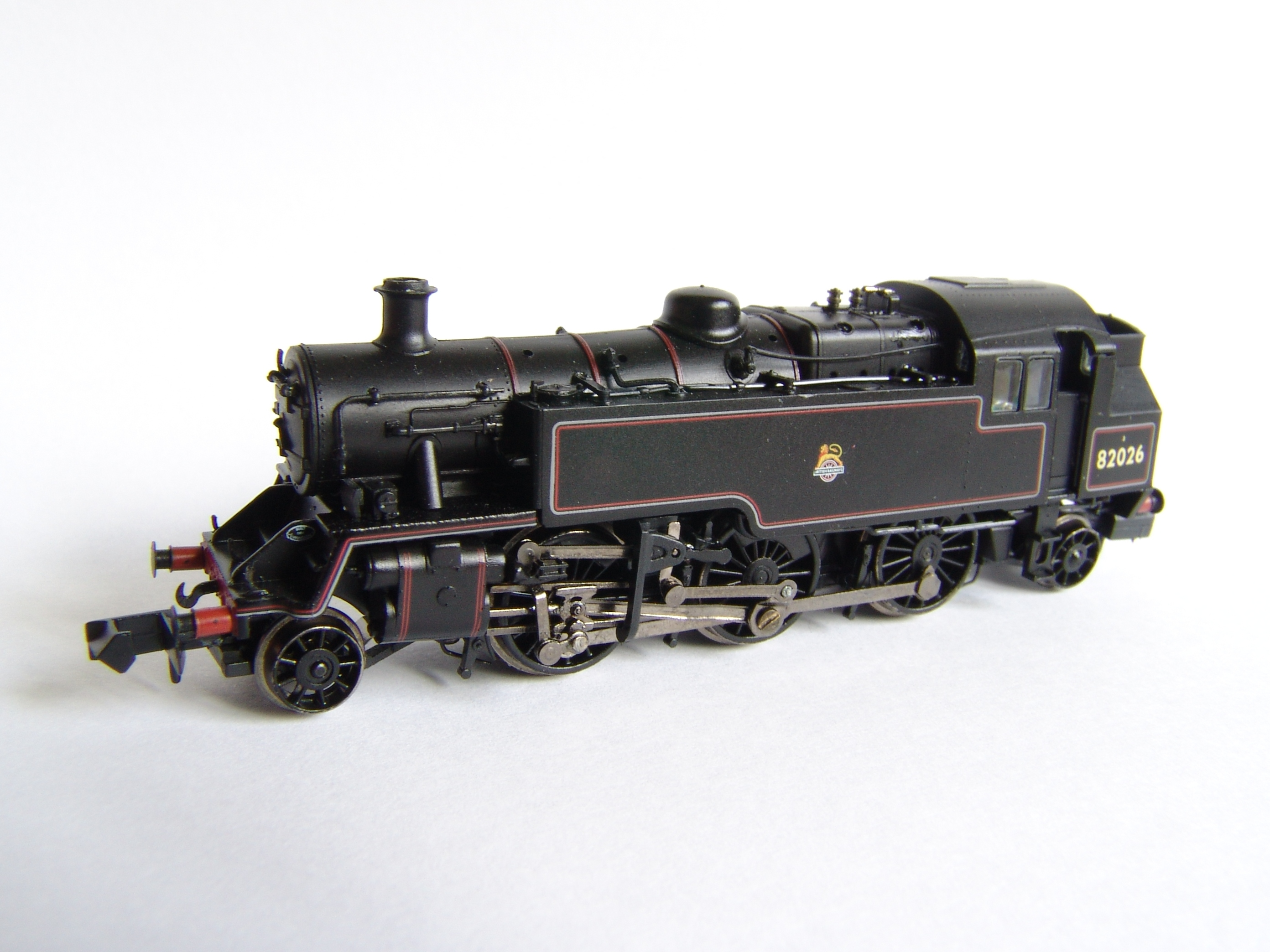
A Graham Farish N scale model of 82026.

Tri-ang produced an OO gauge model of the locomotive in BR Green and BR Black although this was by modern standard under-detailed being produced in the 1960s. Bachmann announced a brand new OO gauge model in February 2009. The Bachmann model has been released periodically in both BR Black and BR Green, with variations differing from lined and unlined liveries and with both the BR Early Emblem and the BR Crest logos. The latest versions were announced in the 2019 Bachmann Branchline Catalogue and were released in 2023.

A British N gauge version has also been released by Bachmann under their Graham Farish brand.
