= BR Standard Class 3 2-6-0 =

British steam locomotive class (1954–1967)

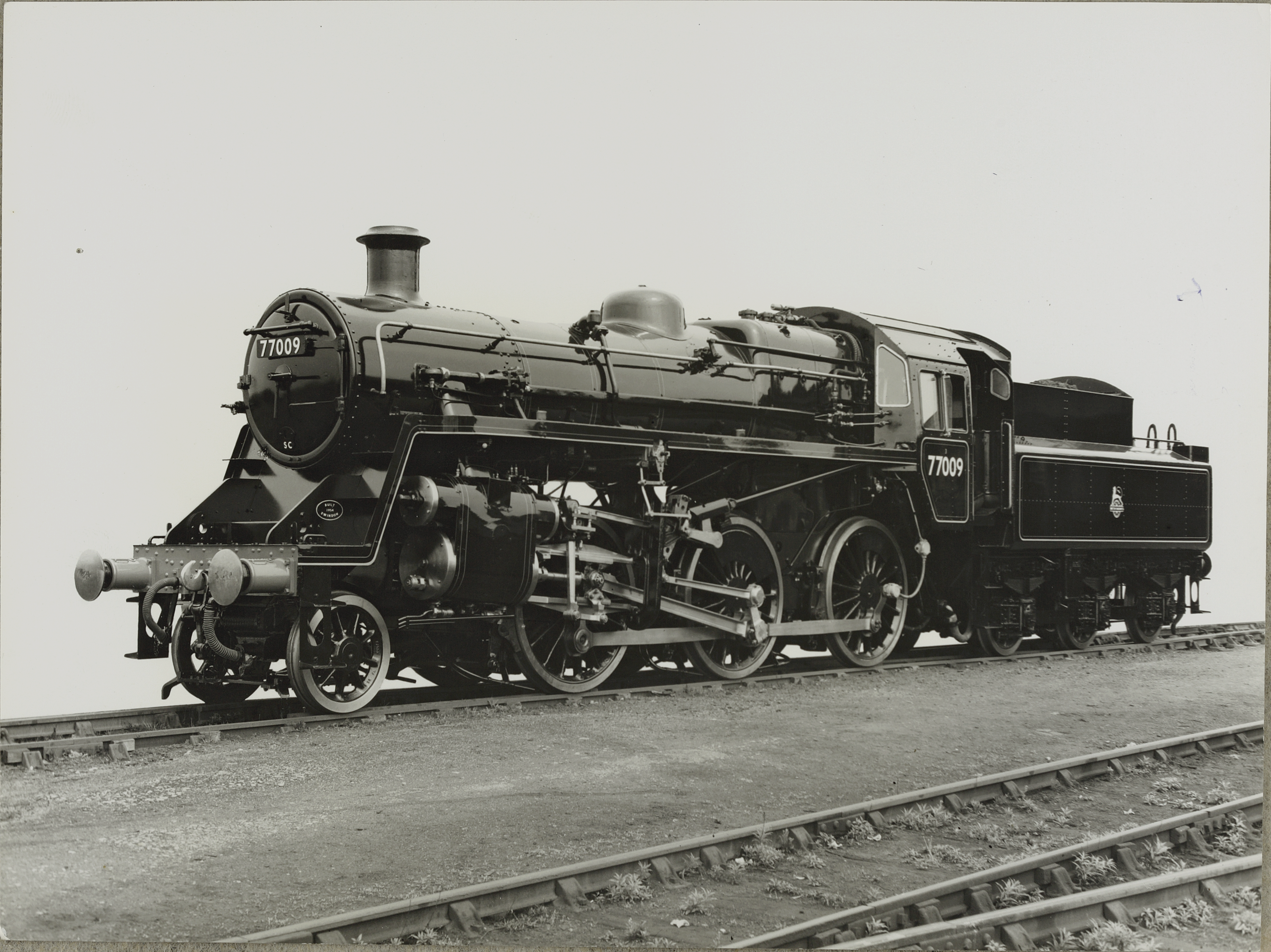
- British Railways No. 77009
Type and origin
- Power type: Steam
- Designer: Robert Riddles
- Builder: BR Swindon Works
- Build date: February – September 1954
- Total produced: 20
Specifications
- Configuration
  - Whyte: 2-6-0
  - UIC: 1′C h2
- Gauge: 4 ft 8 1/2 in (1,435 mm) standard gauge
- Leading dia.: 3 ft 0 in (0.914 m)
- Driver dia.: 5 ft 3 in (1.600 m)
- Length: 55 ft 11 1/4 in (17.05 m)
- Width: 8 ft 5 5/8 in (2.58 m)
- Height: 13 ft 0 in (3.96 m)
- Axle load: 16.25 long tons (16.51 t; 18.20 short tons)
- Adhesive weight: 48.5 long tons (49.3 t; 54.3 short tons)
- Loco weight: 57.5 long tons (58.4 t; 64.4 short tons)
- Tender weight: 42.15 long tons (42.83 t; 47.21 short tons)
- Tender type: BR2A
- Fuel type: Coal
- Fuel capacity: 6 long tons (6.1 t; 6.7 short tons)
- Water cap.: 3,500 imp gal (16,000 L; 4,200 US gal)
- Firebox
  - Grate area: 20.35 sq ft (1.891 m^{2})
- Boiler: BR6
- Boiler pressure: 200 psi (1.38 MPa)
- Heating surface
  - Firebox: 118.42 sq ft (11.002 m^{2})
  - Tubes and flues: 923.54 sq ft (85.800 m^{2})
- Superheater
  - Heating area: 184.50 sq ft (17.141 m^{2})
- Cylinders: Two, outside
- Cylinder size: 17.5 in × 26 in (444 mm × 660 mm)
Performance figures
- Tractive effort: 21,490 lbf (95.6 kN)
- Factor of adh.: 5.05
Career
- Operators: British Railways
- Power class: 3MT
- Numbers: 77000–77019
- Axle load class: Route availability 4
- Withdrawn: 1965–1967
- Disposition: All scrapped

The BR Standard Class 3 2-6-0 was a class of mixed traffic steam locomotive designed by Robert Riddles for British Railways. It was essentially a hybrid design, the chassis being closely based on and sharing a number of parts with the LMS Ivatt Class 4, and having a boiler derived from a GWR No.2 boiler as fitted to the GWR Large Prairie 2-6-2T and 5600 Class 0-6-2T tank engines.

== Design details ==
The design and construction took place at the ex-Great Western Railway Swindon Works, along with the 2-6-2 tank engine version of the class, though some details were designed at Brighton, Derby and Doncaster. Although the boiler shared flanged plates with the GWR No.2 boiler the barrel was shortened by 5 13/16 in (14.8 cm) and a dome added. They did not share the same driving wheels as the Doncaster-designed BR Standard Class 4 2-6-0 (76XXX), which were the same diameter and piston stroke and thus crank-pin throw.

In common with a number of the other BR Standard Classes, the chassis design used a number of LMS-designed components including Brake Hanger Brackets, Flexible Stretcher Brackets and Reversing Shaft Brackets.

The cylinder covers of engines as built were fitted with "screw-in" type pressure relief valves. From September 1955 revised cylinder covers were introduced for renewals incorporating "bolt-on" type pressure relief valves.

Although the chassis had many almost identical parts to the LMS Ivatt Class 4 the motion brackets were derived from the design of those fitted to the LMS Ivatt Class 2 2-6-0 and LMS Ivatt Class 2 2-6-2T.

Unlike a number of the larger BR Standards the exhaust steam manifold within the smokebox saddle was a steel fabrication that was part of the welded saddle. In a number of the large BR standards (BR Standard Class 6 and Class 7 engines) the exhaust steam manifold was a steel casting welded into the saddle during manufacture.

== Service ==
Only 20 were built, numbers 77000–77019, all at Swindon Works. None were preserved, though some components were saved from scrapyards for use on a project to build a new Standard Class 3 2-6-2T. They were the last steam locomotive class on British Railways to begin withdrawal.

=== Operation ===
Their operations were mainly restricted to the North Eastern and Scottish Regions of British Railways, although 77014 ended service on the Southern Region as it was transferred from Northwich depot on the London Midland Region to Guildford depot on the Southern Region in March 1966; it was withdrawn in July 1967.

Other operations were in some more remote areas, such as 77011 which worked the Haltwhistle - Alston line from 1955.

=== Withdrawal ===
Withdrawals
Year	Number in service at start of year	Number withdrawn	Locomotive numbers
1965	20	1	77010
1966	19	16	77000–01/03–09/11/13/15–19
1967	3	3	77002/12/14
