= List of locomotives formerly resident on the Watercress Line =

Many steam and diesel locomotives have operated on the Watercress Line or Mid-Hants Railway, a heritage railway in Hampshire, England.

== Steam locomotives ==
Number & Name	Class	Current Status	Location	Livery	Photograph
Kent No. 2	W.G. Bagnall 0-4-0ST	Was the first locomotive to arrive on the Mid-Hants Railway at Alresford in July 1973. Assisted in the loading of Slough Estates No. 3 in 1974 at Alresford. Now based at the Foxfield Railway. Currently out of service at the Chasewater Railway.	Chasewater Railway	Lined Red	
Slough Estates Ltd No.3	Hudswell Clarke & Co 0-6-0ST	Supplied new to the Slough Estates Railway in 1926, No.3 left industrial service in working order, moving to the Mid Hants in 1974 when the Slough Estates Railway was closed. Some time later, No.3 was stripped-down for overhaul, but this was never completed. During the 1980s, No.3 was transferred to the care of the Slough & Windsor Railway Society and moved to Slough, where full restoration commenced. After another move, to the Swindon and Cricklade Railway, restoration was completed and No.3 returned to steam in 2000. A major overhaul was undertaken in 2009 (completed November) in order to renew the locomotive's boiler certificate. Currently undergoing overhaul at the Middleton Railway, where it has resided since 2011.	Middleton Railway	Slough Estates Railway lined green	
No. 10 "Douglas" (Works 2890 WD75041 LMR107 NCB3882)	Hunslet Austerity 0-6-0ST	Operational – Built for the War Department in 1943 as 75041, the engine was later moved to the Longmoor Military Railway and was renumbered 107, later sold into industrial use with the Nation Coal Board before being preserved in 1976. Purchased for use on the Mid Hants line in the late 1990s the engine was rebuilt and converted from a saddle tank to a 0-6-0 tender configuration resembling 'Douglas' from the Thomas the Tank Engine series. The tender frame was a former LMS Fowler 3500 gallon example purchased from British Railways after use as an internal user vehicle but with a new body of a unique design. After several years of use on the line the engine and tender were sold to a private owner and subsequently moved to the Ribble Steam Railway, the engine is now operational following an overhaul.	Ribble Steam Railway	LNER lined black, number on tender.	
No. 701 "Franklin Roosevelt" (3278)	USATC S160 Class 2-8-0	Under overhaul – Purchased from Greece in 1984 and delivered to the Mid-Hants, where the locomotive was restored and finished as Longmoor Military Railway 701 and named after the 32nd president of the US. The locomotive left the line and moved to the South Coast Steam. It has since moved to Tyseley to continue its overhaul.	Tyseley Locomotive Works	n/a	
No. 5224	GWR 5205 Class 2-8-0T	Loan period completed and relocated from Ropley March 2012.	Peak Rail	BR Black	
No. 3672 "Dame Vera Lynn"	WD Austerity 2-10-0	Under heavy overhaul – Purchased from Greece in 1984 along with 90775 and 701 but sold and delivered to the Lavender Line at Isfield in August 1984. The locomotive was quickly overhauled and became active again in August 1985 when the locomotive was named Dame Vera Lynn by the Dame herself. The locomotive was finished in a fictional livery of BR passenger lined green with 'WD' branding on the tender and numbered as WD 3672. The locomotive was later sold and moved to the Mid-Hants in early 1986 where the engine was examined and found to require some major repairs, the locomotive was not steamed or used on the line and with no available space in the works queue for several years the owner moved to engine the North Yorkshire Moors Railway in December 1986. 3672 was steaming again in April 1989 and consistently ran high mileages on the Yorkshire line however by November 1998 the locomotive was withdrawn pending a works overhaul and placed in store. Overhaul began in 2016.	North Yorkshire Moors Railway	Lined Green	
No. 30075 (62-669)	JŽ Class 62 0-6-0T	Now at Shillingstone for the work to be carried out.	Shillingstone Railway Project	Pseudo BR Black	
No. 30076 (66-521)	JŽ Class 62 0-6-0T	Now stored at Shillingstone awaiting restoration.	Shillingstone Railway Project	N/A	
No. 30120	LSWR T9 Class 4-4-0	Operational – Preserved by British Railways via the NRM, this locomotive was stored until 1981 when loaned to the Mid Hants Railway and restored to working order in 1983. During 1991 the loan was ended and 30120 was relocated to the Swanage Railway for the remaining duration of its boiler certificate. In 1994, the locomotive was moved to the Bluebell Railway for display and storage until 2008 when again moved, to the Bodmin and Wenford Railway, for another restoration to working order. This was completed on 11 August 2010 when 30120 was returned to operational condition, the engine is now based at the Swanage Railway. No. 30120 has visited the Watercress Line recently in 2013 and 2016.	Swanage Railway	BR Lined Black	
30925 Cheltenham	SR V Schools class 4-4-0	Built in 1934, part of the National Collection. Operated at the Watercress Line between 2012 and 2022, before moving to the National Railway Museum at York in July 2024.	National Railway Museum	BR Brunswick Green, Late Crest	
No. 31625	SR U Class 2-6-0	Stored - Purchased from Barry Scrapyard and moved to the Mid-Hants in 1980. The locomotive has been out of service since 2001 and has been painted as James the Red Engine. It departed the line in August 2014 following the expiration of its loan agreement and is currently stored at Swanage following cosmetic restoration.	Swanage Railway	BR Lined Black	
No. 31806	SR U Class 2-6-0	Purchased from Barry Scrapyard and moved to the Mid-Hants in 1976. This locomotive returned to service following overhaul in 2010 and departed the line in September 2014 for Swanage following the expiration of its loan agreement. It is the only surviving example of a rebuilt SR K Class 2-6-4T.	Swanage Railway	BR Lined Black	
No. 31874	SR N Class 2-6-0	Under Overhaul - Purchased from Barry Scrapyard and moved to the Mid-Hants in 1974. The locomotive has been out of service since 1997 and it departed the line in August 2014 following the expiration of its loan agreement and is currently being overhauled to working order for use on the Swanage Railway.	Herston Works	N/A	
No. 34016 "Bodmin"	SR West Country Class 4-6-2	Stored - Purchased from Barry Scrapyard and a member of the Mid-Hants locomotive fleet for many years, while also spending a period of time running on the mainline. The locomotive departed the line in June 2014 following the expiration of its loan agreement and is currently stored at Carnforth pending overhaul.	Carnforth MPD	BR Lined Green	
34058 Sir Frederick Pile	SR Battle of Britain Class 4-6-2	Built in 1947. Relocated from the Avon Valley Railway in December 2010. Transferred to Southern Locomotives Ltd in 2023.	Sellindge, Southern Locomotives Ltd	N/A	
No. 34067 "Tangmere"	SR Battle of Britain class 4-6-2	Mainline Operational – Purchased from Barry Scrapyard and delivered to the Mid-Hants where initial restoration began. Very active on both heritage and mainline railways over the years. She returned to steam in 2021 and is now mainline certified, owned and operated by West Coast Railway Company.	Carnforth MPD	BR Lined Green	
No. 34073 "249 Squadron"	SR Battle of Britain class 4-6-2	Stored – Purchased from Barry Scrapyard and delivered originally to Brighton Railway Museum. A move to the Mid-Hants followed, before a further move to the East Lancs Railway. It was moved again to Carnforth in 2014.	Carnforth MPD	n/a	
No. 35009 "Shaw Savill"	SR Merchant Navy Class 4-6-2	Under restoration – Placed on the Mid Hants Railway for a while during the 1980s/1990s. She is presently undergoing restoration at Riley and Son Ltd to modern mainline standards.	East Lancashire Railway	n/a	
No. 35018 "British India Line"	SR Merchant Navy Class 4-6-2	Mainline operational – Purchased from Barry Scrapyard in 1980, restoration started and had reached an advanced stage in 2003 when the engine left for South Coast Steam. She is now operational on the mainline and based at Carnforth. Restoration was completed in June 2017.	Carnforth MPD	BR Lined Green	
No. 44123	LMS Fowler Class 4F 0-6-0	Under restoration – Purchased from Barry Scrapyard and delivered to the Mid-Hants where initial restoration began, later moved to the Avon Valley Railway in 1984.	Avon Valley Railway	n/a	
No. 45231 "The Sherwood Forester"	LMS Stanier Class 5 4-6-0 4-6-0	Mainline operational – Purchased from British Railways directly in 1968, 45231 has been very active on both heritage and mainline railways over the years. 45231 arrived on the Mid Hants in February 2005 and was used on both mainline tours and local work on the railway, the Black Five departed in January 2007 to the East Lancs Railway. It is now based at Crewe under the ownership of Icons of Steam Ltd.	Crewe Diesel TMD	BR Lined Black	
No. 47324	LMS Fowler Class 3F 0-6-0T	Under overhaul – Purchased from Barry Scrapyard and delivered to the Mid-Hants where initial restoration began, moved to Avon Valley line and then to the East Lancs Railway.	East Lancashire Railway	BR Black	
No. 60019 "Bittern"	LNER Class A4 4-6-2	Stored awaiting overhaul - Left July 2010 when its contract expired. After being based at Southall, it returned to the Mid-Hants in 2015 after its mainline ticket expired. It once again left in October that year, first for the Bluebell Railway for a gala, then to Crewe, and now at the Hornby visitor center.	Hornby Visitor Center	LNER Garter Blue	
No. 68011 (196) "Errol Lonsdale"	Hunslet Austerity 0-6-0ST	Operational – Purchased from Kent & East Sussex Railway and used in the early years of operations gaining the nickname of 'puddle jumper', the engine was later sold and left the railway. Later painted faux BR livery and numbered 68011 as a LNER Class J94 on the South Devon Railway the engine was resold to a line in Belgium and exported in 2009.	Stoomcentrum Maldegem	BR Black	
No. 76017	BR Standard Class 4 2-6-0	Operational. Built in 1954. Purchased by Private Owner in 1970's and arrived at Mid Hants Railway in 1978. Following overhaul 76017 returned to steam in 1984. Following second overhaul returned to steam in 2016. Following change of ownership the engine departed the MHR by rail behind a BR Class 33 no 33025 on a move to the Bluebell Railway in October 2022 for the railway's "autumn steam gala". Later moved by rail to Southall Motive Power Depot in November 2022. On loan to the Kent & East Sussex Railway.	Southall MPD	BR Black, Early Crest	
No. 90775 ("Sturdee")	WD Austerity 2-10-0	Undergoing restoration – Purchased from Greece in 1984 and delivered to the Mid-Hants where the locomotive was restored and finished in both fictions BR livery as 90775 in 1986 and later as Longmoor Military Railway 601 and named "Sturdee" after the Lieutenant General Sir Vernon Ashton Hobart Sturdee. Sold to a group on the North Yorkshire Moors Railway in 1992 the locomotive left that line in 2003 and was sold to Midland and Great Northern Joint Railway Society on the North Norfolk Railway. She was renamed "The Royal Norfolk Regiment" in September 2017.	North Norfolk Railway	BR Black	
No. 600 ("Gordon")	WD Austerity 2-10-0	Static Display - Was at the Mid-Hants for a short time in 1980.	Severn Valley Railway	LMR Blue	

== Diesel locomotives ==
Number	Class	Current Status	Location	Livery	Photograph
601 (890) "General Lord Robertson"	Sentinel/Rolls-Royce 0-8-0DH	In Service – Last new locomotive to be delivered to the Longmoor Military Railway in 1963. Moved to the Mid Hants in 1985 and again moved to the Avon Valley in 1987 following transmission damage and damage to point work around Ropley.	Avon Valley Railway	LMR Blue	
12049	BR Class 11	Scrapped - Undergoing body repairs and repaint, when heavily damaged by fire on 26 July 2010, which consumed the Mid Hants railway carriage and paint shop. Replacement locomotive 12082 was purchased as its replacement and was renumbered 12049. Later returned to its original 12082 number.	N/A	N/A	
12139	BR Class 11	In Service – Arrived on the Mid-Hants in 1982 and left in 1983, this locomotive is identical to the BR Class 11, however this example never served with the LMS or British Railways and carries the next number in the class sequence.	North Yorkshire Moors Railway	BR Black	
25067 (D5217)	BR Class 25	In Service	Battlefield Line Railway	BR Green	
27007 (D5353)	BR Class 27	Moved to the Caledonian Railway	Caledonian Railway (Brechin)	BR Green	
33012 (D6515)	BR Class 33	In Service	Swanage Railway	BR Blue	
D6836 (37905)	BR Class 37	Departed the Railway in 2015. In use at UK Rail Leasing's depot in Leicester as a super shunter.	Leicester	BR Green	
45132	BR Class 45	Under Overhaul. Relocated in September 2014 to the Epping and Ongar Railway. Built in 1961. One of the first batch of 'Peak' diesels, it has a split headcode box for corridor working, which was never used in active service. Withdrawn from British Rail in 1987.	Epping Ongar Railway	BR Blue	
73003 (E6004) "Sir Herbert Walker"	BR Class 73	In Service	Swindon and Cricklade Railway	BR Green	
L721 formed 51363 (DMBS), 59510 (TCL), 51405 (DMS)	BR Class 117	3 car DMU. Operational.	Now in service on the Gloucestershire Warwickshire Railway	BR Green	
W55003 (DMBS)	BR Class 122	Single railcar. Undergoing overhaul. Has a Main-line Certification.	Gloucestershire Warwickshire Railway	BR Green	
