= NS 5000 (1946) =

Anglo-Dutch steam locomotive

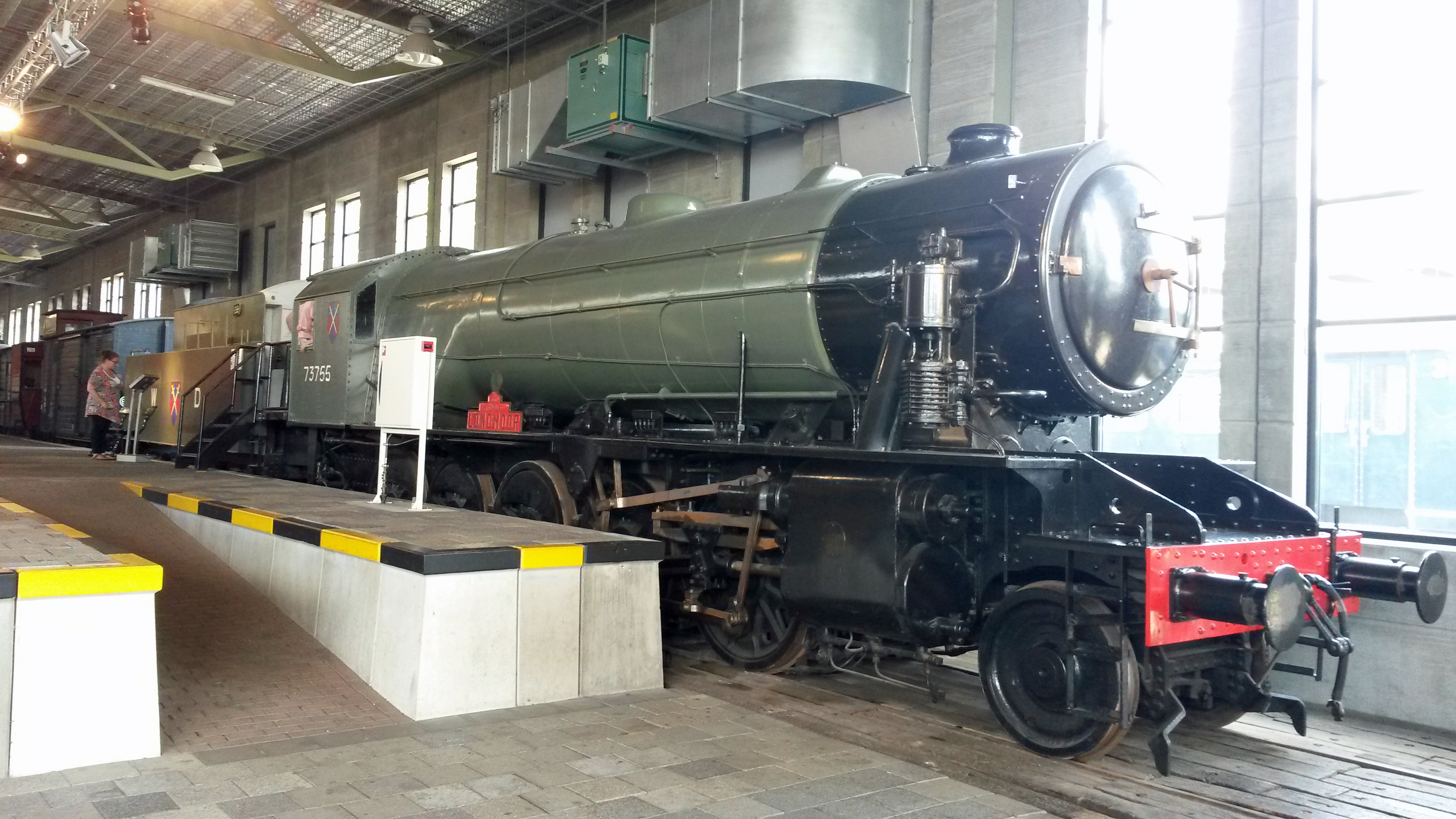
Type and origin
- Power type: Steam
- Designer: Robert Riddles
- Builder: North British Locomotive Company
- Build date: 1946
- Total produced: 103
Specifications
- Configuration
  - Whyte: 2-10-0
  - UIC: 1′E h2
- Gauge: 4 ft 8 1/2 in (1,435 mm)
- Length: 20,579 mm (67 ft 6.2 in)
- Height: 4,487 mm (14 ft 8.7 in)
- Loco weight: 79.6 t (87.7 short tons; 78.3 long tons)
- Tender weight: 56.4 t (62.2 short tons; 55.5 long tons)
- Fuel type: Coal
- Fuel capacity: 9.1 t (10.0 short tons; 9.0 long tons)
- Water cap.: 22.7 m^{3} (5,000 imp gal)
- Firebox
  - Grate area: 3.72 m^{2} (40.0 sq ft)
- Boiler pressure: 12 bar (170 psi) (was 15.8 bar (229 psi))
- Heating surface
  - Firebox: 17.3 m^{2} (186 sq ft)
  - Tubes: 150.5 m^{2} (1,620 sq ft)
- Superheater
  - Heating area: 47.5 m^{2} (511 sq ft)
- Cylinders: 2
- Cylinder size: 483 mm × 711 mm (19.0 in × 28.0 in)
- Valve gear: Walschaerts
Performance figures
- Maximum speed: 65 km/h (40 mph)
- Tractive effort: 95.12 kN (21,380 lbf) (was 152.20 kN (34,220 lbf))
Career
- Operators: WD » NS
- Nicknames: Big Jeeps
- Withdrawn: 1948 - 1952
- Preserved: 1 in the Netherlands

The NS 5000 was a series of steam locomotives of the Dutch Railways (NS), taken over from the British War Department.

The locomotives, with wheel arrangement 1′E (2-10-0), were built between 1943 and 1945 by the North British Locomotive Company in Glasgow for the British War Department to transport goods to the British Army during the war against Nazi Germany in mainland Western Europe. Their low axle load of 13.7 tons made them very suitable for running on makeshift or repaired railway lines.

A number of locomotives were used in areas south of the Netherlands during the British occupation. Around October 1945, the engines were taken out of service and put into storage.

In order to get railway traffic going after the German surrender in May 1945, the class was used in place of native Dutch engines that were destroyed or damaged during the war. At the beginning of 1946, it was decided that the NS would hire about sixty locomotives as NS 5001-5060 for pulling freight trains. Later this number was supplemented with an additional 43 locomotives, thus the NS 5001-5103 series was created.

The NS soon lowered the steam pressure from 15.8 kg/cm^{2} (225 psi) to 12 kg/cm^{2} (170 psi) and made the chimneys longer to clear the smoke from the driver's view. These locomotives were withdrawn from service between 1948 and 1952.

The 1,000th British-built locomotive shipped to continental Europe was commemorated. This locomotive, with the name "Longmoor" has been preserved in the Dutch Railway Museum in Utrecht and has been brought back in the War Department condition with the number WD 73755.

== Background ==
The NS 5000 1'E (WD 2-10-0) was based on the NS 4300 1'D (WD 2-8-0), and was designed to have interchangeable parts by Robert Riddles. It had the same power output as the 1'D but a lighter axle load, making it suitable for secondary lines.

== Design ==
The class had a parallel boiler and round-topped firebox. While the 1′D (2-8-0) had a narrow firebox, the 1′E (2-10-0) had a wide firebox placed above the driving wheels. This arrangement was common in the United States (e.g. the USRA D (0-8-0)) but unusual in Britain, where wide fireboxes were usually used only where there was a trailing bogie, e.g. in 2′B1′ (4-4-2) and 2′C1′ (4-6-2) types. These were the first 1′E (2-10-0) locomotives to work in Great Britain, and the first major class of ten-coupled engines — they had been preceded by two E (0-10-0) locomotives; the Great Eastern Railway's Decapod and the Midland Railway's Lickey Banker. The 1′E (2-10-0) wheel arrangement was later used by Robert Riddles when he designed the BR Standard Class 9F. This, too, had a wide firebox placed above the driving wheels.

== Construction ==
Two batches were built by the North British Locomotive Company, the first batch of 100 introduced in 1943/1944 and the second batch of 50 in 1945. Their WD Nos were 3650–3749 (later 73650–73749), and 73750–73799.

Twenty of the first batch were sent to the Middle East. During running-in they worked in Britain, but their length made them unsuitable for some lines. Most saw service with the British Army in France after D-Day.

== Preservation ==
NS 5085 (WD 73755) survives in the Dutch Railway Museum (Nederlands Spoorwegmuseum) in Utrecht. It carries the nameplate Longmoor, after the Royal Engineer's base at Longmoor, with the coat of arms of the Royal Engineers above. NS 5085 is alone in preservation in the Netherlands. however there are more locomotives of the class WD Austerity 2-10-0 still around.

== Gallery ==
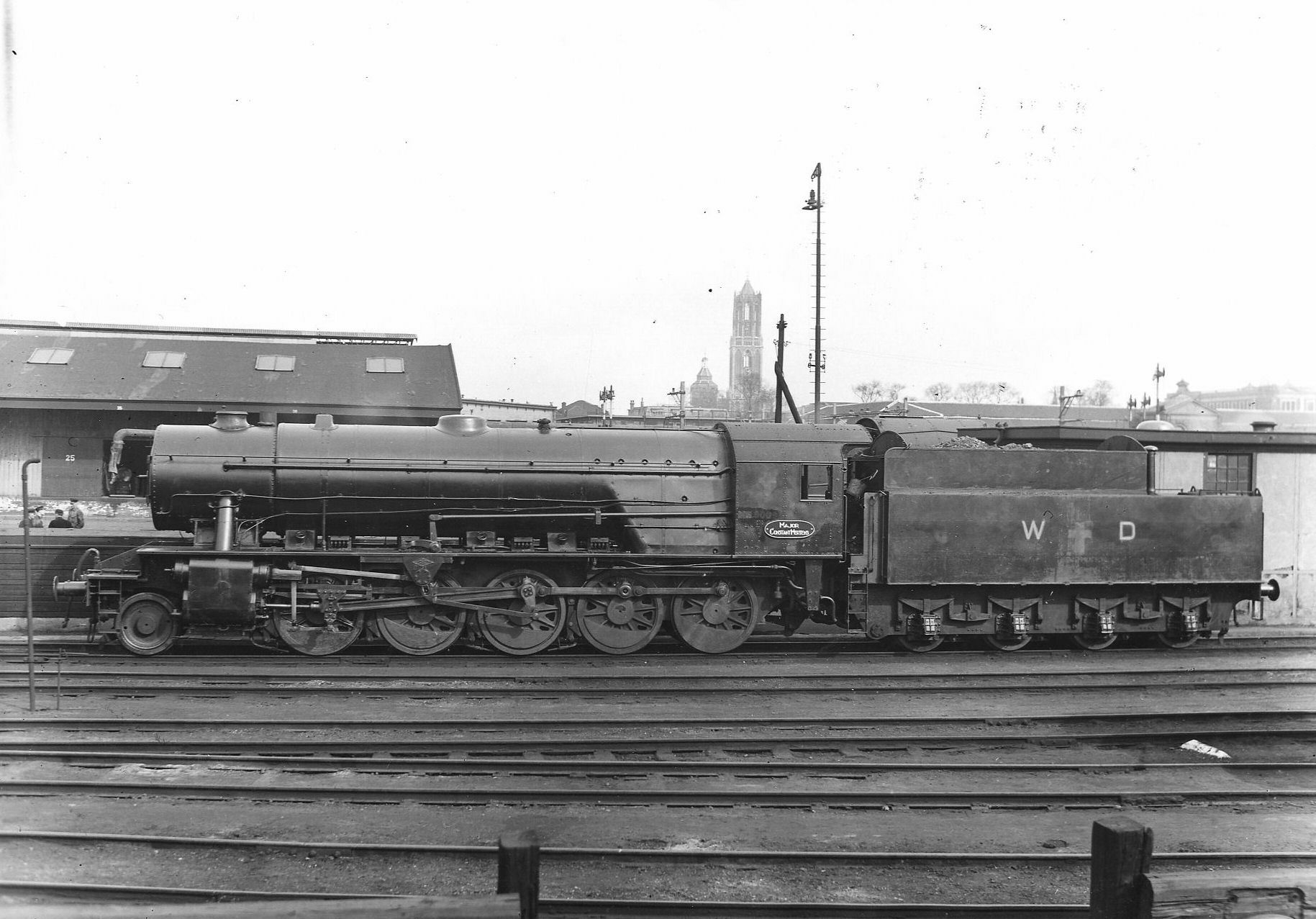
Locomotive 5009 "Major Constant Mertens" (ex-War Department no. 73669) in Utrecht.

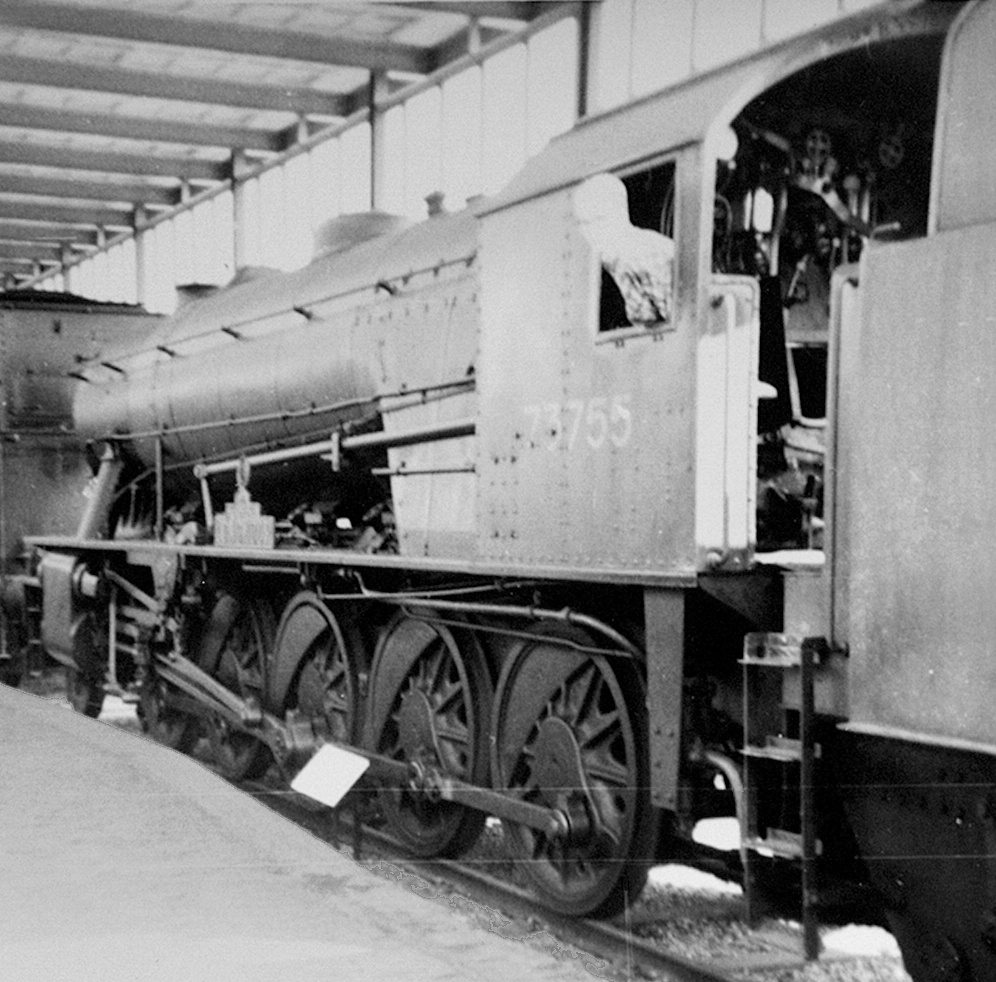
Locomotive "Longmoor" (ex-NS 5085) along the original platform of Utrecht Maliebaan station.

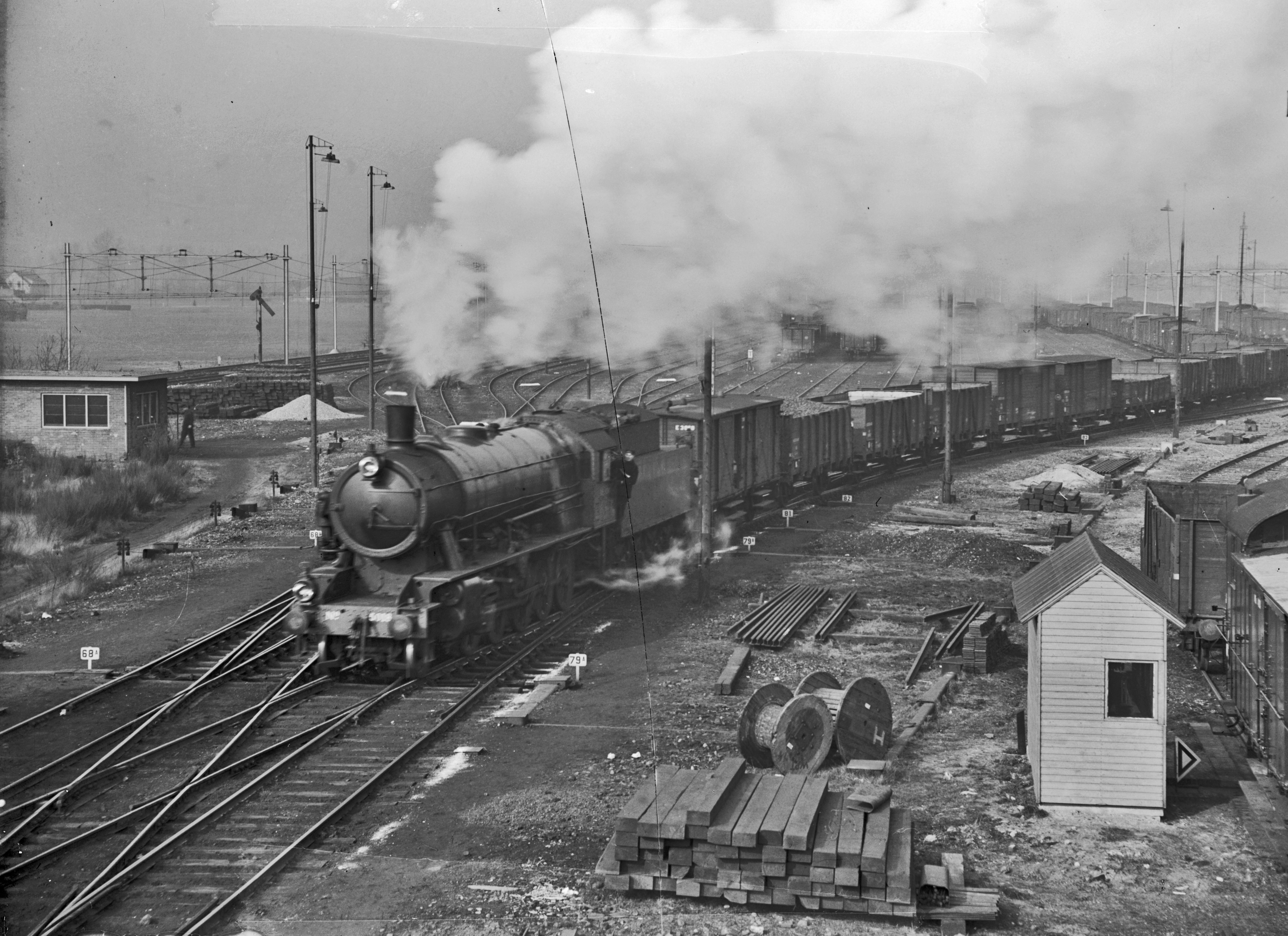
Locomotive NS 5018 (ex-WD 73689) with a goods train in the yard of Susteren.

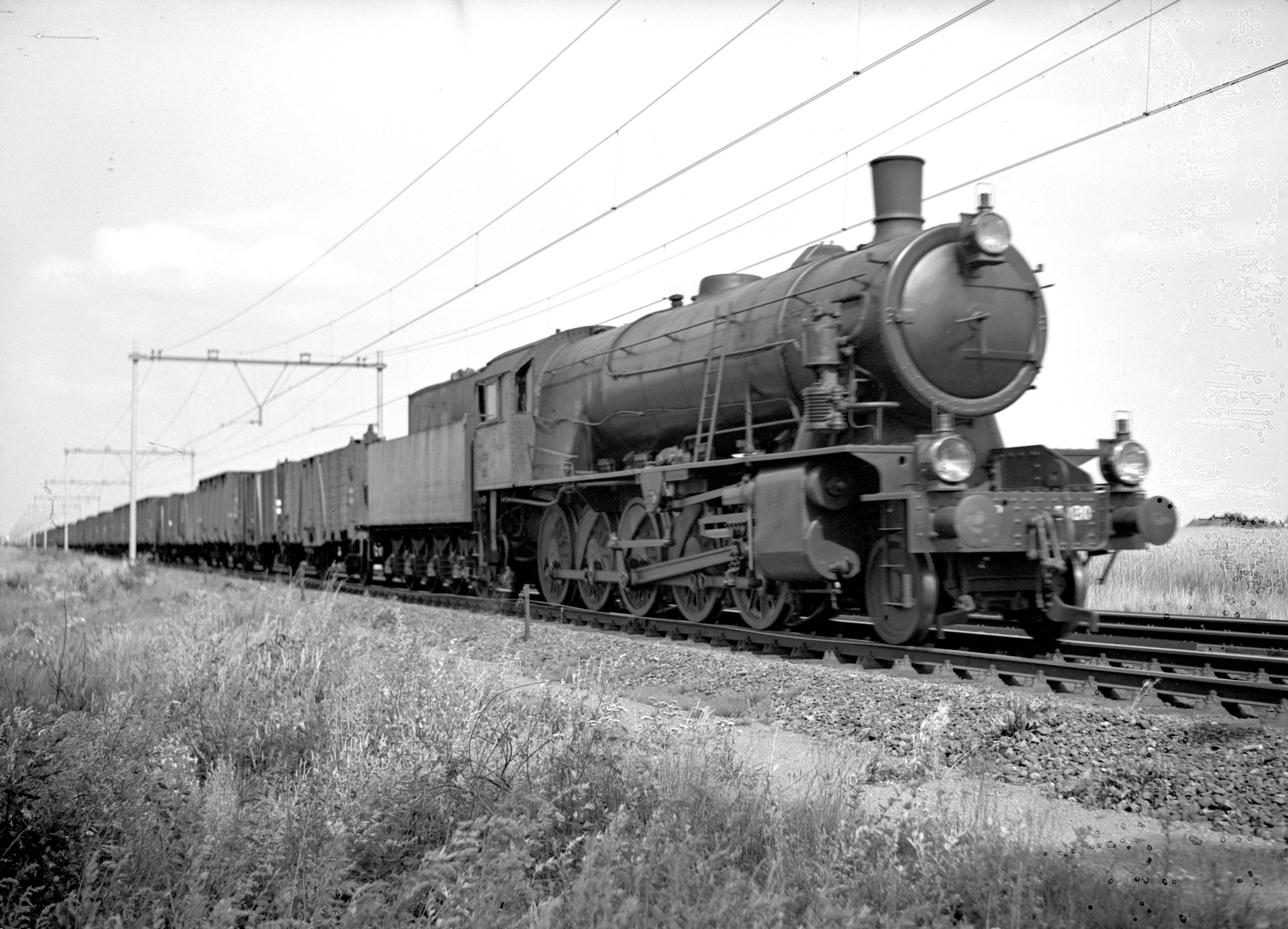
Locomotive NS 5020 (ex-WD 73691) with a goods train near Susteren. Between 1949 and 1952

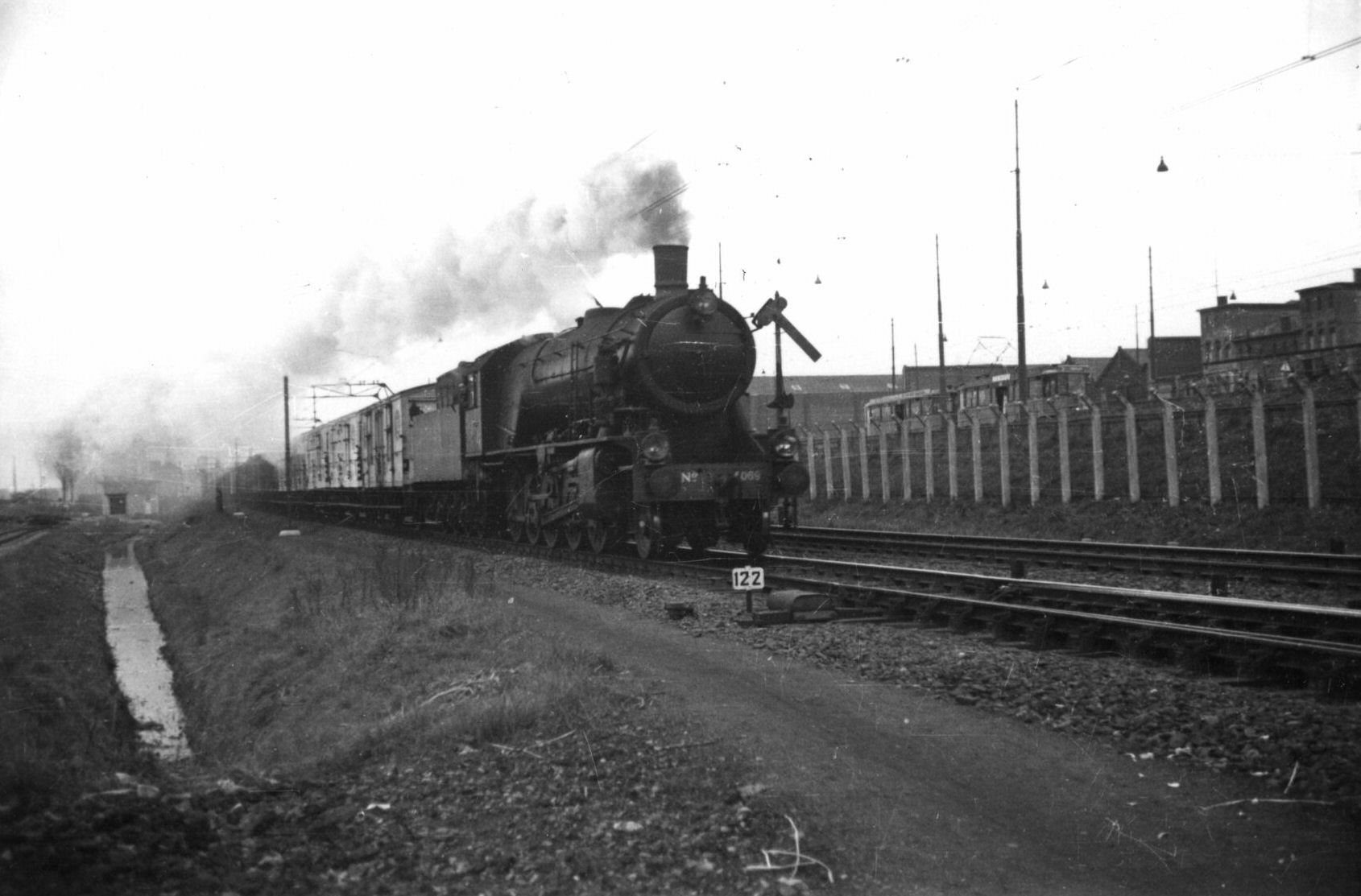
Steam locomotive NS 5069 (ex War Department no. 73723) with a goods train. (Between 1946 - 1952)

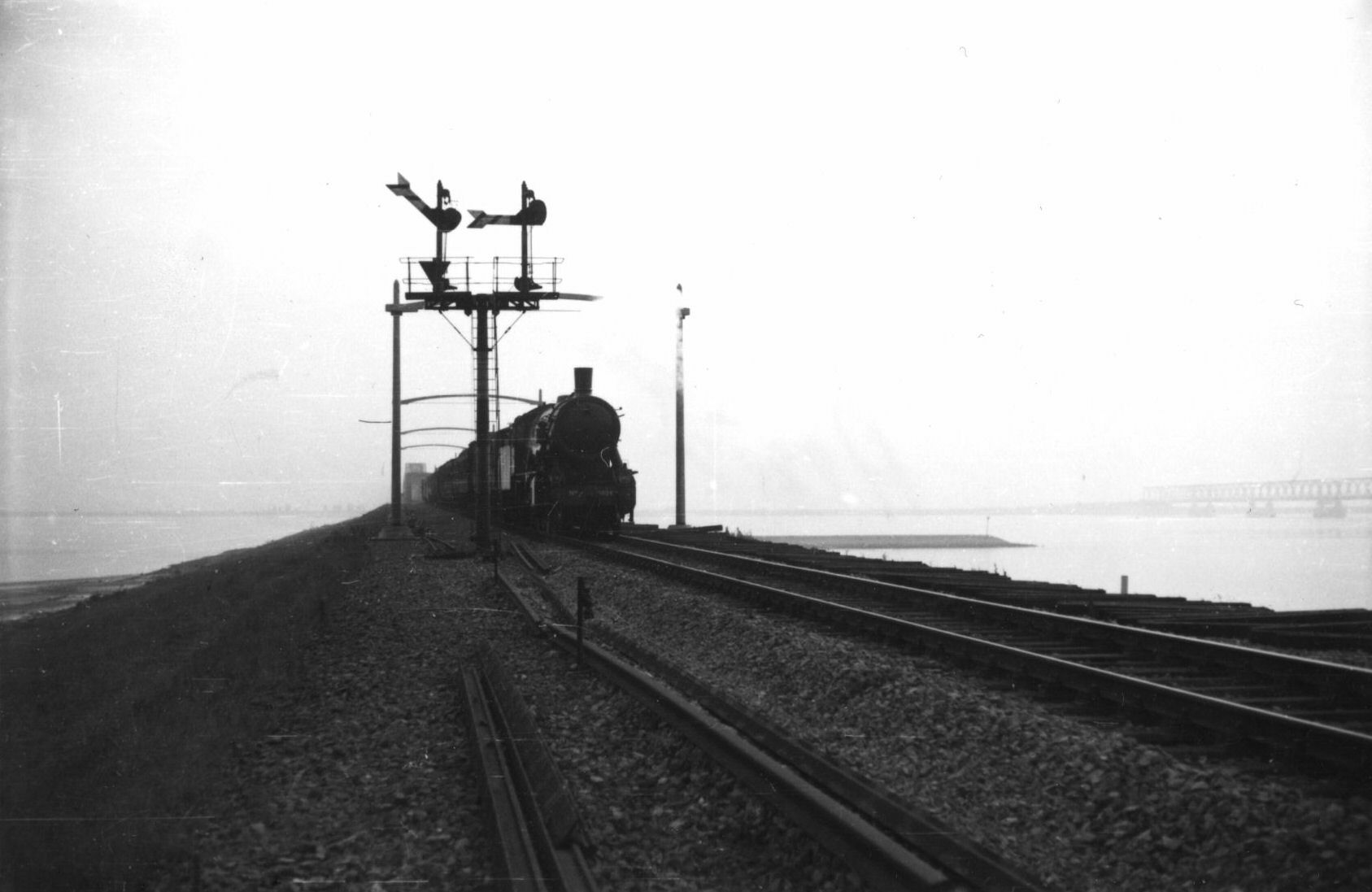
Steam locomotive NS 5014 (ex War Department no. 73676) with a train near Moerdijk. (1948)

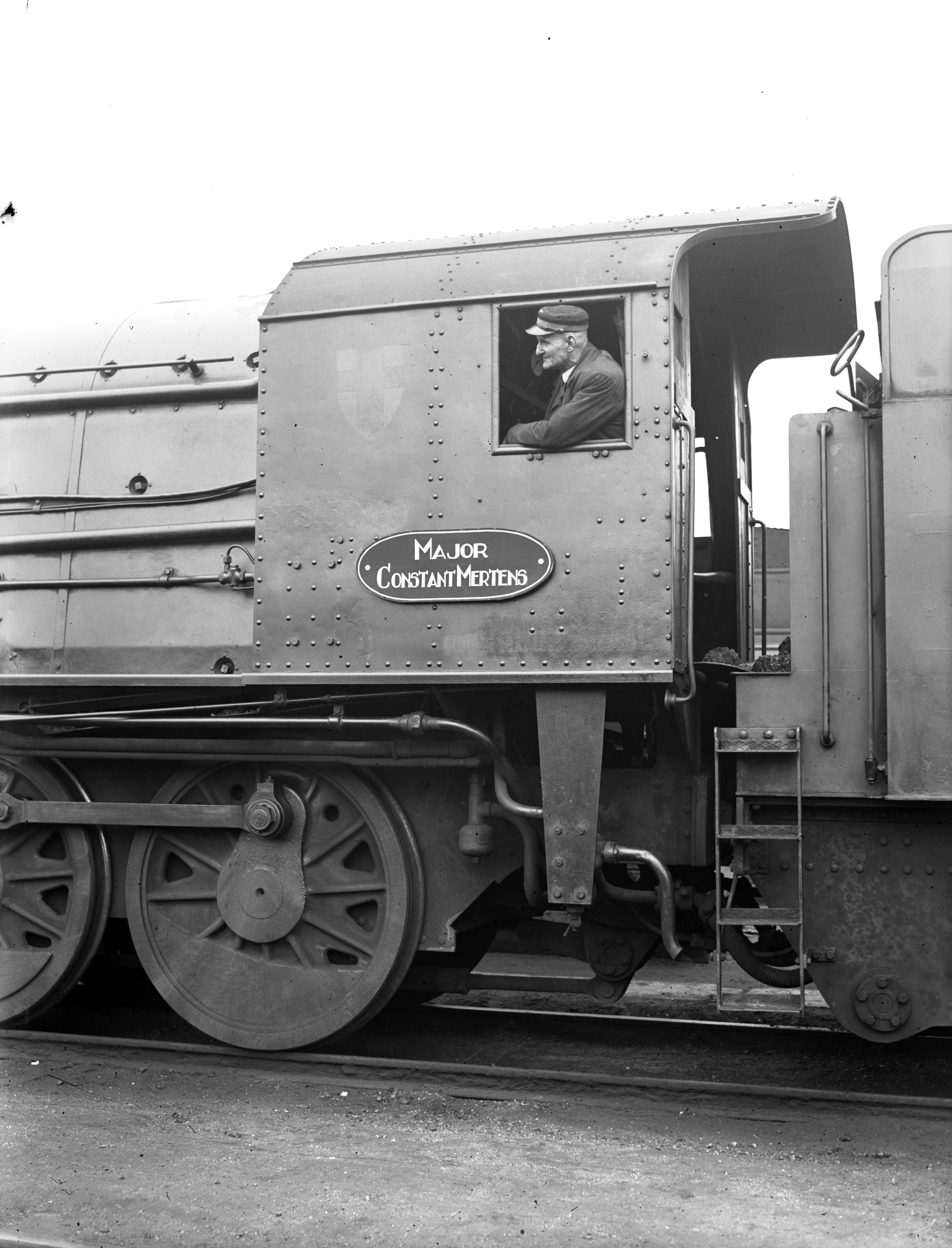
Driver in the cab of steam locomotive NS 5009 (ex War Department no. 73669) with the name "Major Constant Mertens" in Utrecht. (Between 1945 - 1951)

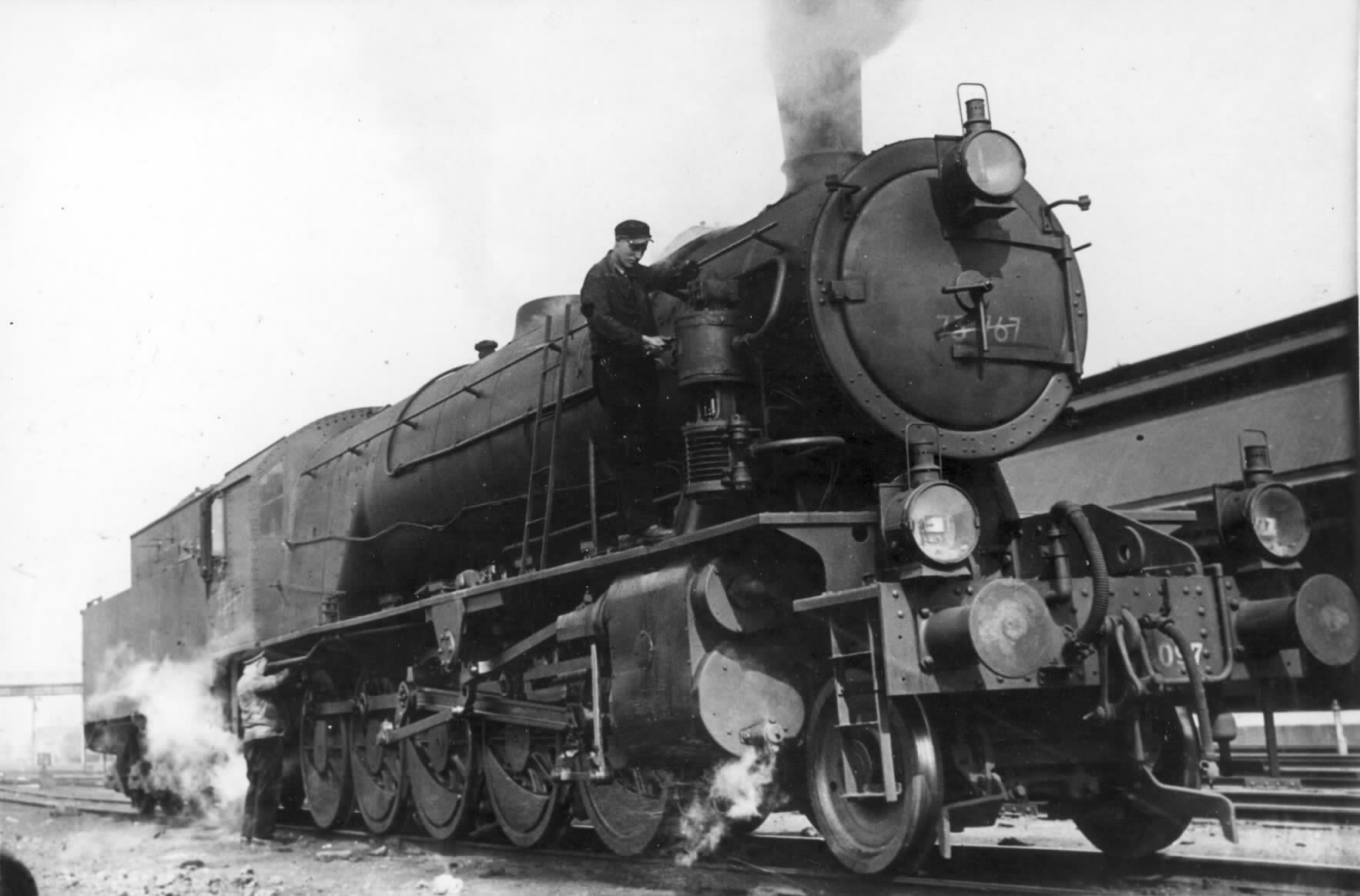
Steam locomotive NS 5097 (series 5000, ex War Department no. 73767). (1946)

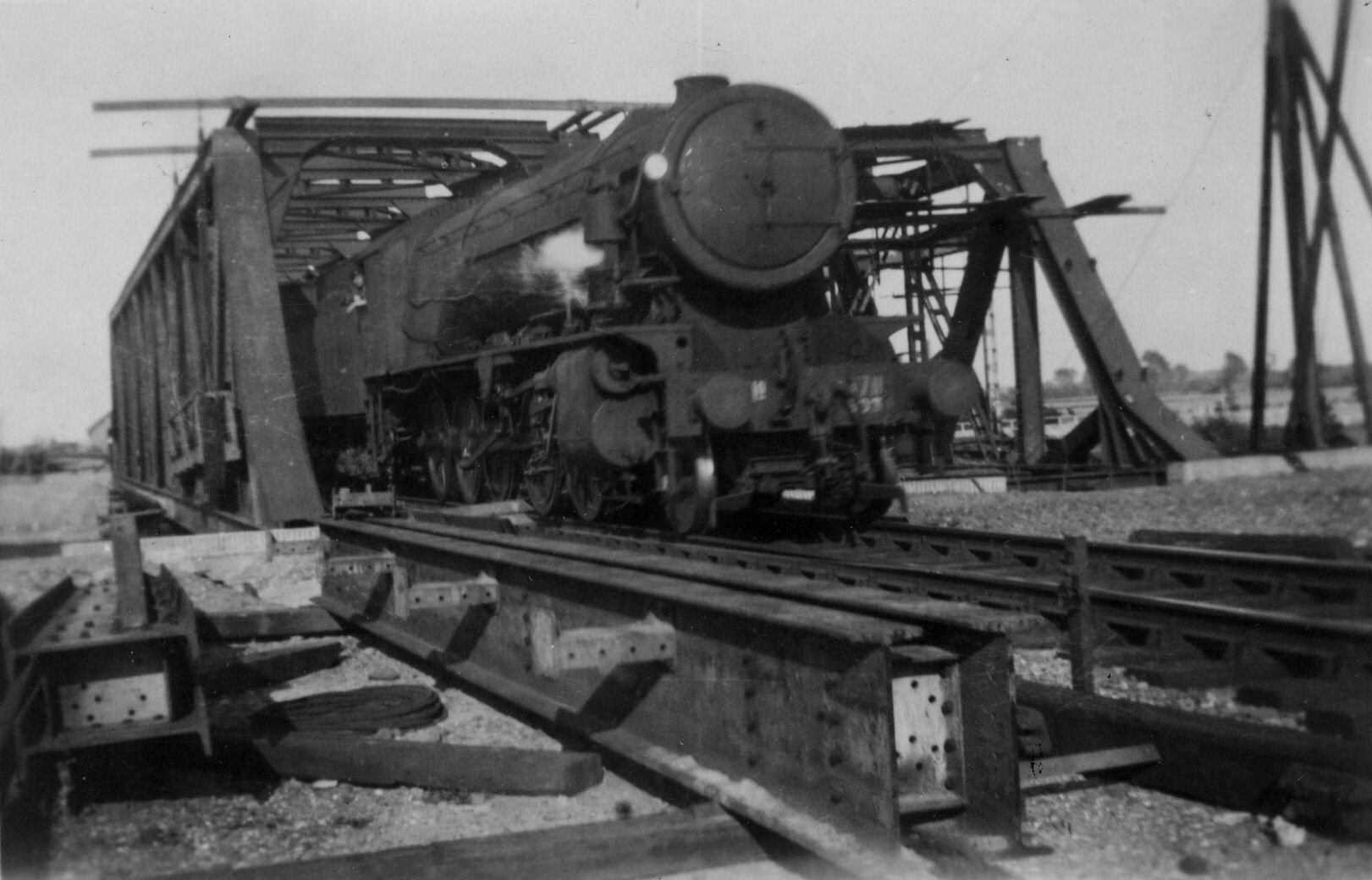
A NS 5000 (ex War Department no. 73711) on the bridge over the Wilhelmina Canal in Tilburg. (04-08-1946)

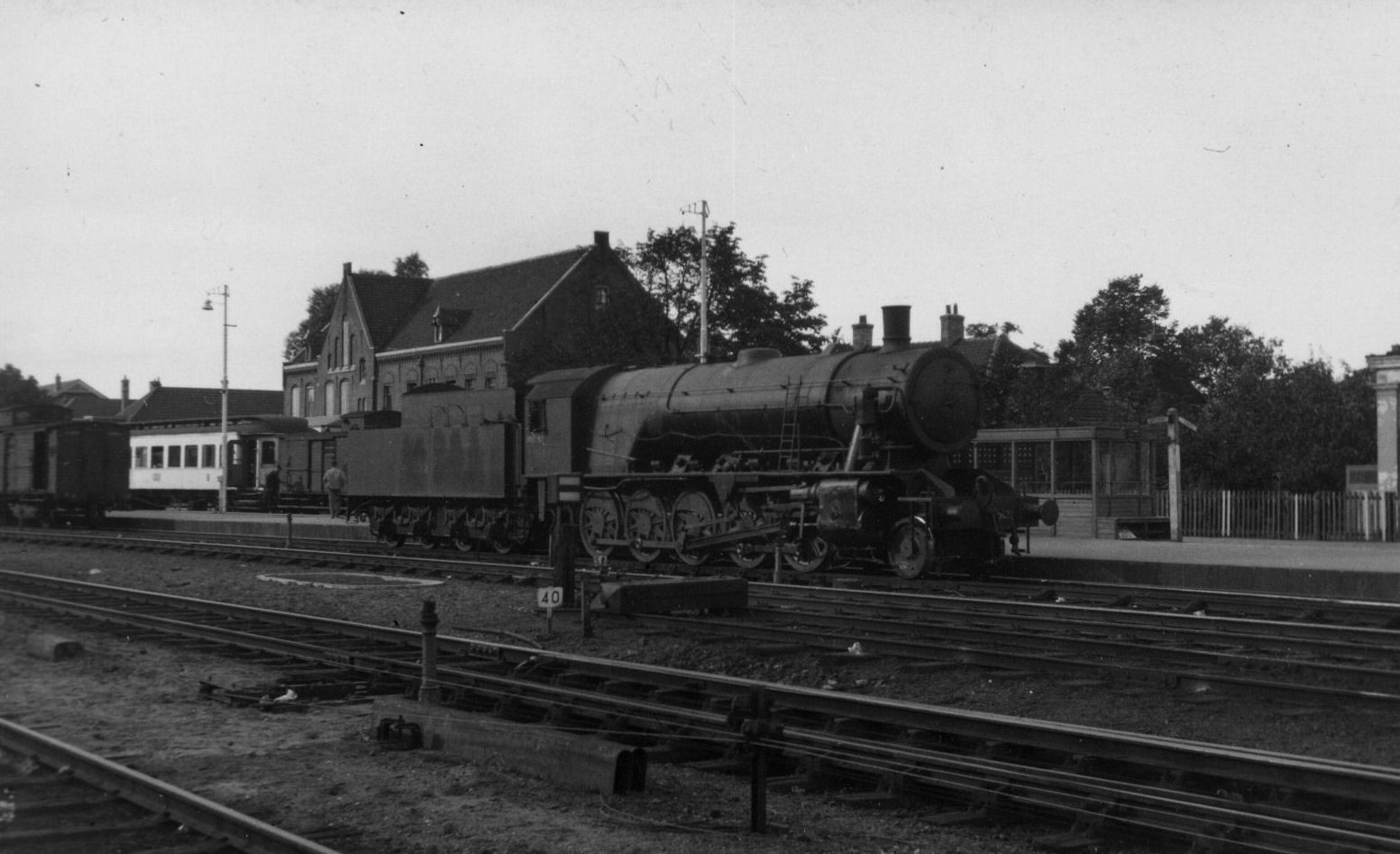
Steam locomotive from the series 5000 (nos. 5001-5103, "Austerities", ex War Department) of the N.S. in Zwolle. (September 1946)

== Sources and references ==
- Waldorp, H. (1981). Onze Nederlandse stoomlocomotieven in woord en beeld. Alkmaar: De Alk. pp. 21–22. ISBN 90 6013 909 7.
- R.C. Statius Muller, A.J. Veenendaal jr., H. Waldorp: De Nederlandse stoomlocomotieven. Uitg. De Alk, Alkmaar, 2005. ISBN 90 6013 262 9
- Het Utrechts Archief
