= BR ex-WD Austerity 2-10-0 =

Class of 25 ex-British War Department locomotives

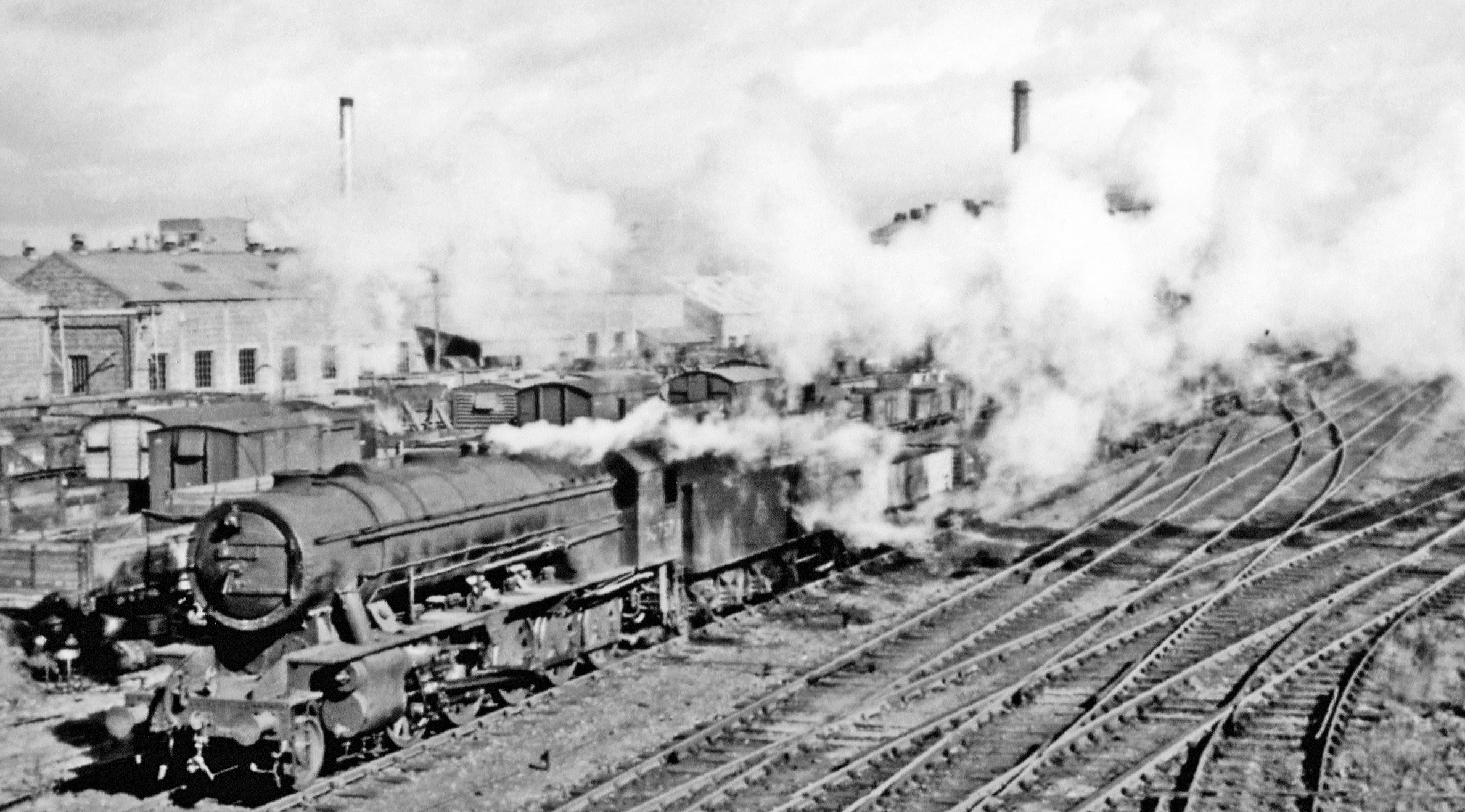
- Ex-WD 2-10-0 leaving Grangemouth in 1957
Type and origin
- Power type: Steam
- Designer: R. A. Riddles
- Builder: North British Locomotive Company
- Build date: 1943–1945
- Total produced: 25
Specifications
- Configuration
  - Whyte: 2-10-0 (specifications from Tourret (1995)
  - UIC: 1′E h2
- Gauge: 4 ft 8 1/2 in (1,435 mm) standard gauge
- Leading dia.: 2 ft 9 in (838 mm)
- Driver dia.: 4 ft 8 1/2 in (1,435 mm)
- Length: 67 ft 6 1/4 in (20.58 m) over buffers
- Axle load: 13 long tons 9 cwt (30,100 lb or 13.7 t)
- Adhesive weight: 67 long tons 3 cwt (150,400 lb or 68.2 t) full
- Loco weight: 78 long tons 6 cwt (175,400 lb or 79.6 t) full
- Tender weight: 55 long tons 10 cwt (124,300 lb or 56.4 t) full
- Fuel type: Coal
- Fuel capacity: 9 long tons 0 cwt (20,200 lb or 9.1 t)
- Water cap.: 5,000 imp gal (23,000 L; 6,000 US gal)
- Firebox
  - Grate area: 40 sq ft (3.7 m^{2})
- Boiler pressure: 225 lbf/in^{2} (1.55 MPa)
- Heating surface
  - Firebox: 192 sq ft (17.8 m^{2})
  - Tubes: 1,170 sq ft (109 m^{2})
  - Flues: 589 sq ft (54.7 m^{2})
- Superheater
  - Heating area: 423 sq ft (39.3 m^{2})
- Cylinders: Two, outside
- Cylinder size: 19 in × 28 in (483 mm × 711 mm)
- Valve gear: Walschaerts
- Valve type: 10-inch (250 mm) piston valves
Performance figures
- Tractive effort: 34,215 lbf (152.20 kN)
Career
- Operators: War Department; British Railways
- Power class: BR: 8F
- Numbers: 90750-90774
- Withdrawn: 1961-1962
- Disposition: All scrapped.

The British Railways (BR) ex-WD Austerity 2-10-0 Class was a class of 25 2-10-0 steam locomotives of the WD Austerity 2-10-0 type purchased in 1948 from the War Department.

== Operational history ==
BR officially listed them in their running stock in 1948, though most were kept in store until 1949–1950. BR allocated them the numbers 90750–74. They were used to haul heavy freight trains and were mostly allocated to Scottish Region ex-LMS (Caledonian) motive power depots in the Central Belt, Motherwell and Grangemouth always being their principal bases, where they were mixed with the much more widespread WD 2-8-0s. They were withdrawn after about 12 years service, between 1961 and 1962. In addition to the above engines, another WD Austerity 2-10-0 Longmoor Military Railway 601 Kitchener (original WD No. 73797) was hired from the War Department between 1957 and 1959.

== Names ==
Both 90773 and 90774 were named North British after the North British Locomotive Company which built them (the last of the BR ex-WD Austerity 2-8-0s No. 90732 was similarly named Vulcan after the Vulcan Foundry). As one of 49 LNER Peppercorn Class A1s, No. 60161, was also named North British, BR had three locomotives with this name, though the A1 was named after the North British Railway rather than the engineering firm.

== Classification ==
They were given the power classification 8F. BR considered them as standard locomotives, numbering them in the numbering series reserved for BR standard engines and assigning them the boiler No. BR11. The tenders were given the classification BR5.

== Stock list ==
BR stock list
BR No.	Name	Former WD No.	Built	Taken into BR stock	Withdrawn
90750	-	73774	June 1945	December 1948	May 1962
90751	-	73775	June 1945	December 1948	December 1962
90752	-	73776	June 1945	December 1948	December 1961
90753	-	73777	June 1945	December 1948	July 1961
90754	-	73778	June 1945	December 1948	July 1961
90755	-	73779	June 1945	December 1948	December 1962
90756	-	73780	June 1945	December 1948	December 1962
90757	-	73781	June 1945	December 1948	December 1962
90758	-	73782	June 1945	December 1948	December 1962
90759	-	73783	June 1945	December 1948	December 1962
90760	-	73784	June 1945	December 1948	May 1962
90761	-	73785	July 1945	December 1948	November 1962
90762	-	73786	July 1945	December 1948	December 1962
90763	-	73787	July 1945	December 1948	December 1962
90764	-	73788	July 1945	December 1948	May 1962
90765	-	73789	July 1945	December 1948	December 1962
90766	-	73790	July 1945	December 1948	December 1962
90767	-	73791	July 1945	December 1948	December 1962
90768	-	73792	August 1945	December 1948	July 1962
90769	-	73793	August 1945	December 1948	December 1962
90770	-	73794	August 1945	December 1948	December 1962
90771	-	73795	August 1945	December 1948	December 1962
90772	-	73796	August 1945	December 1948	December 1962
90773	North British	73797	August 1945	December 1948	December 1962
90774	North British	73798	August 1945	December 1948	December 1962

== Withdrawal ==
Withdrawals started in 1961 and continued at a reasonable pace before the remaining 17 were withdrawn en masse in December 1962.

Year	Quantity in service at start of year	Quantity withdrawn	Locomotive numbers	Notes
1961	25	3	90752–54	
1962	22	22	90750–51/55–74	

== Preservation ==
None of the BR engines were preserved. However, there is a "90775" running in Great Britain which was repatriated from Greece, formerly being WD No.76352, SEK No. Lb951. It is based on the North Norfolk Railway. Ex-WD No. 3672 Dame Vera Lynn, which is under overhaul at North Yorkshire Moors Railway, has been repatriated from Greece as well. There is also ex-WD LMR 600 Gordon which has survived and has been steamed on the Severn Valley Railway, though since 2008 it has been out of service, cosmetically restored and on display in Highley Engine House.

== See also ==
BR ex-WD Austerity 2-8-0

== Bibliography ==
- Tourret, R. (1995) [1976]. Allied military locomotives of the Second World War. Abingdon: Tourret Pub. ISBN 0-905878-06-X. OCLC 1341825021.
