= South Coast Steam =

Steam locomotive operating company

Coordinates: 50°33′2.89″N 2°26′41.64″W

South Coast Steam Ltd is a United Kingdom based steam locomotive operating company, based on the Isle of Portland, Dorset.

Owned by Barry Gambles and incorporated in January 2003, the company is registered along with South Coast Crane Hire in Loughborough, but operationally located in South Coast Crane Hire's main yard on Portland.

== Locomotives ==
Class	Number (&Name)	Image	Current location	Current status
USATC S160 Class	No.701 Franklin Roosevelt (3278)		Portland	Purchased from Greece in 1984 and delivered to the Mid-Hants Railway, where the locomotive was restored and finished as Longmoor Military Railway 701 and named after the 32nd President of the USA. Dismantled. At Tyseley Locomotive Works for overhaul.
SR Merchant Navy class	35018 British India Line		Carnforth MPD	Purchased from Barry Scrapyard in 1980 by the Mid-Hants Railway. Restoration started and had reached an advanced stage in 2003, when the engine left for South Coast Steam. Operational, restored by West Coast Railways at Carnforth MPD in 2017
