= WD Austerity 2-10-0 73755 Longmoor =

Preserved British steam locomotive

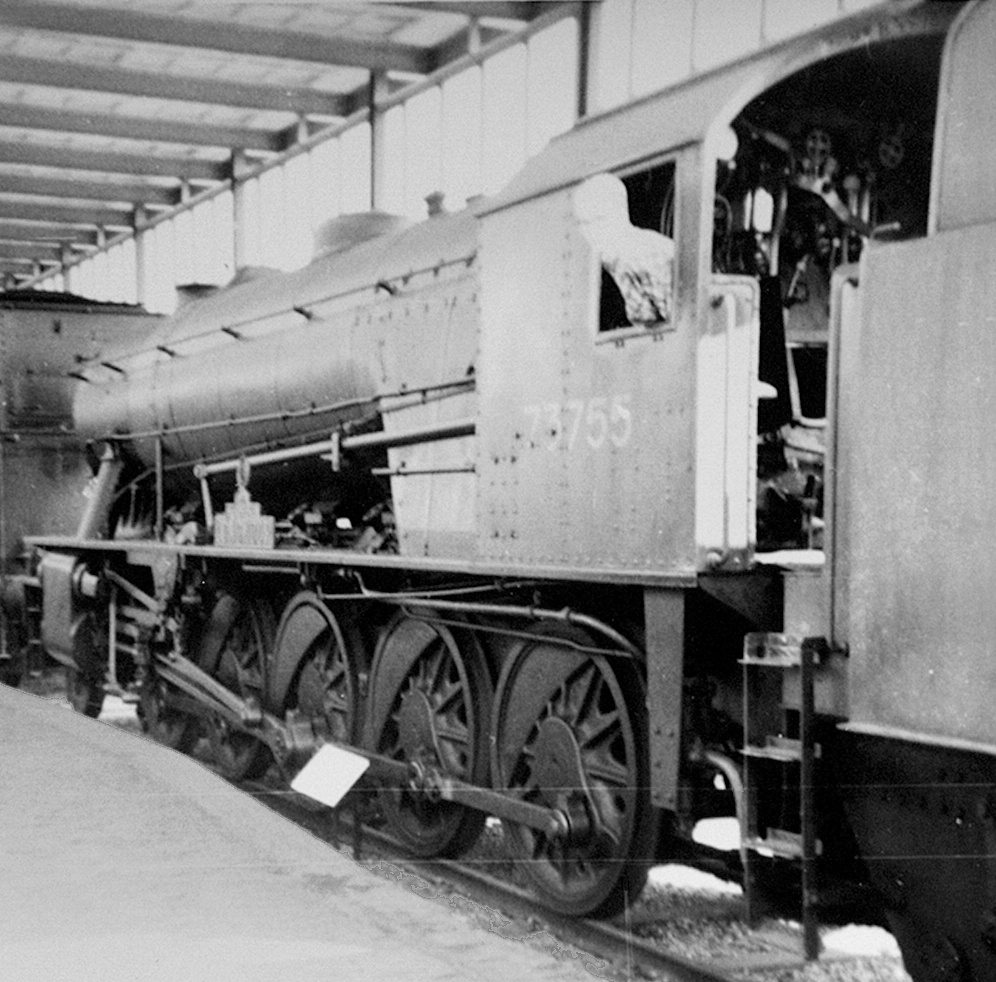
"Longmoor" alongside the original platform at station Utrecht Maliebaan (1965) (Maliebaan Station was originally one of the stations serving Utrecht, and is converted into the national railway museum.)

War Department (WD) Austerity 2-10-0 No. 73755 Longmoor is a preserved steam locomotive.

One of the 150 WD Austerity 2-10-0s all of which were built by the North British Locomotive Company. 73755 was built in 1945, NBL Works No. 25601. It subsequently became the 1000th British built steam locomotive to be ferried to Mainland Europe in support of the British Army. As publicity, she was given the name Longmoor. The nameplate reads:

The 1000th
British built freight locomotive
ferried to Europe since 'D' Day
Locomotive No. 73755 Wed 9 May 1945
Longmoor

On arrival however, 73755 along with several other WD locomotives, was deemed temporarily surplus to requirements and stored at Calais.

After the war, No. 73755 was one of the ex-WD locomotives sold to Nederlandse Spoorwegen (NS; Dutch Railways). She was taken into NS stock as part of NS Class 5000II, and given the NS No. 5085. She was withdrawn in 1952 and set aside for preservation. She is currently in the Nederlands Spoorwegmuseum (Dutch Railway Museum) in Utrecht.
