= WD Austerity 2-10-0 =

British heavy freight steam locomotive class

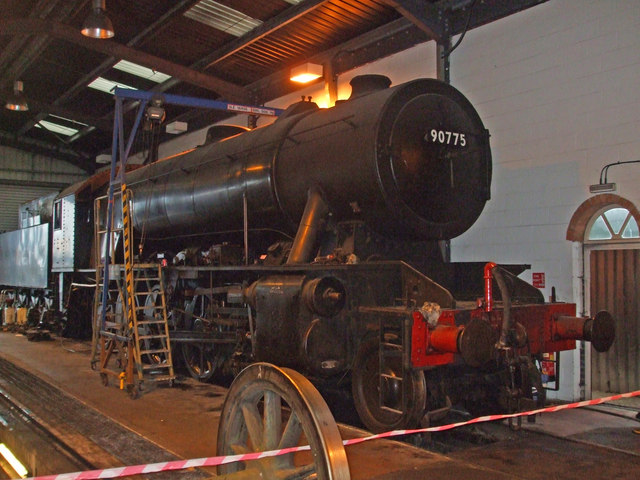
- 90775 on the North Norfolk Railway
Type and origin
- Power type: Steam
- Designer: R. A. Riddles
- Builder: North British Locomotive Company
- Serial number: 25436–25535, 25596–25645
- Build date: 1943–1945
- Total produced: 150
Specifications
- Configuration
  - Whyte: 2-10-0
  - UIC: 1′E h2
- Gauge: 4 ft 8 1/2 in (1,435 mm) standard gauge
- Leading dia.: 2 ft 9 in (838 mm)
- Driver dia.: 4 ft 8 1/2 in (1,435 mm)
- Length: 67 ft 6 1/4 in (20.58 m) over buffers
- Axle load: 13 long tons 9 cwt (30,100 lb or 13.7 t)
- Adhesive weight: 67 long tons 3 cwt (150,400 lb or 68.2 t) full
- Loco weight: 78 long tons 6 cwt (175,400 lb or 79.6 t) full
- Tender weight: 55 long tons 10 cwt (124,300 lb or 56.4 t) full
- Fuel type: Coal
- Fuel capacity: 9 long tons 0 cwt (20,200 lb or 9.1 t)
- Water cap.: 5,000 imp gal (23,000 L; 6,000 US gal)
- Firebox
  - Grate area: 40 sq ft (3.7 m^{2})
- Boiler pressure: 225 lbf/in^{2} (1.55 MPa)
- Heating surface
  - Firebox: 192 sq ft (17.8 m^{2})
  - Tubes: 1,170 sq ft (109 m^{2})
  - Flues: 589 sq ft (54.7 m^{2})
- Superheater
  - Heating area: 423 sq ft (39.3 m^{2})
- Cylinders: Two, outside
- Cylinder size: 19 in × 28 in (483 mm × 711 mm)
- Valve gear: Walschaerts
- Valve type: 10-inch (250 mm) piston valves
Performance figures
- Tractive effort: 34,215 lbf (152.20 kN)
Career
- Operators: WD » NS, BR, SEK, CFS
- Power class: BR: 8F
- Disposition: Eight total preserved or extant (Three in the UK, four in Greece, and one in the Netherlands) remainder scrapped

The War Department (WD) "Austerity" 2-10-0 is a type of heavy freight steam locomotive that was introduced during the Second World War in 1943.

== Background ==
The Austerity 2-10-0 was based on Robert Riddles' Austerity 2-8-0, and was designed to have interchangeable parts. It had the same power output as the 2-8-0 but a lighter axle load, making it suitable for secondary lines.

== Design ==
It had a parallel boiler and round-topped firebox. While the 2-8-0 had a narrow firebox, the 2-10-0 had a wide firebox placed above the driving wheels. This was common in the United States (e.g. the USRA 0-8-0) but unusual in Britain, where wide fireboxes usually used required trailing wheels, as with 4-4-2 and 4-6-2 types. These were the first 2-10-0 locomotives used in Great Britain, and the first major class of ten-coupled engines — they had been preceded by two 0-10-0 locomotives; the Great Eastern Railway's Decapod and the Midland Railway's Lickey Banker. Riddles later used the 2-10-0 wheel arrangement for the BR Standard Class 9F. This too had a wide firebox placed above the driving wheels.

== Construction ==
Two batches were built by the North British Locomotive Company, the first batch of 100 introduced in 1943/1944 and the second batch of 50 in 1945. Their WD Nos were 3650–3749 (later 73650–73749), and 73750–73799.

20 of the first batch were sent to the Middle East. During running-in they worked in Britain, but their length made them unsuitable. Most saw service with the British Army in France after D-Day in the drive towards the Siegfried Line.

== Post-war service ==
After the war the 150 locomotives were distributed as follows, the majority going to the Netherlands:

No. of engines	Country	Company	Class
103	Netherlands	Nederlandse Spoorwegen (NS)	NS 5000 class
25	Great Britain	British Railways (BR)	BR ex-WD Austerity 2-10-0
16	Greece	Hellenic State Railways (SEK)	SEK Class Λβ
4	Syria	Syrian Railways (CFS)	CFS Class 150.6
2	Great Britain	War Department, Longmoor (WD)	WD Austerity 2-10-0

=== Netherlands ===
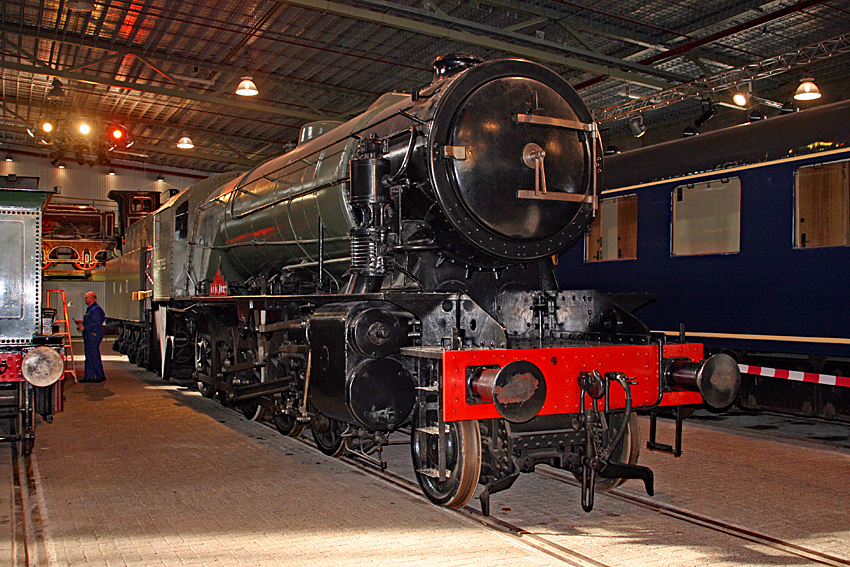
WD 2-10-0 73755 Longmoor at Utrecht

In 1946, the Netherlands bought those in continental Europe. They formed the NS 5000 class, and were numbered 5001–103. They had a short working life, the last being withdrawn in 1952. 5085, ex WD 73755, the one-thousandth British built locomotive to be shipped to Europe after D-Day, was named Longmoor and subsequently preserved in the Utrecht railway museum.

=== British Railways ===
After the war, the British Railways (BR) bought twenty-five locomotives. These were initially numbered 73774-73798 but later re-numbered 90750–74. They were mostly operated by BR's Scottish Region on heavy freight trains and were all withdrawn between 1961 and 1962.

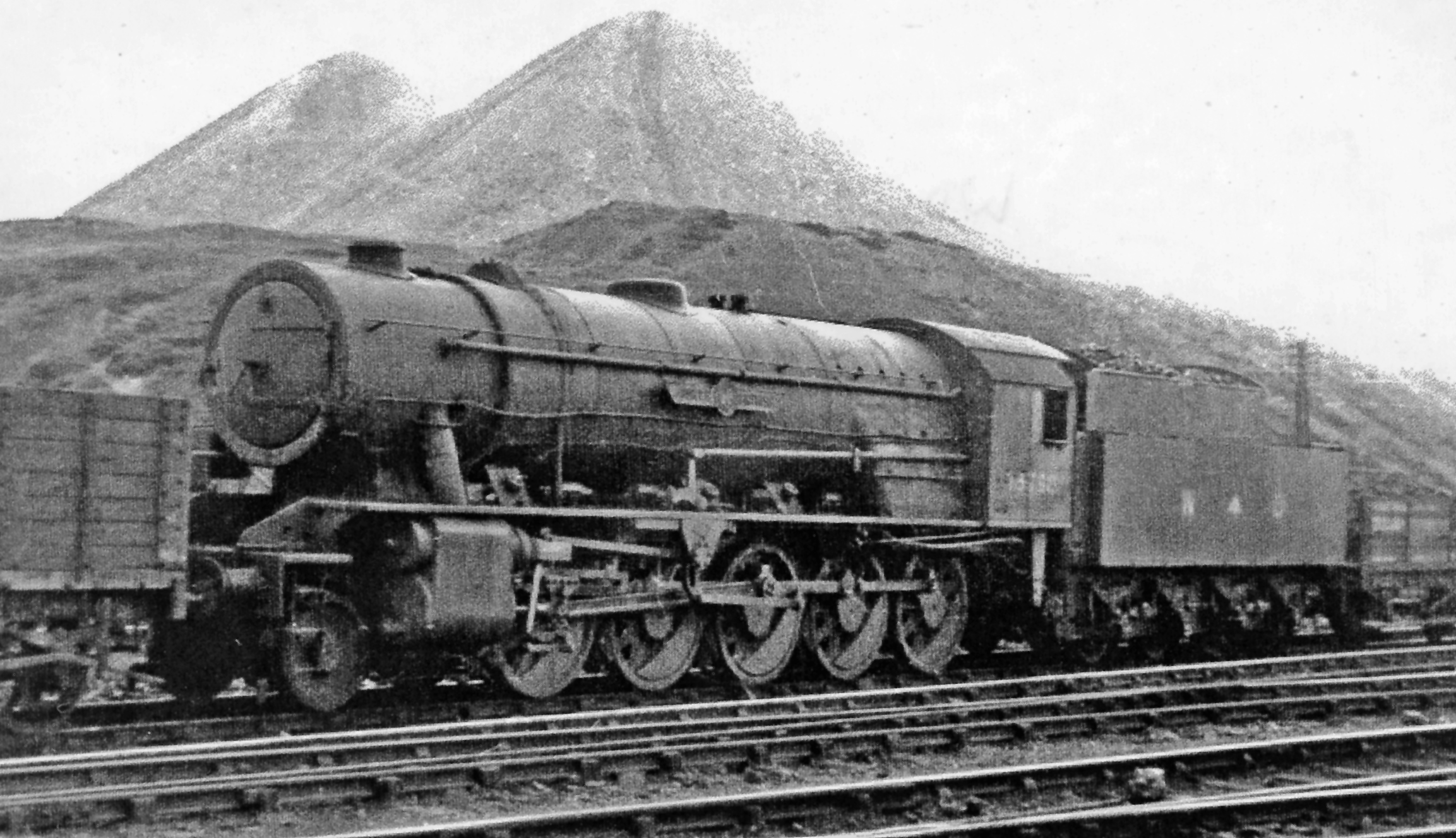
ex-WD 2-10-0 No. 73798 'North British' stands at Motherwell Depot in 1948

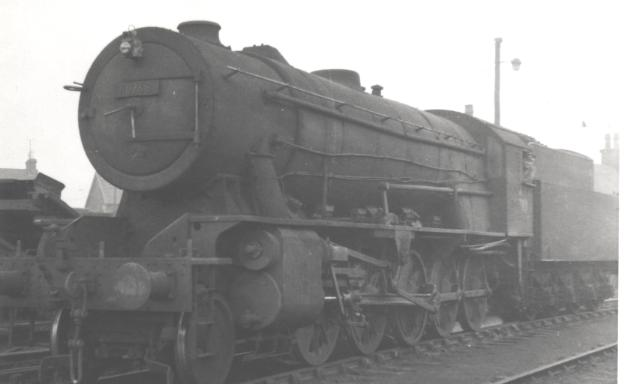
BR Scottish Region WD 2-10-0 90768 at Motherwell motive power depot in 1958

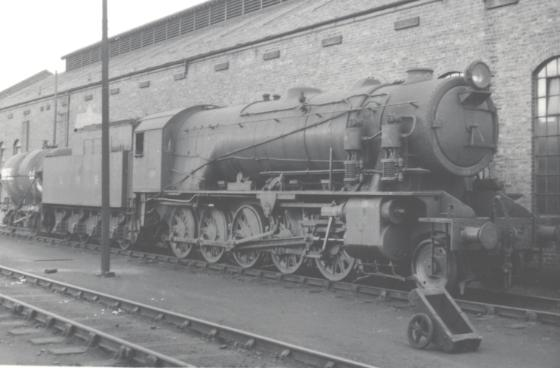
WD 2-10-0 WD 601 "Kitchener" at Carlisle Kingmoor BR shed in 1958. Note air pumps, headlight and nameplate

=== Greece ===
Sixteen of the twenty Middle East locomotives went to Greece, where they formed Class Λβ of the Hellenic State Railways, numbered Λβ951 to Λβ966.

=== Syria ===
The remaining 4 Middle East locomotives remained in Syria and operated on the Syrian Railways (CFS). These engines formed the CFS Class 150.6.

== Further WD services ==
In the 1952 WD renumbering scheme, the two remaining in WD service (at the Longmoor Military Railway), Nos. 73651 and 73797, were renumbered 600 and 601 respectively. The also received names: 600 Gordon and 601 Kitchener.

== Preservation ==
LMR 600 Gordon has survived and has been steamed on the Severn Valley Railway, though as of 2022 it is out of service, cosmetically restored and on display in the Engine House.

Two more have been repatriated from Greece. One has been numbered 90775, one higher than the last BR engine, and has carried the name Sturdee (Note: after Doveton Sturdee) (as WD/LMR No. 601 before being numbered 90775) and is operational on North Norfolk Railway where it has now been renamed The Royal Norfolk Regiment as of 2022. The other is WD No. (7)3672 which has been named Dame Vera Lynn. The loco is currently being overhaul at Grosmont on the NYMR.

The fourth one in preservation WD 73755 (NS 5085) survives in the Dutch Railway Museum (Nederlands Spoorwegmuseum) in Utrecht. It carries the nameplate Longmoor, after the Royal Engineers base at Longmoor, with the coat of arms of the Royal Engineers above.

Four locomotives remain in various states in Greece with Λβ962 and Λβ964 operating mainline tours on the Drama to Xanthi line. Other locomotives remain in poor states stored awaiting further use.

Numbers					Name	Location	Status
WD	NS	SEK	BR	LMR	Name	Location	Status
(7)3651	—	—	—	600	Gordon	Severn Valley Railway, England	Static Display in the Engine House
(7)3652	—	Λβ951	90775 (Note: Name or number applied after preservation)	—	The Royal Norfolk Regiment	North Norfolk Railway, Norfolk, England	Operational
(7)3656	—	Λβ955	—	—	—	Thessaloniki, Greece.	Dumped
(7)3672	—	Λβ960	—	—	Dame Vera Lynn	North Yorkshire Moors Railway, Yorkshire, England.	Undergoing Overhaul, being converted to run on oil.
(7)3677	—	Λβ962	—	—	—	Drama, Greece	Stored. Was operational on the Drama to Xanthi line in Greece.
(7)3682	—	Λβ964	—	—	—	Thessaloniki Depot, Greece	Stored, was operational on the Drama to Xanthi line in Greece, and used for static filming in 2015.
(7)3659	—	Λβ958	—	—	—	Tithorea, Greece.	Stored derelict
73755	5085	—	—	—	Longmoor	Nederlands Spoorwegmuseum, Utrecht, Netherlands	Static Display

Of the eight surviving members of the class, three have run on the main line: nos. 600 Gordon, 73677 & 73682. Gordon appeared at the Rail 150 celebrations in August 1975 and traveled to Shildon and later returned to the SVR under its own steam, in 1980 it travelled under its own power to Bold Colliery to take part in the locomotive parade at Rocket 150 in Rainhill. Due to the class's flangeless centre driving wheels, there is a concern that the raised check rails on modern pointwork might cause a derailment, so the class (alongside other 2-10-0 locomotives) are presently prohibited from operating on the mainline in Great Britain.

73677 and 73682 have both worked on the national network in Greece, but neither are presently operational.

== See also ==
- BR ex-WD Austerity 2-10-0 - locomotives taken into LNER/BR ownership
- WD Austerity 2-8-0 - locomotives of similar design
