= SEK Class Λβ =

Anglo-Hellenic steam locomotive class

SEK Class Λβ (WD Austerity 2-10-0)
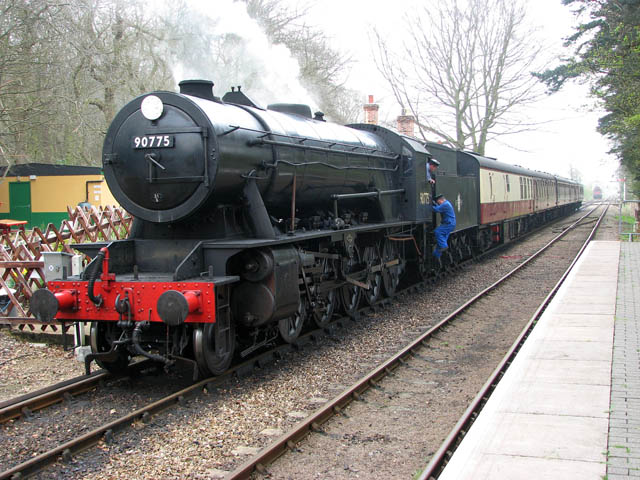
- Former Λβ951 preserved as 90775 on the North Norfolk Railway.
Type and origin
- Power type: Steam
- Designer: Riddles
- Builder: North British Locomotive Company
- Build date: 1943-1944
- Total produced: 16
Specifications
- Configuration
  - Whyte: 2-10-0
  - UIC: 1′E h
- Gauge: 4 ft 8 1/2 in (1,435 mm)
- Driver dia.: 4 ft 8 1/2 in (1,435 mm)
- Loco weight: 78 long tons 6 cwt (175,400 lb or 79.6 t)
- Fuel type: Coal
- Boiler pressure: 225 lbf/in^{2} (1.55 MPa)
- Cylinders: Two
- Cylinder size: 19 in × 28 in (483 mm × 711 mm)
Performance figures
- Tractive effort: 34,215 lbf (152.20 kN)
Career
- Withdrawn: 1975-1985

SEK (Sidirodromoi Ellinikou Kratous, Hellenic State Railways) Class Λβ (or Class Lb; Lambda-beta) is a class of 16 2-10-0 steam locomotives, ex-WD Austerity 2-10-0s purchased after the Second World War. All of them were previously stabled in Egypt and were transported to Greece, as part of the UNRRA mission in Greece (arrived at Thessaloniki port on 16 January 1946). They were given the class letters "Λβ" and numbers 951–966.

They were mainly allocated to the Salonika division, but hauled both freight and passenger trains (including Athens to Istanbul Expresses) all across Greece, until they were slowly replaced by diesel locomotives until the mid-1970s, being one of the last classes of steam locomotives of SEK to be withdrawn from regular service.

== Preservation ==
A total of six Greek Austerity 2-10-0s survived the 1984-1985 steam locomotive scrappings, two of which were repatriated to Great Britain. Two continued to work tourist specials out of Drama until the mid-00s whilst the remaining two were left in open storage thereby leaving just four survivors in Greece and the two repatriated examples.

Numbers			Name	Location	Image
WD	SEK	BR	Name	Location	Image
(7)3652	Λβ951	90775*	The Royal Norfolk Regiment* (formerly known as Sturdee)	Operational, North Norfolk Railway, Norfolk, England	
(7)3653	Λβ952	—	—	Scrapped 1984–85 at Thessaloniki.	
(7)3654	Λβ953	—	—	Scrapped 1984–85 at Thessaloniki.	
(7)3655	Λβ954	—	—	Scrapped 1984–85 at Tithorea	
(7)3656	Λβ955	—	—	Dumped, Thessaloniki old depot, Greece.	
(7)3657	Λβ956	—	—	Scrapped 1984–85 at Tithorea.	
(7)3658	Λβ957	—	—	Scrapped 1984–85 at Tithorea.	
(7)3659	Λβ958	—	—	Stored derelict at Tithorea, Greece.	
(7)3660	Λβ959	—	—	Scrapped 1984–85 at Thessaloniki.	
(7)3672	Λβ960	—	Dame Vera Lynn*	Awaiting overhaul at Grosmont North Yorkshire Moors Railway, Yorkshire, England	
(7)3674	Λβ961	—	—	Scrapped 1984-85 at Rentis Depot, Athens.	
(7)3677	Λβ962	—	—	Stored Drama. Was operational on the Drama to Xanthi line hauling tourist specials until mid 2000s.	
(7)3678	Λβ963	—	—	Scrapped 1984–85 at Thessaloniki.	
(7)3682	Λβ964	—	—	Stored in Thessaloniki depot. Was operational on the Drama to Xanthi line hauling tourist specials until mid 2000s.	
(7)3683	Λβ965	—	—	Scrapped 1984–85 at Tithorea.	
(7)3684	Λβ966	—	—	Scrapped 1984-85 at Thessaloniki.	

* Name or number applied after preservation
