= LMR 600 Gordon =

Preserved 2-10-0 steam locomotive

600 Gordon
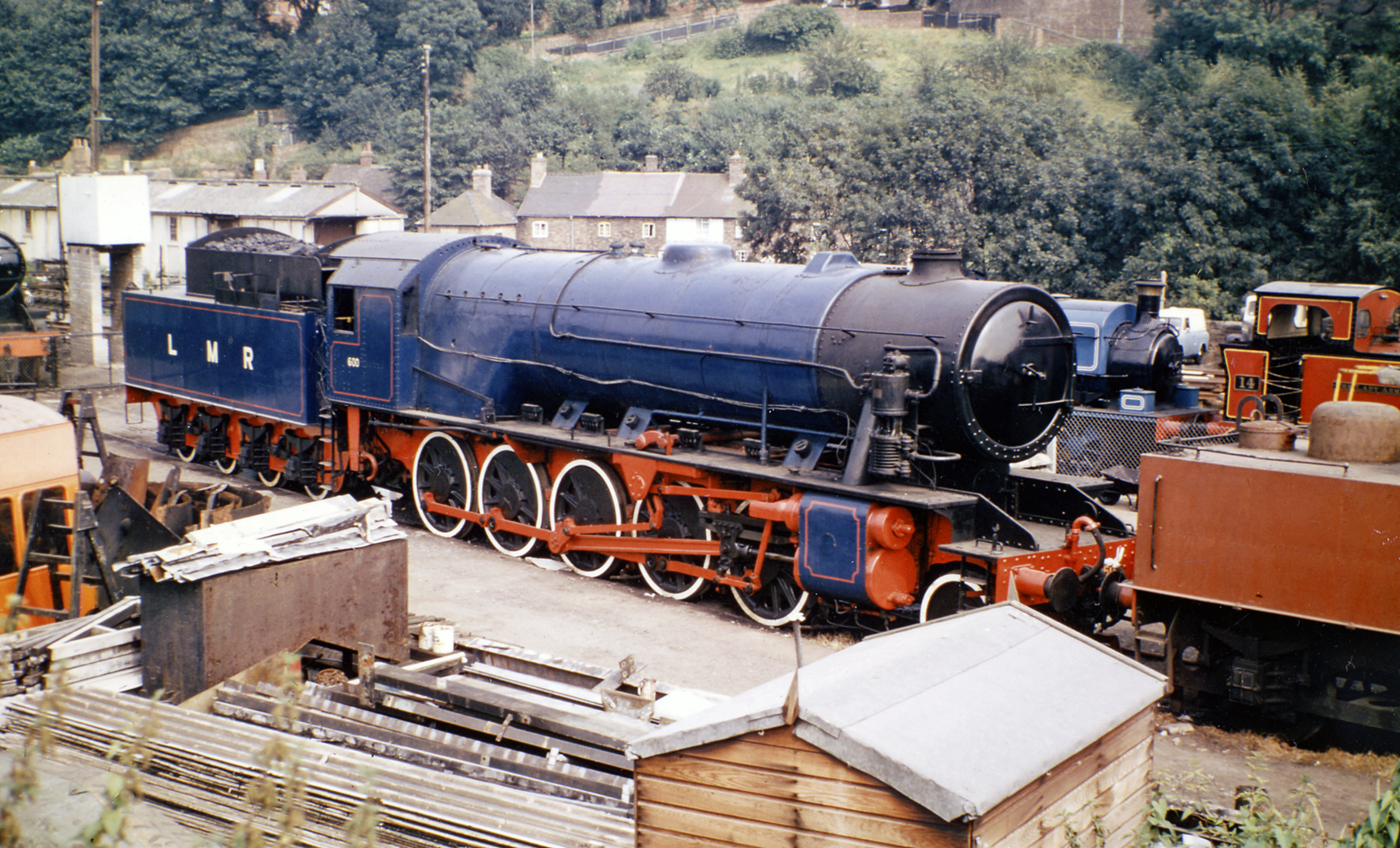
- Gordon on the Severn Valley Railway, 1972
Type and origin
- Power type: Steam
- Builder: North British Locomotive Company
- Serial number: 25437
- Model: WD Austerity 2-10-0
- Build date: 1943
Specifications
- Configuration
  - Whyte: 2-10-0
  - UIC: 1′E h2
- Leading dia.: 2 ft 9 in (0.838 m)
- Driver dia.: 4 ft 8 1/2 in (1.435 m)
- Fuel type: Coal
- Fuel capacity: 9 long tons (9.1 t)
- Water cap.: 5,000 imperial gallons (23,000 L; 6,000 US gal)
- Boiler pressure: 225 lbf/in^{2} (1.55 MPa)
Career
- Operators: War Department; British Army
- Numbers: War Department 3651 → 73651; British Army: 600
- Withdrawn: 1969
- Restored: 1972
- Current owner: Severn Valley Railway
- Disposition: On display at The Engine House

600 Gordon is a preserved British steam locomotive. It was built during World War II to the War Department's Austerity 2-10-0 design and was the last steam locomotive owned by the British Army. It had the same power output as the Austerity 2-8-0 but a lighter axle load, making it suitable for secondary lines. The middle driving wheels of the class have no flange, to ease turning on tighter tracks.

== Service ==
Gordon was the second of 150 2-10-0 locomotives built for the War Department by the North British Locomotive Company at its Hyde Park Works in Glasgow. It entered service in December 1943 as No. 3651, shortly afterward becoming No. 73651 when the instruction was given during 1944 to increase WD numbers by 70,000. Although most of the first batch of 100 saw service overseas, Gordon remained in the UK throughout the war.

After the war, the locomotive was used by the Royal Engineers on the Longmoor Military Railway (LMR) in Hampshire. It was renumbered 600 in 1952 and given the name Gordon in honour of Royal Engineers' General, Charles Gordon.

While at the LMR, Gordon was used both on general duties and for instructional use. During the Suez Crisis in 1956, it was reputed to have worked secret nightly trains carrying government materials between Longmoor and Southampton Docks.

By the 1960s, Gordon was the last steam locomotive still in use at the LMR and had become a popular attraction at enthusiasts' specials, including working on the Portsmouth Direct Line between Woking and Liss on 30 April 1966.

== Preservation ==
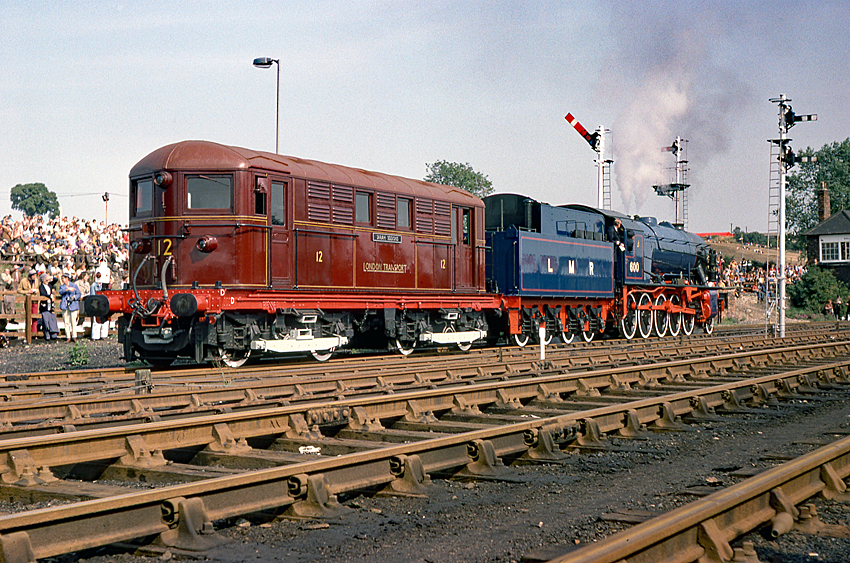
Gordon hauling LT 12 Sarah Siddons in the Shildon cavalcade

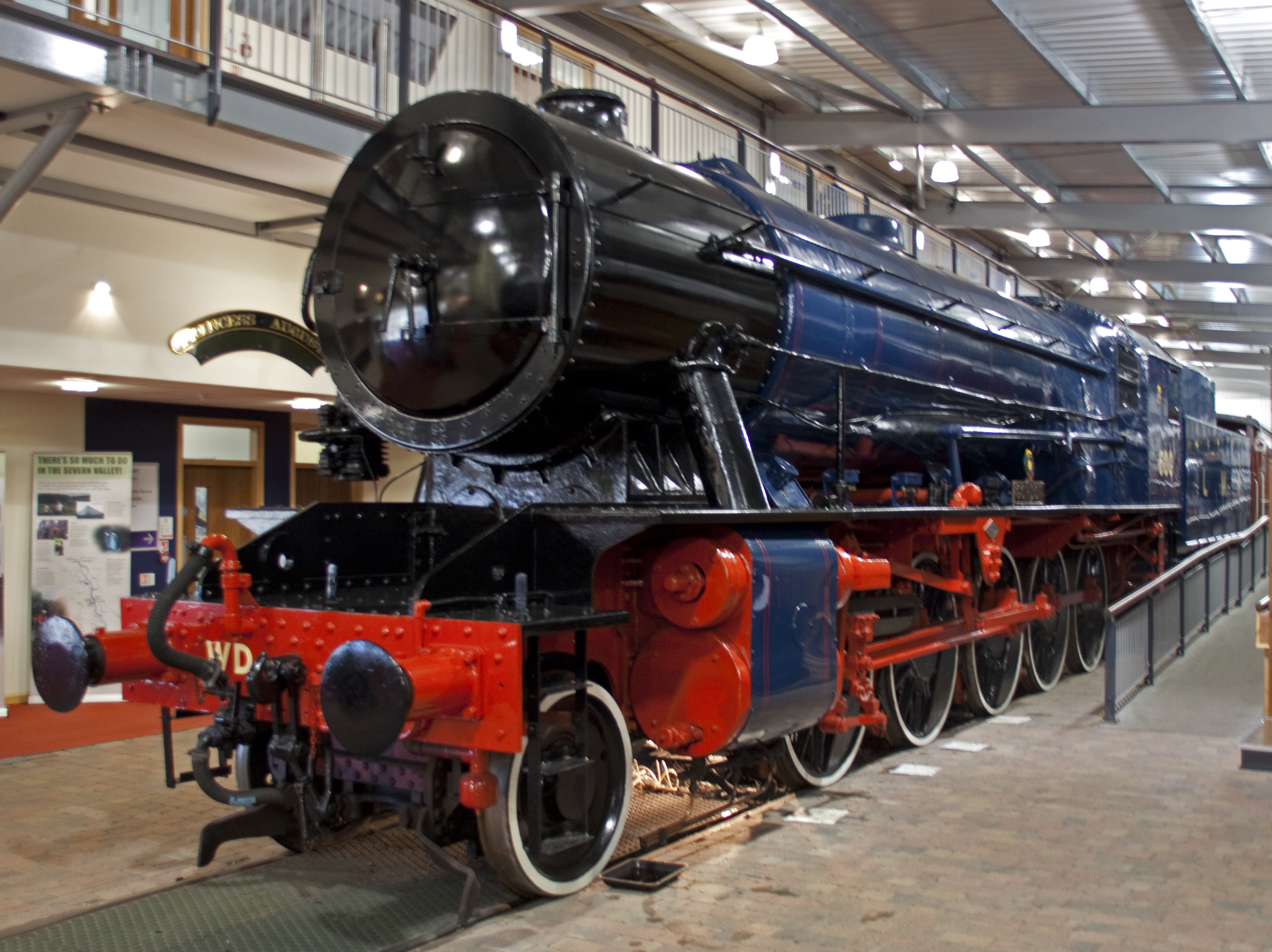
Gordon as stored in The Engine House on the Severn Valley Railway

When the LMR closed in October 1969, Gordon was offered a home on the Severn Valley Railway, arriving there in 1972 and operating from 29 July of that year. In July 1975, it took part in the Stockton and Darlington 150 celebrations at Shildon, being steamed in the cavalcade. In May 1980, it took part in the Locomotive Parade at Rocket 150, the 150th anniversary of the opening of the Liverpool & Manchester Railway at Rainhill. Gordon also served as Gordon the Big Engine from Thomas the Tank Engine & Friends as part of SVR's former Day Out with Thomas events.

Gordon was withdrawn from service in 1999 after a boiler tube blew. The engine was deemed not cost-effective to repair at that time. After being stored outside for many years, it was given a cosmetic repaint and was one of the first locomotives placed in The Engine House museum adjoining Highley station in March 2008. On 25 July 2008, the locomotive was formally handed over by the British Army to the Severn Valley Railway, who had been looking after it in a caretaker capacity. As of 2025, it remains on static display.
