= USRA 0-8-0 =

Class of American two-cylinder 0-8-0 locomotives

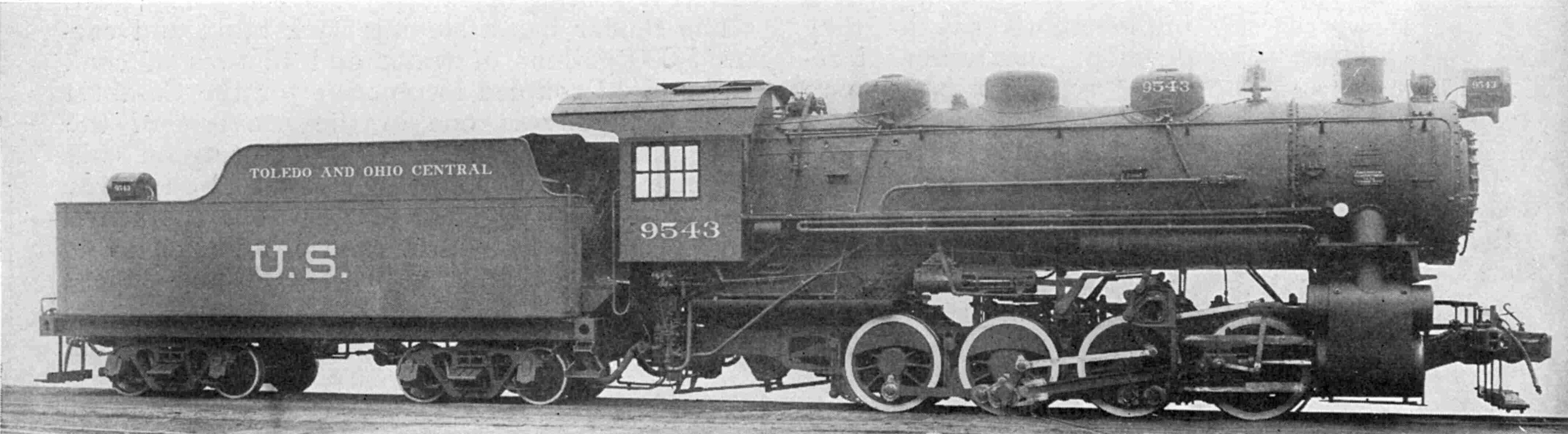
Type and origin
- Power type: Steam
- Builder: ALCO, Baldwin, Lima
- Total produced: 175 (plus 1,200 copies)
Specifications
- Configuration
  - Whyte: 0-8-0
  - UIC: D h2
- Gauge: 4 ft 8 1/2 in (1,435 mm) standard gauge
- Driver dia.: 51 in (1,295 mm)
- Wheelbase: Locomotive: 15 ft 0 in (4.57 m); Loco & tender: 52 ft 10 1/2 in (16.12 m)
- Length: 66 ft 1 1/2 in (20.15 m)
- Width: 10 ft 0 in (3.05 m)
- Height: 15 ft 0 in (4.57 m)
- Axle load: 55,000 lb (25,000 kg)
- Loco weight: 220,000 lb (100,000 kg)
- Tender weight: 144,000 lb (65,000 kg)
- Total weight: 364,000 lb (165,000 kg)
- Fuel type: Coal
- Fuel capacity: 32,000 lb (15,000 kg)
- Water cap.: 8,000 US gal (30,000 L; 6,700 imp gal)
- Firebox
  - Grate area: 46.6 sq ft (4.33 m^{2})
- Boiler pressure: 175 psi (1.21 MPa)
- Heating surface
  - Firebox: 190 sq ft (18 m^{2})
  - Tubes: 1,796 sq ft (166.9 m^{2})
  - Flues: 773 sq ft (71.8 m^{2})
  - Total surface: 2,781 sq ft (258.4 m^{2})
- Superheater
  - Heating area: 637 sq ft (59.2 m^{2})
- Cylinders: Two, outside
- Cylinder size: 25 in × 28 in (635 mm × 711 mm)
- Valve gear: Baker
- Valve type: 14-inch (360 mm) piston valves
Performance figures
- Tractive effort: 51,042 lbf (227.05 kN)

The USRA 0-8-0 was a USRA standard class of steam locomotive designed under the control of the United States Railroad Administration, the nationalized railroad system in the United States during World War I. This was the standard heavy switcher locomotive of the USRA types, and had an 0-8-0 wheel arrangement in the Whyte notation, or "D" in UIC classification.

A total of 175 locomotives were built under USRA control; these were sent to the following railroads:

Table of original USRA allocation
Railroad	Quantity	Class	Road numbers	Notes
Chicago, Burlington and Quincy Railroad	10	F-1	540–549	
Elgin, Joliet and Eastern Railway	8		329-336	
Erie Railroad	16	C-1	120–135	
Kansas City Terminal Railway	5		34-38	
Louisville and Nashville Railroad	6	C-2	2118–2123	
Missouri-Kansas-Texas Railroad	10		39-48	
Northern Pacific Railway	4	G-1	1170–1173	
New York Central Railroad	25	U-3a	415–439	Renumbered 7815–7839
NYC subsidiary Cleveland, Cincinnati, Chicago and St. Louis Railway	9	U-3a	7440–7448	Renumbered 7740–7748
NYC subsidiary Indiana Harbor Belt Railroad	20	U-3a	300–319	
NYC subsidiary Kanawha and Michigan Railroad	3	U-3a	553, 554, 568	Renumbered 9548-9550, then 7758–7760
NYC subsidiary Lake Erie and Western Railroad	3	U-3a	4250–4252	to New York, Chicago and St. Louis Railroad ("Nickel Plate Road") 205–207 in 1923
NYC subsidiary Michigan Central Railroad	10	U-3a	8940–8949	Renumbered 7840–7849
NYC subsidiary Toledo and Ohio Central Railroad	5	U-3a	9543–9547	Renumbered 7753–7757
New York, New Haven and Hartford Railroad	35	Y-3	Ten were built in 1920 (3400-3409), twenty in 1922 initially lettered CNE 13-32 (3415-3434), and five in 1923 (3410-3414).	
Pere Marquette Railway	10		1300–1309	to Chesapeake and Ohio Railway 40–49
Rutland Railroad	2	U-3	109–110	
Southern Railway	20	As-11	1878-1897	
West Point Route (Atlanta and West Point Rail Road)	1	G	215	
West Point Route (Georgia Railroad)	2	G	801–802	
West Point Route (Western Railway of Alabama)	1	G	115	
Wheeling and Lake Erie Railway	5	C-1	5101–5105	to New York, Chicago and St. Louis Railroad ("Nickel Plate Road") 271–275 in 1949
Total	175			

After the dissolution of the USRA, an additional 1,200 copies of the USRA 0-8-0 were built for many railroads, There is a known survivor of this Type, Republic Steel Corp. #285, which is an ALCO (Richmond) product built in 1925. It is now preserved at the Kentucky Railway Museum in New Haven, Kentucky. Another USRA Copy, Illinois Central #3525, Shortly operated on the Stone Mountain Scenic Railroad and given the name "Big Dixie" before being sold to the North Carolina Transportation Museum. The locomotive would be repainted into a Southern Railway inspired livery, before being traded for an actual Southern Railway locomotive #542. #3525 is now on static display at Tanglewood Park, Clemmons, North Carolina.
