= SR Merchant Navy Class 35018 British India Line =

35018 British India Line
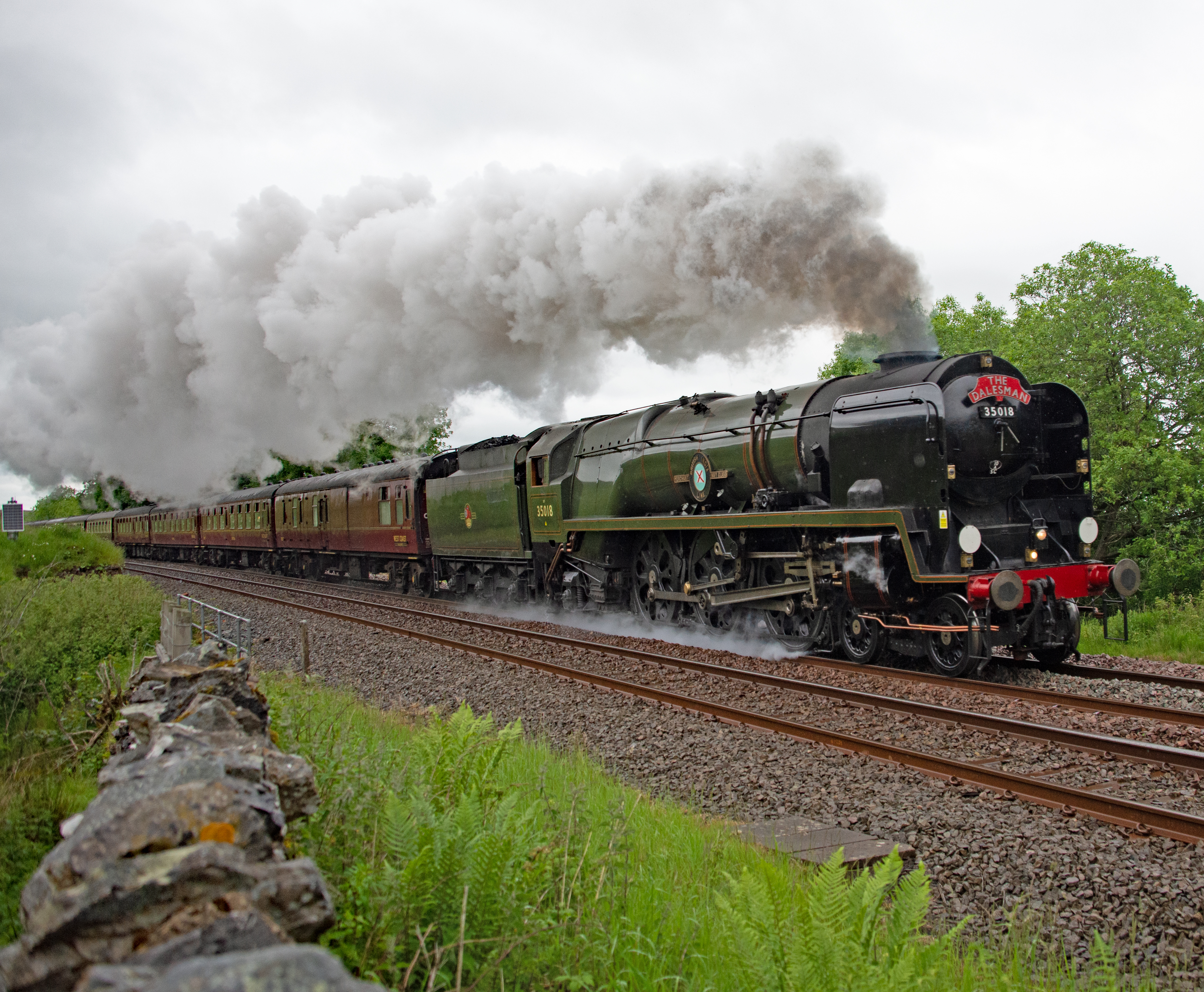
- 35018 Dalesman excursion heading to York from Carlisle at Fothergill Sike
Type and origin
- Power type: Steam
- Builder: Eastleigh Works
- Build date: May 1945
- Rebuild date: Feb 1956
Specifications
- Configuration
  - Whyte: 4-6-2
- Gauge: 4 ft 8 1/2 in (1,435 mm)
- Driver dia.: 6 ft 2 in (1.88 m)
- Wheelbase: 61 ft 6 in (18.75 m)
- Length: 71 ft 7¾ in (21.84 m)
- Total weight: 94 tons 15 cwt (96,270 kg, c. 212,240 lb)
- Boiler pressure: 280 psi (19.31 bar; 1.93 MPa), later reduced to 250 psi (17.24 bar; 1.72 MPa)
- Cylinders: 3
- Cylinder size: 18 in bore x 24 in stroke (457 x 610 mm)
- Loco brake: Vacuum
- Safety systems: AWS, TPWS, OTMR, GSM-R
Performance figures
- Tractive effort: 33,495 lbf (149.0 kN) (previously 37,515 lbf (166.9 kN))
Career
- Operators: British Railways
- Class: Merchant Navy
- Power class: SR: A; BR: 8P
- Numbers: SR 21C18; BR 35018
- Official name: British India Line
- Withdrawn: August 1964
- Restored: May 2017
- Current owner: David Smith
- Disposition: Operational, Mainline Certified

21C18 British India Line is a preserved SR Merchant Navy class steam locomotive built by the Southern Railway in 1945.

British India Line was one of the first batch of twenty completed at Eastleigh Works in May 1945, and in that month was first shedded at Nine Elms shed, where it was to remain for most of its career, under both the Southern Railway and British Railways. On 24 November 1960 it was briefly re-allocated to Bournemouth's 71B shed, but in January of the following year it returned to Nine Elms 70A shed.

21C18 was withdrawn from service in August 1964 and sold on to Woodham Brothers scrapyard in Barry, South Wales where it arrived in December of the same year. It was rescued from the scrapyard in November 1979, but work to restore the locomotive began only in 2012 and British India Line ran again under its own steam on the main line in May 2017.

== Allocations and history ==
When built in 1945 no 21C18 emerged in a streamlined condition with air-smoothed casing, all-welded firebox, a boiler pressure of 280psi, thermic siphons, chain-driven valve gear which was sealed in an oil bath, steam reverser and electric lighting for both front of engine and cab, using electricity from a steam-powered generator. Because of mechanical issues with the class, including an accident at Crewkerne in 1953 which involved 21C20 Bibby Line, it was decided to rebuild all 30 locomotives to a more conventional design. This included removing the air-smoothed casing and using instead conventional boiler cladding, reduction of boiler pressure to 250psi and replacement of the chain-driven valve gear with three sets of Walschaerts valve gear. The unique Bulleid Firth Brown wheels were retained, as well as other original parts which did work but the rebuilt engines would emerge in a completely different shape to their original form.

35018 was the first engine to be rebuilt and emerged from Eastleigh works in February 1956. Following the rebuilding of all the Merchant Navy class engines, the success of the modification programme influenced the design of the future modification of the smaller 'Light Pacifics'.

After being rebuilt, 21C18 remained in service for only eight more years until August 1964, when it was the fifth member of the class to be withdrawn. It was purchased by Barry Scrapyard for eventual disposal and arrived at Barry Island in March 1965.

== Preservation ==
It had been planned that the locomotive should work on its own from Carnforth to York and then to double head with 45699 Galatea on the return journey. However, 35018 was failed in York with mechanical problems and the tour was worked back to Carnforth by Galatea on its own.

On 23 February and 7 March 2018, 35018 went on loaded test runs but on the first test run the engine was failed at Hellifield and returned directly to Carnforth running tender first. The second test run went without any problems and the engine returned to full mainline service on 21 March 2018. Its first train was West Coast Railways' "Salopian Express 1" from Barrow to Shrewsbury with 35018 working the train from Carnforth to Shrewsbury.

On 19 March 2022, 35018 made its first trip to Edinburgh while working Railway Touring Company's "Edinburgh Flyer" from Preston to Edinburgh travelling along the West Coast Main Line via Shap and Beattock with 35018 working the train from Carnforth to Edinburgh in both directions.

== Photographic chronology ==
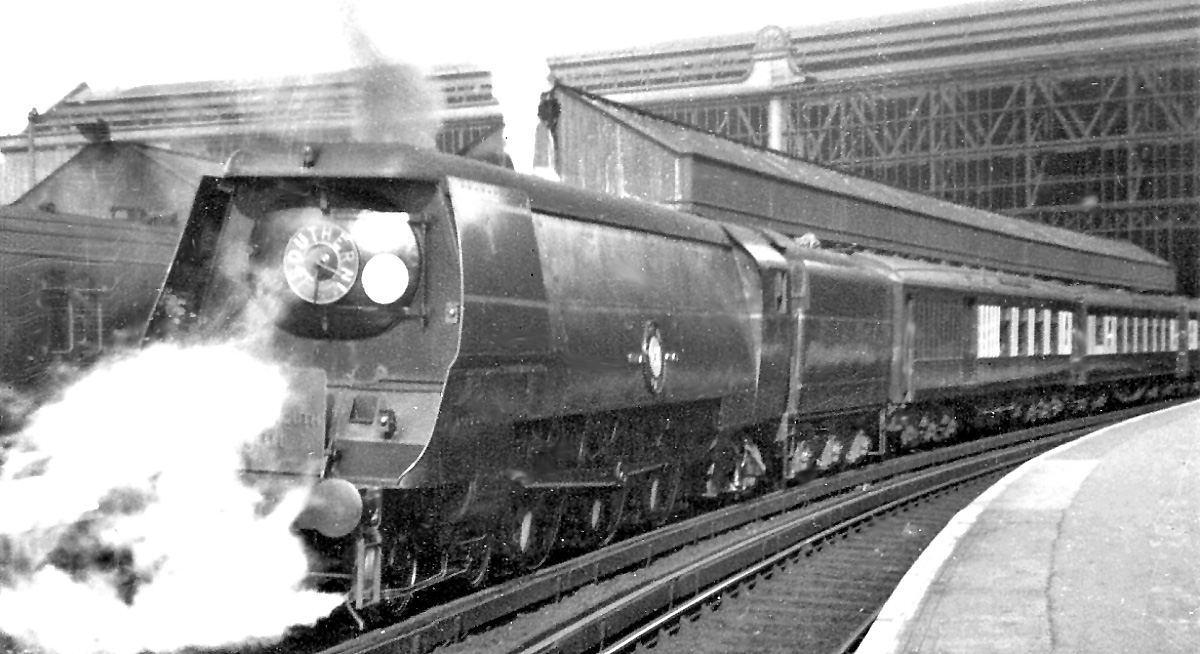
In original unrebuilt condition, waiting to depart Waterloo with "The Bournemouth Belle" in Oct 1946

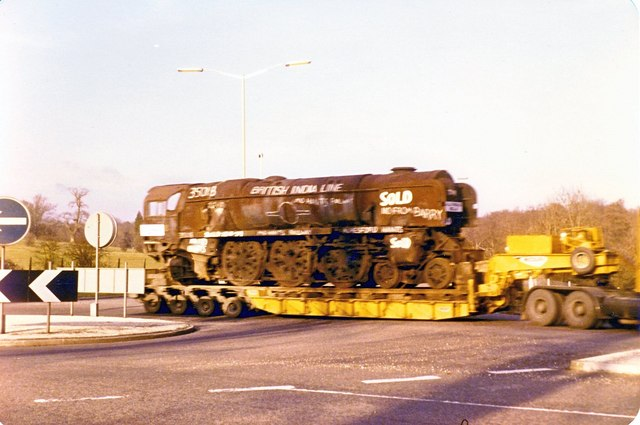
On the move from Barry Island in March 1980

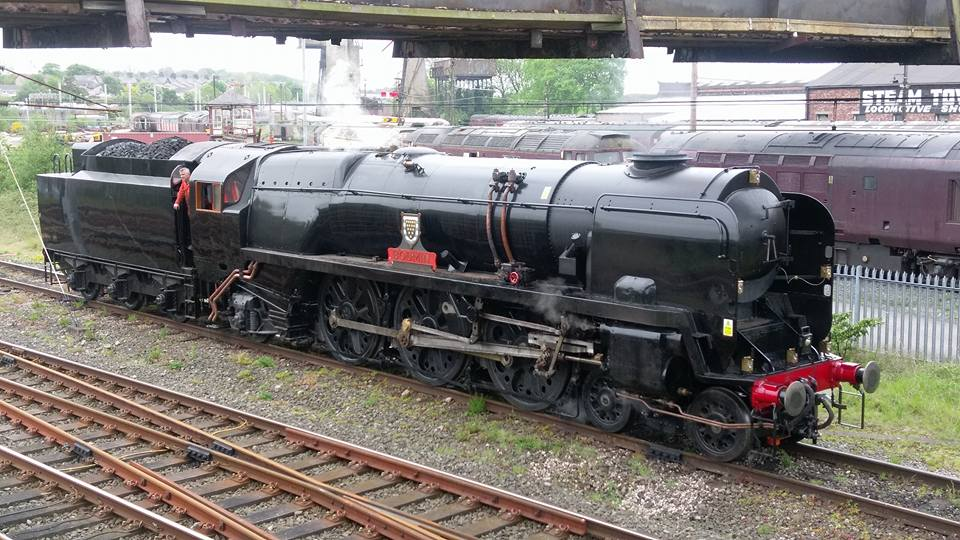
35018 in 2017 with Bodmin nameplates making its first moves on the mainline since 1964

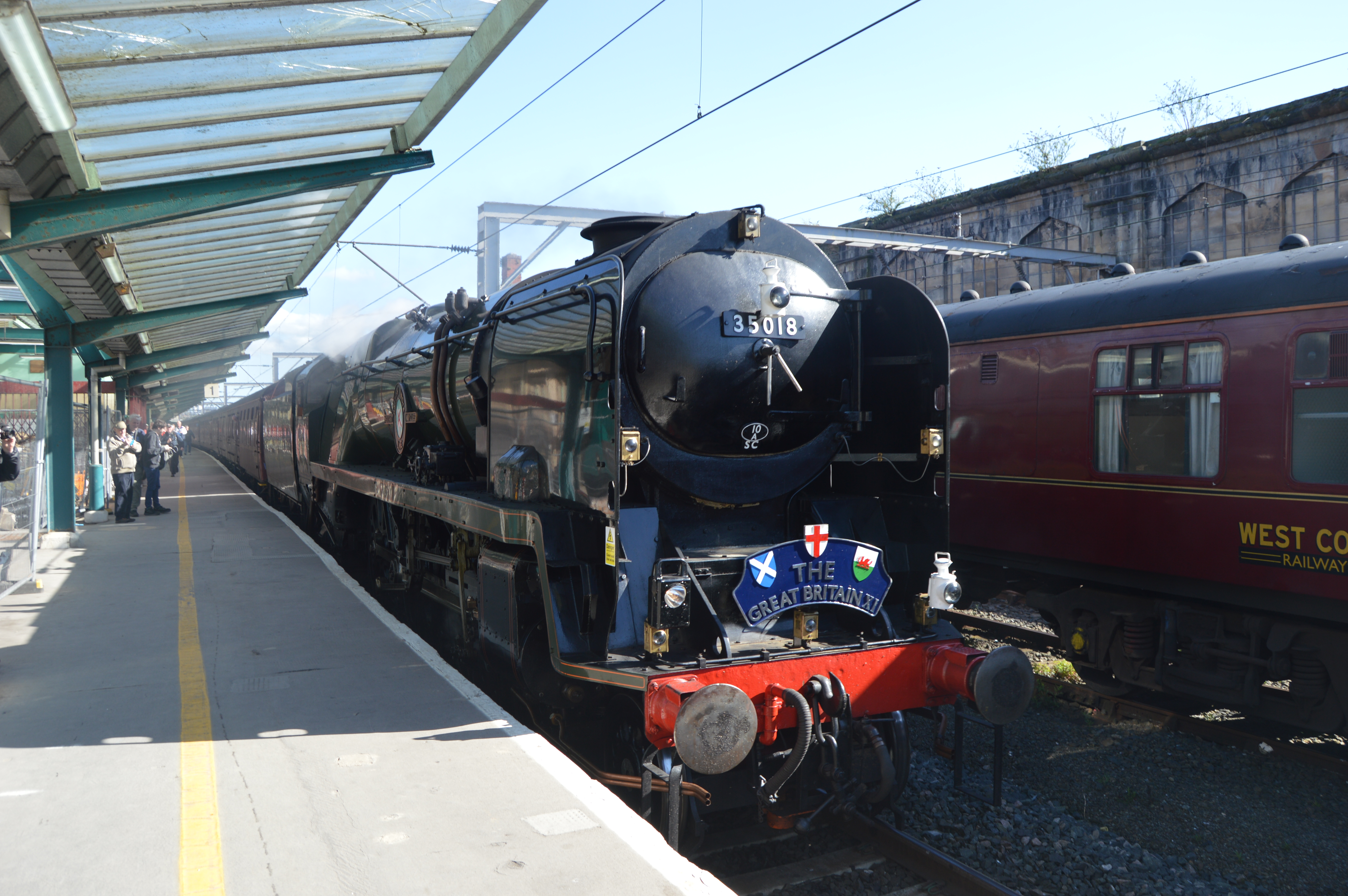
Arriving in Carlisle with the York to Carlisle leg of "The Great Britain XI" on Fri 20th April 2018.

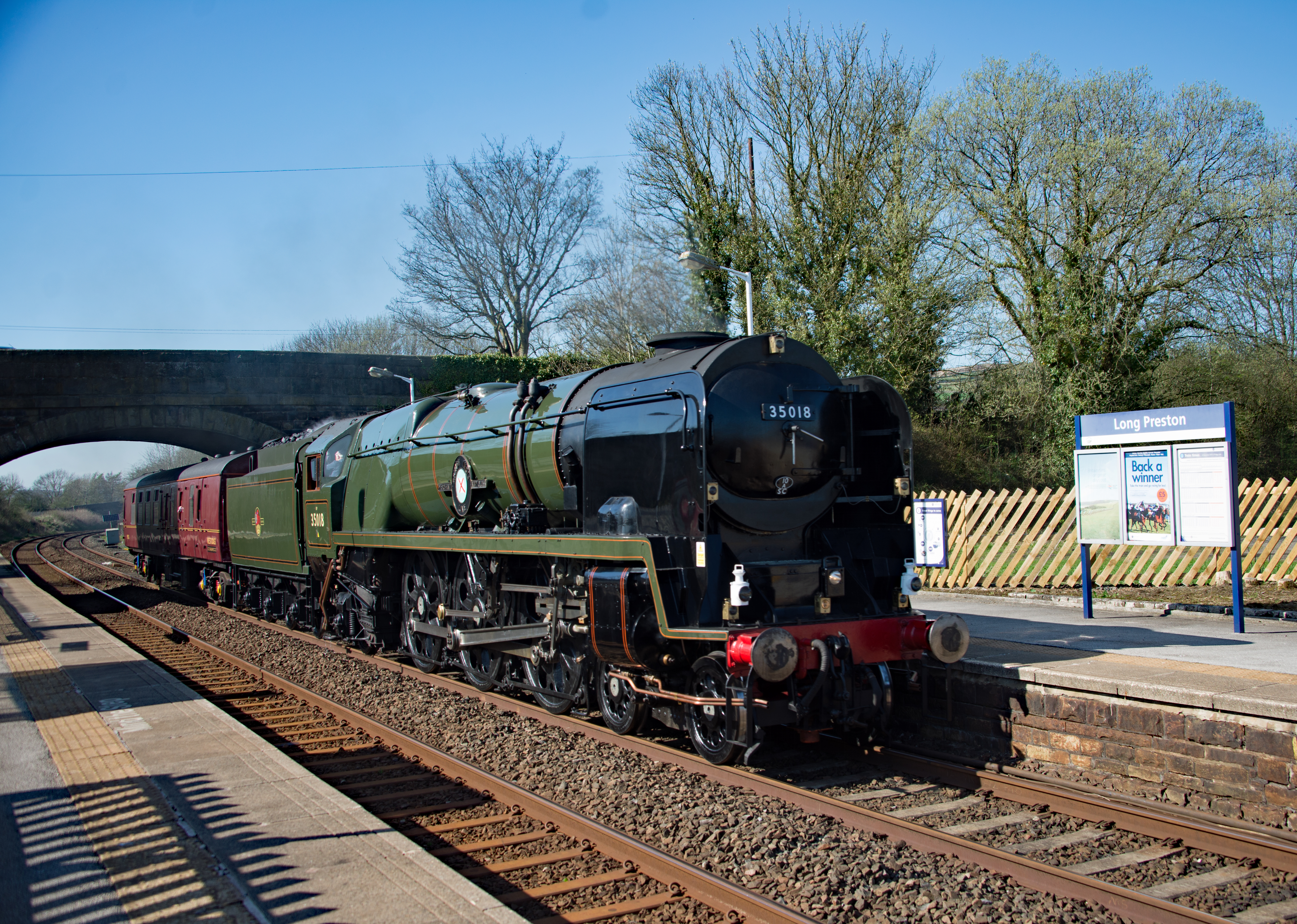
At Long Preston enroute to York April 2018

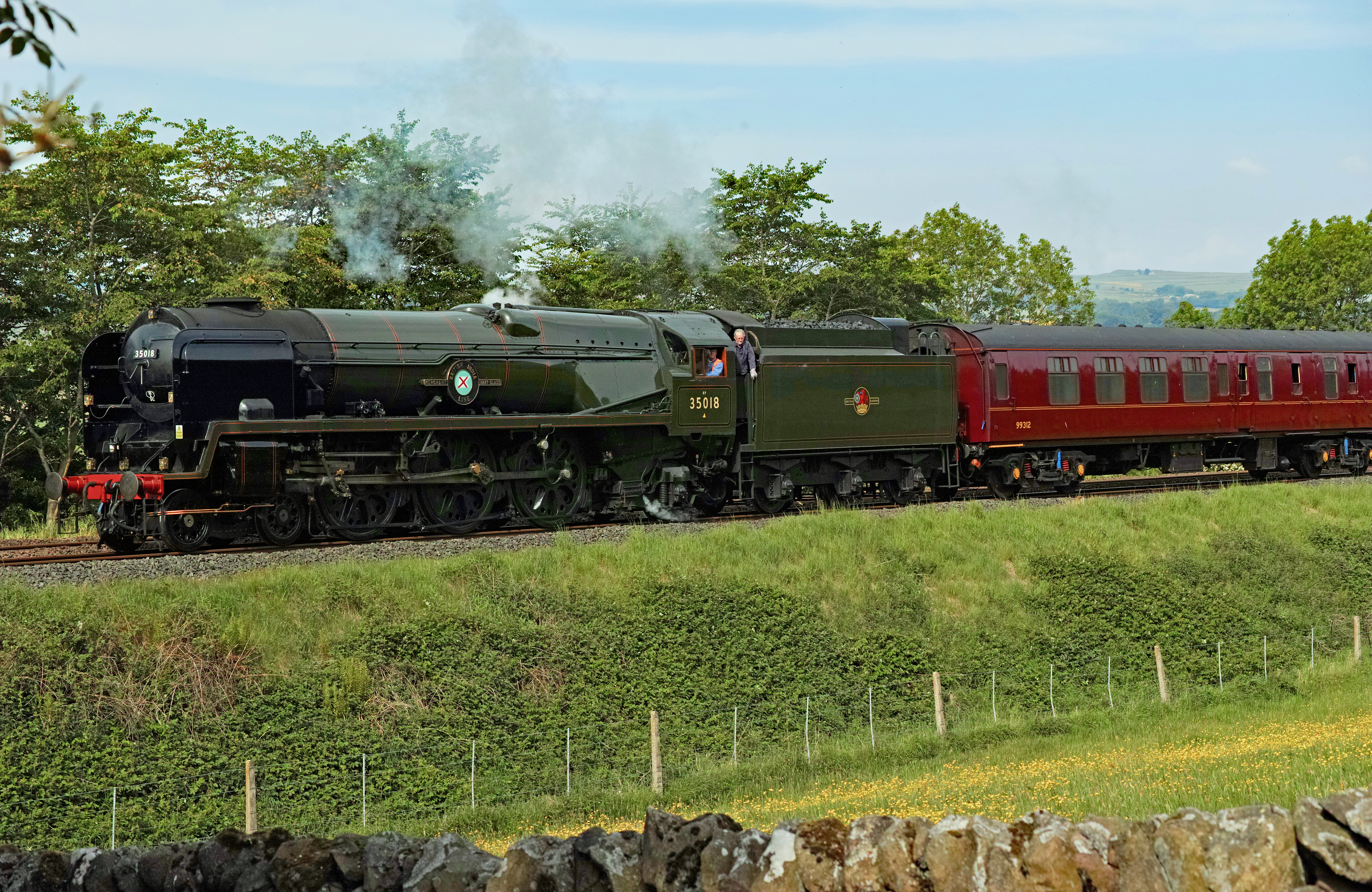
Between Carnforth and York May 2018
