= War Department (United Kingdom) =

Former British government department

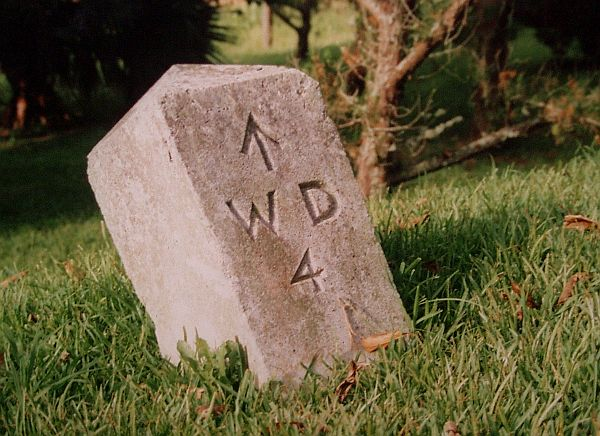
War Department Ordnance Survey marker, Bermuda, showing the WD broad arrow symbol (top)

The War Department was the United Kingdom government department responsible for the supply of equipment to the armed forces of the United Kingdom and the pursuance of military activity. In 1857, it became the War Office. Within the War Office, the name 'War Department' remained in use to describe the military transport services of the War Department Fleet and the War Department Railways.

== History ==
In 1794, the position of Secretary of State for War was created. The Secretary's department was at first unofficially known as the War Department. Colonial affairs were later added and it became the Colony Department. After the outbreak of war with revolutionary France it became Colony and War Department and on the restoration of peace in 1815 the Colonial Department. In February 1855, the offices of the Secretary of State for War, and Secretary at War were merged and the new department and became the War Department once again until 1857 when it became the War Office. In 1964, the department became the Ministry of Defence.

== War Department Railways ==
One aspect of the War Department's work was the supply of locomotives and rolling stock for use on railways in the United Kingdom, other parts of the British Empire, and in theatres of conflict.

In World War I, the War Department ran the War Department Light Railways which were a system of narrow gauge trench railways used for the supply of ammunition and stores, the transport of troops and the evacuation of the wounded.

In World War II, large numbers of steam locomotives were produced, as well as some diesel locomotives, of varying gauges to suit the area of planned operation. After the end of the war, these locomotives were largely disposed of to various railways around the world, though some were retained for peacetime use on UK military railways. Of those that were sold, examples of three types ended up as part of the British Railways fleet (where they were often referred to as 'Austerity' locos):

- Hunslet Austerity 0-6-0ST, BR numbers 68006–68080
- WD Austerity Class 8F 2-8-0, BR numbers 90000–90732
- WD Austerity Class 8F 2-10-0, BR numbers 90750–90774

For more details see Steam locomotives of British Railways.

== See also ==
- Broad arrow
