= A2 class =

A2 class or Class A2 may refer to:

- A2-class Melbourne tram
- LNER Class A2, 4-6-2 steam locomotives
- LNER Peppercorn Class A2, 4-6-2 steam locomotives
- LNER Thompson Class A2, 4-6-2 steam locomotives
- Milwaukee Road class A2, 4-4-2 steam locomotives
- Victorian Railways A2 class, 4-6-0 steam locomotives
