= LNER Thompson Class A2/3 =

Class of British express passenger locomotive

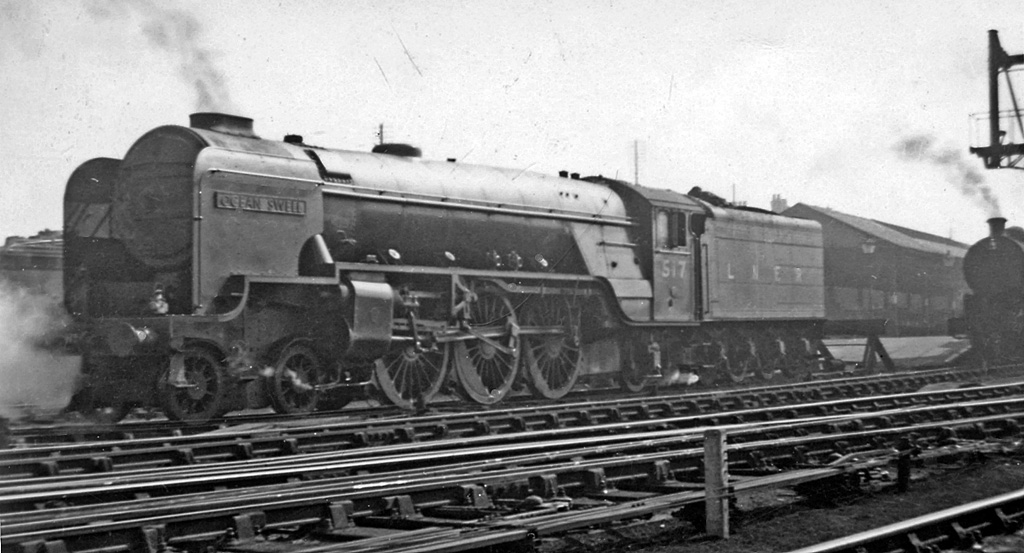
- No. 517 Ocean Swell in 1947
Type and origin
- Power type: Steam
- Designer: Edward Thompson
- Build date: 1946
- Total produced: 15
Specifications
- Configuration
  - Whyte: 4-6-2
- Gauge: 4 ft 8 1/2 in (1,435 mm)
- Driver dia.: 6 ft 2 in (1.880 m)
- Loco weight: 101.5 long tons (103.1 t)
- Boiler pressure: 250 psi (1.72 MPa)
- Cylinders: Three
- Cylinder size: 19 in × 26 in (483 mm × 660 mm)
Performance figures
- Tractive effort: 40,430 lbf (179.84 kN)
Career
- Operators: London and North Eastern Railway; British Railways
- Class: A2/3
- Power class: 8P7F
- Numbers: LNER 500 and 511-524; BR 60500 and 60511-60524
- Withdrawn: November 1962 - June 1963, February - June 1965
- Disposition: All scrapped

The London and North Eastern Railway (LNER) Class A2/3 was a class of 4-6-2 steam locomotives. They were newly constructed locomotives, fulfilling the requirement identified by Edward Thompson for a standard express passenger locomotive of the 4-6-2 arrangement with 6 ft 2 in (1.880 m) driving wheels. Fifteen engines were constructed according to this original design, but following the retirement of Thompson as CME, the remaining fifteen locomotives that were planned were immediately redesigned and ultimately emerged as Peppercorn Class A2.

== Background ==
When Edward Thompson was appointed chief mechanical engineer of the London and North Eastern Railway in April 1941, he envisaged a new standardisation programme involving ten locomotive designs including two Pacific types. These were an express passenger type (designated A1) with 6 ft 8 in (2.032 m) driving wheels and a 'heavy passenger and freight' type (designated A2) with 6 ft 2 in (1.880 m) driving wheels. He was not able to proceed with his plan due to the Second World War but did try out some of his ideas by rebuilding Nigel Gresley's P2 class 2-8-2 as A2/2 pacifics and building the last four V2 class already on order as A2/1 Pacifics. In April 1944, Thompson finally received authority to build thirty new locomotives of his A2 type during 1945, and a further thirteen during 1946.

== Design ==
The basic design of the locomotive was similar to the A2/2 rebuilds in terms of the frames, boiler and motion, but boiler pressure was increased to 250 psi (1.72 MPa) and the cylinder diameter was reduced to 19 in (483 mm). The locomotives retained Thompson's divided drive with the middle cylinder driving the first pair of driving wheels and the outside cylinders the middle pair. However, in order to have three connecting rods of the same length with three independent sets of Walschaerts valve gear, the outside cylinders were set back behind the bogie.

== Building ==
The locomotives were due to be built at Doncaster works but were subject to various delays and so only the first, No. 500 appeared in traffic in May 1946, prior to Thompson's retirement aged sixty-five, the following month. Fourteen further examples were then under construction and appeared under Thompson's successor Arthur Peppercorn, between July 1946 and September 1947. After trials during the summer and autumn 1946 Peppercorn decided not to build the remaining locomotives authorised until he had made modifications to the design. In fact, O. S. Nock has suggested that the Doncaster staff had begun amending the design before Thompson's retirement. The class was then redesignated A2/3, and the Peppercorn design became the standard A2 class.

== Performance ==
The class performed adequately but according to Nock, they suffered from 'the long spacing between the bogie and the leading coupled wheels, resulting in undue flexing of the frames and constant troubles from the outside pipe connections to the valve chests.' However, in the opinion of Allen the A2/3 class were 'the best 4-6-2s turned out during his [Thompson's] superintendence.'

== Stock list ==
With the exception of the prototype engine 60500 Edward Thompson (who was named after the designer, Edward Thompson) all of the locomotives were named after the winners of major flat races between 1941 and 1946; apart from Honeyway (winner of the Champion Stakes in 1946), all won one or more of the British Classic Races:

LNER No.	BR No.	Name	Entered stock	Withdrawn	Disposal Date
500	60500	Edward Thompson	24 May 1946	16 June 1963	12 September 1963
511	60511	Airborne	July 1946	November 1962	
512	60512	Steady Aim	August 1946	June 1965	
513	60513	Dante	August 1946	April 1963	
514	60514	Chamossaire	September 1946	December 1962	
515	60515	Sun Stream	October 1946	November 1962	
516	60516	Hycilla	November 1946	November 1962	
517	60517	Ocean Swell	November 1946	November 1962	
518	60518	Tehran	December 1946	November 1962	
519	60519	Honeyway	February 1947	December 1962	
520	60520	Owen Tudor	March 1947	June 1963	
521	60521	Watling Street	May 1947	November 1962	
522	60522	Straight Deal	June 1947	June 1965	
523	60523	Sun Castle	August 1947	June 1963	
524	60524	Herringbone	September 1947	February 1965	

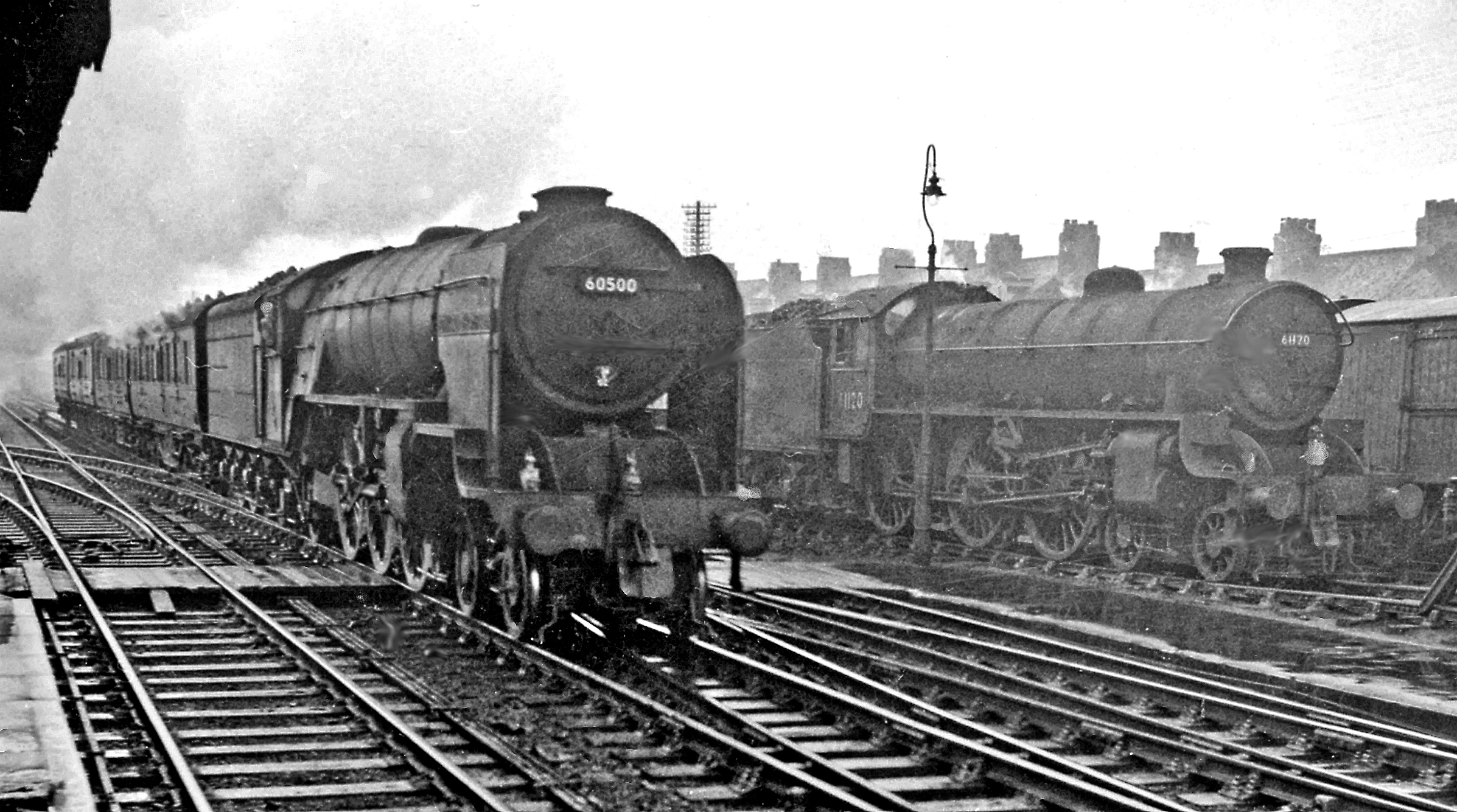
No. 60500, 'Edward Thompson' entering Retford 6 September 1962.

== Accidents and incidents ==
On 7 January 1957, No. 60520 Owen Tudor was hauling an express passenger train which overran signals and crashed into the rear of a local train at Welwyn Garden City, Hertfordshire.

== Withdrawal ==
The A2/3s were withdrawn from stock between August 1962 and March 1965 and none were preserved.

Year	Quantity in service at start of year	Quantity withdrawn	Locomotive numbers	Notes
1962	15	8	60511/14–19/21	
1963	7	4	60500/13/20/23	
1964	3	0	–	
1965	3	3	60512/22/24	

== Models ==
Apple Green Engines produce a ready-to-run model of the A2/3 in 4 mm scale. PDK and DJH both sell 4 mm scale kits of the A2/3. Crownline have also produced a 4 mm scale kit, but this is no longer available.

DJH also sell a kit of the A2/3 for O gauge (7 mm scale).

As of 2020 Hornby have announced a ready to run A2/3 for their range of models aimed for release in December 2020
