= LNER Peppercorn Class A2 60532 Blue Peter =

4-6-2 locomotive built 1948

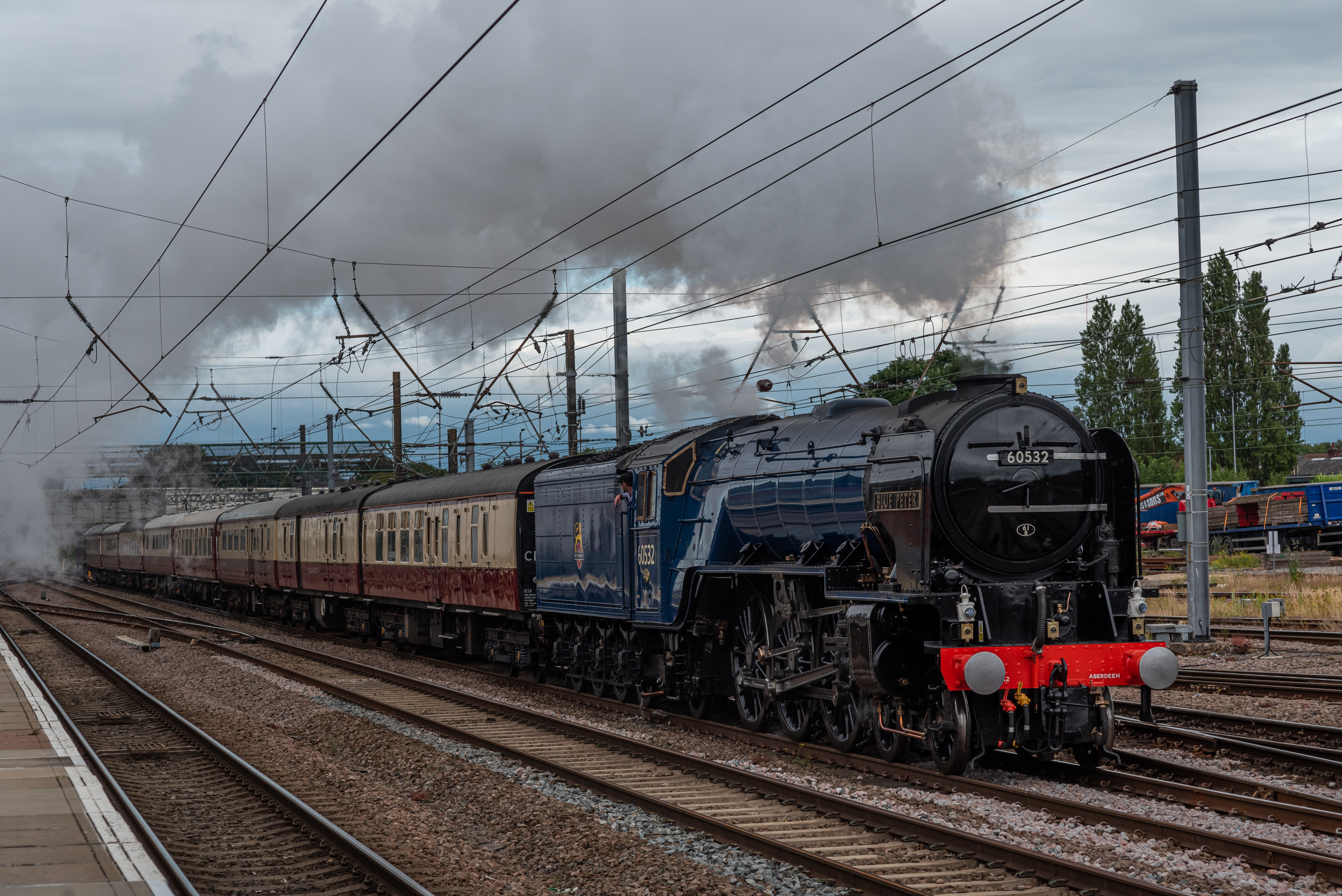
- Blue Peter passes through Doncaster with the London King's Cross-York railtour on July 13, 2024
Type and origin
- Power type: Steam
- Designer: Arthur Peppercorn
- Builder: Doncaster Works
- Serial number: 2023
- Build date: 25 March 1948
Specifications
- Configuration
  - Whyte: 4-6-2
  - UIC: 2'C1'
- Gauge: 4 ft 8 1/2 in (1,435 mm)
- Leading dia.: 3 ft 2 in (0.965 m)
- Driver dia.: 6 ft 2 in (1.880 m)
- Trailing dia.: 3 ft 8 in (1.118 m)
- Wheelbase: 60 ft 6 in (18.440 m)
- Length: 71 ft 0.5 in (21.654 m)
- Axle load: 22 long tons (22.4 t)
- Loco weight: 101 long tons (102.6 t; 113.1 short tons)
- Total weight: 160.5 long tons (163.1 t; 179.8 short tons)
- Fuel type: Coal
- Fuel capacity: 9 long tons (9.1 t)
- Water cap.: 5,000 imp gal (23,000 L)
- Firebox
  - Grate area: 50 sq ft (4.6 m^{2})
- Boiler pressure: 250 psi (1.72 MPa) superheated
- Heating surface
  - Firebox: 245 sq ft (22.8 m^{2})
  - Tubes: 1,212 sq ft (112.6 m^{2})
  - Flues: 1,005 sq ft (93.4 m^{2})
- Superheater
  - Heating area: 680 sq ft (63 m^{2})
- Cylinders: Three
- Cylinder size: 19×26 in (487×660 mm)
- Valve gear: Walschaerts, 10 in piston valves
Performance figures
- Tractive effort: 40,430 lbf (179.84 kN)
Career
- Class: LNER: A2
- Power class: BR: 8P7F
- Numbers: 60532 (painted); 98832 (TOPS)
- Axle load class: Route Availability 9
- Current owner: Royal Scot Locomotive and General Trust
- Disposition: Operational, mainline certified

LNER Peppercorn Class A2 No. 60532 Blue Peter is a 4-6-2 ("Pacific") steam locomotive built in 1948 at Doncaster Works to a design by Arthur Peppercorn, hauling express passenger services on British Railways' North Eastern Region. It is the only Peppercorn A2 in existence after the 14 other locomotives of its class were scrapped. Blue Peter was withdrawn from operation in 1966 and was bought for preservation in 1968. It gained fame in the 1970s and beyond following a campaign for its restoration on the BBC television series Blue Peter, and the locomotive has subsequently been featured several times in the programme. In late 1994, it was involved in a severe wheel slip incident in Durham, damaging its running gear. It was later repaired and continued mainline excursion service in 1996 until 2001. In 2014, Blue Peter was purchased by the Royal Scot Locomotive and General Trust, where it received an extensive overhaul, and returned to steam in 2024.

== History ==
=== British Railways (1948–1966) ===
No. 60532 was outshopped from Doncaster Works on 25 March 1948 as the eighth member of the Peppercorn A2, and the first of its class to enter traffic under British Railways numbering. In LNER tradition, it was named after a famous racehorse; Blue Peter was a Thoroughbred owned by Harry Primrose, 6th Earl of Rosebery, which in 1939 won races including The Derby and the 2000 Guineas. The horse earned almost £32,000 for Lord Rosebery, more than enough to purchase three LNER 4-6-2 locomotives at the time.

Initially, Blue Peter was allocated to British Railways' North Eastern Region shed at York, working express passenger services on the East Coast Main Line. In September 1949, Blue Peter and four other A2s went to Doncaster Works, where a number of modifications were made to them such as the fitting of a multiple valve regulator and a double blastpipe and chimney, together with Kylchap cowls and the removal of the self-cleaning apparatus in the smokebox. Afterwards, these five A2s, including 60532, moved to Scotland to make up for deficiencies experienced with the Thompson Class A2/2s (rebuilt LNER Class P2). Blue Peter was allocated to Aberdeen, with all the Scottish-based A2s used mainly on express passenger services between Aberdeen and Edinburgh, which benefited from their greater power and acceleration. In 1951, Blue Peter achieved 100 mph (161 km/h) during a trial run between Stonehaven and Montrose with the Aberdonian.

After the English-based A2s were withdrawn from service in 1962 and 1963, the three remaining Scottish A2s remained in service on the Aberdeen route until June 1966. Replaced by diesel power, Blue Peter was reallocated to Dundee Tay Bridge shed in Dundee and became the last Peppercorn Pacific to be overhauled at Darlington Works. As a result, it was often requested for rail tours, working as far as Holyhead and Exeter St Davids. Blue Peter's final rail tour was in October 1966 over the Waverley Line and the West Coast Main Line over Beattock summit. It was withdrawn from service on 31 December 1966, and put into storage at Thornton Junction shed.

=== Preservation (1966–present) ===
In 1968, Blue Peter was purchased by Geoff Drury, who originally wanted to buy an LNER Peppercorn Class A1, but the last one No. 60145 Saint Mungo had firebox issues and scrapped two years prior. After preservation, Blue Peter was the subject of a campaign for its restoration on the BBC Television series Blue Peter, and the locomotive has subsequently been featured several times in the programme.

The restoration work was undertaken at York, Leeds and Doncaster Works, where it was repainted in LNER apple green livery as No. 532, the number it would have carried if built pre-nationalisation. 60,000 people witnessed its renaming by the BBC Blue Peter programme presenters at a Doncaster Works Open Day in 1971. Around 1974, Blue Peter was steamed up for the first time at the Tyseley Locomotive Works in Birmingham. During this restoration under Drury's ownership, the locomotive was fitted with a 5-note whistle from New Zealand Railways, mounted on the right side of the smoke box, and has been used as a supplementary whistle ever since along with its standard LNER bell whistle. Blue Peter is currently the only mainline steam locomotive in the UK to have an American-type chime whistle.

Moved to the Dinting Railway Centre, it did little running and in late 1987, the North Eastern Locomotive Preservation Group (NELPG) took charge of 60532 and A4 Bittern on long-term loan from the Drury family. Restored at the Imperial Chemical Industries works at Wilton, Redcar and Cleveland, 60532 was renamed by the BBC Blue Peter programme for a second time in December 1991.

It was then moved to the North Yorkshire Moors Railway for running in. The locomotive obtained its main line certificate in 1992 and subsequently worked many rail tours over the Settle and Carlisle Railway and as far north as its old depot of Aberdeen.

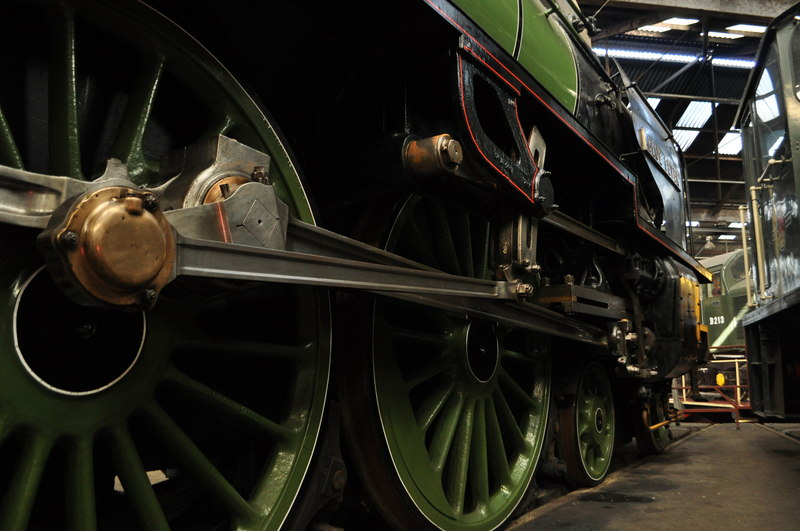
A close-up of Blue Peter's wheels and valve gear in 2011

On 1 October 1994, during a run from Edinburgh to York, 60532 suffered severe damage to its running gear from a catastrophic uncontrolled violent wheel slip at a wheel rotational speed of 140 mph (225 km/h) after crossing the Durham Viaduct and an unscheduled stop at Durham station. The damaged running gear parts included the outside valve gear, coupling rods and axleboxes; a driving wheel also moved on its axle. After the incident, the locomotive was moved to Thornaby MPD, where the repair work took 18 months to complete. On 31 May 1996, 60532 was then moved again to the NYMR for running in. The locomotive resumed its mainline career in November 1996, working a charter from Middlesbrough to Preston via Newcastle and Carlisle.

In 1998, 60532 ran an Edinburgh to London excursion to mark the 40th anniversary of the Blue Peter TV programme. The trip was Day's Out Limited's "Heart of Midlothian" which had run from Kings Cross to Edinburgh behind a diesel and 60532 worked the journey south with members of the Blue Peter team traveling on board. One presenter Stuart Miles even travelled on the footplate between Newark and Peterborough as that was the section that Mallard set the speed record in 1938.

60532's mainline certificate expired in September 2001 and after that, she was then based at the NYMR, where it worked until the end of the 2002 season when her boiler certificate expired. It was subsequently displayed at the Darlington Railway Centre and Museum. On 22 May 2007, BBC Look North News reported that the locomotive was being moved into storage in Chesterfield, due to the renovation of the museum, and would not be returning.

After 60532 was moved to the Barrow Hill Roundhouse in Derbyshire, the NELPG hoped to raise £600,000 for restoration of the locomotive to main line running. There she was repainted to British Railways apple green livery, similar to the first livery used on the A1 Class 60163 Tornado.

In October 2014, the engine was sold to Jeremy Hosking under the ownership of the Royal Scot Locomotive and General Trust (RSL&GT), who planned to restore it back to main line standard. The locomotive was moved to the LNWR Heritage facility at Crewe in May 2015. During the overhaul, it was discovered that centre cylinder block was cracked, so a newly fabricated one was made to replace the original. On 21 August 2023, the engine's boiler passed a hydrostatic test. In March 2024, Blue Peter moved under its own power for the first time in 22 years.

During 1‒3 August 2025, Blue Peter was on display for the Greatest Gathering held at Derby Litchurch Lane Works.

== Bibliography ==
- Morrison, Gavin (2004). The Power of the A2s. Power Series (1st ed.). Oxford Publishing Company. ISBN 0-86093-588-4.
- Sharpe, Brian (2007). Doncaster's Railway Legends (1st ed.). Mortons Media Group. ISBN 978-0-9552868-7-2.
