= Edward Thompson (engineer) =

English railway engineer (1881–1954)

- Born: 25 June 1881; Marlborough, Wiltshire, England
- Died: 15 July 1954 (aged 73)
- Education: Marlborough College; Pembroke College, Cambridge
- Spouse: Edith Gwendolen Raven
- Parent: Francis Thompson
- Engineering career
- Discipline: Mechanical engineering
- Employer(s): North Eastern Railway, Great Northern Railway, London and North Eastern Railway

Edward Thompson (25 June 1881 – 15 July 1954) was an English railway engineer, and was Chief Mechanical Engineer of the London and North Eastern Railway between 1941 and 1946. Edward Thompson was born at Marlborough, Wiltshire on 25 June 1881. He was the son of Francis Thompson, assistant master at Marlborough College. He was educated at Marlborough before taking the Mechanical Science Tripos at Pembroke College, Cambridge, earning a third class degree. Thompson entered the railway scene after education, contrasting that of his predecessor Nigel Gresley, who had also attended Marlborough after gaining practical experience as a pupil at Horwich Works.

== Biography ==
Edward Thompson was born in Marlborough, Wiltshire to Francis Thompson. His grandfather Francis ran a tailoring business in London.

He would be educated at Marlborough College, same as his predecessor. After education at Marlborough, he would attend Pembroke College and be influenced by Sir George Stokes, ultimately graduating with a third class degree.

=== Pre-grouping Career ===
After graduation Thompson worked in both industry and the railways for a while. He worked as a pupil at Beyer, Peacock's drawing office, before moving to work at the Midland Railway's Derby shed. By 1910 he was assistant divisional locomotive superintendent on the North Eastern Railway (NER), in which capacity he gave evidence at the inquiry into the fatal accident between two goods trains at Darlington on 15 November 1910. In 1912 he was appointed Carriage and Wagon Superintendent at Doncaster for the Great Northern Railway (GNR). He served in the British Army during the First World War, and was twice mentioned in dispatches, and awarded OBE, Military Division for action at the Battle of Passchendaele.

Upon demobilisation, he returned to the railways, alternating between the wagon works at Darlington and Doncaster, and consequently between the North Eastern and Great Northern respectively. In 1920 he returned to the NER at York as Carriage and Wagon Superintendent, and joined the LNER upon grouping. He became Workshop Manager at Stratford Works in 1930 and was able to make significant improvements although the works layout prevented major changes there. He would become a Mechanical Engineer at Darlington and Doncaster in 1934 and 1938 respectively, before becoming Chief Mechanical Engineer (CME) of the London and North Eastern Railway (LNER) in 1941 after the death of Nigel Gresley.

Edward Thompson would marry Guendolen Raven, daughter of Sir Vincent Raven, CME of the North Eastern Railway. After Guen's death in 1938, he subsequently became very lonely.

During World War Two, he met Richard Hardy by chance, who was working on the footplate of a locomotive without permission. He was fond of the boy and the two boarded a train to Doncaster, where Thompson spoke to him with great enthusiasm about ongoing projects. Richard Hardy would join the LNER and become part of Thompson's design team.

=== Wartime CME ===
When Thompson was appointed CME of the LNER, he became in charge of a railway which had a greatly reduced labour force and foundry capacity. To remedy this, he sought to start a much needed standardisation programme out of an urgent need for simplicity. The LNER was continuing to operate almost 5,000 locomotives across 160 classes from pre-grouping companies, many of which were aging and unreliable. He intended to reduce the number of locomotive classes from 160 to just 19 classes by scrapping or removing most of the pre-grouping era locomotives of the LNER. Some believed that in doing so, he intended to "rid the LNER of Gresley", when in reality he sought to retain most of his predecessor's work.

The standardisation was a further reflection on the difference between Gresley and Thompson. The LNER had never been in a position to undergo large-scale re-equipment programmes such as those afforded by the LMS, and for much of its existence, the LNER used a large fleet of pre-grouping locomotives for everything except the very top-flight services. As such, Gresley believed that rebuilding and improving was usually enough in a lot of cases, and where it was not, he designed a locomotive specifically for the job. Examples of each are the D16/3 Claud Hamiltons (rebuilt), the B12/3 (re-boilered and new valve gear) and his K4 (built for the West Highland Line) and P2 (for the Aberdeen to Edinburgh route). Thompson instead advocated for constructing and maintaining a small variety of classes, and spent time during his tenure as CME in developing a list of classes either to be maintained (A10, A3, A4 etc.), rebuilt to his standard (B2, A2/2, K1/1 etc.) or built to new standard designs (B1, L1 etc.).

The programme had the desired effect of reducing the variety of LNER classes, and allowed the withdrawal of a number of elderly and worn out pre-grouping Atlantics, 4-6-0 and more. However, the number of locomotive classes and boilers did not change significantly until after he had left office. While his goals are correct, his short time in office limited the successes that he may have.

Locomotives to be maintained or designed under the Standardisation plan
Class	Wheel Arrangement	Designer
A1	4-6-2	Thompson
A2	4-6-2	Thompson
A10/A3	4-6-2	Gresley
A4	4-6-2	Gresley
B1	4-6-0	Thompson
B16	4-6-0	Raven
B17	4-6-0	Gresley
D49	4-4-0	Gresley
J11	0-6-0	Robinson
J50	0-6-0T	Gresley
K3	2-6-0	Gresley
L1	2-6-4	Thompson
O1	2-8-0	Thompson
O4	2-8-0	Robinson
Q1	0-8-0T	Thompson
V1	2-6-2T	Gresley
V3	2-6-2T	Gresley

=== Retirement and death ===
Edward Thompson retired in June 1946 at the age of 65 after holding the post for five years and was succeeded by Arthur Peppercorn. The first locomotive of his final design, the A2/3, entered traffic on 24 May and was named after its designer, coincidentally as the 2,000th engine constructed at Doncaster. At the naming ceremony, Sir Ronald Matthews paid tribute to the departing CME, thanking him for his service to the company through difficult wartime situation.

After retirement, he would regularly attend the Institution of Mechanical Engineers (IMechE), the MCC and the Oxford and Cambridge University Club at Pall Mall. He would attend lectures at IMechE, but did not comment, research or present papers himself. He maintained his friendship with other CMEs, such as William Stanier, both of which congratulated each other over new locomotives such as their respective mixed traffic designs, his successor Arthur Peppercorn and former colleague and CME of the Southern Railway Oliver Bulleid, the four together attending the opening of the Rugby Locomotive Testing Station in 1948. He continued to have an interest in the railway scene, taking an interest in British Railways' standardisation scheme developing under Robert Riddles, which mirrored his own ideas and changes implemented during the war. Members of his team, such as Edward Windle, would join the engineering team at BR.

He died during the night of 14 July 1954 in North Wales, having suffered from severe chest pains. His funeral was held by the Church of England with no friends or relatives present in accordance to his wishes. Most of his estate was passed to his surviving sister and some to his friends.

== Thompson's designs ==
=== Pacifics ===
Thompson rebuilt a select number of Gresley locomotives that were problematic and had low availability, in addition to attempting to design his own locomotives based on Gresley designs. While Thompson was critical of some of Gresley's design practices, he continued with some design features such as the use of a double Kylchap exhaust and large smokeboxes and his predecessor's influence was still visible in his design. Thompson's Pacific locomotives all retained three cylinders, but with divided drive and 3 independent sets of Walschaerts valve gear rather than Gresley's own valve gear design. The outside cylinders were placed behind the front bogie with the inside cylinder well forward, giving his Pacific locomotives an elongated look which was not commonly seen on the LNER.

Claims of Thompson's locomotive underperforming suggests that his designs failed in multiple aspects, with accusations including excessive wheel slip, frame fractures, going against LNER practice and requiring more maintenance. However, Simon A.C. Martin has found no evidence suggesting that they were considered as failures and in cases, contrary to popular claims, found that they were capable and reliable locomotives. While Thompson's Pacifics may have slipped more than other Pacific types on the LNER network due to a poorer weight distribution with a longer frontend, all Pacific locomotives are prone to wheelslip, with Bulleid's Pacifics being just as, if not more infamous for their wheel slip. Thompson also instituted a different maintenance regime for his locomotives where they would be shopped more often for smaller repairs and prevent issues from cascading into major accidents.

Despite some faults, Thompson's Pacifics were well designed and retained the ability for high speed running, being able to hold speed in excess of 90 mph (140 km/h), with design features such as the steam circuit carrying over into Arthur Peppercorn's designs. Peppercorn's A2 design was a further development of Thompson's A2/3 design, which itself was a development of the A2/2 rebuilt from Gresley P2s. Under Arthur Peppercorn, some of Thompson's locomotives were fitted with boilers to Peppercorn's design, reviving the "banjo dome" featured on Gresley locomotives.

=== Class B1 ===
Thompson's most successful design was the two-cylinder mixed traffic Class B1 4-6-0. The LNER did not have a general purpose mixed traffic engine, such as the highly successful GWR Hall Class or the LMS Stanier 5MT Black Fives. The B1 was based loosely on Gresley's class B17 but omitted the third inside cylinder. The cylinders used were from Gresley's H3/K2 Class and the boiler was a standard 5 ft 6 in diameter No. 2 boiler. The layout was simplified for easier maintenance and more effective wartime running.

The first batch of the Class B1 was authorised in mid-1942, totaling ten with the first being a prototype for further testing. No. 8301 would be frequented by Thompson while under construction, who would ride on the footplate on its first day of operations. It would be named Springbok out of respect for the visiting Jan Smuts and South African soldiers. Testing of the B1 would continue well into 1944, comparing it to other locomotives to be replaced. The design proved to be free-steaming, economical and simple to maintain. Construction of the Class B1 was slow beyond the first member, and it took until June 1944 for the other nine members to be completed. More than 400 B1s were built between 1946 and 1952, with British Railways continuing B1 production after nationalisation. Up to 409 B1s were available at any time as one was written off and not replaced after an accident.

The Thompson B1 equaled the LMS Black Five locomotives during the inter-regional exchange trials in the first year of British Railways. Robert Riddles, who would come to design the range of British Railways Standard Classes, praised the B1 for its capability.

=== Class L1 ===
Thompson's Class L1 were developed due to a demand from the running department for a modern version of the Metropolitan Railway K class which were reaching the end of their lives. While Gresley V1 and V3 locomotives were available, they were deemed insufficient. It was ordered in large numbers to serve across the LNER's system as a part of the standardisation scheme. It used an uprated boiler based on the V3 with larger fireboxes and water tanks and B1 cylinders and 5 ft 2 in (1.57 m) wheels. Testing under George Musgrave showed they steamed well, had a good reserve of power and accelerated quickly.

Initially thirty were ordered and all emerged by 1948. An additional seventy were ordered from North British Locomotive Company and Robert Stephenson & Hawthorn and delivered to British Railways. Only when in widespread service did problems with overheating axleboxes appear. Experiments to solve these problems were unsuccessful and the L1s finished their working lives without much modifications or reaching their true potential.

==== Other rebuilds ====
The Robinson Class Q4 0-8-0 tender engines were one of the first to be rebuilt by Thompson. Having reached the end of their service life by the late 1930s, most of the class were due to be scrapped. However, with wartime restricting new build locomotives and in need of more powerful shunting engines, Thompson opted to rebuild the design into a tank engine. Most of the old engine, such as the cylinders, motion and boiler, were reused, producing the Thompson Q1, although modifications were made to accommodate an enclosed cab, and the initial 1,500 gallon side tanks were later upgraded to hold 2,000 gallons of water.

In 1942, Thompson rebuilt the Robinson Class J11 and Gresley D49/2 No.365 The Morpeth. The J11/3 was not visually distinct from its original condition, but was modified with new cylinders, valve gears and valve motion, requiring modifications to the engine frames, boiler and chimney. The rebuilding had the desired effect and another thirty were converted, but most of the class remained in their as built condition. The Gresley D49/2 were fitted with Lentz rotary valve gear, but trials proved the piston valve D49/1 to be superior and the D49/2 were due to be converted, save No. 365 The Morperth which was fitted with rotary cam shaft valve gear controlled by steam pressure in 1939. With the camshaft damaged in 1941 and placed in store, Thompson modified it to return it to service. It was rebuilt with two inside cylinders with Stephenson motion, an arrangement similar to the Robinson Class D11. Although Thompson featured the modified locomotive in his standardisation plans, after trials showed little increase in performance or reliability, the experiment was not repeated and no longer pursued.

To boost the amount of available mixed traffic 4-6-0 engines in traffic, Thompson proposed the rebuilding of the Robinson Class B3. The engines were not particularly successful and had heavy coal consumption, and under Gresley had their valve gear replaced with Caprotti valve gear. In 1943, No. 6166 Earl Haig was awaiting repairs for its cracked cylinders, and was selected for rebuilding. Again, most of the engine was retained, with a new diagram 100A boiler and outside Walschaerts valve gear fitted, designated the B3/3. It performed well but suffered from cracked frames, and no more were rebuilt, with Earl Haig being the last of the six members of the class to be withdrawn.

The LNER Class O4 was a heavy goods design originating from the First World War, and the LNER continued to operate a large number of them. While some have already been rebuilt under Gresley, Thompson sought to use them as part of his standardisation scheme. Retaining the frames and wheels, the boiler, cylinders, cab and running plate was modified to create the class O1. Some, where the condition of the cylinders permitted, would not undergo the rather extensive reconstruction and were simply fitted with new cabs and boiler to become the O4/8 subclass.

A total of 30 Gresley B17 would be rebuilt to form the B2, with two examples becoming the designated engines for hauling Royal Trains. LNER Class K4 No. 3445 MacCailin Mor had its middle cylinder removed, becoming the prototype of the Peppercorn Class K1, designated the K1/1. Similarly, a K3 had its middle cylinder removed to become the K5, easing maintenance.

=== Coach design ===
Thompson improved passenger safety by introducing steel-bodied coaches to the LNER. Previously the LNER had Gresley-designed coaches, the most famous of which had teak bodies but by 1940s standards these were considered insufficiently safe in a collision. Therefore, during the Second World War Thompson designed new all-steel coaches that became a forerunner of British Railways Mark 1 design.

== Controversy ==
=== Thompson VS Gresley ===
It has been suggested that the two can be considered as rivals. Had the grouping not taken place, Thompson was in line to become the Chief Mechanical Engineer on the North Eastern Railway, and perhaps even the LNER itself. Given the rivalry between the Great Northern Railway and North Eastern Railway and Gresley's disagreements with Sir Vincent Raven, CME of the NER and father-in-law to Thompson, this may not have been a far-fetched interpretation of Thompson's actions during the war years.

In reality, Thompson's view on Gresley is quoted as “the greatest British locomotive engineer since Churchward”. However, he also recognised Gresley's single-mindedness in putting design before everything else, such as his specialisation of rolling stock maintenance. It is clear, despite the differences in engineering opinion and approach, Thompson greatly admired Gresley, hoping to refine his predecessor's work. Bert Spencer remarks that Thompson introduced many changes to improve productivity, whereas Gresley and Bulleid placed their attention on locomotive design.

=== Thompson as CME ===
Some have claimed that the LNER board of directors had no immediate successor in mind, and went to various railway companies to seek a suitable replacement. Simon A.C. Martin however, in analyzing the LNER board notes of the time, found no evidence supporting this claim. Engineers that are said to have been approached included Southern Railway's CME and former colleague Oliver Bulleid, J.F. Harrison, who would go on to design the Duke of Gloucester, fellow Gresley assistant and Thompson's own successor Arthur Peppercorn or future railway historian E.S. Cox. Such tales regarding Peppercorn often suggest that Thompson used his seniority and political experience to sidestep Peppercorn.

The LNER board of directors had discussed upcoming potential appointments, seen through board minutes going back to the 1930s, and there are no such notes for discussion on the role of CME, even with Gresley reaching retirement age by the end of 1941. While this can be interpreted in several ways, an interpretation is that it is expected that Edward Thompson would take over the CME position due to his experience in maintaining locomotive and rolling stock.

In 1939, the LNER board formed what became to known as the Emergency Board in order to guide the railway through the war. The board consisted of the directors, stakeholders in addition to engineers and government representatives. Six months before his death, Gresley fell increasingly ill and failed to attend some of the board meetings, instead sending Edward Thompson, Arthur Peppercorn, occasionally J.F. Harrison or a combination of two out of the three. During the meetings, Thompson was acting in the CME position and Peppercorn as the assistant to the CME. According to LNER board minute 2823, 23 days after Sir Nigel Gresley's passing, the LNER Emergency Board recorded their loss of the great engineer, and in the same meeting, appointed Edward Thompson as CME. The LNER was aware that they had a well-rounded engineer in Thompson who could take over in the interim and lead the LNER through the difficult war time conditions.

=== Rebuilding Gresley's Locomotives ===
Thompson disagreed with Gresley on multiple things, and the biggest disagreement between the two would surround the Gresley conjugated valve gear for three-cylinder engines. This valve gear arrangement worked well during peacetime but experienced problems due to poor maintenance during the Second World War, giving Thompson justification for his criticism of the design. Thompson himself described the conjugated valve gear as Gresley's only real failure, but noted that Gresley himself would not admit to any failure in his own work.

Thompson would present the LNER board with an internal report in 1942 on the development, construction and maintenance of locomotives. He approached Sir William Stanier for a report on the conjugated valve gear fleet, who deputised the report to E.S. Cox. They were shown around LNER locomotive works and parts of the valve gear were presented for inspection. The report was written by Cox and signed off by Stanier, dated 8 June 1942 and titled "'Report on the "2 to 1" Gresley Valve gear on L.N.E.R 3-cylinder locomotives'". In the report, Cox was critical of the valve gear which was more prone to failure in wartime conditions and provided three broad recommendations: To stop building three-cylinder locomotives with conjugated valve gear; To rebuild some of the conjugated locomotives to have three sets of valve gear experimentally; and to modify the existing fleet to remedy the failure-prone middle big end.

With World War Two significantly reducing available manpower for maintenance and the necessary skills for maintaining the valve gear, Thompson received approval from the board to rebuild some of the more problematic members of Gresley's designs. As a class of six non-identical steam locomotives, the P2 class have been a cause of concern as to their low annual mileage and availability when compared to other Gresley Pacifics. Other problems of the class included crank axle failures at low speed, overheating axle boxes, high fuel consumption, cracking at joints in the frames all whilst causing track spreading on the Edinburgh-Aberdeen mainline. Having sent the rebuilt W1 4-6-4 locomotive to work with and be compared against the P2 Mikados in Scotland in 1942, the one-off experimental was found to be equally capable in pulling trains on the Edinburgh-Aberdeen mainline, giving credence to the idea that six-coupled locomotives could replace the six non-standard locomotives.

Thompson proceeded to first experimentally rebuild No. 2005 Thane of Fife as it had the lowest annual mileage and was reputedly the worst of the P2s. The rebuilt locomotive emerged partway through 1943 and achieved 45,732 miles by the end of the year, significantly outperforming the P2s. Arthur Peppercorn presented the board with a report on the operation of the rebuilt locomotive with great praise, and the board approved the rebuilding for the remaining five members. The rebuilds would become some of the best performing locomotives with high mileage and availability.

Later, E.S. Cox, who wrote the report arguing against the use of the Gresley Conjugated valve gear, would suggest that Thompson's rebuilding programme was intended to rid the LNER of Gresley's legacy. Such a claim would be repeated until modern day, but is backed with little evidence. In addition, despite other CMEs also rebuilding their predecessor's work, only Thompson's rebuilding programme attracted such a high level of attention and scrutiny, despite similar reasoning.

=== Great Northern ===
Perhaps Thompson's greatest controversy was his decision to rebuild the pioneer of the Gresley A1 class Great Northern to his (Thompson's) design. Some have blamed Thompson for letting his personal feelings towards Gresley cloud his judgement. In reality, the selection of locomotive was not the CME's decision and was made by the Locomotive Running Superintendent and verified by LNER Finance Department. Such a decision would have been made based on the proposed locomotive's age, total mileage to date, mileage since its last shopping and overall condition. As the first Gresley Pacific, Great Northern had been in service since 1922 and was also in the Doncaster workshop at the time, hence it was possibly selected out of expediency.

The design of the locomotive still retained Gresley design features, including the Diagram No. 107 boiler also used on A4s, the double Kylchap chimney and draughting arrangements, and externally still resembled a Gresley locomotive. Thompson adopted divided drive on the middle cylinder and had to move the leading wheels forward to accommodate the middle cylinders. The resulting locomotive was by no means a failure, contrary to claims of its poor performance. It was reliable and achieved high mileage, becoming the highest mileage Thompson Pacific by the time of its withdrawal, rivalling Gresley A4s and Peppercorn A1s.

Part of the controversy likely stemmed from the loss of the name Great Northern and Thompson's misreading of the sentiment towards the locomotive. Thompson did not like naming engines, and was furious when first of his B1 locomotive No. 8301 was named Springbok in honour of a visit by Jan Smuts. Similarly, when Thane of Fife and other P2 locomotives were rebuilt and entered traffic, their nameplates were not fitted. After entering traffic, Thane of Fife underwent extensive comparative testing on the Scottish section of the LNER against the yet-to-be rebuilt P2s, after which nameplates would be fitted again. However, the damage was done.

Many staff who worked under Gresley and Thompson were from the GNR, and may have feared the loss of the name that represented their origin in addition to the role of the first Gresley Pacific Great Northern in ushering in a new era of glamour and innovation for locomotive design. Thompson may also have intended the pioneer of the Gresley Pacifics to also become the flagship of his own locomotive designs, however his early retirement and Peppercorn's return to conventional design practices meant that his locomotives looked out of place when compared to both his predecessor and successor's engines.

Given LNER staff and railway enthusiasts' sentiment towards Great Northern, the distinct design choices of the rebuilt locomotive and the role of the locomotive in locomotive design within the LNER, it is perhaps unsurprising to see Thompson disliked by both his subordinates and enthusiasts.

== Locomotives designed by Edward Thompson ==
See: Locomotives of the London and North Eastern Railway#Thompson_designs

- Thompson A1/1 4-6-2 (1945)
- Thompson A2/1 4-6-2 (1944)
- Thompson A2/2 4-6-2 (1943)
- Thompson A2/3 4-6-2 (1946)
- Thompson B1 4-6-0 (1942)
- Thompson B3/3 4-6-0 (1943)
- Thompson B16/3 4-6-0 (1944)
- Thompson B2 4-6-0 (1945)
- Thompson K1/1 2-6-0 (1945)
- Thompson K5 2-6-0 (1945)
- Thompson L1 2-6-4T (1945)
- Thompson O1 2-8-0 (1944)
- Thompson Q1 0-8-0 (1942)

Business positions
Preceded by Nigel Gresley	Chief Mechanical Engineer of the London and North Eastern Railway; 1941–1946	Succeeded by Arthur Peppercorn
