= LNER Thompson Class O1 =

Class of 58 two-cylinder 2-8-0 locomotives

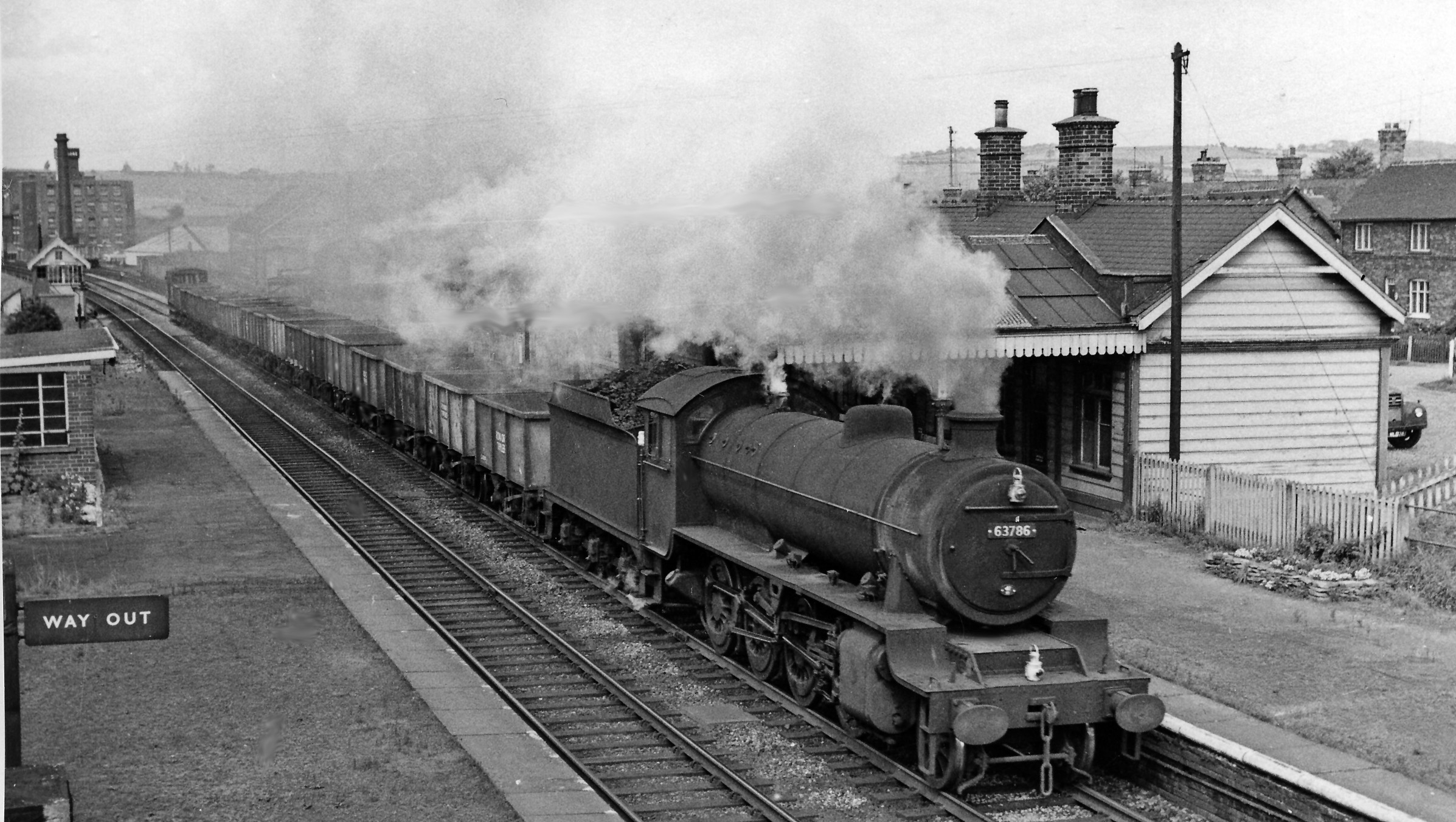
- No. 63786 at Killamarsh in 1963
Type and origin
- Power type: Steam
- Designer: Edward Thompson
- Rebuilder: LNER
- Rebuild date: 1944–49
- Number rebuilt: 58
Specifications
- Configuration
  - Whyte: 2-8-0
  - UIC: 1'D
- Gauge: 4 ft 8 1/2 in (1,435 mm) standard gauge
- Driver dia.: 4 ft 8 in (1.422 m)
- Loco weight: 73.3 long tons (74.5 t; 82.1 short tons)
- Fuel type: Coal
- Boiler pressure: 225 psi (1.55 MPa)
- Cylinders: Two, outside
- Cylinder size: 20 in × 26 in (508 mm × 660 mm)
Performance figures
- Tractive effort: 35,520 lbf (158.0 kN)
Career
- Class: London and North Eastern Railway; British Railways
- Power class: 8F
- Axle load class: Route Availability 6
- Locale: Eastern Region; North Eastern Region
- Withdrawn: 1962–1965
- Disposition: All scrapped

The London and North Eastern Railway (LNER) Thompson Class O1 was a class of 2-8-0 steam locomotive designed by Edward Thompson for freight work.

== Construction ==
Because of wartime restrictions on new-build locomotives in the 1940’s, they were rebuilds of LNER Class O4 "ROD" 2-8-0s that were built in 1911-1918 before and during World War I, although most of the locomotive was replaced during this rebuild during World War II. The first LNER rebuild took place in February 1944, at Gorton Works and a total of 58 locomotives were rebuilt to class O1 in total, with the last being locomotive 63856 in October 1949 during the early British Railways era, after which the programme was halted. The main modification to the original GCR Class 8K design was the incorporation of a standard LNER 100A boiler, Walschaerts valve gear and new cylinders. Rebuilding occurred whilst the LNER's 1946 renumbering was in progress: some locomotives were rebuilt and subsequently renumbered; some were renumbered when rebuilding was finished; and some were rebuilt having already been renumbered.

== British Railways ==
The locomotives passed to the Eastern and North Eastern Region of British Railways on 1 January 1948 and were given running numbers in the range 63570-63920. However, this range included many unrebuilt O4s.

All examples were withdrawn and scrapped between 1962 and 1965.

== Models ==
In 2013, Hornby Railways introduced an OO gauge model of the O1 in BR black livery.
