= LNER Thompson Class A2 =

LNER Thompson Class A2 may refer to:

- LNER Thompson Class A2/1, four locomotives (nos. 3696-9, later 507-510) built new in 1944–45 and modified from class V2 during construction
- LNER Thompson Class A2/2, six locomotives (nos. 2001-6, later 501-6) rebuilt from class P2 in 1943–44
- LNER Thompson Class A2/3, 15 locomotives (nos. 500, 511-524) built new in 1946–7

== See also ==
- LNER Class A2
- LNER Peppercorn Class A2
- London and North Eastern Railway
