= LNER Thompson Class Q1 =

Class of British steam locomotives

Type and origin
- Power type: Steam
- Designer: Edward Thompson (rebuild)
- Rebuild date: 1942–1945
- Number rebuilt: 13
Specifications
- Configuration
  - Whyte: 0-8-0T
- Gauge: 4 ft 8 1/2 in (1,435 mm) standard gauge
- Driver dia.: 4 ft 8 in (1.422 m)
- Loco weight: Q1/1: 69.9 long tons (71.0 t; 78.3 short tons); Q1/2: 73.65 long tons (74.83 t; 82.49 short tons)
- Fuel type: Coal
- Fuel capacity: Q1/1: 4.5 long tons (4.6 t; 5.0 short tons); Q1/2: 4 long tons (4.1 t; 4.5 short tons)
- Water cap.: Q1/1: 1,500 imp gal (6,800 L; 1,800 US gal); Q1/2: 2,000 imp gal (9,100 L; 2,400 US gal)
- Boiler pressure: 180 psi (1.2 MPa)
- Cylinders: Two outside
- Cylinder size: 19 in × 26 in (483 mm × 660 mm)
- Valve gear: Stephenson
Performance figures
- Tractive effort: 25,645 lbf (114.07 kN)
Career
- Operators: London and North Eastern Railway; → British Railways
- Class: Q1
- Power class: 5F
- Withdrawn: 1954–1959
- Disposition: All scrapped

The London and North Eastern Railway (LNER) Thompson Class Q1 was a class of 0-8-0T steam locomotives. They were rebuilds of the GCR Class 8A (LNER Class Q4) 0-8-0s. Thirteen were rebuilt between 1942 and 1945 at Gorton Works. All passed to British Railways in 1948, numbered 69925–69937.

== Overview ==
The locomotives had outside cylinders with inside valves and inside Stephenson valve gear. There were two variants:

- Q1/1 (69925-69928) with 1,500-imperial-gallon (6,800 L; 1,800 US gal) tanks
- Q1/2 (69929-69937) with 2,000-imperial-gallon (9,100 L; 2,400 US gal) tanks

The extra 500 imperial gallons (2,300 L; 600 US gal) of water in the Q1/2 was carried in the rear tank, under the coal bunker, resulting in a reduced coal capacity.

== Withdrawal ==
All the Class Q1 locomotives were withdrawn and scrapped from 1954 to 1959.
