= William Bragge =

English civil engineer, antiquarian and author

- Born: 31 May 1823; Birmingham, England, UK
- Died: 6 June 1884 (aged 61); Birmingham, England, UK
- Education: Birmingham
- Occupations: Civil engineer, antiquarian, author
- Known for: Bibliotheca nicotiana
- Title: F.S.A., F.G.S.

William Bragge, F.S.A., F.G.S., (31 May 1823 – 6 June 1884) was an English civil engineer, antiquarian and author. He established a museum and art gallery, and collected a notably comprehensive library of the literature on tobacco, in all its forms and almost all languages, with pamphlets, engravings and other publications filling 17 large volumes. The original and revised volumes constitute the earliest specialist bibliography in the English language.

== Early life and education ==
Bragge was born in Birmingham, where his father, Thomas Perry Bragg, was a jeweller. He had a brother, Joseph, six years younger. Bragge studied mechanics and mathematics in Birmingham, practical engineering with two firms in Birmingham, and trained as an engineer and railway surveyor.

== Career ==
He began his career in 1845 as a civil engineer and began railway surveying, first as an assistant engineer, later as Chief Mechanical Engineer with the Birkenhead Railway for a portion of the Chester to Holyhead railroad line.

With a recommendation from Sir Charles Fox, Bragge, representing Edward T. Belhouse & Co. of Manchester, was sent to Brazil where he worked on the project to light Rio de Janeiro with gas, as well as surveying the first railway in Brazil. For his fine work, Bragge received distinctions from the emperor Don Pedro II, including the Order of the Rose. Bragge built the first line that was hauled by the locomotive, La Porteña, on the Ferrocarril Oeste de Buenos Aires. In addition, he built gas and waterworks for the city of Buenos Aires. He was a founder of Argentina's Primitiva de Gas Company.

Bragge returned to England in 1858, and in Sheffield from 1858 to 1872 was a managing director of John Brown & Company. In 1870, he became Master Cutler of Sheffield. He established an armour-plate manufactory in Sheffield as well.

In 1872, Bragge went to Paris and was unsuccessful in developing a sewage system for Société des Engrais. Upon his return to Birmingham in 1876, he established a watch-making factory.

His memberships include:

- Free Libraries Committee
- School of Art
- Fellow, Society of Antiquaries
- Fellow, Anthropological Society
- Fellow, Royal Geographical Society

=== Antiquarian ===
In addition to South America, Bragge's travels took him to Russia and Bragge was a frequent visitor to Spain where he developed an interest in its literature, including that of Miguel de Cervantes.

Bragge donated his collected items to the Birmingham Free Library, including his 1,500-volume Cervantes collection in 1873 and study of tobacco collection. The fire of 1879 destroyed many items. He collected gems and precious stones from all over Europe, as well as 13,000 pipes, hundreds of types of tobacco, and snuff boxes. In 1880, Bragge published a revised bibliography of tobacco, Bibliotheca nicotiana, amounting to 248 quarto pages.

== Personal life ==
Bragge lived for a time on Shirley Hills, Birmingham. His wife, a sister of Rev. George Beddow, died before him. Bragge was blind for a period before his death at Clarendon House, Handsworth, Birmingham.

His descendants include a daughter, Mrs W. H. Haywood, who presented to the Birmingham Central Reference Library, Language and Literature Department, a marble profile medallion portrait of her father aged 42, sculpted by Edward William Wyon in 1865. He had three sons, Charles William Bragge (born in Chester), George Stephenson Bragge (born in Rio de Janeiro) and Frank John Bragge (born in Sheffield).

== Selected works ==
- Bragge, W. (1874). Bibliotheca nicotiana; a first catalogue of books about tobacco. Birmingham: Printed by J. Allen, Priv. print. OCLC 4590668.
- Bragge, W. (1880). Bibliotheca nicotiana; a catalogue of books about tobacco together with a catalogue of objects connected with the use of tobacco in all its forms. Birmingham: Priv. Print, Hudson and son. OCLC 14862346.
- Timmins, S.; Bragge, W. (1880). The pipes of all peoples. Birmingham: Hudson and Son, printers. OCLC 18064705.

== Sources ==
- "Bragge, William" . Dictionary of National Biography. London: Smith, Elder & Co. 1885–1900.
