= LNER Peppercorn Class A1 =

Class of British 4-6-2 locomotives

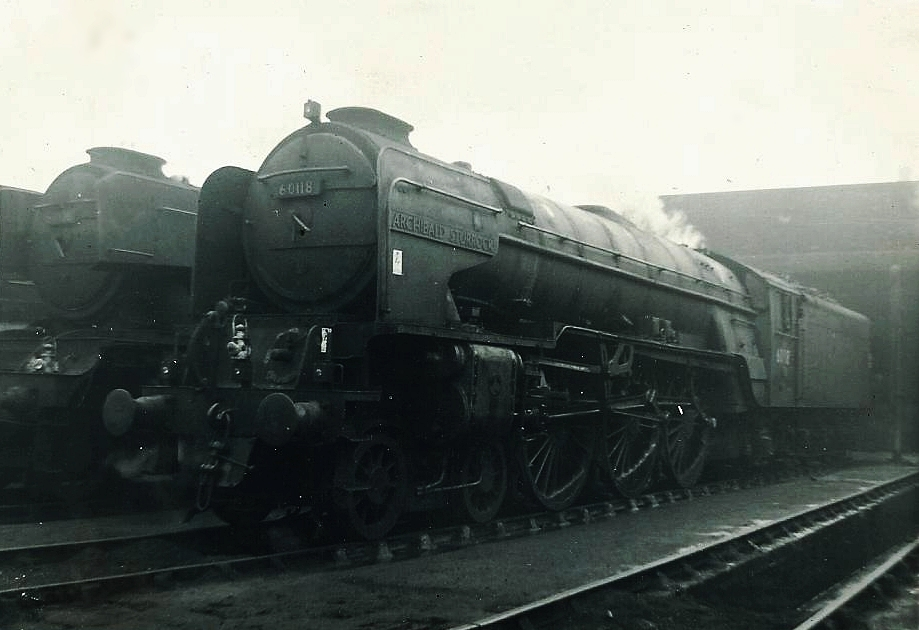
- A1 Class No. 60118 Archibald Sturrock at Kings Cross "Top Shed", circa May 1963
Type and origin
- Power type: Steam
- Designer: Arthur Peppercorn
- Builder: Doncaster Works; Darlington Works
- Build date: 1948–1949, 2008
- Total produced: 49
Specifications
- Configuration
  - Whyte: 4-6-2
- Leading dia.: 3 ft 2 in (0.965 m)
- Driver dia.: 6 ft 8 in (2.032 m)
- Trailing dia.: 3 ft 8 in (1.118 m)
- Length: 72 ft 11 3/4 in (22.24 m)
- Width: 9 ft 2 7/8 in (2.82 m)
- Height: 13 ft 1 in (3.99 m)
- Axle load: 22.1 long tons (22.5 t; 24.8 short tons)
- Adhesive weight: 66.55 long tons (67.62 t; 74.54 short tons)
- Loco weight: 105.2 long tons (106.9 t; 117.8 short tons)
- Tender weight: 60.9 long tons (61.9 t; 68.2 short tons)
- Total weight: 166.1 long tons (168.8 t; 186.0 short tons)
- Fuel type: Coal
- Fuel capacity: 9 long tons (9.1 t; 10 short tons)
- Water cap.: 5,000 imp gal (23,000 L; 6,000 US gal)
- Firebox
  - Grate area: 50.0 sq ft (4.65 m^{2})
- Boiler: Diagram 118; 6 ft 5 in (1.96 m) diameter 29 ft 2 in (8.89 m) length
- Boiler pressure: 250 psi (1,700 kPa)
- Heating surface
  - Firebox: 245.3 sq ft (22.79 m^{2})
  - Tubes: 1,211.6 sq ft (112.56 m^{2})
  - Flues: 1,004.5 sq ft (93.32 m^{2})
  - Total surface: 2,461.4 sq ft (228.67 m^{2})
- Superheater
  - Heating area: 697.7 sq ft (64.82 m^{2})
- Cylinders: Three
- Cylinder size: 19 in × 26 in (483 mm × 660 mm)
- Valve gear: Walschaerts
Performance figures
- Maximum speed: 100 mph (160 km/h)
- Power output: 2,700 hp (2,000 kW)
- Tractive effort: 37,400 lbf (166 kN)
Career
- Operators: British Railways
- Power class: BR: 8P6F
- Number in class: 49 original, 1 completed in 2008
- Numbers: 60114–60162, 60163
- Locale: North Eastern Region
- First run: August 1948
- Last run: June 1966
- Withdrawn: October 1962–June 1966
- Disposition: Original 49 withdrawn and scrapped, 1 built in 2008 and Mainline Registered

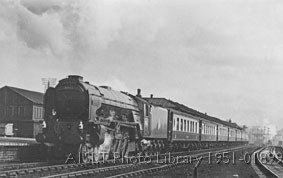
60133 Pommern passing Leeds-Holbeck High Level Station hauling Leeds Central to Kings Cross Yorkshire Pullman

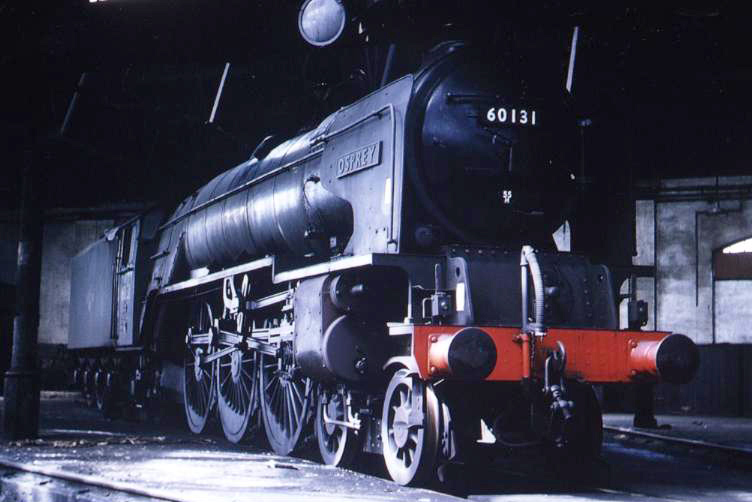
60131 Osprey at Leeds Neville Hill locomotive shed on 18 April 1965

London and North Eastern Railway's (LNER) Peppercorn Class A1 is a class of 4-6-2 "Pacific" steam locomotives largely built between 1948 and 1949 at Doncaster and Darlington Works to a design of Arthur Peppercorn. Forty-nine were built for hauling express passenger services on the East Coast Main Line owned by LNER's successor, British Railways' North Eastern Region. None of the original 49 Peppercorn A1s survived into preservation, with the last being scrapped in 1966. The 50th Peppercorn A1, 60163 Tornado, was completed in 2008 as an evolved member of its class.

== Background ==
Most of the former LNER Class A1 locomotives designed by Sir Nigel Gresley had been rebuilt as LNER Class A3 locomotives prior to this class being conceived. The few straggling LNER Class A1 locomotives that remained unrebuilt during the tenure of Peppercorn's predecessor, Edward Thompson, were redesignated by him as Class A10s in preparation for the construction of his new Class A1 locomotives. Thompson rebuilt the pioneer LNER Pacific Great Northern in 1945; originally this was the new Class A1, but the rebuild was not repeated. Instead, initiated by Thompson but largely taken forward by his successor Arthur Peppercorn, Great Northern was designated Class A1/1, and a new class of Peppercorn A1s ordered.

The locomotives were designed to cope with the heaviest passenger trains in the post-war period on the East Coast Main Line (London – York – Newcastle – Edinburgh – Aberdeen) which consisted normally of trains with up to 15 coaches and up to 550 long tons (560 t; 620 short tons). The Peppercorn A1s were able to pull such a train on the flat at a speed of 60–70 mph (97–113 km/h). The class used a double Kylchap chimney system and, like previous LNER Pacifics, had a 3-cylinder arrangement.

== Original locomotives ==
=== Construction ===
The new A1s were ordered by the LNER but were delivered after the LNER had been nationalised to form part of British Railways at the start of 1948. The 49 engines were built at the Eastern Region's Doncaster and Darlington works between 1948 and 1949.

Construction details
Nos	Date built	Works	Order no.	Notes
60114-22	1948	Doncaster	382	
60123	1949	Doncaster	382	
60124-9	1949	Doncaster	383	
60130-43	1948	Darlington	—	
60144-52	1949	Darlington	—	
60153-7	1949	Doncaster	388	Built with Timken roller bearings on all axles
60158-62	1949	Doncaster	388	

=== Withdrawal ===
By summer of 1966, all 49 class members had gone for scrap. The last to be withdrawn from stock was No. 60145 Saint Mungo, after a working life of just 17 years. 60145 Saint Mungo was planned to be preserved by Geoff Drury; however, this ultimately was unsuccessful and none of the original locomotives were preserved.

Year	Quantity in service at start of year	Quantity withdrawn	Locomotive numbers	Notes
1962	49	6	60115/22–23/35/37/53	
1963	43	6	60136/44/59–62	
1964	37	11	60114/19–20/25/39/41/43/47/49–50/58	
1965	26	24	60116–18/21/26–34/38/40/42/46/48/51–52/54–57	
1966	2	2	60124/45	60145 was subject to preservation attempt.

=== List of original locomotives ===
Below is a list of original Peppercorn A1 Locomotives

No.	Name	Built	Works	Withdrawn	Notes
60114	W. P. Allen	August 1948	Doncaster	December 1964	
60115	Meg Merrilies	September 1948	Doncaster	November 1962	
60116	Hal o' the Wynd	October 1948	Doncaster	June 1965	
60117	Bois Roussel	October 1948	Doncaster	June 1965	
60118	Archibald Sturrock	November 1948	Doncaster	October 1965	
60119	Patrick Stirling	November 1948	Doncaster	May 1964	
60120	Kittiwake	December 1948	Doncaster	January 1964	
60121	Silurian	December 1948	Doncaster	October 1965	
60122	Curlew	December 1948	Doncaster	December 1962	
60123	H.A. Ivatt	February 1949	Doncaster	October 1962	
60124	Kenilworth	March 1949	Doncaster	March 1966	
60125	Scottish Union	April 1949	Doncaster	July 1964	
60126	Sir Vincent Raven	April 1949	Doncaster	January 1965	
60127	Wilson Worsdell	May 1949	Doncaster	June 1965	
60128	Bongrace	May 1949	Doncaster	January 1965	
60129	Guy Mannering	June 1949	Doncaster	October 1965	
60130	Kestrel	September 1948	Darlington	October 1965	
60131	Osprey	October 1948	Darlington	October 1965	
60132	Marmion	October 1948	Darlington	June 1965	
60133	Pommern	October 1948	Darlington	June 1965	
60134	Foxhunter	November 1948	Darlington	October 1965	
60135	Madge Wildfire	November 1948	Darlington	November 1962	
60136	Alcazar	November 1948	Darlington	May 1963	
60137	Redgauntlet	December 1948	Darlington	October 1962	
60138	Boswell	December 1948	Darlington	October 1965	
60139	Sea Eagle	December 1948	Darlington	June 1964	
60140	Balmoral	December 1948	Darlington	January 1965	
60141	Abbotsford	December 1948	Darlington	October 1964	
60142	Edward Fletcher	February 1949	Darlington	June 1965	
60143	Sir Walter Scott	February 1949	Darlington	May 1964	
60144	King's Courier	March 1949	Darlington	April 1963	
60145	Saint Mungo	March 1949	Darlington	June 1966	Preservation attempt failed
60146	Peregrine	April 1949	Darlington	October 1965	
60147	North Eastern	April 1949	Darlington	August 1964	
60148	Aboyeur	May 1949	Darlington	June 1965	
60149	Amadis	May 1949	Darlington	June 1964	
60150	Willbrook	June 1949	Darlington	October 1964	
60151	Midlothian	June 1949	Darlington	November 1965	
60152	Holyrood	July 1949	Darlington	June 1965	
60153	Flamboyant	August 1949	Doncaster	November 1962	
60154	Bon Accord	September 1949	Doncaster	October 1965	
60155	Borderer	September 1949	Doncaster	October 1965	
60156	Great Central	October 1949	Doncaster	May 1965	
60157	Great Eastern	November 1949	Doncaster	January 1965	
60158	Aberdonian	November 1949	Doncaster	December 1964	
60159	Bonnie Dundee	November 1949	Doncaster	October 1963	
60160	Auld Reekie	December 1949	Doncaster	December 1963	
60161	North British	December 1949	Doncaster	October 1963	
60162	Saint Johnstoun	December 1949	Doncaster	October 1963	

=== Notes on names ===
The names of the A1s were an eclectic mix including:

- Racehorses: Bois Roussel, Silurian, Scottish Union, Bongrace, Pommern, Foxhunter, Alcazar, Boswell, King's Courier, Aboyeur, Amadis, Willbrook, Flamboyant
- Names of people: W. P. Allen (an LNER locomotive driver who became a member of the Railway Executive in 1948), Archibald Sturrock, Patrick Stirling, H. A. Ivatt, Sir Vincent Raven, Wilson Worsdell, Edward Fletcher (Locomotive Superintendents of pre-grouping railways), Sir Walter Scott, Saint Mungo
- Names related to the works of Sir Walter Scott: Meg Merrilies, Hal o’ the Wynd, Kenilworth, Guy Mannering, Marmion, Borderer, Madge Wildfire, Redgauntlet, Bonnie Dundee. Some of these names had previously been used on NBR J class locomotives
- Pre-grouping railway companies: North Eastern, Great Central, Great Eastern, North British
- Birds: Kittiwake, Curlew, Kestrel, Osprey, Sea Eagle, Peregrine. Some of these names had previously been used on LNER Class A4 locomotives.
- Place-related names: Balmoral, Abbotsford (Sir Walter Scott's house), Midlothian, Holyrood, Bon Accord (motto of Aberdeen), Auld Reekie (a soubriquet for Edinburgh), Saint Johnstoun (an old name for Perth), Aberdonian

== No. 60163 Tornado ==
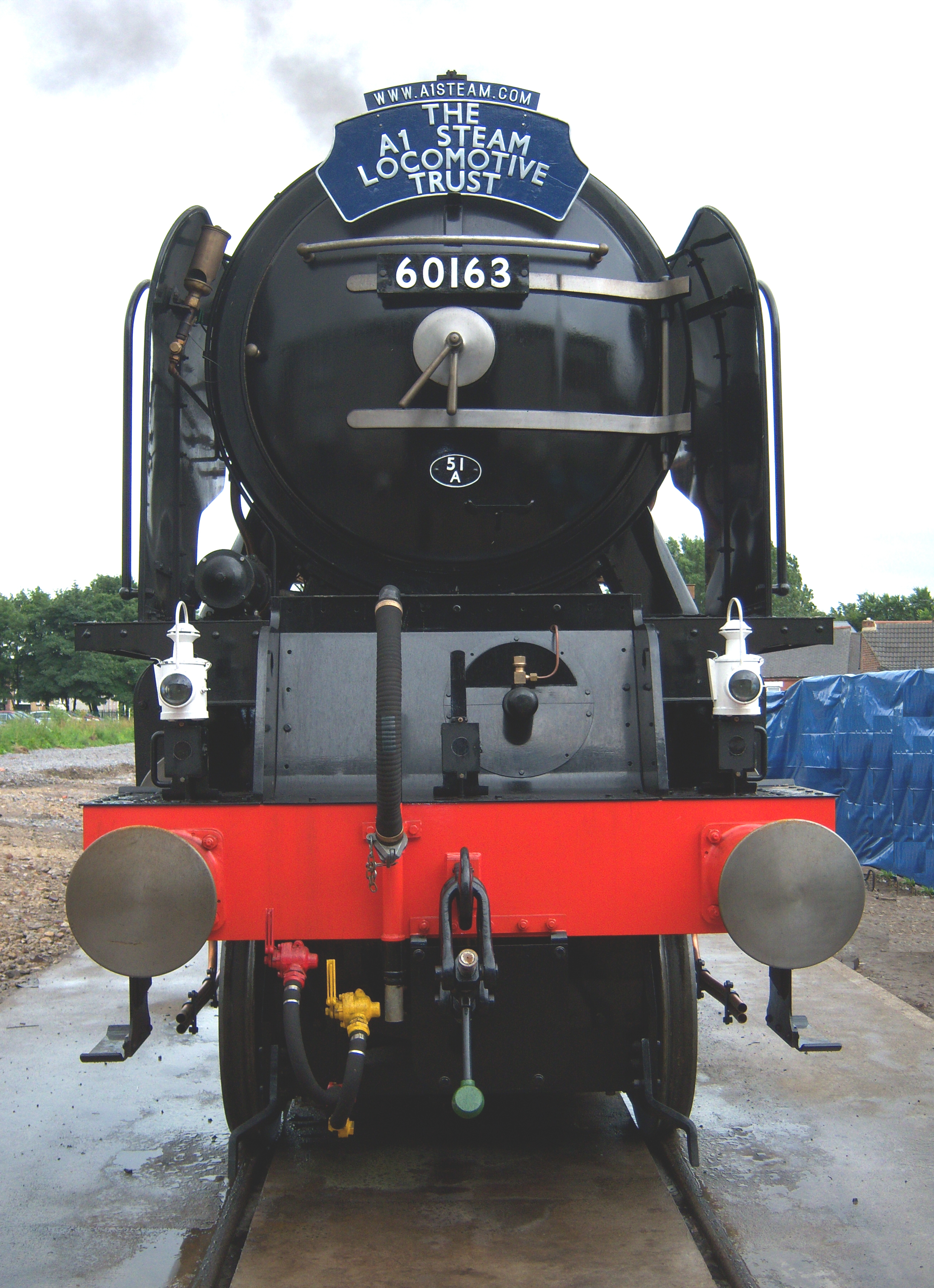
60163 Tornado, August 2008, Darlington

None of the original production run of 49 Peppercorn A1s survived the scrapyard to be preserved. However, in July 2008, a brand new 50th A1 Pacific based on the original Peppercorn patterns, 60163 Tornado, was completed as the evolved member of the class.

== Accidents and incidents ==
- On 5 June 1950, locomotive No. 60153 Flamboyant was hauling an express passenger train which was derailed at Tollerton, North Yorkshire due to heat buckled track.
- On 7 September 1962, No. 60123 H.A. Ivatt suffered harsh collision damage after running into a train at Offord. Four people were injured in the incident. It was withdrawn a month later and scrapped at Doncaster.
- On 16 January 1964, No. 60120 Kittiwake collided with the rear end of a goods train in North Otterington. It was withdrawn shortly after the incident.
- On 14 April 2018, locomotive No. 60163 Tornado was hauling an excursion train named "The Ebor Flyer" from London King's Cross to York. While traveling at 90mph around Sandy, south of Peterborough, the locomotive's inside motion failed.

== Models ==
Bachmann Branchline and Hornby make models in OO gauge, Graham Farish produce a model in N gauge and Accucraft (UK) make a live steam model in Gauge 1.
