= LNER Peppercorn Class A2 =

Class of 15 British 4-6-2 locomotives

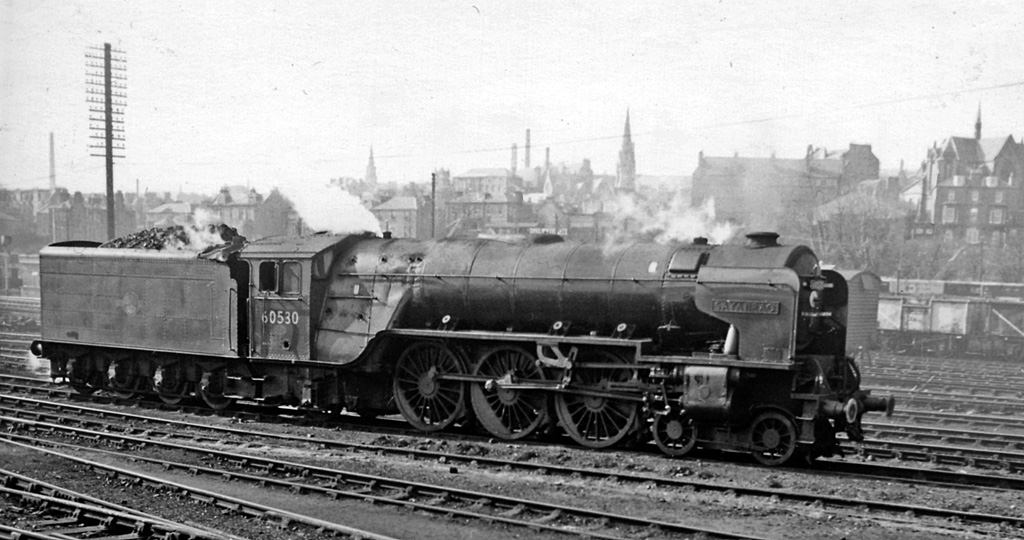
- 60530 Sayajirao at Dundee Tay Bridge in April 1966
Type and origin
- Power type: Steam
- Designer: Arthur Peppercorn
- Builder: Doncaster Works
- Build date: 1947–1948
- Total produced: 15
Specifications
- Configuration
  - Whyte: 4-6-2
  - UIC: 2′C1′ h3
- Gauge: 4 ft 8 1/2 in (1,435 mm)
- Leading dia.: 3 ft 2 in (0.965 m)
- Driver dia.: 6 ft 2 in (1.880 m)
- Trailing dia.: 3 ft 8 in (1.118 m)
- Wheelbase: 60 ft 6 in (18.44 m)
  - Engine: 34 ft 4 in (10.46 m)
  - Coupled: 13 ft 0 in (3.96 m)
- Length: 71 ft 0.5 in (21.654 m)
- Axle load: 22 long tons (22.4 t; 24.6 short tons)
- Loco weight: 101 long tons (102.6 t; 113.1 short tons)
- Total weight: 160.5 long tons (163.1 t; 179.8 short tons)
- Fuel type: Coal
- Fuel capacity: 9 long tons (9.1 t; 10.1 short tons)
- Water cap.: 5,000 imp gal (23,000 L; 6,000 US gal)
- Firebox
  - Grate area: 50 sq ft (4.6 m^{2})
- Boiler pressure: 250 psi (1.72 MPa)
- Heating surface
  - Firebox: 245 sq ft (22.8 m^{2})
  - Tubes: 1,212 sq ft (112.6 m^{2})
  - Flues: 1,005 sq ft (93.4 m^{2})
  - Total surface: 2,461 sq ft (228.6 m^{2})
- Superheater
  - Heating area: 680 sq ft (63 m^{2})
- Cylinders: Three
- Cylinder size: 19 in × 26 in (483 mm × 660 mm)
- Valve gear: Walschaerts
- Valve type: Piston valves
Performance figures
- Tractive effort: 40,430 lbf (179.84 kN)
Career
- Operators: London and North Eastern Railway » British Railways
- Class: LNER: A2
- Power class: BR: 8P7F
- Axle load class: Route Availability 9
- Withdrawn: November 1962 - June 1963, April 1965 - December 1966
- Disposition: One preserved; remainder scrapped

The London and North Eastern Railway (LNER) Peppercorn Class A2 is a class of steam locomotive designed for mixed-traffic work by Arthur Peppercorn, the chief designer of the LNER after Edward Thompson. All save the first of the 15 built were constructed under British Railways after nationalisation in 1948. Only one example is preserved.

== Design ==
The A2s were a development on the 6 ft 2 in (1.88 m) driving wheel locomotives of Peppercorn's predecessor, Edward Thompson. Thompson's designs were rebuilds of pre-existing Gresley designs, in addition to being constrained by wartime pressures. With a dilapidated locomotive and rolling stock fleet, Peppercorn designed his A2s to augment Thompson's designs and replace the aging Gresley locomotives.

Peppercorn's design was influenced greatly by Thompson's A2/3 design, although his design differed most obviously with the less stretched look. This was achieved by moving the outside cylinders forward over the leading truck and amending the steam ducts, shortening the smokebox and wheelbase while retaining the same cylinder and valve gear arrangement. However, this came at the cost of either discarding the Kylchap exhaust or the self-cleaning device in the smokebox, of which the former was omitted by the design team. A new smoke deflector design was fitted, although the omission of the Kylchap exhaust led to visibility issues during service. Some Gresley styled features returned in the form of the V-shaped cab and the 'Banjo Dome' steam collector. Most of the design was the same as the Thompson A2/3, utilising the same 250 psi (1.72 MPa) boiler, 50 ft^{2} (4.6 m^{2}) grate, a total heating surface of 3,141.04 ft^{2} (291.812 m^{2}) powering three 19 by 26 in (480 by 660 mm) cylinders, controlled from an electrically lit cab. This gave a tractive effort of 40,430 lbf (179.8 kN) with a maximum axle load of 22 t (21.7 long tons; 24.3 short tons). The boiler used a small amount of nickel plate for the barrel, saving .35 long tons (0.36 t; 0.39 short tons) without compromising integrity.

== Construction ==
The first of the Peppercorn A2s, No. 525 A.H.Peppercorn, was outshopped from Doncaster in December 1947 on the eve of nationalisation, and named after the designer of the class, Arthur Peppercorn. The first two of the class were turned out in LNER apple green livery, and this colour was also applied to the next 13 engines delivered between January and August 1948. Repainting in British Railways Brunswick green began the following year. Another 20 members of the class were also planned, but were put on hold and ultimately cancelled on 4 May 1948 after the 1948 Locomotive Exchanges. No. 60539 Bronzino emerged in August 1948 with Kylchap double blastpipe and chimney in place of the self-cleaning apparatus as an experiment, with Nos. 60526, 60529, 60532, 60533 and 60538 similarly modified in 1949.

LNER 1946 Nos	BR Nos	Year
525	60525	1947
526–531	60526–31	1948
	60532–39	1948

== Performance ==
The class's 50 sq ft grate, a remnant of the P2 lineage (from both Thompson and Peppercorn) boilers, meant the A2's were capable of high power and endurance; however, with the exception of the Aberdeen road, there was little need for this large grate firebox in the postwar era, and as a result, on comparable duties the A2's were heavier on fuel than the Gresley machines which pre-dated them, but for outright power and haulage capability, they were the logical successor to the P2 class, and finally provided the answer the Edinburgh-Aberdeen route required. As a result, they were amongst the last multi-cylindered express steam locomotive classes to remain in service in the UK.

== Stock list ==
Only No. 525 was built during LNER ownership, but 526-31 received LNER 1946 numbers. From 60532 onwards, the A2s received BR numbers from new, BR numbers being the LNER 1946 numbers with the addition of 60,000. With the exception of No. 525, named after the last Chief Mechanical Engineer of the LNER, they were named after racehorses.

LNER No.	BR No.	Name	Entered service	Withdrawn
525	60525	A. H. Peppercorn	December 1947	March 1963
526	60526	Sugar Palm	January 1948	November 1962
527	60527	Sun Chariot	January 1948	April 1965
528	60528	Tudor Minstrel	February 1948	June 1966
529	60529	Pearl Diver	February 1948	December 1962
530	60530	Sayajirao	March 1948	November 1966
531	60531	Bahram	March 1948	December 1962
-	60532	Blue Peter	March 1948	December 1966
-	60533	Happy Knight	April 1948	June 1963
-	60534	Irish Elegance	April 1948	December 1962
-	60535	Hornets Beauty	May 1948	June 1965
-	60536	Trimbush	May 1948	December 1962
-	60537	Bachelors Button	June 1948	December 1962
-	60538	Velocity	June 1948	November 1962
-	60539	Bronzino	August 1948	November 1962

== Service ==
Initially, the A2s were based at depots the length of the East Coast Main Line, ranging from New England (Peterborough) in the south to Edinburgh's Haymarket. It is said that Edinburgh Haymarket and Aberdeen Ferryhill shed welcomed the engines in stark comparison to the Thompson A2/2 and A1/1. In 1949, five were put to work on the Edinburgh-Dundee-Aberdeen route and proved the ideal engines for its stiff gradients and sharp curvature. The A2s also worked to Perth, Glasgow, Carlisle, Newcastle upon Tyne and occasionally more southerly outposts. In 1963, Nos. 60525, 60530, and 60535 crossed the LNER-LMS divide and were allocated to a Glasgow depot, Polmadie. They replaced ex-LMS Coronation Class over the ex-Caledonian Railway route to Carlisle.

The final years of the A2s came in eastern Scotland with many notable performances over the Aberdeen road during the early 1960s. No. 60527 Sun Chariot started from Aberdeen with a 400-ton train and reached Montrose, Arbroath and Dundee ahead of schedule. In 1961 on Stoke bank in Lincolnshire, the location of Mallard's 1938 world speed record, No. 60526 Sugar Palm achieved 101 mph (163 km/h) with the up West Riding express. Withdrawals began in the following year. Neither 60526 Sugar Palm or No. 60525 A. H. Peppercorn were saved for preservation.

== Withdrawal ==
Withdrawal in England occurred during 1962 and 1963. Withdrawal in Scotland was completed in 1966. The last three engines - 60528 Tudor Minstrel, 60530 Sayajirao and 60532 Blue Peter - were retired in June 1966.

Year	Quantity in service at start of year	Quantity withdrawn	Locomotive numbers	Notes
1962	15	8	60526/29/31/34/36–39	
1963	7	2	60525/33	
1964	5	0	—	
1965	5	2	60527/35	
1966	3	3	60528/30/32	No. 60532 preserved.

== Preservation ==
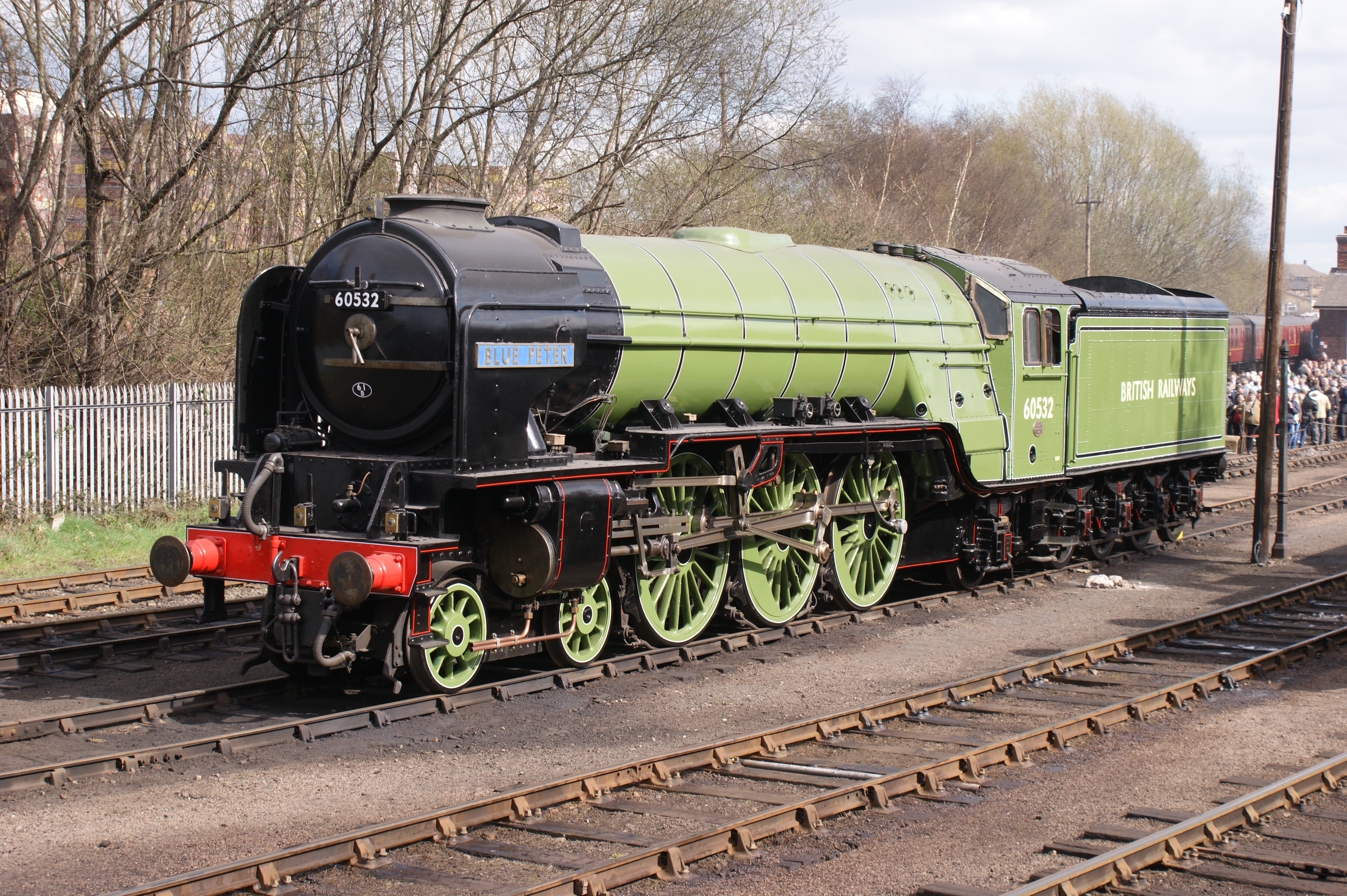
60532 Blue Peter, as preserved.

One Peppercorn A2, 60532 Blue Peter, has survived.

== See also ==
- LNER Thompson Class A2
- LNER Class A2

== Sources ==
- Allen, Cecil J. (1962). British Pacific Locomotives.
- Boddy, M. G.; Neve, E.; Yeadon, W. B. (April 1973). Fry, E. V. (ed.). Locomotives of the L.N.E.R., Part 2A: Tender Engines—Classes A1 to A10. Kenilworth: RCTS. ISBN 0-901115-25-8.
- Hillier-Graves, Tim (2021). Peppercorn, His Life & Locomotives. Pen & Sword Books.
- Yeadon, W. B. (1991). Yeadon's Register of LNER Locomotives, Volume 3: Raven, Thompson & Peppercorn Pacifics. Irwell Press.
