= Arthur Peppercorn =

English railway engineer (1889–1951)

Arthur Henry Peppercorn OBE
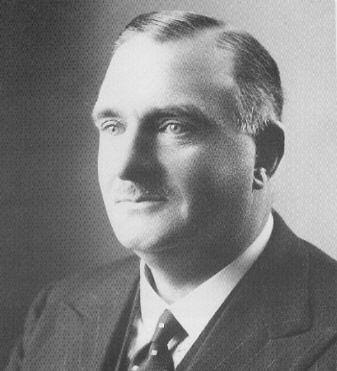
- Born: 29 January 1889; Leominster
- Died: 3 March 1951 (aged 62); Doncaster
- Education: Hereford Cathedral School
- Engineering career
- Discipline: Locomotive engineer

Arthur Henry Peppercorn, OBE (29 January 1889 – 3 March 1951) was an English railway engineer, and was the last Chief Mechanical Engineer (CME) of the London and North Eastern Railway.

== Career ==
Arthur Peppercorn was born in Leominster in 1889 and educated at Hereford Cathedral School. In 1905 he started his career as an apprentice with the Great Northern Railway (GNR) at Doncaster. Then CME Nigel Gresley took a liking to the young apprentice and would supervise his career; in turn, Peppercorn was devoted to Gresley, and would in time be treated almost like one of the family.

Gresley's sudden death in 1941 was a shock to all in the LNER, and although Peppercorn was considered for the role, his great modesty in comparison with that of the other candidate, Edward Thompson, as well as the influence Thompson held within the LNER seniority meant that it was Thompson who succeeded Gresley. Thompson was already 60 years old, and both he and the LNER recognised that his appointment was not a permanent solution: both Peppercorn and Harrison were ready in the wings.

When Peppercorn did succeed Thompson as CME on 1 July 1946, his style of work proved to be very different from that of his predecessor. Peppercorn was recognised as an amiable and very well liked man, though despite his popularity, he remained very modest and humble. He believed the job was above him, but in truth he possessed much of the outstanding ability of his mentor Sir Nigel Gresley. He could see beyond the limitations of the Gresley conjugated valve gear and the flaws surrounding the Thompson locomotives. Peppercorn finished several projects which were started by Thompson and cancelled others. He revised the K1/1 design to build a batch of 70 class K1s, continued the building of the B1s, and halted further rebuilding of the A10 class into A1/1 specification. His most significant mark on railway history must be his LNER Peppercorn Class A1 and the LNER Peppercorn Class A2.

Peppercorn died in 1951 in Doncaster.

=== Locomotives ===
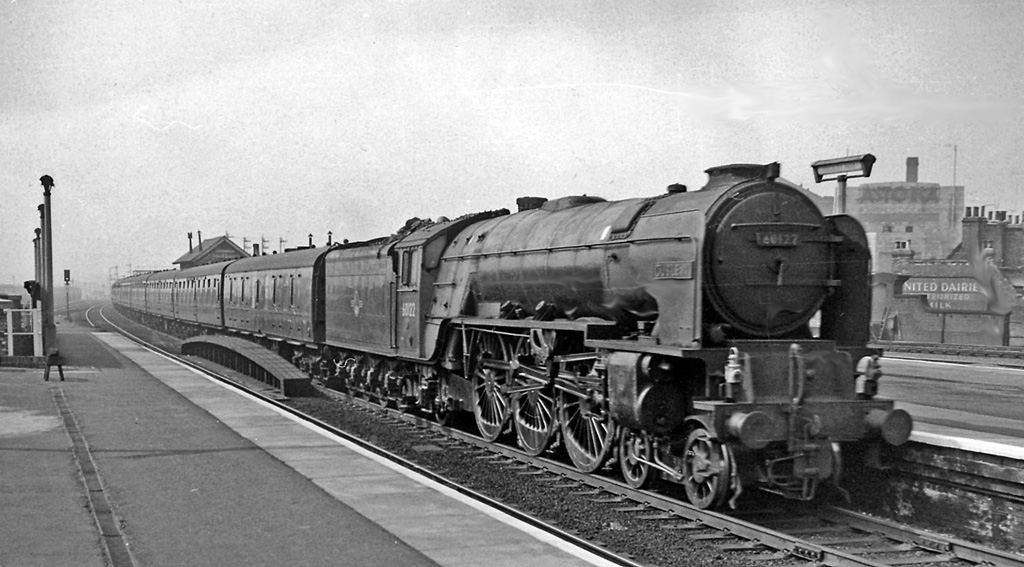
A1 Pacific No. 60122 Curlew hauls a King's Cross-bound express through Finsbury Park station in April 1962.

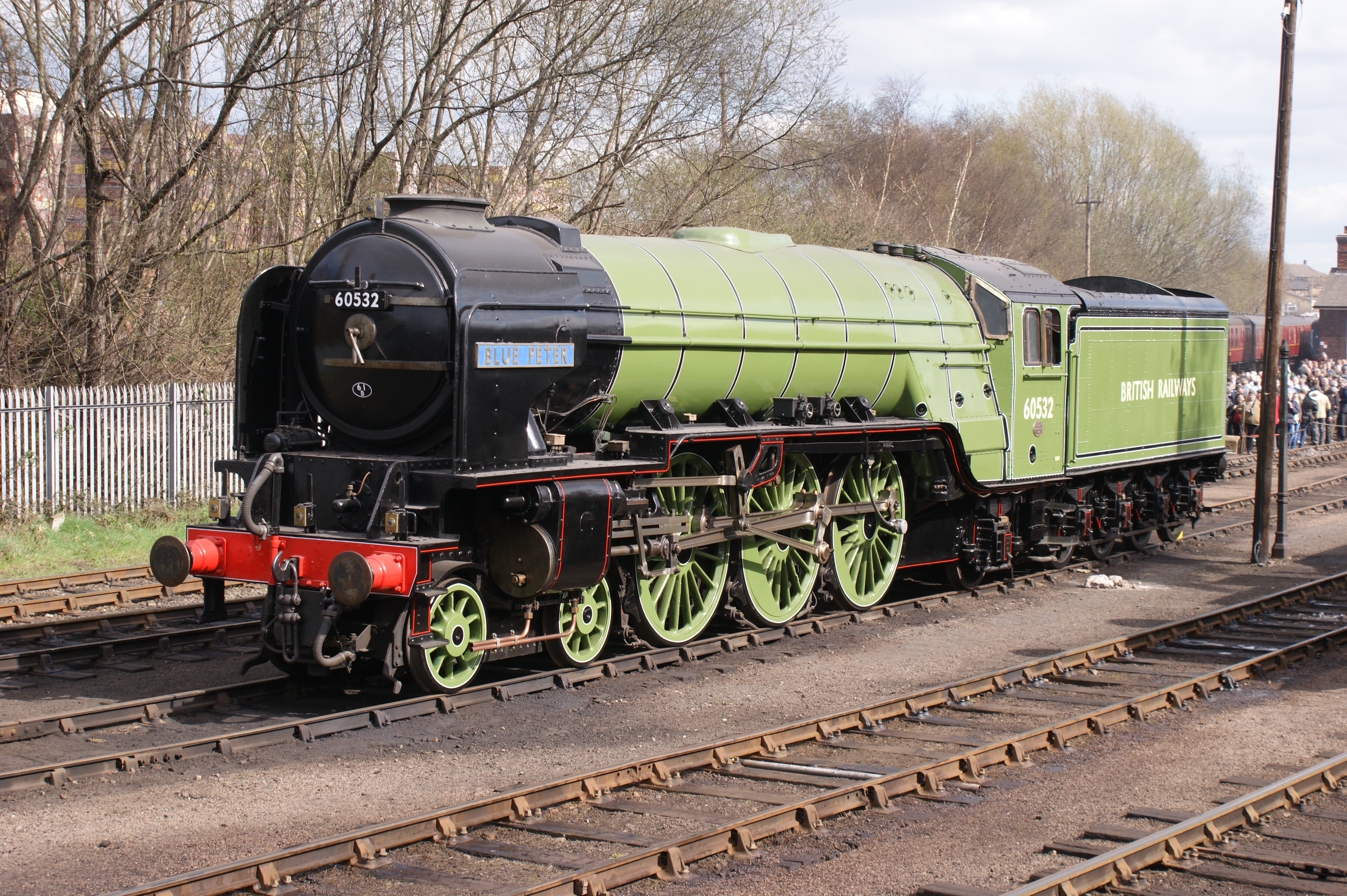
LNER Peppercorn Class A2 Blue Peter

Edward Thompson had set down strict guidelines for the incoming CME, relating directly to the upcoming design of an Express Passenger Pacific. The design was to draw heavily on the A1/1 Pacific Great Northern which had been rebuilt during Thompson's time in office. This would have created a cross between the A2/3 Pacifics, and Great Northern's 6 ft 8 in driving wheels. By the time Peppercorn was in office, reports of Great Northern's persistent frame problems, hot axleboxes and steam leaks were all filtering back into the design office. The belief was that the problems were caused by a lack of frame support at the front end, largely due to the cylinders not being aligned with each other (an aspect of divided drive combined with equal length connecting rods). Thompson's guidelines would have produced another locomotive with the cylinders apart, so Peppercorn decided against it, and brought the cylinders in line, and arranged the locomotive as something of a merging of both Gresley's A4 and Thompson's A2/1, creating first the A2 class, and then the A1.

Both of the Peppercorn Pacifics used a boiler incorporating a 50 sq ft grate, allowing for very high power levels to be produced, but at the cost of a relatively high fuel consumption. A consequence was that although both the A1 and A2 classes were regarded as excellent locomotives they were not especially popular with those who had to fire them. Previous Gresley Pacifics on the LNER had a 41.25 sq ft grate, which had proved sufficient for any tasks not needing very high power output. The P2s had been built with 50 sq ft grates, which were able to supply large quantities of steam for long periods, but had proved too big for the purpose: the fireman had to feed vast amounts of coal just to keep the grate covered, where a smaller grate would have sufficed. The P2 boiler was carried over to the Thompson Pacifics (because the first were rebuilds of P2s) and then on to the Peppercorn Pacifics. At the time these classes were built however, the trainloads of WW2 were massive in comparison to those for which the Gresley Pacifics had been designed and built, and both Peppercorn and Thompson had to design engines which could meet that requirement: heavier fuel consumption on lighter duties was a compromise which was needed in order to meet the higher demands of the day.

Despite the fuel consumption concerns, in addressing the limitations of both the Thompson Pacifics and those of Gresley, Peppercorn had produced engines which could master virtually all the work put to them without the drawbacks of centre big-end bearing overheat, leaking steam pipe connections, frame fractures or any of the other flaws which blighted the previous LNER Pacifics. The A1s were intended to take over from the A4s on non-stop express duties, but the low fuel consumption of the A4s meant that the A1s failed to dent their monopoly on the non-stop expresses. After post-war frame alignment and fitting of double Kylchap blastpipes, the A4s became once more the standard-bearer of the East Coast Main Line. For the second tier LNER Expresses however, the A1s proved to be an excellent design.

The real strength of the A1 and A2 classes lay in their reliability. By carefully incorporating the best of Gresley and Thompson design, as well as ideas of his own, Peppercorn had produced two masterpieces of durability and low service cost. Five of the A1s had roller bearings fitted throughout, and they regularly covered 150,000 miles between intermediate overhauls. Even the plain bearing A1s were capable of 90,000 miles between overhauls, and no other express passenger locomotive class in the UK could do more than 80,000. The first of his A2 engines had single chimneys, and when fitted with self-cleaning smoke-boxes experienced steaming problems which took some time to resolve. Changing to double blast-pipe resolved much of the issues, though some of the A2s retained single chimney without self-cleaning apparatus. The A1s, being built afterwards, and incorporating the lessons learned, featured the double blast-pipe and chimney from new.

These were known as some of the best British steam locomotives ever in service. The A2s were particularly powerful, and finally produced the answer to the heavy services on the Edinburgh to Aberdeen Line which had blighted both Gresley (P2 Class- too long a rigid wheelbase) and Thompson (A2/2 and A2/3- both lacking adhesion). Upon nationalisation and the creation of British Railways, Peppercorn continued in essentially the same job, now titled "Chief Mechanical Engineer, Eastern and North Eastern Regions". He retired at the end of 1949, one year after nationalisation: he was Chief Mechanical Engineer for three and a half years.

== Legacy ==
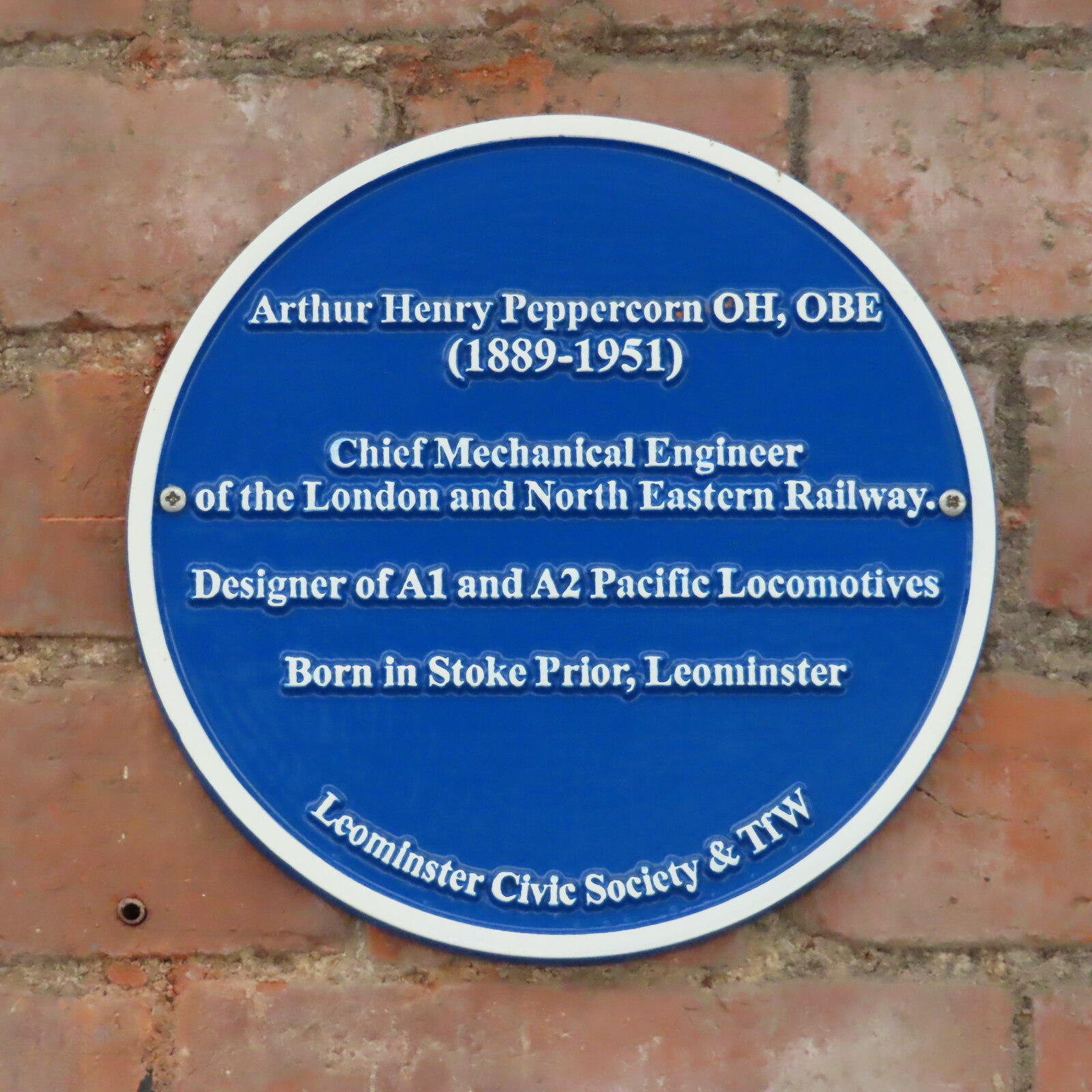
Plaque in Leominster

K1 locomotive No. 62005 was preserved by NELPG, though originally to provide spares for No. 61994 The Great Marquess. 62005 was eventually rebuilt in its own right, and has seen regular active main line service for the last 40 years.

Only one of his famous Pacific locomotives, an A2, 60532 Blue Peter, was preserved.

No A1s were preserved. However, a brand new example, 60163 Tornado, was built as the next in the class. It moved under its own steam for the first time in August 2008.

Arthur Peppercorn's widow, Dorothy Mather, was honorary president of the A1 Steam Locomotive Trust, builder of Tornado, from the early 1990s until her death in 2015. At age 92, she lit the first fire in Tornado's firebox in January 2008, and was later on the footplate for Tornado's inaugural steaming at Darlington works, stating "My husband would be proud."

Business positions
Preceded by Edward Thompson	Chief Mechanical Engineer of the London and North Eastern Railway; 1946–1947	Succeeded by British Railways
