= LNER Class O4 =

Class of British 2-8-0 locomotives

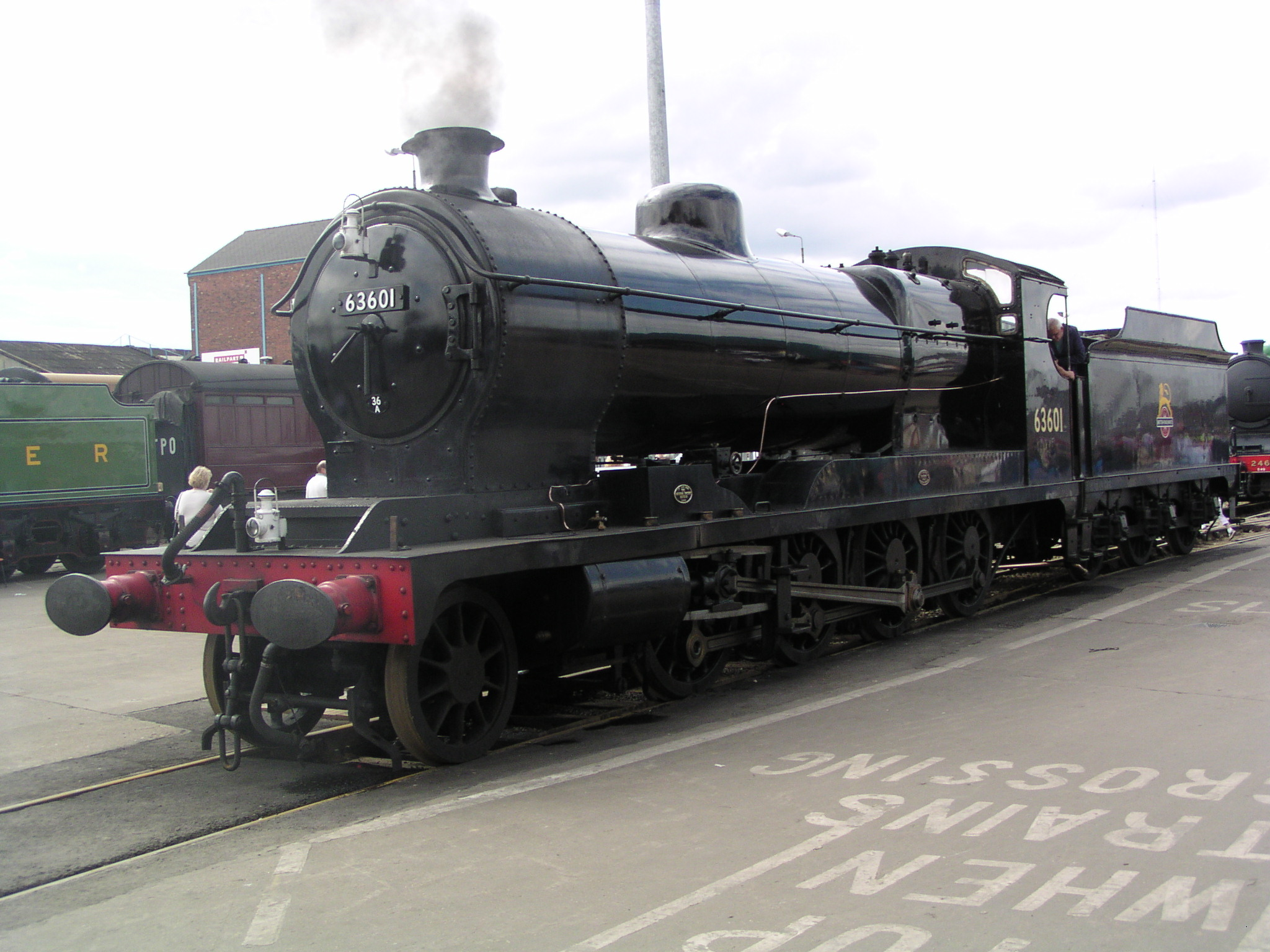
- Preserved No. 63601 at Doncaster Works.
Type and origin
- Power type: Steam
- Designer: John G. Robinson
- Build date: 1911–1918
- Total produced: 421
Specifications
- Configuration
  - Whyte: 2-8-0
  - UIC: 1′D h2
- Gauge: 4 ft 8 1/2 in (1,435 mm) standard gauge
- Leading dia.: 3 ft 6 in (1,067 mm)
- Driver dia.: 4 ft 8 in (1,422 mm)
- Tender wheels: 4 ft 4 in (1,321 mm)
- Wheelbase: 51 ft 2.5 in (15.608 m)
  - Engine: 25 ft 5 in (7.75 m)
  - Tender: 13 ft (4.0 m)
- Length: 61 ft 8.5 in (18.809 m)
- Loco weight: 72.5–74.65 long tons (73.66–75.85 t; 81.20–83.61 short tons)
- Fuel type: Coal
- Fuel capacity: 6 long tons 0 cwt (13,400 lb or 6.1 t)
- Water cap.: 4,000 imp gal (18,000 L; 4,800 US gal)
- Firebox
  - Type: Belpaire (some engines were fitted with round top fireboxes when the GCR was grouped into the LNER)
  - Grate area: 26.24 sq ft (2.438 m^{2})
- Boiler
  - Tube plates: 15 ft (4,600 mm)
- Boiler pressure: 180 psi (1.24 MPa)
- Heating surface
  - Firebox: 153 sq ft (14.2 m^{2})
  - Tubes: 1,348 sq ft (125.2 m^{2})
  - Total surface: 1,756 sq ft (163.1 m^{2})
- Superheater
  - Type: Robinson
  - Heating area: 225 sq ft (20.9 m^{2})
- Cylinders: Two, outside
- Cylinder size: 21 in × 26 in (533 mm × 660 mm)
- Valve gear: Stephenson
- Valve type: Piston valves
Performance figures
- Tractive effort: 31,325 lbf (139.34 kN)
Career
- Operators: Great Central Railway; Railway Operating Division; London and North Eastern Railway; British Railways
- Class: GCR: 8K; LNER: O4
- Power class: BR: 7F
- Numbers: LNER (from 1946): 3500–3920; BR: 63570–63920
- Axle load class: LNER/BR: Route Availability 6
- Withdrawn: December 1958 - April 1966
- Disposition: One preserved, remainder scrapped

The London and North Eastern Railway (LNER) Class O4 initially consisted of the 131 ex-Great Central Railway (GCR) Class 8K 2-8-0 steam locomotives acquired on grouping in 1923. The engines were designed by John G. Robinson and built at the GCR's Gorton Locomotive Works, Manchester.

== O4 History post 1923 ==
The O4s were added to when the LNER purchased 273 ex-Railway Operating Division ROD 2-8-0s to the same design between 1923 and 1927. Meanwhile, the 19 GCR Class 8M (LNER Class O5) were rebuilt as O4 standard during the 1920s and 1930s. 92 O4 locomotives were requisitioned by the War Department during World War II and shipped during late 1941 for operation in the Middle East.

The O4 class were used to haul heavy freight trains throughout the LNER system. 329 engines remained in operation at 1 January 1948.

== Sub-classes ==
The LNER rebuilt many, allotting them into eight subclasses. Sub-class details:

- O4/1, Introduced 1911. Robinson GCR design with small boiler, Belpaire firebox, steam and vacuum brakes and water scoop.
- O4/2, Introduced 1925. O4/3 with cabs and boiler mountings reduced.
- O4/3, Introduced 1917. ROD locos with steam brake only and no water scoop.
- O4/4, Rebuilt with O2 boiler, extended rear frames and side window cab, since rebuilt again.
- O4/5, Rebuilt with shortened O2-type boiler (Diagram 15A). Retained GCR style cab
- O4/6, Introduced 1924. Rebuilt from O5 retaining higher cab. 63914-20 with side windows. All cabs eventually reduced in height.
- O4/7, Introduced 1939. Rebuilt with shortened O2-type boiler (Diagram 15D), retaining GCR smokebox.
- O4/8, Introduced 1944. Rebuilt with B1 boiler (Diagram 100A) and B1 style side window cab.

In 1944, 58 O4s were rebuilt with 100A boiler, Walschaerts valve gear and new cylinders at Gorton Works, then classified O1.

== British Railways ==
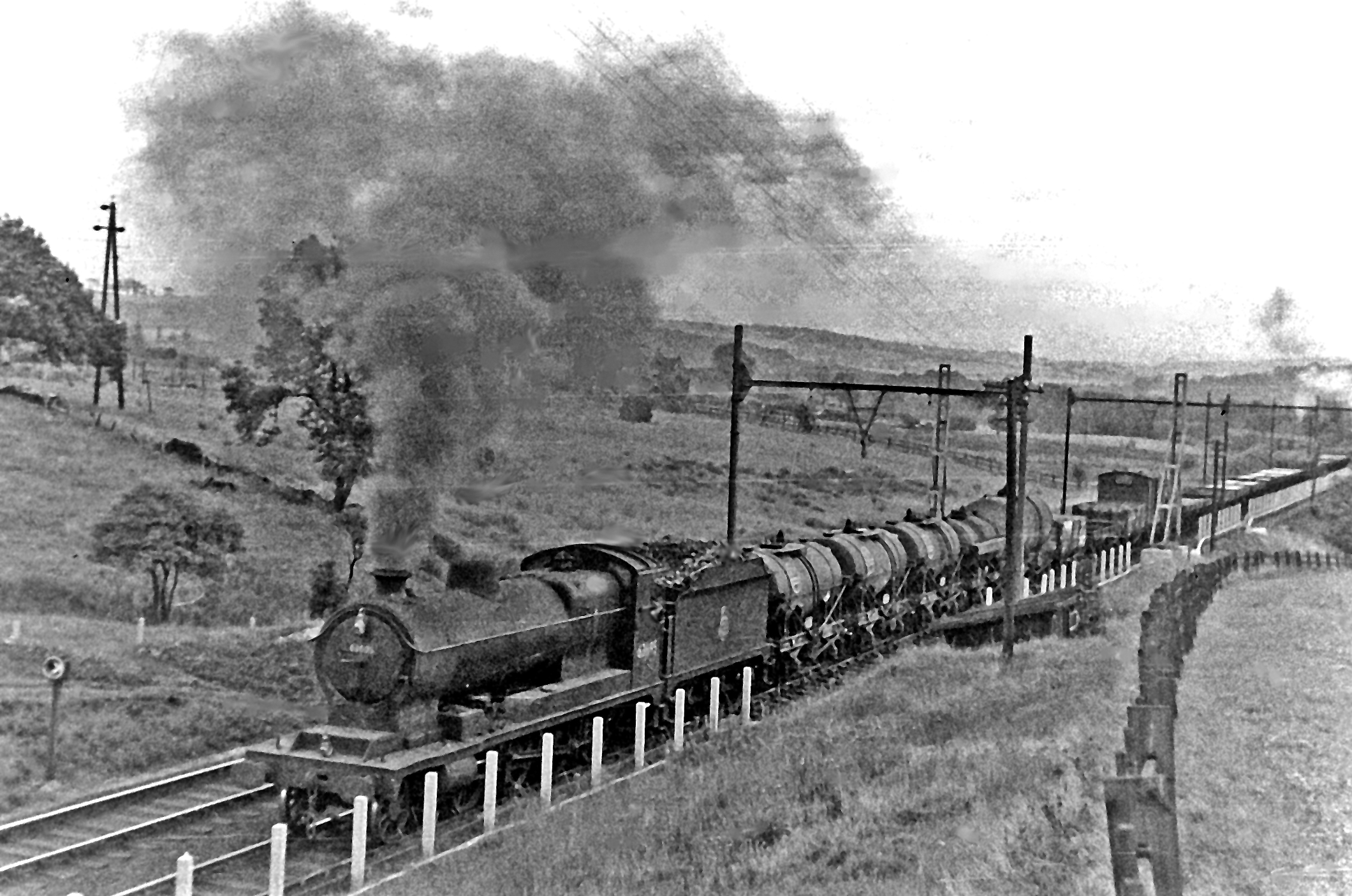
Westbound freight struggling up Worsborough Bank approaching West Silkstone Junction headed by an ex-LNER Class O4, ex-GCR Class 8K

The surviving 329 Class O4 locomotives passed to British Railways (BR) on 1 January 1948. They were then widely operated on freight trains throughout the Eastern and North Eastern regions of BR. The locomotives were given BR numbers in the range 63570-63920, but this range included 58 locomotives which had been rebuilt as Class O1. Withdrawal of O4 engines by BR commenced in 1959 and the last engine was taken out of service in the Doncaster area in April 1966.

== Preservation ==
An O4/1, GCR No. 102, BR No. 63601, is part of the extensive National Collection. Since 1996, this locomotive has been kept at the preserved Great Central Railway at Loughborough, Leicestershire. The locomotive was overhauled in the late 1990s and returned to working use in January 2000. A further three Robinson 2-8-0s were exported and survive in preservation in New South Wales, Australia.

== Gallery ==
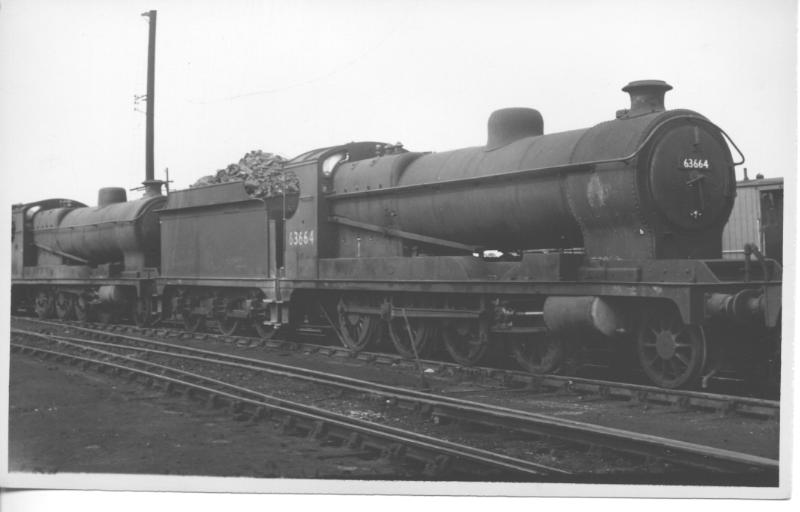
LNER Class O4/1 63664 was built by the GCR at Gorton works in 1912 as their Class 8K. Photo in service at Langwith Junction on 7 August 1960

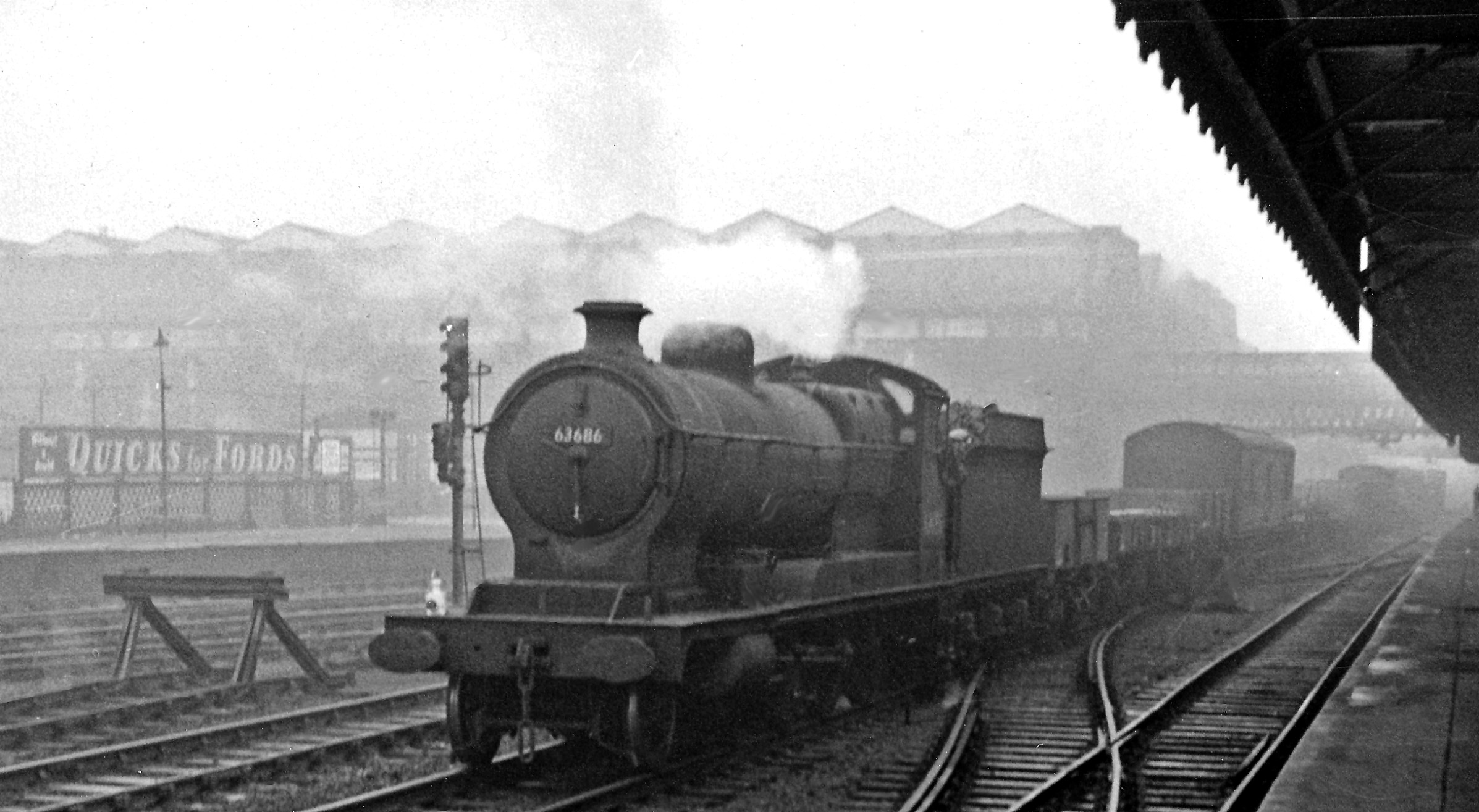
O4/3 2-8-0 No. 63686 at Manchester Victoria 1961

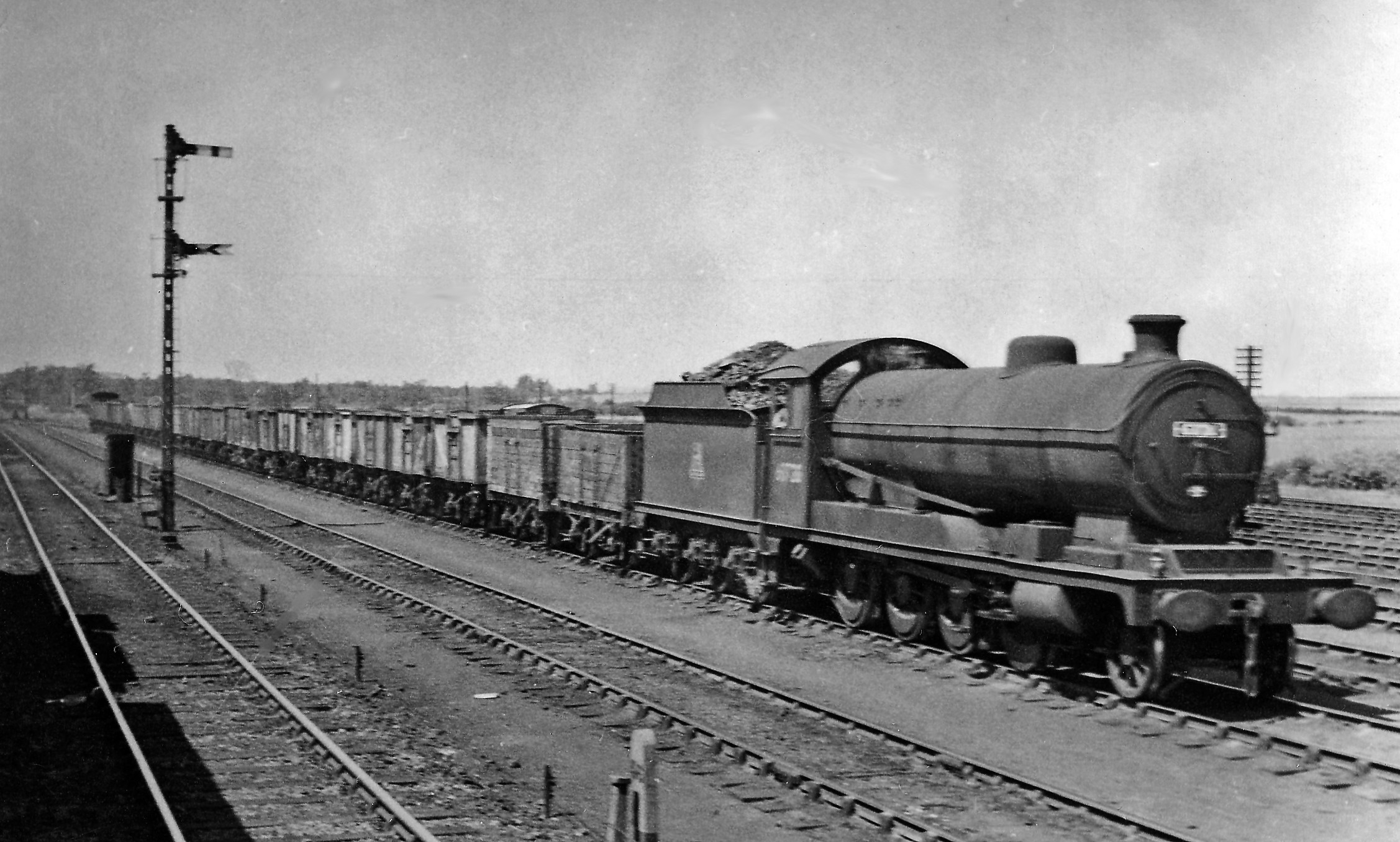
O4/8 63611 at Worksop Sidings 1957
