= List of chief mechanical engineers of the Great Western Railway =

== Great Western Railway ==
Engineer to the Great Western Railway

- Isambard Kingdom Brunel (1833-1837)

Locomotive Superintendent

- Daniel Gooch (1837–1864)
- Joseph Armstrong (1864–1877)
- William Dean (1877–1902)
- George Jackson Churchward (1902–1915)

Chief Mechanical Engineer

- George Jackson Churchward (1915–1921)
- Charles Collett (1922–1941)
- Frederick Hawksworth (1941–1947)

Northern Division Locomotive Superintendent

- Joseph Armstrong (1854–1864)
- George Armstrong (1864–1892)

== British Railways (Western Region) ==
Mechanical and Electrical Engineer

- Kenneth J Cook (1950–1951)
- Robert A Smeddle (1951–?)

== Constituent companies ==
Birkenhead Railway

- John Dixon
- T A Yarrow
- Rendell
- William Bragge
- George Douglas (1851–1860)

Bristol and Exeter Railway

- Charles Gregory (1849–1850) (Chief Engineer)
- James Pearson (1850–1875)

Cornwall Minerals Railway

- Miles Constatine

Llanelly Railway

- Joseph Hepburn
- Robert Hepburn

Llynvi and Ogmore Railway

- J Routledge

Monmouthshire Railway

- W Craig (1849–1854)
- R Laybourne (1854–1868)
- H Appleby (1868–1875)

Rhymney Railway

- Thomas Clements (1858–1862)
- Matthew Mordue (1862–1863)
- John Kendall (1863–1869)
- John Canty (1869–1884)
- Richard Jenkins (1884–1906)
- Charles T. Hurry Riches (1906-1922)

Shrewsbury and Birmingham Railway

- William Marlow (1849–1853)
- Edmund Petre
- Joseph Armstrong

Shrewsbury and Chester Railway

- A M Ross (Engineer)
- Thomas Truss (Carriage Superintendent)
- Edward Jeffreys
- Joseph Armstrong (1853–1854)

South Devon Railway;

- Frederick Gooch (1850–1864)
- Joseph Wright (1864–1876)

Taff Vale Railway

- B. S. Fisher (1869–1873)
- Tom Hurry Riches (1873-1911)
- John Cameron (1911–1922)

Vale of Neath Railway

- Joshua Williams (1851–1865) (General Manager)

West Cornwall Railway

- Skater
- H Appleby
- Joseph Wright (South Devon Railway Locomotive Superintendent)

West Midland Railway

- Edward Wilson (1860–1863)

Newport, Abergavenny and Hereford Railway

- Mark Carr (1854–1858)
- Alexander McDonnell (1858–1860)

Oxford, Worcester and Wolverhampton Railway

- David Joy (1852–1856)
- Frederic Haward (1856–1857)
- Edward Wilson (1857–1860)
