= LNER Thompson Class A2/1 =

Class of three-cylinder locomotives

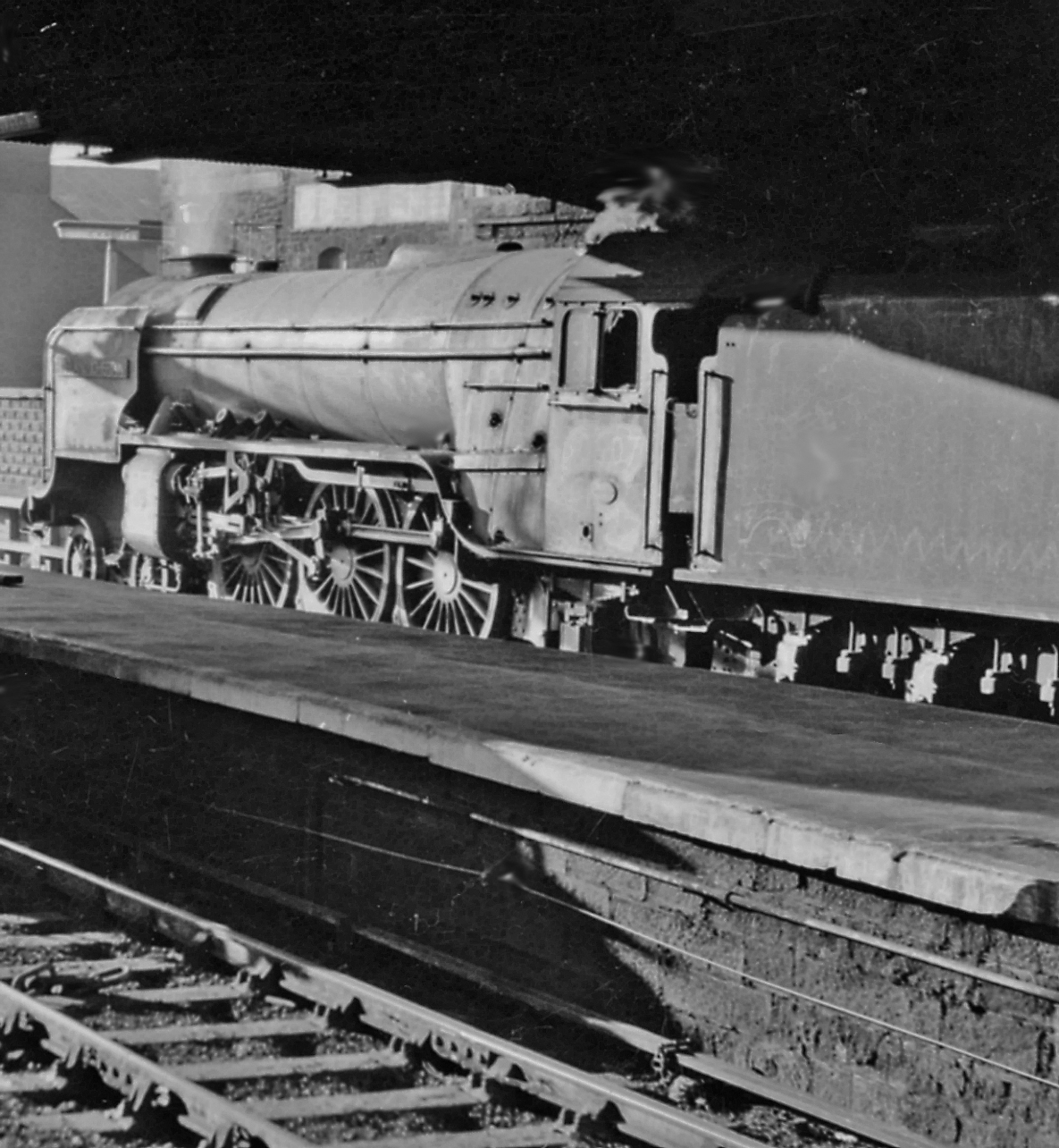
- 60507 'Highland Chieftain' waits for departure at Carlisle in August 1960.
Type and origin
- Power type: Steam
- Designer: Edward Thompson
- Builder: Darlington Works
- Build date: 1944
- Total produced: 4
Specifications
- Configuration
  - Whyte: 4-6-2
- Gauge: 4 ft 8 1/2 in (1,435 mm)
- Driver dia.: 6 ft 2 in (1.880 m)
- Loco weight: 98 long tons (100 t)
- Boiler pressure: 225 psi (1.55 MPa)
- Cylinders: Three
- Cylinder size: 19 in × 26 in (483 mm × 660 mm)
Performance figures
- Tractive effort: 36,385 lbf (161.85 kN)
Career
- Operators: London and North Eastern Railway; British Railways
- Class: A2/1
- Power class: 7P6F
- Numbers: LNER (1944): 3696-3699; LNER (from 1945): 507-510; BR: 60507-60510
- Locale: East Coast Main Line
- Withdrawn: 1960–1961
- Disposition: All scrapped

The London and North Eastern Railway (LNER) Thompson Class A2/1 was a class of 4-6-2 steam locomotives built at Darlington locomotive works during 1944. They were originally ordered as Class V2 locomotives, as designed by Sir Nigel Gresley, but were revised during construction into a 4-6-2 'Pacific' arrangement under the instruction of Edward Thompson.

== Background ==
At the time Edward Thompson succeeded Sir Nigel Gresley as Chief Mechanical Engineer of the LNER in April 1941, Darlington works was busy building Class V2 mixed traffic locomotives. Although the V2 class were competent and powerful locomotives, Thompson did not like this design as it required more servicing than his own mixed traffic B1 class 4-6-0. He also envisaged a time when the V2s would be replaced by his own design of 'Pacific' locomotives, but would not receive authority to build a new class during the war. He therefore decided to build the final four V2 already authorised as experimental 'Pacific' locomotives along similar lines to his recently rebuilt A2/2 class. The revised design was authorised in August 1943 and the new locomotives built between May 1944 and January 1945.

== Design ==
The pony truck of the V2 class was replaced by Thompson's own design of bogie and they had an extended smokebox. They retained the same boiler as the V2 class although the pressure was increased to 225 psi (1.55 MPa), giving an increased tractive effort of 36,390 lbf (161.87 kN). The firebox was also the same as the V2 although these were the first LNER locomotives to be fitted with a rocking grate and ashpan. Rather than have all three cylinders driving a single axle Thompson adopted divided drive with the middle cylinder driving the first pair of driving wheels and the outside cylinders the middle pair. Thompson also abandoned the Gresley conjugated valve gear and instead fitted independent sets of Walschaerts valve gear to each cylinder.

== Performance ==
The four locomotives of this design performed adequately but proved to be under-boilered for their size and lacked adhesion. They were less problematic than the A2/2 class, but did not distinguish themselves.

== Accidents and incidents ==
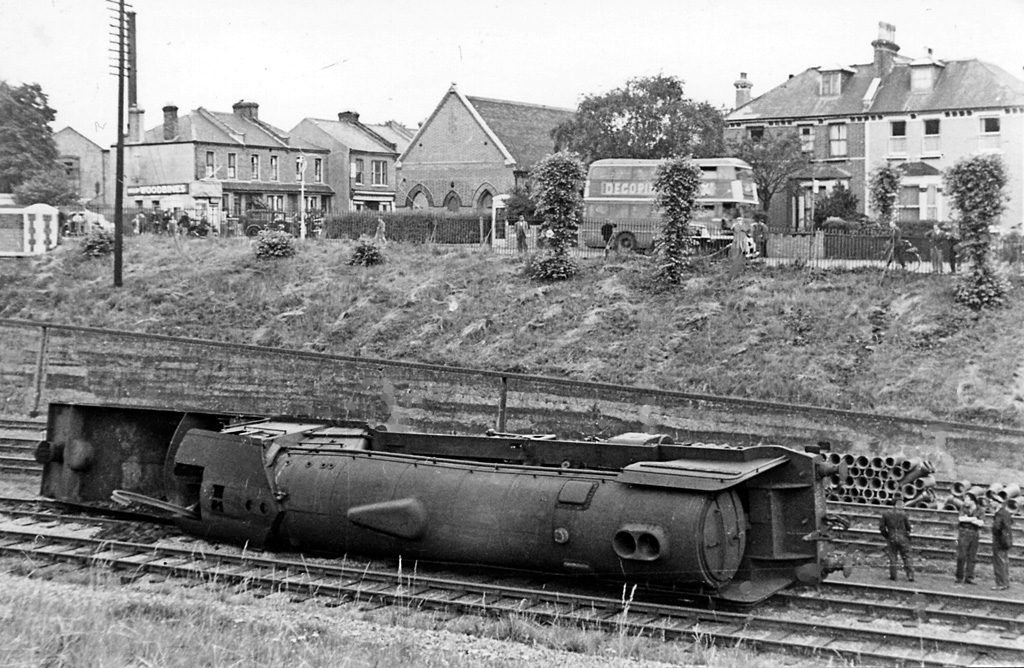
No. 60508 Duke of Rothesay lying on its side, July 1948

On 17 July 1948, locomotive No. 60508 Duke of Rothesay was hauling a passenger train when it became derailed inside Barnet Tunnel, Hertfordshire due to a combination of faulty track and excessive speed. The whole train was subsequently derailed on points at New Southgate, London. One person was killed.

== Withdrawal ==
All four locomotives were withdrawn from stock in 1960/1.

Year	Quantity in service at start of year	Quantity withdrawn	Locomotive numbers	Notes
1960	4	3	60507/09–10	
1961	1	1	60508	

== Stock list ==
Original No.	LNER No.	BR No.	Name	Entered stock	Withdrawn	Disposal Date
3696	507	60507	Highland Chieftain	13 May 1944	12 December 1960	31 December 1960
3697	508	60508	Duke of Rothesay	30 June 1944	20 February 1961	28 February 1961
3698	509	60509	Waverley	30 November 1944	15 August 1960	31 August 1960
3699	510	60510	Robert the Bruce	15 January 1945	21 November 1960	30 November 1960

== Models ==
Apple Green Engines produce a ready-to-run model of the A2/1 in 4 mm scale. PDK, Nucast, and DJH also produce 4 mm scale kits of the A2/1. Crownline have produced a 4 mm kit in the past, but this is no longer available.
