= Chief mechanical engineer =

Position in railway companies

Chief mechanical engineer and locomotive superintendent are titles applied by British, Australian, and New Zealand railway companies to the person ultimately responsible to the board of the company for the building and maintaining of the locomotives and rolling stock. In Britain, the post of locomotive superintendent was introduced in the late 1830s, and chief mechanical engineer in 1886.

== Emerging professional roles ==
In the early Victorian era, projected canal or railway schemes were prepared by groups of promoters who hired specialists such as civil engineers, surveyors, architects or contractors to survey a route; and this resulted in the issue of a prospectus setting out their proposals. Provided that adequate capital could be raised from potential investors, agreements obtained from the landowners along the proposed route and, in Britain, an Act of Parliament obtained (different terminology is used in other countries), then construction might begin either by a new company specially formed to build and run it or by an existing company.

Design, construction and day-to-day operation of the canal or railway was managed by men who might otherwise work for the promoters. Some of the pioneer railway builders were self-taught, but others had gained their engineering experience constructing canals, or in military service. In Britain, the Institution of Civil Engineers had been founded in London in 1818, with Thomas Telford as its first president and its formation pre-dated many of the railway schemes. It obtained a Royal Charter in 1828. Later, the Institution of Mechanical Engineers was formed in 1847, with George Stephenson as its first president. The Corps of Royal Engineers, a British military organisation, was older than both of these civilian engineering institutions and it had extensive experience of (military) railway operations. For this reason, for almost 150 years from its foundation by the Board of Trade in 1840, Her Majesty's Railway Inspectorate recruited suitably qualified retired officers from the Corps into its "senior" arm, as railway inspecting officers. These officers retained their former military rank within the Inspectorate. It was to be 1985 before a railway inspecting officer without a previous military career was appointed: the officer transferred across from the "junior" arm: as a former railway employment inspector. Over the same period, of almost a century and a half, the Inspectorate was headed by a retired officer of the Corps of Royal Engineers as its chief inspecting officer. Other, former army officers, such as Charles Blacker Vignoles, were to gain new careers on the railways when they became under-employed after the Napoleonic War.

In Britain, the various railway companies appointed and employed an engineer or chief engineer, who was usually a civil engineer by profession. This was a permanent management role in the company in contrast to that of contractors, for instance, who were only hired to perform specific tasks such as construction of the line. The chief engineer had his own department (and budget) and was an important company official. The chief engineer was responsible for all engineering functions: civil, which included bridges, viaducts, tunnels and track; and, later, mechanical, which included rolling stock. In some early railways, such as the Liverpool and Manchester Railway (L&MR), which opened in 1830, there was indecision on whether to use fixed engines and ropes or moving locomotives. Cases had arisen of locomotives being too heavy and breaking the cast iron rails that they had to run on; and locomotive wheels breaking and/or falling off. Finally, the L&MR's board agreed the use of moving locomotives; and the rolling stock was selected from various specialist builders by competition, at the Rainhill Trials. Soon afterwards, many railway companies were to set up their own railway workshops, although railway companies continued to buy-in locomotives from specialist manufacturers, such as Robert Stephenson and Company which was founded by George and Robert Stephenson in 1828. Some railway companies operated their own ferries, boats, and ships and these would also be the responsibility of their Chief Engineer, but they would have been ordered from shipyards. Isambard Kingdom Brunel set an example, designing three great steamships: the SS Great Western, the SS Great Britain and the SS Great Eastern – the first two being built at Bristol shipyards and the third at Millwall, London. The Institute of Engineers and Shipbuilders in Scotland was formed in 1857 as a professional body for these trades in Scotland.

The specialism of mechanical engineering became established on the railways, with an emphasis on moving parts; and, in terms of importance, this was concerned with designing and building of reliable locomotives, carriages and waggons. Private companies designed and built these items to order and could offer standard designs to railway companies as well as "specials" to meet specific customer's requirements; otherwise railway companies could and did establish workshops to build their own locomotives and carriages. In August 1837, for example, Isambard Kingdom Brunel, the Engineer responsible for the Great Western Railway, appointed Daniel Gooch locomotive superintendent to the company; and it was his responsibility to provide the locomotives, the accommodation for them and the running and the repair shops. Gooch suggested a green field site, New Swindon, and this was to lead to the building of a railway works, a railway village and eventually the town of Swindon. Swindon was not the only example of railway town or community that was created in England: Crewe being another.

== Locomotive superintendent ==
Initially, when a railway company chose to build its own rolling stock in house, the mechanical engineering aspect was regarded as a subsidiary function to that of the chief engineer and this was reflected in various job titles, such as chief of locomotive department, locomotive foreman and locomotive superintendent.

Later, there was a desire to improve the prestige, and salary, of the locomotive superintendent and a means of achieving those aims was to seek to regrade the post as chief mechanical engineer (CME). John Aspinall of the Lancashire and Yorkshire Railway was the first CME to be appointed to that post in 1886. A further six British railway companies created the post of CME between 1902 and 1914.

== Functions ==
The chief mechanical engineer was responsible for all aspects of locomotives and that included their design, testing and modification of existing designs.

The early mechanical engineer was concerned with mechanical moving parts and for many years this responsibility also included railway signalling, particularly points and semaphore signals, as these were entirely mechanically operated. With the introduction of low-power electricity to the railways, various new systems such as telegraphs, telephones and electrical signalling systems were introduced; and responsibilities of these systems were transferred to the signal and telegraph (S&T) department.

== Prominent examples ==
- R. J. Billinton
  - London, Brighton and South Coast Railway 1890–1904
- L. B. Billinton
  - London, Brighton and South Coast Railway 1912–1922
- Oliver Bulleid
  - Southern Railway, 1937–1948
  - Córas Iompair Éireann (CIÉ) (Ireland), 1950–1958
- George Jackson Churchward
  - Great Western Railway, 1902–1921
- Charles Collett
  - Great Western Railway 1921–1941
- Dugald Drummond
  - North British Railway 1875–1882
  - Caledonian Railway 1882–1890
  - London and South Western Railway 1895–1912
- Peter Drummond
  - Highland Railway 1896–1911
  - Glasgow and South Western Railway 1912–1918
- Henry Fowler
  - Midland Railway, 1909–1923
  - London, Midland and Scottish Railway, 1925–1931
- Daniel Gooch
  - Great Western Railway, 1837–1864
- John Viret Gooch
  - London and South Western Railway, 1841–1850
- Nigel Gresley
  - Great Northern Railway, 1911–1922
  - London and North Eastern Railway, 1923–1941
- David Anderson Hendrie
  - Natal Government Railways ?−1909
  - South African Railways and Harbours 1910–1922
- Matthew Holmes
  - North British Railway 1882–1903
- George Ivatt
  - London, Midland and Scottish Railway, 1945–1947
- John F. McIntosh
  - Caledonian Railway 1895–1914
- Frederick Mills
  - Western Australian Government Railways 1940–1949
- Arthur H. Peppercorn
  - London and North Eastern Railway, 1946–1947
- William Pickersgill
  - Great North of Scotland Railway 1894–1914
  - Caledonian Railway 1914–1923
- Vincent Raven
  - North Eastern Railway, 1910–1922
- William P. Reid
  - North British Railway, 1903–1919
- Robert Riddles
  - British Railways, 1948–1953
- John G. Robinson
  - Great Central Railway, 1900–1922
- Mervyn F. Ryan
  - Central Argentine Railway, 1918–1925
- William Stanier
  - London, Midland and Scottish Railway, 1932–1944
- Matthew Stirling
  - Hull and Barnsley Railway, ?-1922
- Patrick Stirling
  - Great Northern Railway, 1866–?
- Robert Absalom Thom
  - Lancashire, Derbyshire and East Coast Railway, 1902–1907
- Edward Thompson
  - London and North Eastern Railway, 1941–1946
- Francis Webb
  - London and North Western Railway 1870–1906
- B. D. Rampala
  - Sri Lanka Railways 1910–1994

== See also ==
- List of Chief Mechanical Engineers of the Great Western Railway
- List of Chief Mechanical Engineers of the London and North Eastern Railway
- List of Chief Mechanical Engineers of the London, Midland and Scottish Railway
- List of Chief Mechanical Engineers of the Southern Railway
- List of Chief Mechanical Engineers of the Western Australian Government Railways
