= Steam locomotives of the 21st century =

Steam power on modern railways

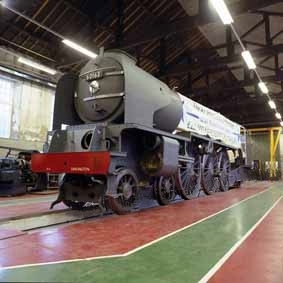
LNER Peppercorn Class A1 60163 Tornado under construction in 2002

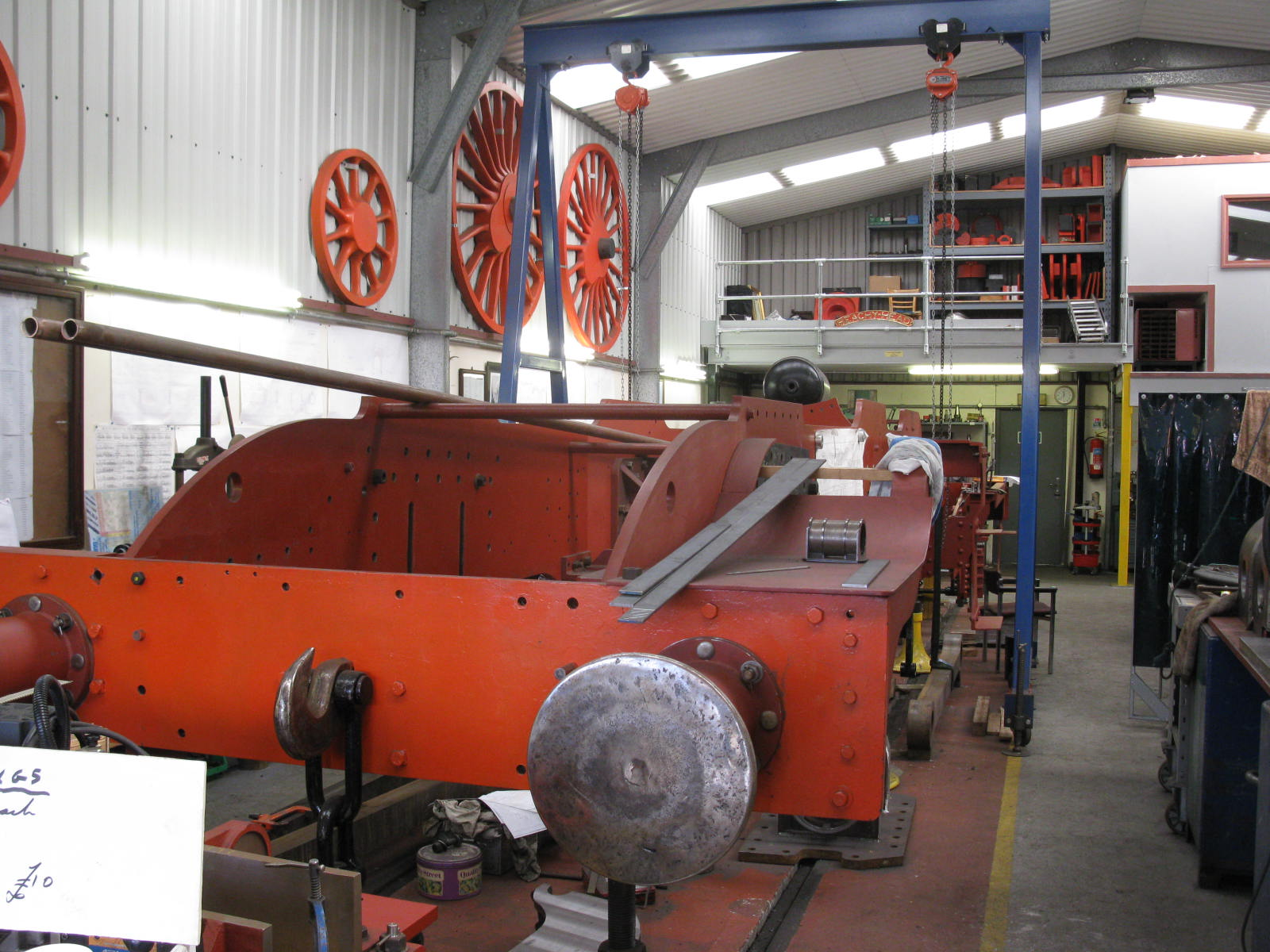
The frames of LBSC H2 Atlantic 32424 Beachy Head under construction at Sheffield Park, Bluebell Railway in 2009

Despite the advent of electric and diesel locomotives in the mid-20th century, steam locomotives continue to be used and constructed into the 21st century.

Steam locomotives constructed in the 21st century fall into two broad categories: those that use advanced steam technology to be commercially competitive with diesels; and those built to more traditional designs for hauling tourist trains. Even locomotives in the second case likely use some modern methods and materials. These include welded boilers, to simplify construction, and roller bearings to improve reliability. For health and safety reasons and laws, asbestos is not used for boiler lagging and is replaced by other materials, such as glass fibre. If the locomotive runs on main lines, safety systems such as the Train Protection & Warning System (TPWS) and an On-Train Monitoring Recorder (OTMR) must be fitted.

== Late 20th Century & Early 21st Century ==
Steam locomotives were still produced up until 1999 in mainland China with the last locomotive built being SY-1772. Several members of the class were also built for heritage railways in the USA. Other locomotive classes that were still being built in China during the 1980s and 1990s include the QJ class, C2 class and JS class. In East Germany steam trains saw use up into the 1990s on narrow gauge networks with some still being steam hauled today. In 1985 a replica of the Iron Duke class locomotive was built by the Didcot Railway Centre; this was later followed by the construction of a replica at the Coalbrookdale Museum in 1990 of the Coalbrookdale Locomotive, later in 1991. No.7 of the Talyllyn Railway was constructed while a replica of Planet was constructed at the Manchester Museum of Science & Industry, several locomotives based on the design of BRB H 2/3 No. 6 and 7 were built in Austria and Switzerland for the Schafberg Railway, Chemin de fer Montreux–Territet–lion–Rochers-de-Naye and Brienz-Rothorn Railway between 1992 and 1996. Locomotives of the class CFR/CFF 764-4 were constructed between 1982 and 1987 in Romania for forestry railways. In the United States the Northwestern Steel and Wire mill in Sterling, Illinois operated steam train until 1980 while one railway, Crab Orchard and Egyptian Railway used steam locomotives until 1986. In Australia two railways in New South Wales still operated steam locomotives with South Maitland ending steam operations in 1983 while the Richmond Vale Railway ended their steam operations in 1987.

== Revenue operations ==
JS-class steam locomotives were used in active service at a rural coal mine in western China until January 2024. They hauled coal trains until 2022, after which a few remained as switchers. In Eritrea, steam locomotives are still used in irregular revenue and commercial service. Due to oil shortages in North Korea, steam engines have started to be brought back into service. In the Tuzla region of Bosnia and Herzegovina, the coal mines still use World War II-era German-built steam locomotives. On the island of Java in Indonesia, several sugarcane tramways still use steam locomotives. Several railways in Cuba continue to use steam trains with these being used for sugar cane plantation farms or tourism.

Railfan & Railroad stated in 2022 that "the only places on earth to see steam locomotives in revenue freight service are small switching operations in China, North Korea and Bosnia", but that these were "sporadic at best".

== Advanced steam construction ==
On 25 August 2009 Inspiration, developed by the British Steam Car Challenge team, broke the record for a steam vehicle set by a Stanley Steamer in 1906, setting a new speed record of 139.843 mph (225.055 km/h) over a measured mile at Edwards Air Force Base in the Mojave Desert of California. Both the old and new records are only slightly faster than the record for the fastest ever steam locomotive record. The next day Team Inspiration broke a second record by setting a new speed record of 148.308 mph (238.679 km/h) over a measured kilometer. The team behind Inspiration have since set up a company, Steamology, to develop small modular steam generators burning hydrogen and oxygen to make high-pressure steam. These units can be drop-in replacements for the power trains of diesel-electric locomotives and other heavy transport. In June 2024 Steamology signed a contract with Arup and Eversholt Rail in collaboration with Freightliner under the H2Steam banner, to refit a Class 60 locomotive with a Steamology hydrogen unit in 2025. The conversion will replace the diesel engine with 20 steam generators, four steam turbines and 140 kg of gas storage, creating a 2MW zero emission locomotive.

DLM AG, formerly part of the Swiss Locomotive and Machine Works (SLM) that built most of the world's mountain railways, has worked on advanced steam since its buyout from SLM in 2000. They rebuilt 52 8055 with oil-fired advanced steam technologies and now offer trips with it including cab rides. They claim that modern steam locomotives on mountain railways have similar running costs to diesel engines.

The 5AT Advanced Technology Steam Locomotive hoped to create a modern steam locomotive based on the well-documented BR Standard Class 5, incorporating the experience of British engineer David Wardale in modernising the South African Class 26 4-8-4 Red Devil. This project was officially cancelled in March 2012 due to lack of support, but the 5AT Group reformed as the non-profit Advanced Steam Traction Trust. The ASTT studies different options for modern steam and is building a one-fifth scale, 10¼” gauge prototype called Revolution as a low-cost way to demonstrate some of their ideas. In August 2025 they showed the part-built Revolution at an event for the Railway 200 celebrations at Alstom's works in Derby.

== Traditional steam construction ==
=== Built ===
==== Denmark ====
- SJS Odin Class 2-2-2 "Odin" replica, built between 2004 and 2018.

==== Germany ====
- 99. 2324–4, a replica of the DRG Class 99.32 built in 2008/09, in scheduled passenger service on the Molli railway.
- Saxon I K Nr. 54, built 2006/09.

==== India ====
- Nilgiri Mountain Railway X class 4 built between 2011 and 2014, 2 built in 2021. 5 were oil fired, one loco 37400 was designed to be coal fired.
- Darjeeling Himalayan Railway B Class 2 built in 2004.

==== Switzerland ====
- BRB H2/3 Class 6 built between 1992 and 1995, 1x for the BRB as H2/3, 1x for MTGN and 4x for the Austrian State Railways (ÖBB).

==== United Kingdom ====
Standard gauge

- LNER Peppercorn Class A1 4-6-2 60163 Tornado, built from 1994 to 2008. Completed 1 August 2008.
- GWR 2900 Saint 4-6-0 2999 Lady of Legend, built from 2009 to 2019. Completed 5 April 2019. The locomotive is a conversion from GWR 4900 4-6-0 4942 Maindy Hall.
- LB&SCR H2 class 4-4-2 No. 32424 Beachy Head. This project however is a replica of the fourth Atlantic 32424 Beachy Head and has incorporated some parts from the original locomotive. Being commissioned into service. Completed on March 5, 2024.
- GWR 6800 Class 6880 Betton Grange, a 4-6-0 completed on 11 April 2024 by the 6880 Society and operated at Tyseley Locomotive Works.
- GWR steam railmotor No. 93. Restored from 1998 to 2012. It ran with Auto Trailer No. 92 for the first time in 2013.

Broad gauge

- GWR Firefly Class 2-2-2 replica, built 2005. Currently on static display.

Narrow gauge

- Lyd. A 2-6-2T, built from 1999 to 2010 by the Ffestiniog Railway. First steamed on 2 May 2010, it ran its first passenger train on 11 September the same year. Despite being somewhat of a replica of Lew (and based on the design of the latter), it was named Lyd.
- Lyn. A 2-4-2T, built from 2009 to 2017 by the 762 Club. First steamed on 8 July 2017.
- Corris Railway No. 7 0-4-2ST, completed in 2005 for the revived Corris Railway by Winson Engineering and Drayton Designs, based on the original No. 4, a Kerr Stuart "Tattoo."
- Corris Railway Hughes Falcon Works 0-4-2ST, No. 10, by Alan Keef Ltd. based on the original Nos. 1, 2, and 3. Passed its steam test on September 21, 2022, and debuted operation at the start of the 2023 passenger season.
- Ffestiniog Railway Double Fairlie 0-4-4-0T No. 8 James Spooner. A new locomotive built to replace Earl of Merioneth reusing the name of a double Fairlie withdrawn in 1928. Completed on October 6, 2023.
- Southwold Railway 2-4-0T, No. 3 Blyth, replica of original locomotive with same name and number.

==== United States ====
- Steam into History 4-4-0 No. 17 "York". Completed in 2013 by the Kloke Locomotive Works. Although not based on a specific locomotive aside from the looks of American steam locomotives in the 19th century, it is still considered a newbuilt. It runs on oil instead of wood.
- Central Pacific Leviathan, a 4-4-0. Completed in 2009 by the Kloke Locomotive Works. Now runs as Pennsylvania Railroad 331.
- Wales West Light Railway 0-4-2ST "Dame Ann". Built at the Exmoor Steam Railway in England and delivered to the railroad in 2004. Based on the Penrhyn Port Class locomotives built by the Hunslet Engine Company in the 19th century, it was the first engine of its kind built in over 83 years.

=== Under construction ===
==== Australia ====
- South Australian Railways Z class 4-4-0 Z199

==== Ireland ====
- NCC Class W 2-6-0 no 105.

==== United Kingdom ====
- BR Standard Class 2 2-6-2T 84030 project – tank conversion of 2-6-0 2MT No. 78059.
- BR Standard Class 3 2-6-2T 82045 project.
- BR Standard Class 6 4-6-2 72010 Hengist project. Newbuild member of class of the original unbuilt class-members of the second batch for the Southern region.
- GCR Class 2 (LNER Class D7) 4-4-0 567 project.
- GER Class M15 (LNER Class F5) 2-4-2T 67218 project.
- GWR 1000 County 4-6-0 1014 County of Glamorgan. Replica of an original engine that was scrapped in 1964.
- GWR 3800 County 4-4-0 3840 County of Montgomery.
- GWR 4700 Class 2-8-0 4709 project.
- LMS Patriot Class 4-6-0 5551 The Unknown Warrior. Replica of the original engine (which was never given a name throughout its working career) which was scrapped in 1962.
- LNER Class B17 4-6-0 61673 Spirit of Sandringham project.
- LNER Class P2 2-8-2 2001 Cock O' the North project. Replica of original engine in streamlined condition.
- LNER Class P2 2-8-2 2007 Prince of Wales project. New build member of class in original unstreamlined condition.
- LNER Class V4 2-6-2 3403 Highlander. Construction of the locomotive will begin after 2007 Prince of Wales is complete. Drawings for the engine have been acquired along with tyres for the engines pony truck, cartazzi and 5 ft 8in driving wheels. A chimney has also been acquired alongside two speedometer drive generators.
- LNWR Bloomer Class 2-2-2 670 replica. Construction began in 1986; it was 90% complete by 1990 but has never been finished. Work recommenced in 2017, but another project to finish the locomotive was launched on June 24, 2019.
- LNWR George the Fifth Class 4-4-0 2013 Prince George project.
- NER Class K 0-4-0T replica of original class member No.559.
- NER Class O (LNER Class G5) 0-4-4T replica of original class member No. 1759 project.
- Ffestiniog Railway George England 0-4-0T+T No. 3 Mountaineer. A replica of the original locomotive built in 1863 and scrapped in 1879(?). It will be named Mountaineer III, since another side tank locomotive (built for the WD in 1916) re-used the name.
- North Wales Narrow Gauge Railways Single Fairlie 0-6-4T Gowrie.
- Catch Me Who Can 2-2-0 replica of Richard Trevithick locomotive of 1808. (Able to turn wheels under steam when set on blocks, but not yet ready to run on rails since braking system not fitted, yet)

==== United States ====
- PRR T1 4-4-4-4 duplex No. 5550: The Pennsylvania Railroad built 52 4-4-4-4 duplex locomotives for passenger service, and the last one was scrapped in 1956. The Pennsylvania Railroad T1 Steam Locomotive Trust was created to construct a fully functional 53rd member of the T1 class. The new T1, to be numbered 5550, is expected to be completed by the year 2030. As of May 2026, the project is 65.4% complete.
- WW&F No. 11: The Wiscasset, Waterville, and Farmington Railway Museum is constructing No. 11, which is meant to be a replica of the original WW&F's No. 7. No. 7 was a Baldwin 28-ton 2-4-4T Forney locomotive (Baldwin classification 10-16 1/4 C-5a) which was scrapped in 1937 along with the rest of the railroad, being badly damaged in the 1931 Wiscasset roundhouse fire. The new locomotive is being constructed traditional techniques and tools, such as a riveted boiler. The project has been underway since 2007. Completed components include the bell and builder's plate, as well as wheel center castings, drive pins, wheelshets and frame. No scheduled completion date is set.
- V&T Lyon, 2-6-0, replica of original engine. The replica was delivered to the Nevada State Railroad Museum in Carson City in 2020 but was not yet operational.

=== Proposed ===
==== United Kingdom ====
- LNER Class K3 2-6-0. Planned to be built after the V3 & V4 are completed.
- LNER Class V3 2-6-2T. Planned to be built following completion of the V4.

==== New Zealand ====
- NZR H class As part of phase 3 of the restoration of the Rimutaka Incline, the Rimutaka Incline Railway Heritage Trust is planning to build 2 replicas of the H class (Which were the main motive power on the incline).

=== Cancelled ===
==== Australia ====
- Victorian Railways V class 499. The project was canceled in 2022 for unknown reasons and the parts were later distributed.

==== United Kingdom ====
- GER Class H88 (LNER Class D16/2) 4-4-0 8783 Phoenix project; cancelled in 2024 due to lack of funding and usable internal motion drawings.
- GNR Class J23 (LNER Class J50) 0-6-0T 8905 project. This project was cancelled in February 2019 due to "circumstances beyond control". All the funds raised were donated to the LNER Class P2 2-8-2 2007 Prince of Wales project.
- GWR 2221 County Class 4-4-2T.
- Highland Railway Ben Class 4-4-0 no 54398 Ben Alder. Replica of original engine that was hoped to be preserved.
- LMS Fowler 2-6-4T no 42424.
- LNER Class B17 4-6-0 61662 Manchester United project (replica of original engine) – parts sent on to Spirit of Sandringham project.
- SECR E Class 4-4-0 no 516.

==== Ireland ====
- NCC Class WT No. 58 Project. The RPSI had considered the possibility of building a new member of the class however this was dropped and is instead replaced by a project to build a new NCC Class W tender locomotive instead.
