= LNER Class V4 3403 Highlander =

Planned British steam locomotive

LNER 3403 Highlander
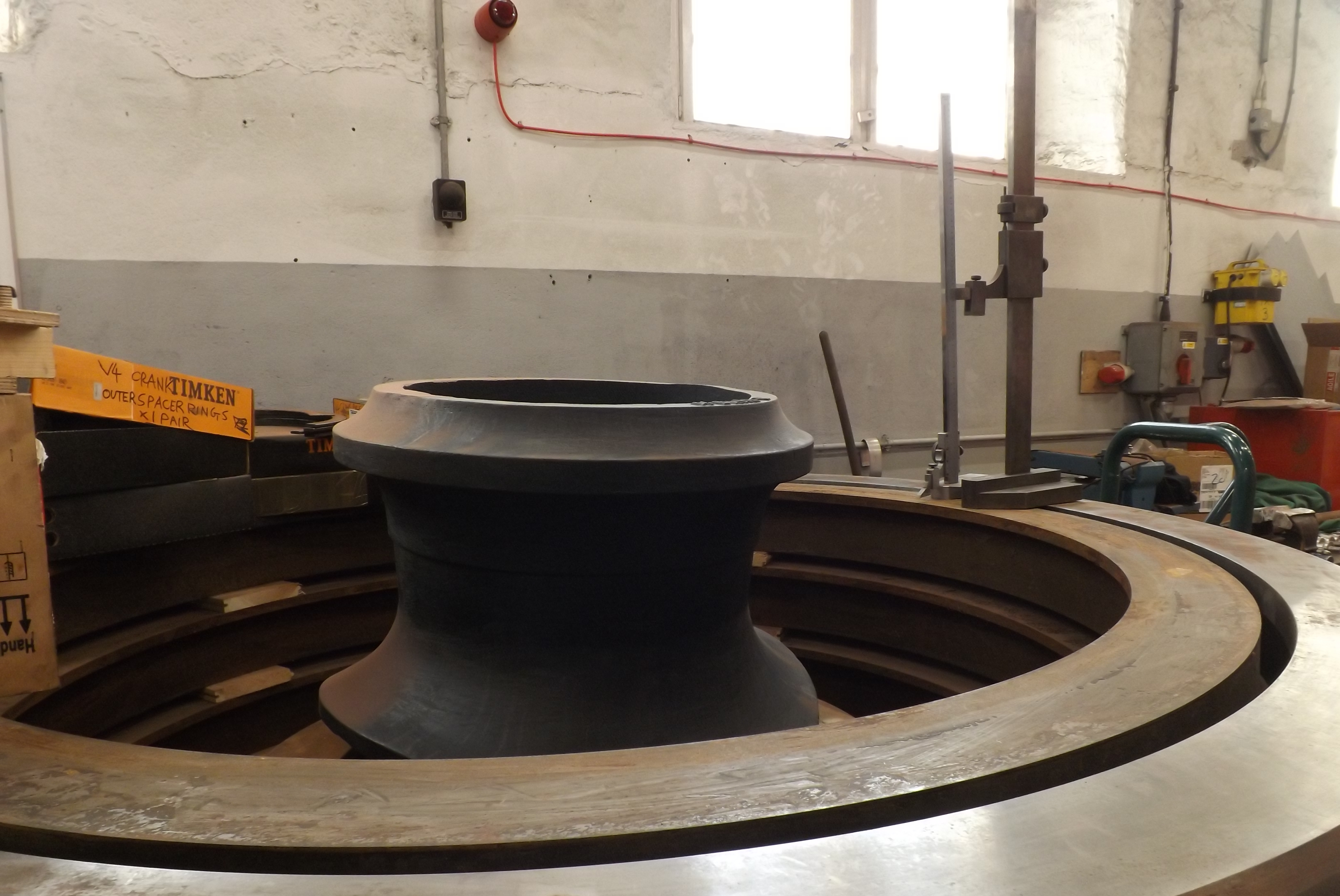
- Highlander's chimney and a completed set of tyres
Type and origin
- Power type: Steam
- Designer: Sir Nigel Gresley (original designer)
- Builder: A1 Steam Locomotive Trust
Specifications
- Configuration
  - Whyte: 2-6-2
  - UIC: 1′C1′ h3
- Leading dia.: 3 ft 2 in (0.97 m)
- Driver dia.: 5 ft 8 in (1.73 m)
- Trailing dia.: 3 ft 2 in (0.97 m)
- Wheelbase: 29 ft 4 in (8.94 m) engine 13 ft 0 in (3.96 m) tender 50 ft 2 1/4 in (15.297 m) total
- Axle load: 17 long tons (17 t)
- Loco weight: 70.4 long tons (71.5 t)
- Tender weight: 42.75 long tons (43.44 t)
- Total weight: 113.15 long tons (114.97 t)
- Firebox
  - Grate area: 28.5 sq ft (2.65 m^{2})
- Boiler: 5 ft 4 in (1.63 m) diameter
- Boiler pressure: 250 psi (1.7 MPa)
- Heating surface
  - Firebox: 151.6 sq ft (14.08 m^{2})
  - Tubes: 884.3 sq ft (82.15 m^{2})
  - Flues: 408.2 sq ft (37.92 m^{2})
  - Total surface: 1,799.9 sq ft (167.22 m^{2})
- Superheater
  - Heating area: 355.8 sq ft (33.05 m^{2})
- Cylinders: 3
- Cylinder size: 15 in × 26 in (380 mm × 660 mm)
- Valve gear: Outside: Walschaerts; Inside: Gresley conjugated
Performance figures
- Tractive effort: 27,420 lbf (122.0 kN)
Career
- Numbers: 3403
- Disposition: Construction planned

LNER Class V4 3403 Highlander is a planned 2-6-2 "Prairie" steam locomotive. It is intended as a third member of the class and will be built to the original designs by Nigel Gresley, the former Chief Mechanical Engineer for the London and North Eastern Railway (LNER).

The original V4s were built in 1941 at the Doncaster Works, becoming the final locomotives designed by Gresley prior to his death. Both locomotives initially underwent trials on the eastern region, before their move to Scotland, where they spent most of their time pulling passenger trains around Edinburgh, before running the same services on the line between Glasgow and Fort William. After their transfer to the Eastfield depot in 1949, they operated goods, and occasional passenger trains to Edinburgh, Perth, and Kinross. The pair were allocated to Aberdeen in 1954, where they operated until their withdrawal and scrapping in 1957.

At the A1 Steam Locomotive Trust's Silver Jubilee Convention, the group announced that after the completion of P2 Class 2007 Prince of Wales, they would begin construction on a new V4 which will be number 3403. On the 6 September 2018, the A1 Trust officially announced that it had started the pre-launch stage for project, with a projected cost of £3 million, and an estimated starting date of 2021. It is estimated to take around 5 years. In October of 2022, the A1 Steam Locomotive Trust announced that 3403 will be named Highlander.
