= GWR 6800 Class 6880 Betton Grange =

New-build British 4-6-0 locomotive

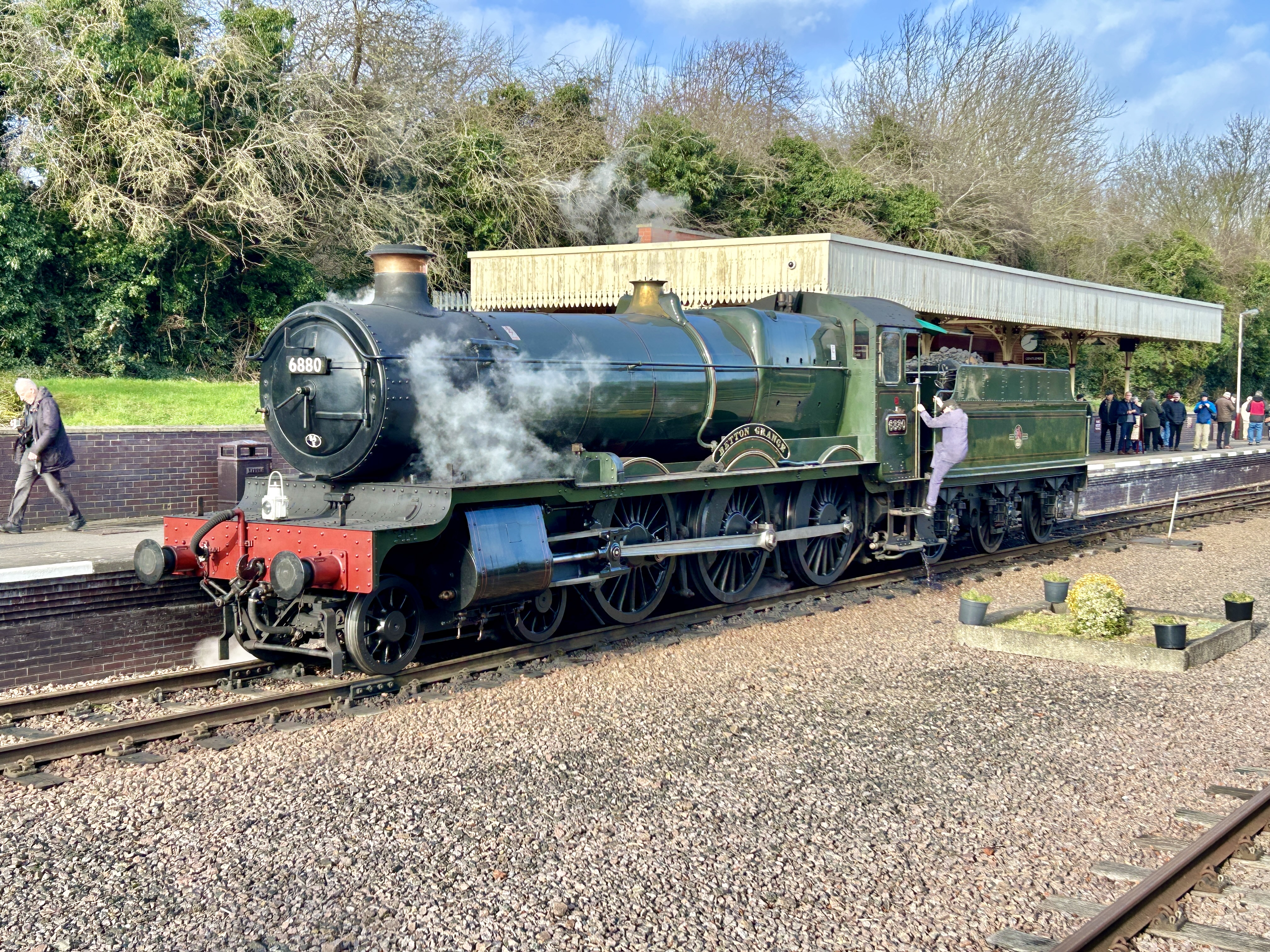
- Betton Grange in January 2025.
Type and origin
- Power type: Steam
- Designer: C.B. Collett (original designer)
- Builder: 6800 Society
- Build date: 1998–2024
Specifications
- Configuration
  - Whyte: 4-6-0
  - UIC: 2'C h
- Gauge: 4 ft 8 1/2 in (1,435 mm)
- Leading dia.: 3 ft 0 in (0.914 m)
- Driver dia.: 5 ft 8 in (1.727 m)
- Minimum curve: 8 chains (530 ft; 160 m) normal, 7 chains (460 ft; 140 m) slow
- Length: 63 ft 0 1/4 in (19.21 m)
- Width: 8 ft 11 1/4 in (2.72 m)
- Height: 13 ft 0 in (3.96 m)
- Axle load: 18 long tons 8 cwt (41,200 lb or 18.7 t)
- Adhesive weight: 55 long tons 2 cwt (123,400 lb or 56 t)
- Loco weight: 74 long tons 0 cwt (165,800 lb or 75.2 t) full
- Tender weight: 40 long tons 0 cwt (89,600 lb or 40.6 t) full
- Fuel type: Coal
- Fuel capacity: 7 long tons 0 cwt (15,700 lb or 7.1 t)
- Water cap.: 3,500 imp gal (16,000 L; 4,200 US gal)
- Firebox
  - Grate area: 27.07 sq ft (2.515 m^{2})
- Boiler pressure: 225 psi (1.55 MPa)
- Heating surface
  - Firebox: 154.78 sq ft (14.380 m^{2})
  - Tubes and flues: 1,686.60 sq ft (156.690 m^{2})
  - Total surface: 2,461.4 sq ft (228.67 m^{2})
- Superheater
  - Heating area: 4-element: 191.8 sq ft (17.82 m^{2}), 6-element: 253.38 sq ft (23.540 m^{2})
- Cylinders: Two, outside
- Cylinder size: 18.5 in × 30 in (470 mm × 762 mm)
Performance figures
- Tractive effort: 28,875 lbf (128.44 kN)
Career
- Operators
- Power class: GWR: D; BR: 5MT
- Numbers: 6880
- Official name: Betton Grange
- Axle load class: GWR: Red
- Disposition: Operational, currently based at the Gloucestershire Warwickshire Railway

GWR 6800 Class No. 6880 Betton Grange is a steam locomotive built between 1998 and 2024 as a "new-build" project, originally based on the Llangollen Railway in Denbighshire, Wales, then subsequently at Tyseley Locomotive Works. Described on the project's website as "building the 81st Grange", the project started in 1998.

The locomotive was constructed because all of the original GWR 6800 Class Grange locomotives were withdrawn for scrap by the end of 1965. The locomotive is constructed from an assemblage of original GWR and newly manufactured components.

The locomotive's completion date was plagued by a number of delays. Initially expected to be operational in 2013, the locomotive steamed for the first time in April 2024 after more than 25 years of work.

== The Grange Class ==
The Granges were effectively a smaller-wheeled version of the GWR Hall Class. The GWR also built a lighter version of the Granges, the GWR 7800 Class, known as the Manor Class, which had smaller boilers.

The 6800 Class had driving wheels of 5 feet 8 inches (1.73 m) diameter, four inches smaller than those of the Hall Class. However, as their cylinders were of the same size and the two classes shared the Swindon No. 1 boiler, the Grange had a tractive effort 1,600 lb greater than the Hall. Hence, with their power and mixed traffic characteristics, the Grange locomotives could handle most duties on the network. The British Railways power classification of the Grange Class was 5MT, its GWR power class was D, and its route availability colour code was red.

No. 6880 Betton Grange was the next Grange due to be constructed by the GWR, to be named after the manor house in the Shropshire hamlet of Betton Strange. However, the onset of Second World War stopped the construction programme.

The class was withdrawn between 1960 and 1965 as part of the British Railways modernisation plan. The last of the Grange Class, No. 6872 Crawley Grange was withdrawn and scrapped in 1965, and none were preserved.

== Project Background ==
Inspired by the success of the A1 Steam Locomotive Trust in building the LNER Peppercorn Class A1 60163 Tornado the Llangollen Railway Society explored the possibility of recreating a new build Grange from existing parts of various locomotives, utilising the "kit of standard bits" construction approach adopted by the GWR.

After the Beeching Axe, British Railways had sold many of its steam locomotives to a number of privately owned scrap yards, the most famous of which was Woodham Brothers in Barry Island, South Wales. Whilst many of the early locomotives that were recovered from Barry were complete, later examples lacked non-ferrous fittings, pipework and valve gear, and were at worst simply frames, wheels, and a rusty boiler. Purchasers faced the dilemma of restoring their locomotive using newly fabricated parts, or dismantling it and using the parts to restore other, more complete, examples.

The Grange project represents a third approach, by using parts from scrapped locomotives in a new-build project.

== GWR 6880 Betton Grange Project ==
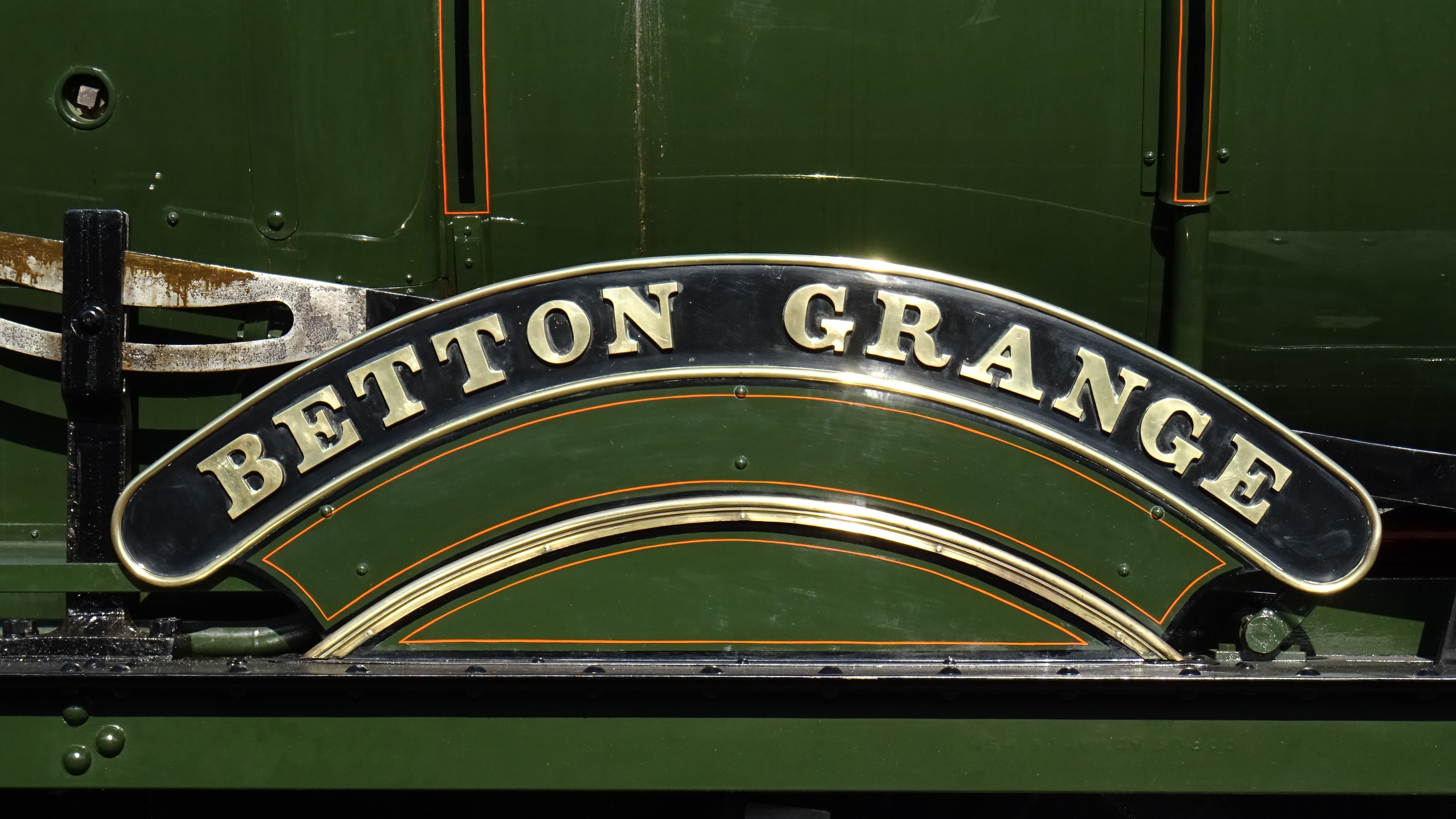
Betton Grange's nameplate.

The 6880 Society (registered charity, no: 1100537) was formed in 1998, with the sole purpose of constructing an operational Grange Class steam locomotive. As the GWR rebuild programme stopped at the end of the first batch of 80 locomotives, assigning a putative name and number to the proposed locomotive was a relatively easy procedure. From GWR records, No. 6880 Betton Grange was the next locomotive scheduled to come off the assembly line at Swindon Works, hence the projected locomotive became known as "the 81st Grange."

The core of the society was formed by the group who had recovered from Barry the GWR 5101 Class Large Prairie No. 5199 and restored it to operation at Llangollen.

Both the main frames and the cab for No. 6880 were newly fabricated, with cutting commencing in September 2004. The cab was completed in time for the Crewe Works gathering in 2005.

In 2005 the society acquired the boiler from GWR 6959 "Modified Hall" Class No. 7927 Willington Hall. The frames and wheelsets from the bogie and tender from the Hall have been retained by Didcot Railway Centre to build a GWR 1000 County Class, another class of GWR locomotive which was not preserved. The society also acquired the spare tender frame from GWR 4900 Class 4936 Kinlet Hall.

In 2010 the society bought GWR 4900 Hall Class No. 5952 Cogan Hall from the Cambrian Railways Trust. The long-term aim is to fully restore this locomotive to operational condition, but in the short term the society have borrowed its bogie and tender for the Grange project, to speed the project to a successful conclusion.

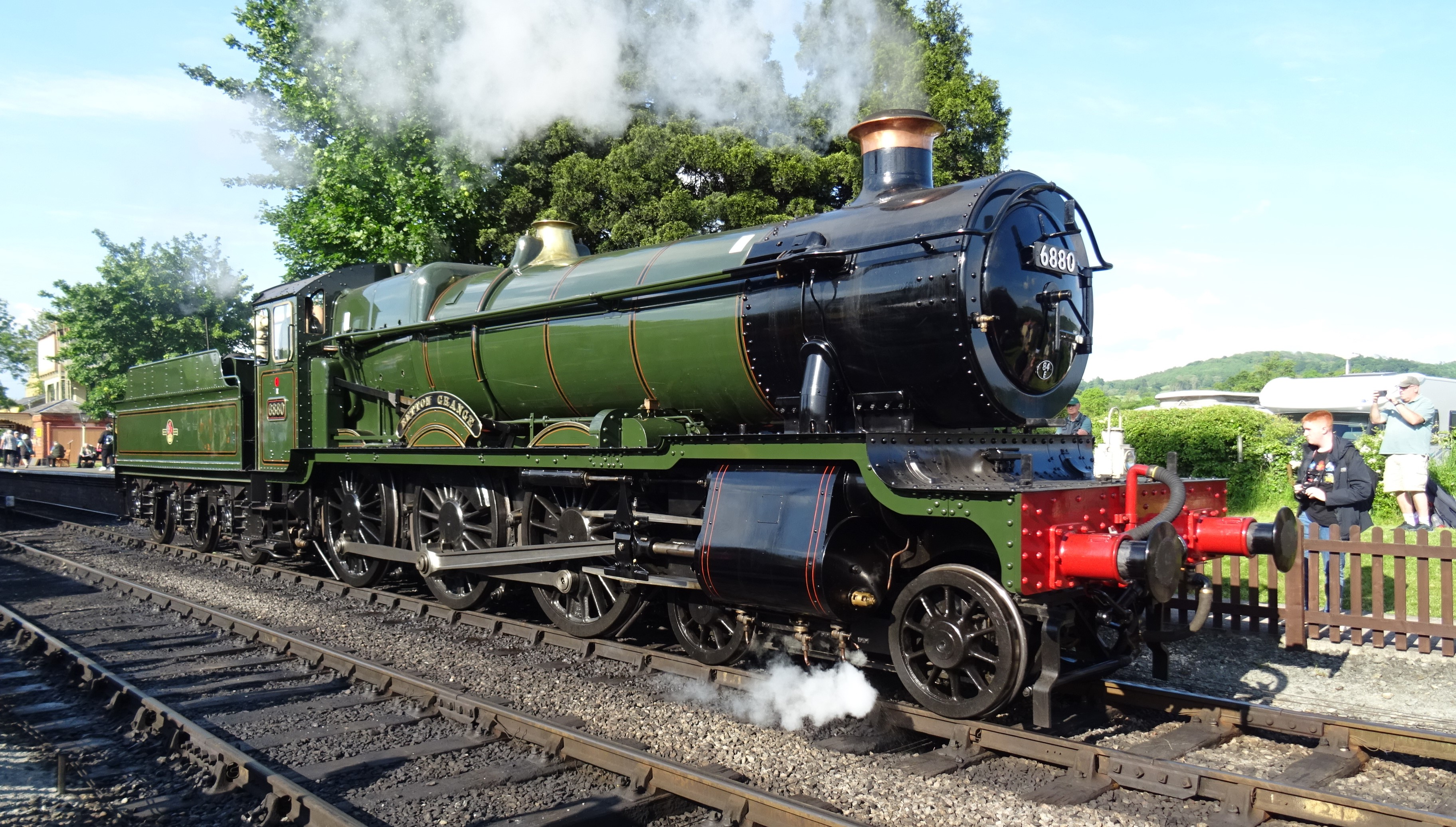
6880 at Toddington railway station in May 2024

The locomotive was expected to be operational by 2013, but subsequently by Autumn 2021, which was then pushed back to January 2024, which was delayed again to April 2024. The locomotive eventually steamed for the first time on 11 April 2024. The launch ceremony was on 27 April 2024 at Tyseley and first public operation was on 25-27 May at the steam gala of the Gloucestershire Warwickshire Railway, where it was based from 2025. 6880 then entered regular service and subsequently visited 2 more heritage railways in 2024 and a further 6 in 2025.

=== Parts used in construction ===
- Frames: Cut from new metal.
- Boiler: From GWR 6959 "Modified Hall" Class No. 7927 Willington Hall, restored to operational condition for the first time since 1960 with help from a £225,000 donation appeal.
- Driving wheels: The spare wheelsets for GWR 4300 Collett "Mogul" Class No. 7325, on long-term loan agreement from the Severn Valley Railway Society. These wheels were re-tyred at the South Devon Railway.
- Front bogie: Borrowed from GWR 4900 Class 5952 Cogan Hall; restored at Williton works on the West Somerset Railway
- Cylinders: Casting and machining of a new pair of cylinders, estimated cost of £60,000
- Tender: 6880 has used a number of tenders in the time it has been in steam. As of 2024, it is temporarily using a 3500 gallon Churchward tender from 7822 Foxcote Manor. The 6880 project intends to construct a new 3500 gallon Collett tender for permanent use with Betton Grange.
- Cab: Cut from new metal

=== Project milestones ===
- 1998: Project started.
- 2004: Frames cut.
- April 2013: The engine's frame is fitted to its driving wheels.
- June 25, 2018: Engine moves to Tyseley Locomotive Works in preparation for fitting the boiler.
- December 2018: Engine's boiler trial fitted.
- March 2020: Boiler lifted into Frames.
- April 2024: 6880 moved under its own steam for the first time after more than 25 years of work.

== See also ==
- Locomotives of the Great Western Railway § New-build steam
  - 1000 Class 1014 County of Glamorgan
  - 2900 Class 2999 Lady of Legend
  - 3800 Class 3840 County of Montgomery
  - 4700 Class 4709
- Steam locomotives of the 21st century
  - LNER Peppercorn Class A1 60163 Tornado
  - LBCSR Class H2 32424 Beachy Head
  - LMS Patriot Class 5551 The Unknown Warrior
  - Pennsylvania Railroad 5550
