= GWR 4900 Class 5952 Cogan Hall =

Preserved British steam locomotive

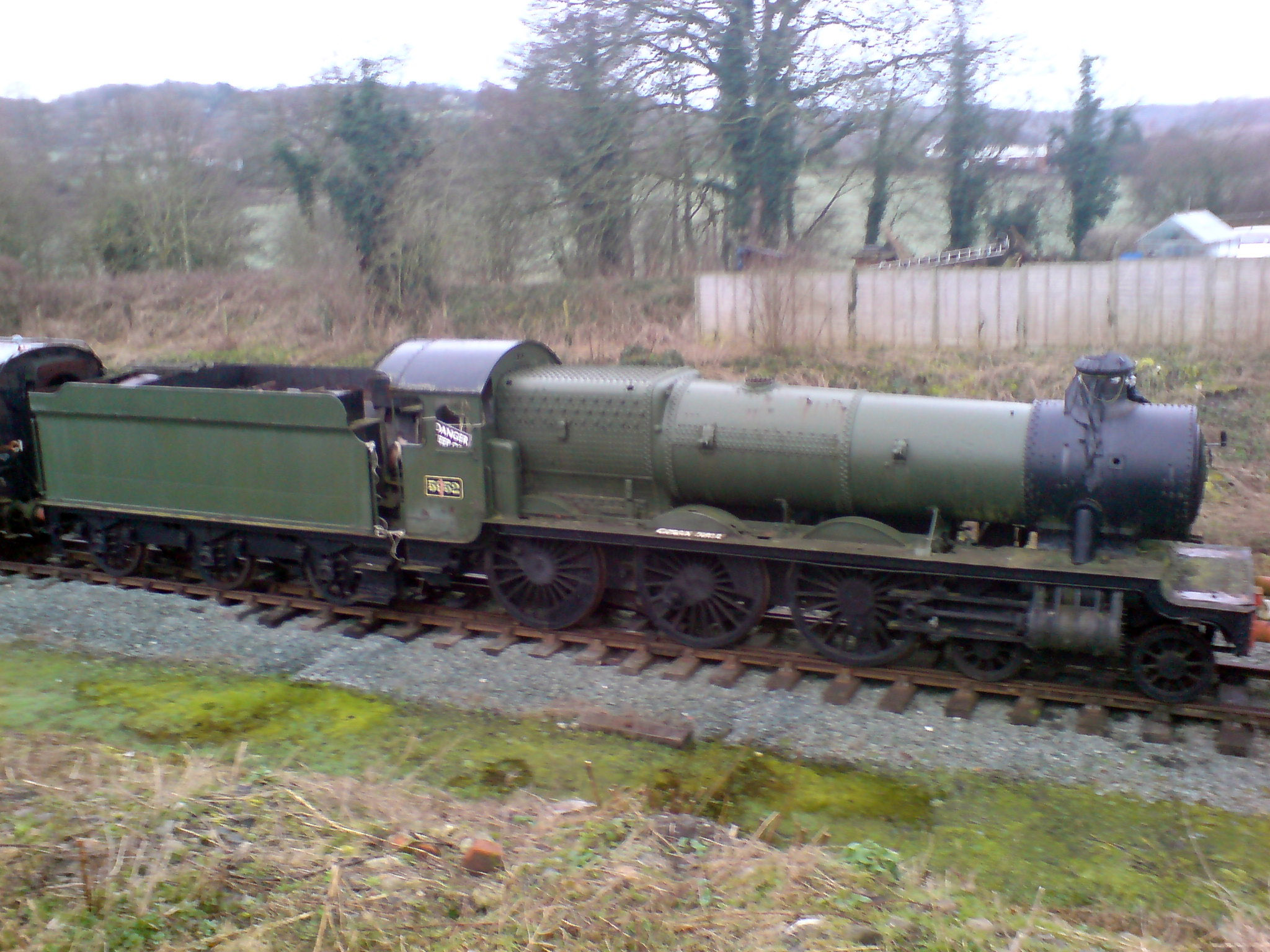
5952 Cogan Hall at Llynclys Station, April 2007

GWR Hall Class 5952 Cogan Hall was built at Swindon, England, in December 1935. As a mixed traffic engine, it hauled both passenger and freight trains. Its first shed allocation was the Penzance depot in Cornwall. In August 1950 it moved to Old Oak Common. During this time it was fitted with a three row superheater. In March 1959 it moved again to the Worcester depot. Its last shed allocation was to Cardiff East Dock before it was withdrawn from duties in June 1964.

The engine ended up at Woodham Brothers scrapyard in Barry, South Wales, and thus survived into preservation unlike some of its other classmates. Purchased by a private individual, Ken Ryder, 5952 Cogan Hall was the 136th departure from Barry in September 1981. It is one of only 11 of its class that survived into preservation.

Stored initially at the Gloucestershire Warwickshire Steam Railway (GWSR) at Toddington and later at the Cambrian Railways Trust, the intention was to restore 5952 at their Oswestry site. However, in 2010, it was sold to the Betton Grange Society, who intend to use its bogie and tender for the new-build loco. In the long-term, the Society hopes to restore the engine at its new home on the Llangollen Railway, once work on the Grange is complete. In March 2021, the 6880 Betton Grange Society announced that the Tyseley Locomotive Works would be the permanent home for 5952 Cogan Hall and 6880 Betton Grange.
