= LMS Patriot Class 5551 The Unknown Warrior =

Replica steam locomotive under construction for the LMS Patriot Project society

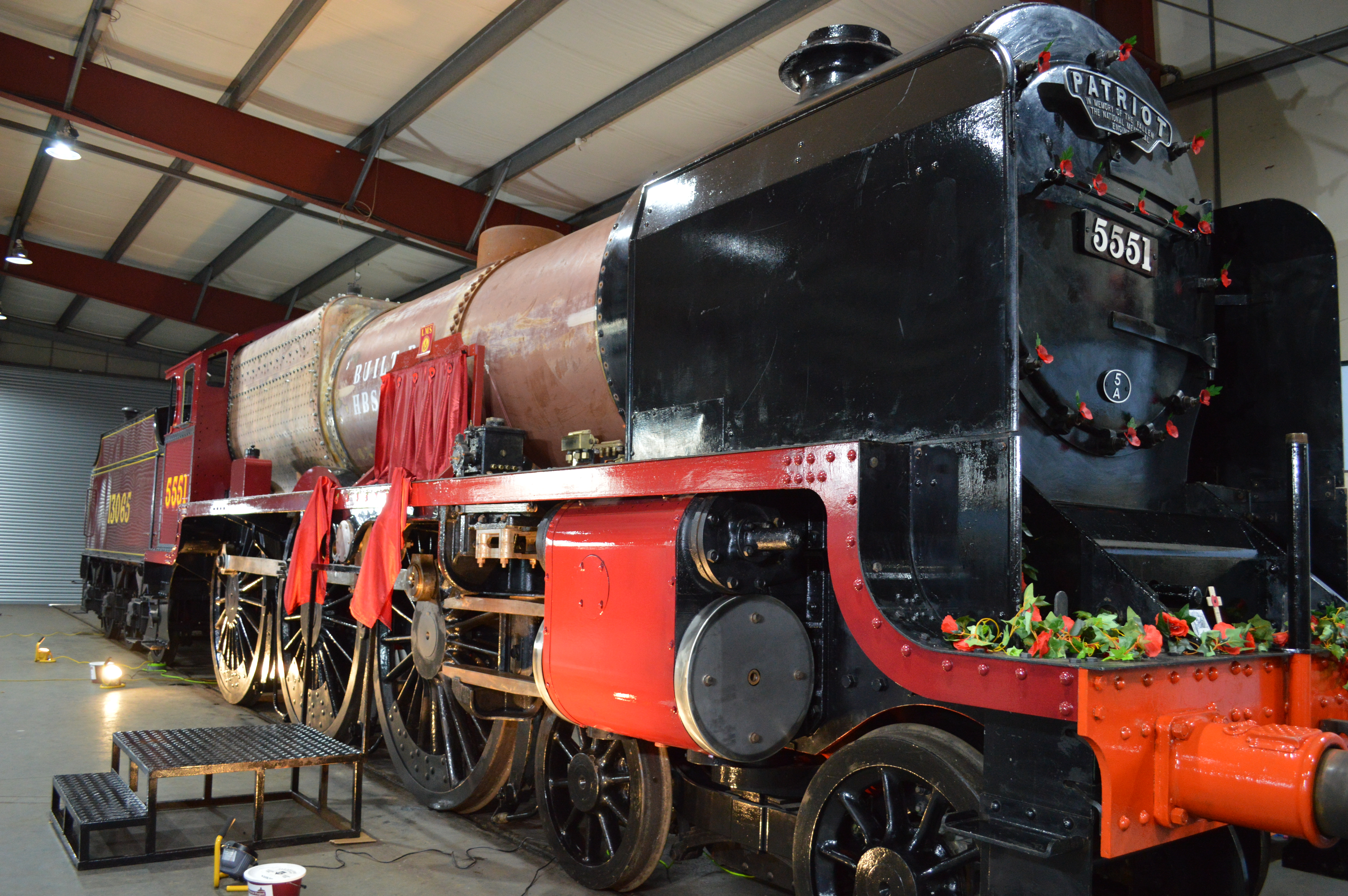
- An almost complete looking 5551 inside the shed at Crewe Heritage Centre. On this day it was to have its new crest unveiled.
Type and origin
- Power type: Steam
- Designer: Sir Henry Fowler (original designer)
- Builder: Crewe Works (original), The LMS Patriot Project (rebuild)
- Build date: May 1934 (original); 2008–present (rebuild)
Specifications
- Configuration
  - Whyte: 4-6-0
  - UIC: 2′C h2
- Gauge: 4 ft 8 1/2 in (1,435 mm) standard gauge
- Leading dia.: 3 ft 3 in (0.991 m)
- Driver dia.: 6 ft 9 in (2.06 m)
- Length: 62 ft 8 3/4 in (19.120 m)
- Loco weight: 80.75 long tons (82.05 t; 90.44 short tons)
- Tender weight: 42.70 long tons (43.39 t; 47.82 short tons)
- Total weight: 123.45 long tons (125.43 t; 138.26 short tons)
- Fuel type: Coal
- Fuel capacity: 5.5 long tons (5.6 t; 6.2 short tons)
- Water cap.: 3,900 imp gal (18,000 L; 4,700 US gal)
- Firebox
  - Grate area: 30 1/2 sq ft (2.83 m^{2})
- Boiler: G9½S
- Boiler pressure: 200 psi (1.4 MPa)
- Heating surface
  - Firebox: 183 sq ft (17.0 m^{2})
  - Tubes and flues: 1,552 sq ft (144.2 m^{2})
- Superheater
  - Heating area: 365 sq ft (33.9 m^{2})
- Cylinders: 3
- Cylinder size: 18 in × 26 in (457 mm × 660 mm)
- Valve gear: Walschaerts
- Valve type: Piston valves
- Train brakes: Vacuum (primary), Air
Performance figures
- Tractive effort: 26,520 lbf (118.0 kN)
Career
- Class: Patriot Class
- Numbers: 5551 (LMS); 45551 (British Railways); 98651 (TOPS)
- Official name: The Unknown Warrior
- First run: May 1934 (original), TBC (rebuild)
- Retired: June 1962 (original)
- Disposition: Original locomotive scrapped, rebuilt under construction

LMS Patriot Class No. No. 5551 The Unknown Warrior is a new build 4-6-0 steam locomotive under construction at Tyseley Locomotive Works in Birmingham, England. It will be a replica of the final Patriot Class locomotive that was built in 1934 to a design by Henry Fowler for mainline operation on the London, Midland and Scottish Railway (LMS) which was also numbered No. 5551, but never received a name. The last Patriot Class locomotives that were not modified into the LMS Rebuilt Patriot Class were withdrawn in 1962 and scrapped, with none surviving into preservation.

The LMS Patriot Project launched in 2008 and is expected to be completed in 2027, after which No. 5551 will run on heritage railways and the British mainline.

== Original engine ==
The original 5551/45551 was built at Crewe Works in May 1934 and unlike many other members of its class which were given names, it alongside nine other class members was not named. Sheds that it was allocated to over the years included: Crewe North (5A), Carlisle Upperby (12B), Camden (1B), Willesden (1A) and Edge Hill (8A). Edge Hill was the last shed it was allocated to, being transferred there in June 1961 and remaining there for twelve months until withdrawal.

It was also one of thirty four members of its class to be kept in its original unrebuilt condition prior to its final withdrawal in June 1962, its final working life was twenty eight years and one month. It was later cut up for scrap in October of the same year at its birthplace Crewe Works.

== Replica ==
=== Overview ===
The LMS-Patriot Project, a registered charity in England and Wales (No. 6502248 / No. 1123521), is constructing a replica locomotive at Tyseley Locomotive Works.

As of April 2017 the project engineering update showed that the engine has had its wheels fitted and also the brake system, pistons, valves, motion plus boiler are all being worked on. In November it was announced by the group who were building "The Unknown Warrior" that there had been a few problems arising with the Royal British Legion who were supporting the construction of the engine, and with deep regret it was announced that the RBL could no longer support the loco group which also meant that the RBL's crest above the engines nameplates would have to be removed. A new set of crests would be placed above the engines nameplates as a result but the RBL will still support the Patriot project and vice versa as its still planned for the completed engine to be known as "The National Memorial Steam Engine".

In October 2018 the Llangollen Railway, where the locomotive had been assembled to date, announced that they were no longer able to build 5551, the decision being made due to the length of the list for the railways own locomotives that needed overhauls and repairs undertaking alongside other new build locomotive projects at the line including 6880 Betton Grange. The locomotive was then moved to PRCLT's west shed on the Midland Railway near Butterley. An invitation to tender had been sent to four contractors who have expressed interest. The Princess Royal Class Locomotive Trust was chosen as they were deemed to best fit the requirements of 5551's board. Construction of the engine's boiler is now being undertaken at Heritage Boiler Steam Services Ltd in Liverpool.

In December 2023 the locomotive and project was transferred to Tyseley Locomotive Works, where assembly will continue.

=== Name, number and liveries ===
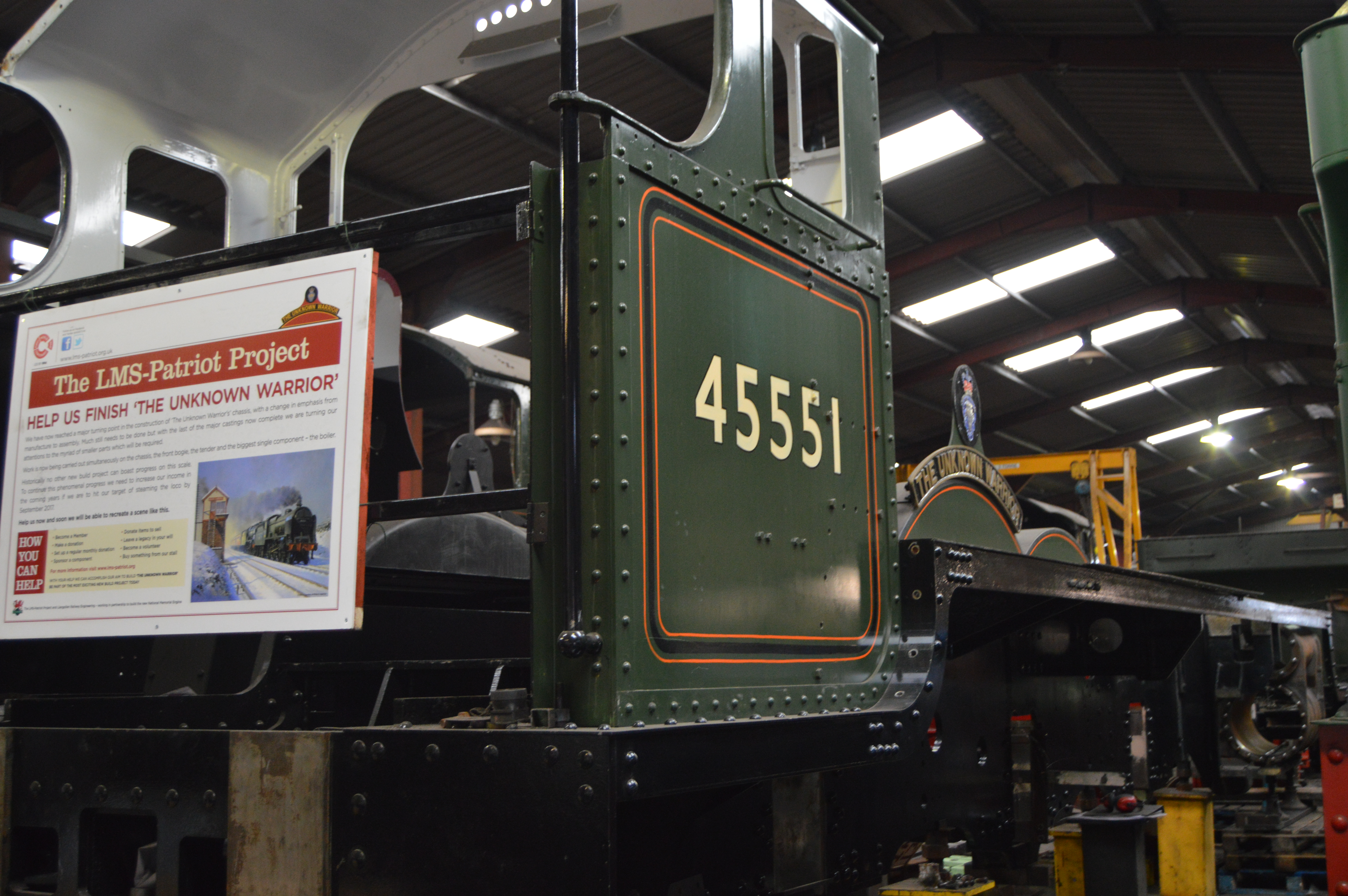
The chassis of The Unknown Warrior inside the shed at Llangollen, the firemans side of the cab was painted in BR Lined Green.

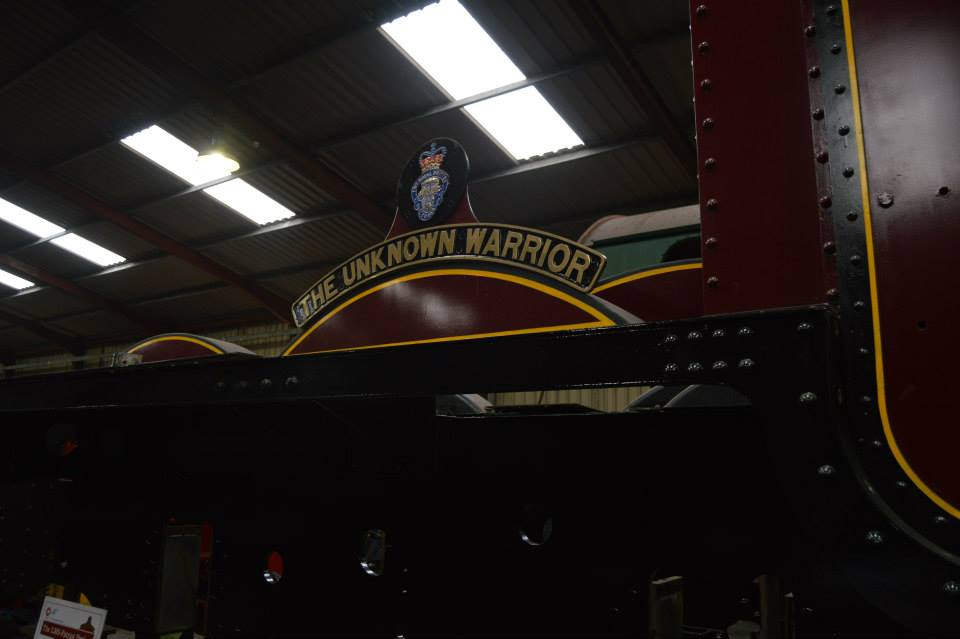
The Unknown Warrior's driver side nameplate with the RBL (Royal British Legion) crest placed above the nameplate.

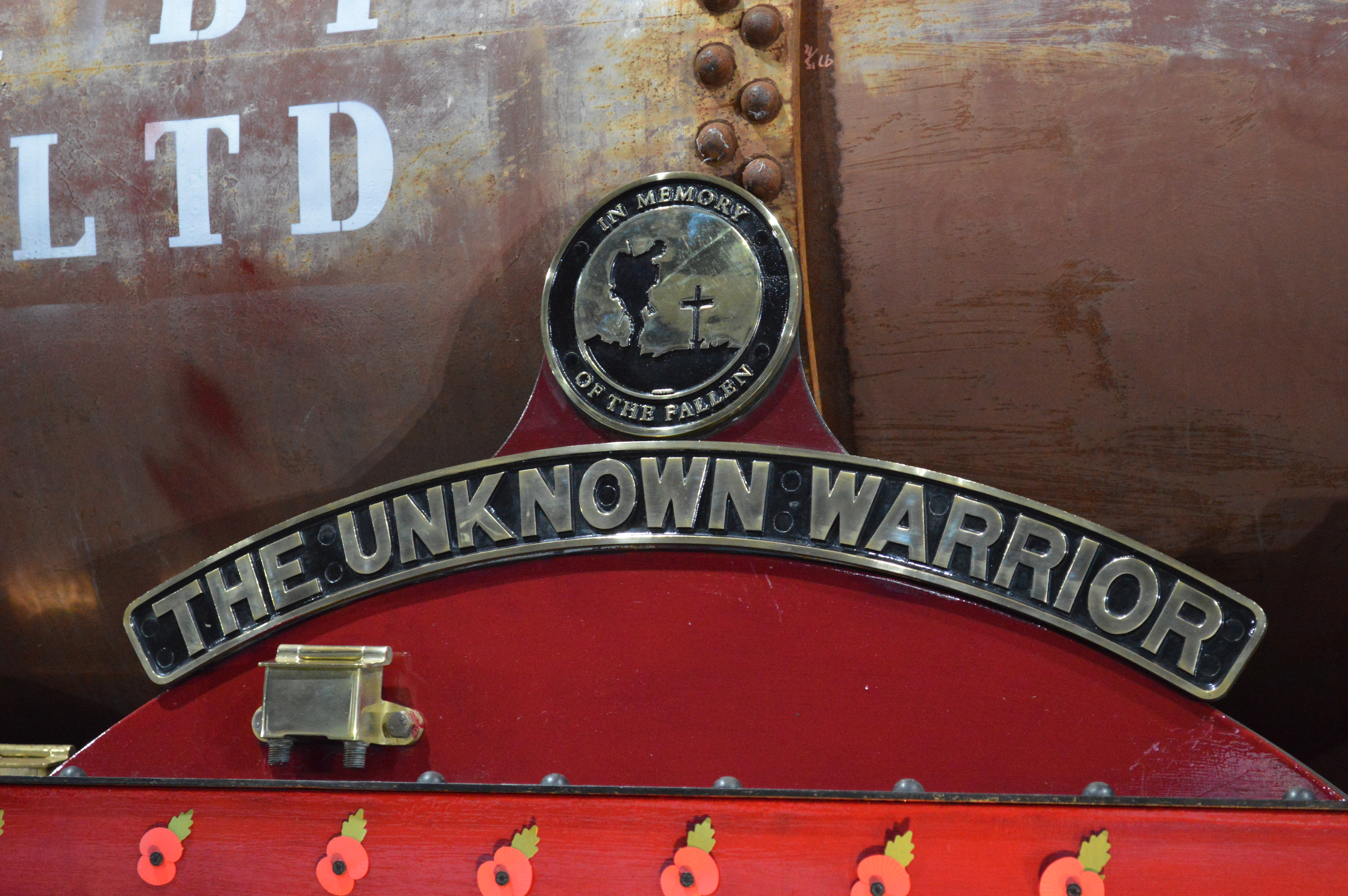
The Unknown Warrior's drivers side nameplate with the new crest placed above it replacing the RBL's crest which needed to be removed.

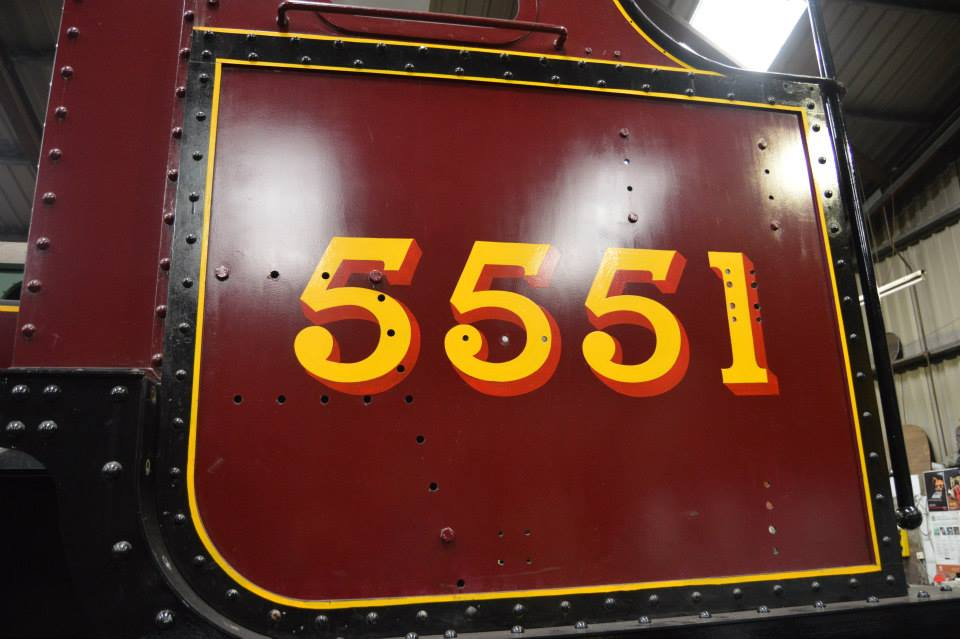
5551's drivers side cabside painted in its former LMS colours of crimson lake.

The original 5551/45551 never carried a name during its career under LMS & BR ownership, a competition was set up to choose a name for the new engine with examples of nameplates being: Patriot, Hero, Remembrance, Wilfred Owen, British Legion and The Falklands. Alongside names based on regiments, the military & war heroes there were other names entered into the competition which included: Henry Fowler, Winston Churchill, Sir Edward Elgar, Fred Dibnah, Robert Riddles, Baby Scot (nickname for class), Jack Mills (Great Train Robbery), Crewe & Llangollen. Following a public vote to decide on the engines' name, the engine was named "The Unknown Warrior", after the tomb in London which holds an unidentified soldier who was killed on the battlefront during the First World War. It was also decided for the engine to carry the Royal British Legion's crest above its nameplates. Following a request by the RBL their crest had to be removed from the engine, a replacement crest was unveiled during a recent event in Crewe.

The liveries that the original Patriots wore included: LMS Crimson Lake, LMS Black, BR Black & BR Green. For a while during the locomotive's construction, the engine wore crimson lake on the left side of its cab and BR Green on the right, this being to give an idea to the public of what it would look like in either livery when completed and running. It was announced in November 2016 during the Patriot Group's annual meeting at Crewe Heritage Centre that the first livery that "The Unknown Warrior" would wear on completion would be LMS Crimson Lake, with the three remaining liveries applied at later dates.

=== Project launch ===
The project was formally launched at the Llangollen Patriot Gala in April 2008, by the project's first commercial sponsor, John Buxton, Managing Director of Cambrian Transport. The Frames Appeal was also announced at the gala and a membership scheme was later launched.

=== Project milestones ===
- Jan/Feb 2008: Name "The Unknown Warrior" chosen by public poll
- August 2008: Project Launched by John Buxton
- March 2009: Cutting of frames commenced
- November 2009: First nameplate unveiled by The Royal British Legion
- 2010: First driving wheel cast
- December 2010: Patriot Project acquired tender for engine
- December 2011: Loco's dragbox completed
- July 2012: Second tender acquired
- November 2013: Engine visited the National Memorial Arboretum
- August 2014: Engine attended the Great Dorset Steam Fair
- 2014: First parts of engine's boiler ordered
- May 2015: LMS Fowler 2-6-4T no 42424 announced as next project after "The Unknown Warrior"
- 2015: Engine visited Barrow Hill Roundhouse for the first time
- January 2016: Construction of engine's boiler started at Crewe Heritage Centre
- March 2016: Galatea Locomotive Trust to fund engines mainline equipment
- November 2016: Loco's first livery confirmed as LMS Crimson Lake
- November 2017: Replacement contractor for boiler construction announced
- November 2017: Engine's boiler moved to Butterley from Crewe
- December 2017: Construction of engine's boiler re-started
- February 2018: Inner firebox put together
- May 2018: Foundation ring trial fitted
- May 2018: Return cranks delivered to Llangollen
- June 2018: Frames became rolling chassis
- July 2018: Boiler crown stays completed
- July 2018: Replacement nameplate crest chosen
- August 2018: Inner firebox trial fitted to outer wrapper
- October 2018: Construction of engine moved to Crewe Heritage Centre
- November 2018: Boiler trial fitted to frames
- November 2018: Replacement crest unveiled to public
- August 2019: Loco moved to Midland Railway for completion of construction
- June 2021: New axle material supplier found for steam locomotive
- June 2022: First replacement driving wheels cast

=== Construction ===
Although most parts that are being manufactured for "The Unknown Warrior" are brand new, a number of parts off fellow preserved engines will also be used. An example of parts that will be used in the construction of the Patriot include the leading front wheelset from LMS 8F 2-8-0 no 48518, a set of LMS Fowler Tenders (both of which being from Woodham Brothers scrapyard at Barry Island) are also going to be used in the project. Examples of new parts that will be constructed for "The Unknown Warrior" alongside the frame include the driving wheels and the second Fowler tender (the first having usable parts but not fit for re-use itself due to corrosion).

==== Frames ====
On 31 March 2009, two frame plates were cut at Corus Group plc Steel, Cradley Heath in the West Midlands. Measuring 39 ft in length 4 ft high and 1 1/8 in thick (28 mm), the frame plates were then taken to the Boro Foundry, at Lye, West Midlands, for machining and drilling, before being taken to the Llangollen Railway Works where assembly is in progress. The dragbox has been fitted to the frames, the front buffer beam fitted, the bogie bolster has been cast and has been fitted, all five of the five frame stretchers have been cast and are fitted to the frames.

==== Wheels ====
In September 2010, the first driving wheel was cast at the Boro Foundry, using the pattern made for LMS Jubilee Class 45699 Galatea. The two classes share the same size 6'9" driving wheels. The six new driving wheels have been cast by The Boro Foundry Stourbridge and machined and assembled by the South Devon Railway. In July 2021, it was reported that all six wheels had suffered from widespread metal fatigue cracking and would need to be replaced. They are set to be delivered in March 2026.

==== Boiler ====
At The LMS Patriot Project's 2010 AGM on 14 November, it was announced that the boiler for 'The Unknown Warrior' would be built by L&NWR Heritage at Crewe. The new boiler will be of traditional construction with a copper firebox. A fundraising campaign for the boiler for £1/2million has been launched. The smokebox and front tubeplate have been manufactured and were fitted to the locomotive in July 2013. The copper firebox was under construction at L&NWR Heritage at Crewe and was expected to be complete by the end of 2015, with construction of the boiler proper scheduled to begin in January 2016 with completion scheduled for the end of 2016. On 9 May 2017, L&NWR Heritage informed The LMS Patriot Project that it had decided to end all sub-contract work, and would not be completing the boiler. L&NWR Heritage did a little more work on the boiler, culminating in riveting the foundation ring to the inner firebox. The newly-formed Heritage Boiler Steam Services Ltd. was selected to complete the boiler, and on 30 November 2017 the partially-completed boiler was moved to HBSS' new facility.

=== Completion ===
The completion date was intended to be 2018 with a formal dedication planned for the 100th anniversary of the end of the First World War. That target was not met. It was later estimated that the locomotive might be in steam by late 2020. Again this was not met, not helped by the COVID-19 Pandemic.

The engine's full completion was then expected to be 2029 but during the society's AGM in 2023, it was decided that to save time and get the engine running two years earlier. To reduce costs, the project is now deferring certification of the locomotive to mainline standards with the required equipment not being fitted. The intention now is to get the engine running on heritage railways first and at a later date the engine will be completed to mainline standards with the fitment of AWS, TPWS, OTMR, GSM-R & Speedometer. 5551 is now expected to be completed by 2027.

== See also ==
- Steam locomotives of the 21st century
  - LNER Peppercorn Class A1 60163 Tornado
  - Pennsylvania Railroad 5550
  - GWR 6800 Class 6880 Betton Grange
