= A1 Steam Locomotive Trust =

UK charitable organisation

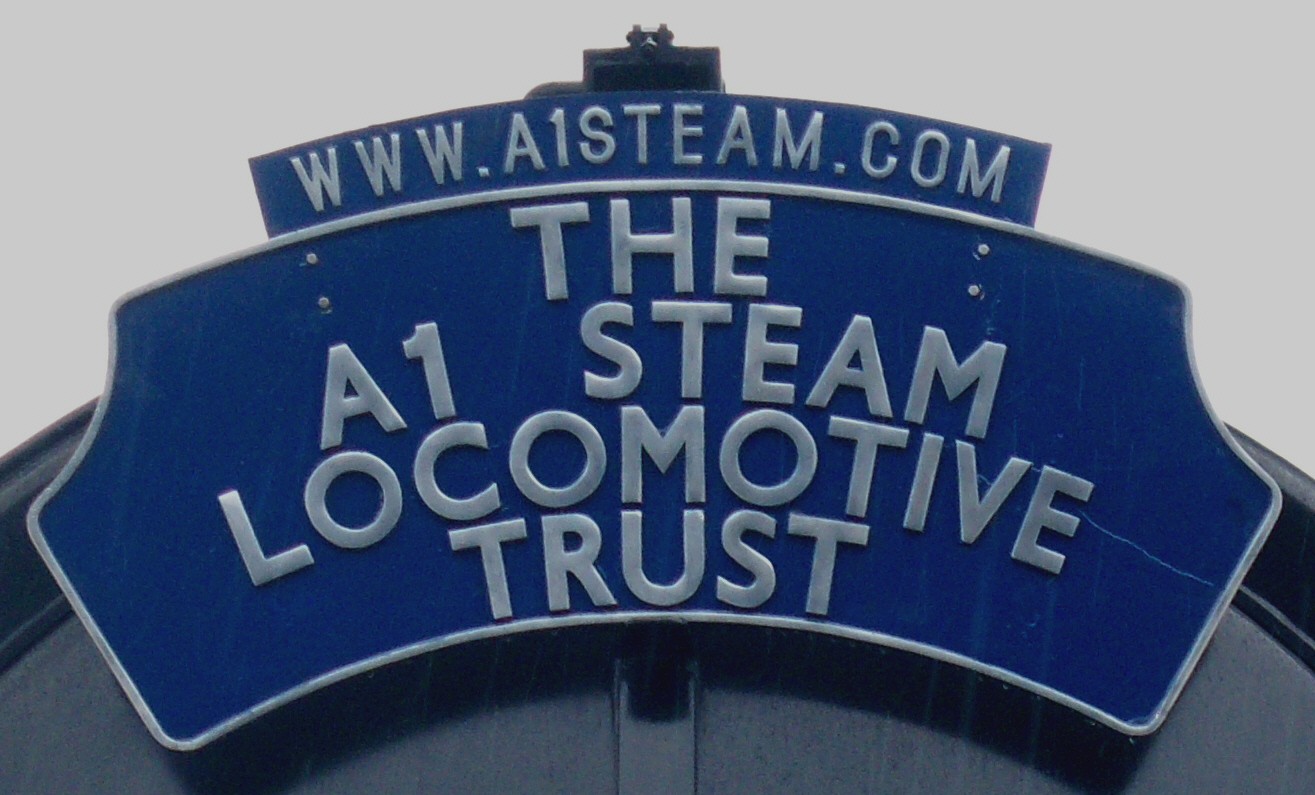
- The trust's headboard on Tornado
- Named after: LNER Peppercorn Class A1
- Formation: 17 November 1990; 35 years ago
- Type: Charitable trust
- Purpose: Recreation and Preservation of Steam Locomotives
- Location: Darlington, England
- President: Dorothy Mather
- Vice President: Peter Townend
- Chairman: Mark Allatt
- Subsidiaries: Locomotive Construction Co Ltd
- Website: a1steam.com

The A1 Steam Locomotive Trust is a Darlington, England based charitable trust formed in 1990 for the primary purpose of completing the next stage of the locomotive heritage movement, the building of a new steam locomotive from scratch (i.e. not a re-build of an existing locomotive). This project became the construction of 60163 Tornado, carried out by Locomotive Construction Co Ltd, a wholly owned subsidiary of the A1 Trust. After over 15 years of fundraising and construction, Tornado steamed for the first time in January 2008.

In contrast to various other heritage projects, with an eye to timely completion and full certification for main line use, the founding principles of the A1 trust were to treat funding as a priority and not a distraction, to use professionals in their fields for the various posts needed, and to use the engineering industry for all manufacturing to meet the needs of certification.

By October 1999, the trust had the largest numbers of supporters of any British locomotive owning group, and represented a 20th of all railway heritage group membership. Some of the sums raised by covenanting were "unheard of" from railway enthusiasts.

== History ==
The trust had its origins in an informal discussion in Darlington on 24 March 1990, discussing the feasibility of the project, followed by the first announced public meeting on 28 April that year, chaired by the first chairman, Mike Wilson. The trust was formally launched on 17 November 1990, to a meeting at The Railway Institute in York, followed by further presentations in London and Edinburgh.

In Spring 1993 the trust formed the Locomotive Construction Co Ltd, a wholly owned subsidiary of the trust, to build Tornado. In Summer 1993 the trust became the A1 Steam Locomotive Trust, a company limited by guarantee with charitable status. This was required to take advantage of the tax efficiency of covenants.

The trust held the first of what would become annual conventions at a Doncaster school on 17 September 1994, attended by 210 people. The trust went online in the autumn of 1996, and revamped their website in 2008.

The trust had a major crisis in 2001 when a volunteer made several allegations to covenantors regarding defects, over several months. The issue was resolved to the satisfaction of the trust's auditors, VAB and the Charity Commissioners, although the crisis was estimated to have cost £31,500 in lost income, £150,000 in management time, and a five-figure sum for an independent engineering survey. In addition, it was estimated to have put back the completion date for Tornado by two years.

== Tornado project ==
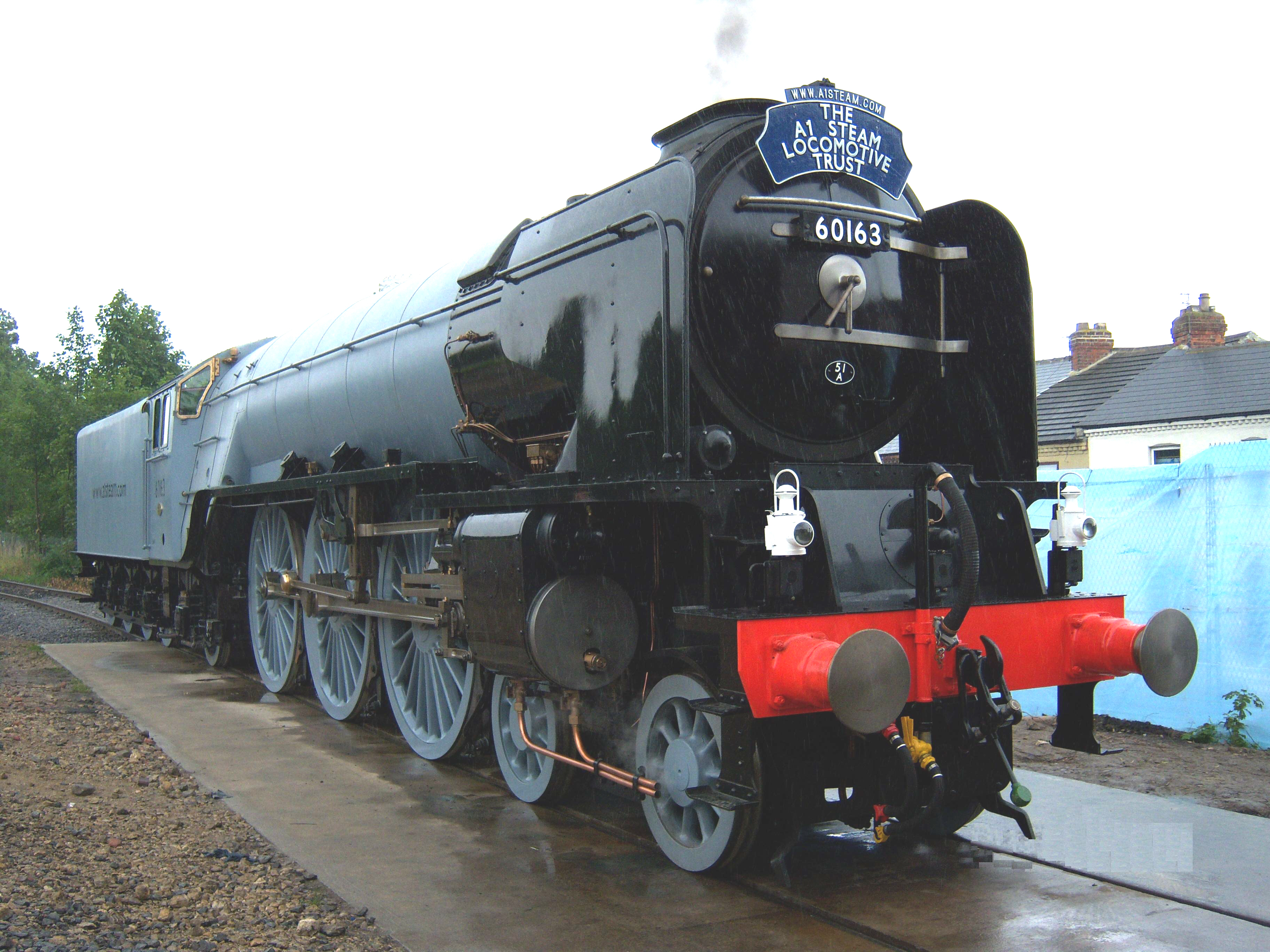
60163 Tornado, the brand new locomotive built by the Trust

The Tornado project aimed to complete the task of building the locomotive from scratch, with no recovered/restored parts, a feat never achieved in the preservation movement before, and not completed in Britain for a main line locomotive since 1960. This was considered by the trust to be the next logical step in the steam heritage movement, after the restoration of Standard 8P Pacific No. 71000 Duke of Gloucester, which due to its final state, had involved building a large quantity of new parts.

Building an A1, based on the LNER Peppercorn Class A1 would fill the 'missing link' in the otherwise preserved examples of East Coast Main Line traction, such as the Stirling Single, Ivatt Atlantics, LNER A4, A3 and A2 Pacifics, Class 40s and Deltics, and more modern examples.

The original target date for completion was 27 September 2007, the 175th anniversary of the opening of the Stockton and Darlington Railway, at a projected cost of £1.6m, with construction taking 10 years. With inflation and material cost increases, the actual spend has increased to £3m.

The trust has financed the Tornado project with a system of regular and one off covenants and industrial sponsorship, as well as negotiating generous terms from several manufacturers. Significant costs were saved in the project by securing parts from companies for free or at significant discount. The trust has also issued bonds to investors in return for financial contributions. Bond holders in return receive interest, and a repayment of the bond on maturity. By 2005 the trust's monthly income was over £10,000 and rising.

== Selecting a construction site ==
The original LNER Doncaster and Darlington works were ultimately self-sufficient, but no comparable locomotive workshops remain in the UK, so that the building of Tornado required the use of a large number of sub-contractors in varying locations, requiring multiple suppliers to build components such as the cylinders. Tornado would then be assembled at a site by the Trust. In Spring 1992 the trust announced that it intended to build Tornado in Britain, and not, as had been suggested, overseas, possibly in Poland, although possibly some parts would need to be built overseas.

In 1993 the trust signed an agreement with Doncaster council to build Tornado at an unspecified site in the town. The agreement with Doncaster council later broke down, so it was decided to begin construction at Tyseley Locomotive Works, beginning in 1995.

== Darlington Locomotive Works ==
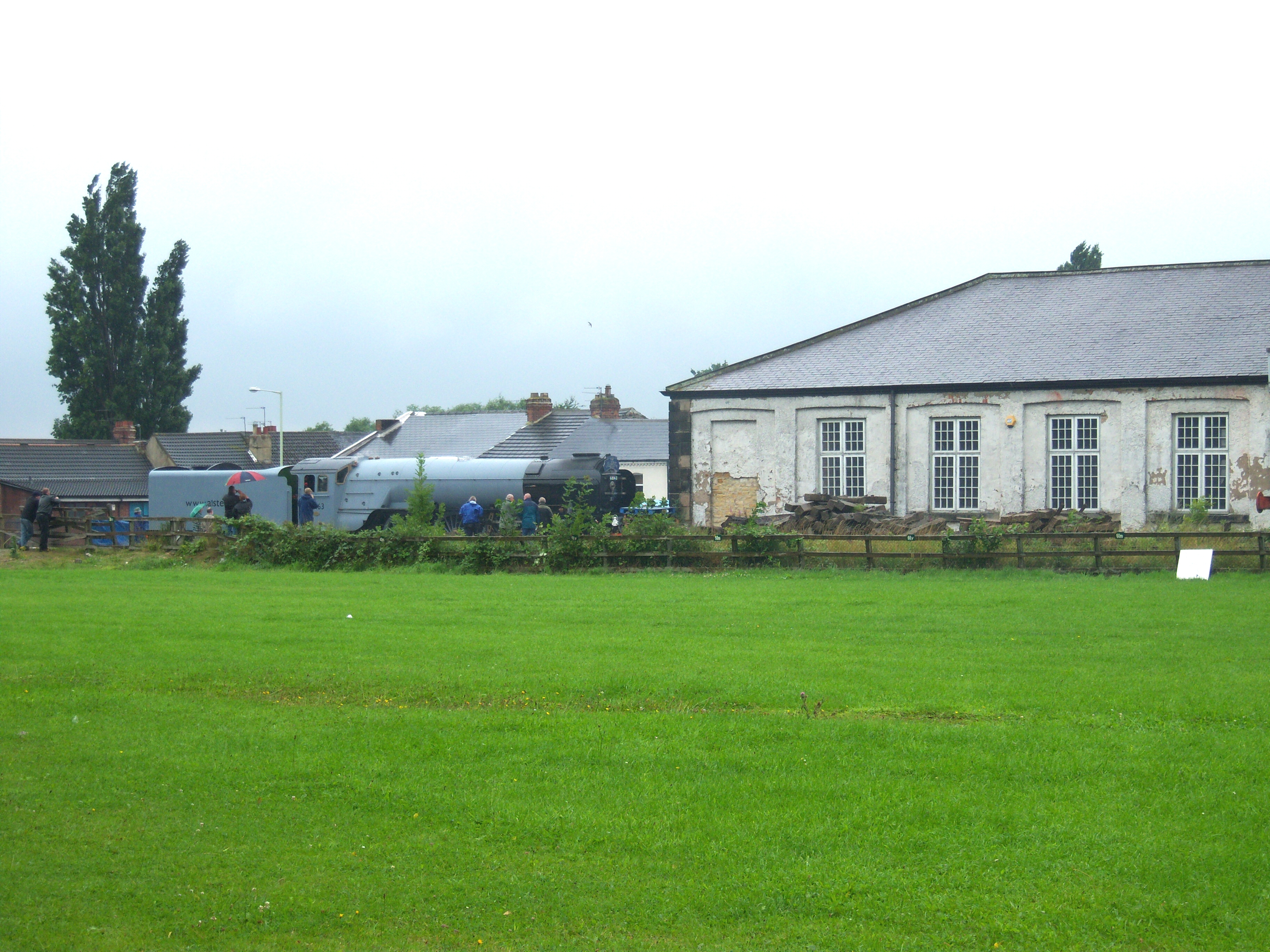
Tornado outside the works

The majority of Tornado was assembled at the Trust's Darlington Locomotive Works (54.535706°N 1.55658°W) in the northern suburbs of Darlington, a stone's throw from the original Darlington Works. The works occupy the southern half of the former Hopetown Carriage Works building, part of the Darlington Railway Centre and Museum (Head of Steam), situated alongside Hopetown Lane.

In 1995, Darlington borough council offered the trust use of the Hopetown carriage works, at an appropriately named Peppercorn rent. The trust named the Hopetown site as the Darlington Locomotive Works. The renovation of the building was assisted with £300,000 in European, National and local grants.

After nine months of conversion work, the Hopetown facility opened and became the Trust's centre of operations. This was timed in conjunction with the trust's fourth annual convention, with Tornado unveiled at the facility, having arrived from Tyseley two days earlier.

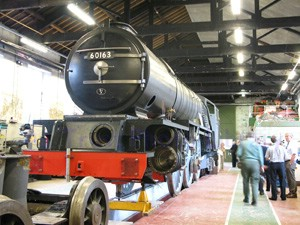
Tornado inside the works

In 2001, Darlington Borough Council decided to move the North Eastern Locomotive Preservation Group into the unrefurbished north end of the carriage works, meaning the trust consolidated in the southern half of the building. As such, the works consist of a space less than 30 metres long by 15 metres wide.

The A1 works are not rail connected. The now disused main line connection of the former carriage works entered from the northern end of the building. A dividing wall was built between the two uses.

The works contained a single ‘road’, a piece of track over an inspection pit allowing work underneath the locomotive. A £10,000 grant from Darlington borough council also allowed the purchase of a five-tonne crane and four hydraulic jacks.

The works also consisted of a specially laid straight piece of track extending the works road for approximately 500 feet (150 m) out of the works door. This was used to load and unload components from outside, conduct the boiler tests, and eventually conduct the first steam trials of Tornado.

The locomotive was constructed in the works road facing the dividing wall, with the tender frame being delivered outside and wheeled in to mate with the rear of the locomotive.

== Personnel ==
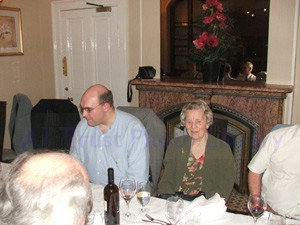
Dorothy Mather and Mark Allatt

Honorary Officers of the Trust include its president, Dorothy Mather (widow of the designer of the A1s A. H. Peppercorn) and the Vice President, Peter Townend, former Shed Master of the Kings Cross Top Shed, where his work brought him into contact with Peppercorn Class A1s in their running days.

Mather started the CNC plasma cutter that shaped the frame plates, lit the first fire in Tornado’s firebox, and was on the footplate for the inaugural run at Darlington works, stating "My husband would be proud."

Trust member Geoff Drury, who died in October 1999, was the previous owner of 60532 Blue Peter, the only other preserved Peppercorn Pacific and had also saved Gresley A4 4464 Bittern. An attempt had been made by enthusiasts including Geoff Drury to save the last remaining A1 Peppercorn, No. 60145 Saint Mungo, however the locomotive was scrapped in the autumn of 1966.

On 15 July 2000, chairmanship of the trust changed hands to the marketing director, city director and train enthusiast Mark Allatt, due to the ill health of the incumbent's wife.

== Talisman railtours ==
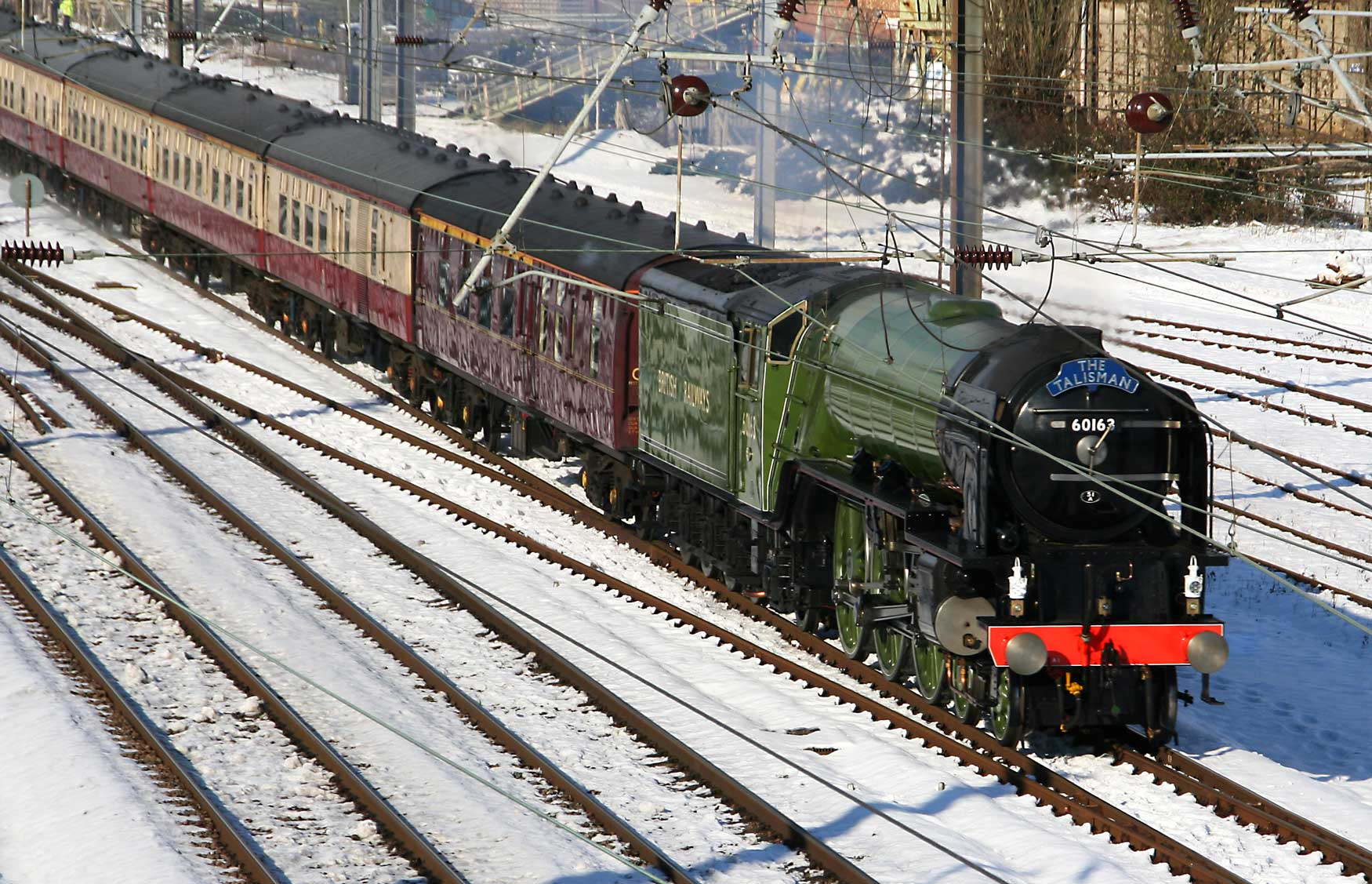
Tornado's first operation of the A1 Trust's Talisman tour, 7 February 2009

As part of the fundraising for the Tornado project, A1 Trust ran a number of railtours under The Talisman name, hauled by Duchess of Sutherland in 2005, Union of South Africa in 2006, and Bittern in 2008.

Tornado's first public run for passengers was the Talisman on 7 February 2009, from Darlington to London King's Cross. The trip was watched by thousands of spectators along the line and by a large crowd to greet her at King's Cross. This was a positioning run for later tours, with the train returning north by diesel.

== Other projects ==
=== Flying Scotsman tender ===
In the autumn of 1991, the trust attempted to buy the frames of the redundant second tender of Flying Scotsman, in order to use its frames for Tornado. In 1992, No. 5332 was acquired, one of the LNER's original ten 1928 corridor tenders. The tank was removed and the frames stripped in Morpeth. In 1998, due to the cost of overhaul, conversion for roller bearings, and the trust's desire to build Tornado out of completely new parts, it was decided to sell the Flying Scotsman tender frame back to its previous owners. This sale to Flying Scotsman Railways was completed in early 2000.

=== Other contracts ===
In 2000, the subsidiary company had sufficient capacity to accept an external order. This was an auxiliary tender chassis for Standard 8P Class Pacific No. 71000 Duke of Gloucester. This was to be the only external order as of 2008, due to the consolidation of the Trust in the southern half of the Hopetown works building, the Trust decided not to accept any more external work.

=== Support coach ===
In order to support the mainline operation of Tornado, the Trust purchased a support coach, a British Railways Mark 1 Brake First Composite (BCK) type, No. 21249, built at Swindon in 1961. It was purchased from being in storage at the northern half of the GCR at Ruddington. It was described as being in good structural condition despite being out of use for some time, with overhaul estimated to require additional funding of £50,000. It was to be moved to Darlington works in October 2008. It had previously been used on Steam Locomotive Operators' Association (SLOA) pullman trains in the 1980s, and was also at the Telford Steam Railway and Lavender Line heritage railways.

== Future projects ==
By 1998, with the state of the finances, it was speculated that if Tornado could be completed on time, all maintenance costs could be funded, and there could be a genuine possibility of a second locomotive being built. Subsequent delays and rising costs meant this became more unlikely.

As of 2000 the trust's chairman had expected other new build projects to have sprung up along the lines of the A1 Trust, however, despite 23 ideas of one form or another, only retro rebuilds such as GWR Saint had occurred. Lack of financial and project control were believed to be the difference between the trust and these other projects.

After construction of Tornado, £800,000 will still be required to service loans and bond issues.

However, on BBC Radio 4's You and Yours, current chairman Mark Allatt suggested that a further locomotive could be possible, saying "We've all got debts of £832,000, about half of which is a bond issue, and about half again of that is loans from individuals. Our business plan shows that if, as long as we continue with operating the tours we've planned to, and then our covenantors - who have been so generous over so long - stick with us, we can pay that back, and, the quicker we pay that back, the quicker we can start building a new engine".

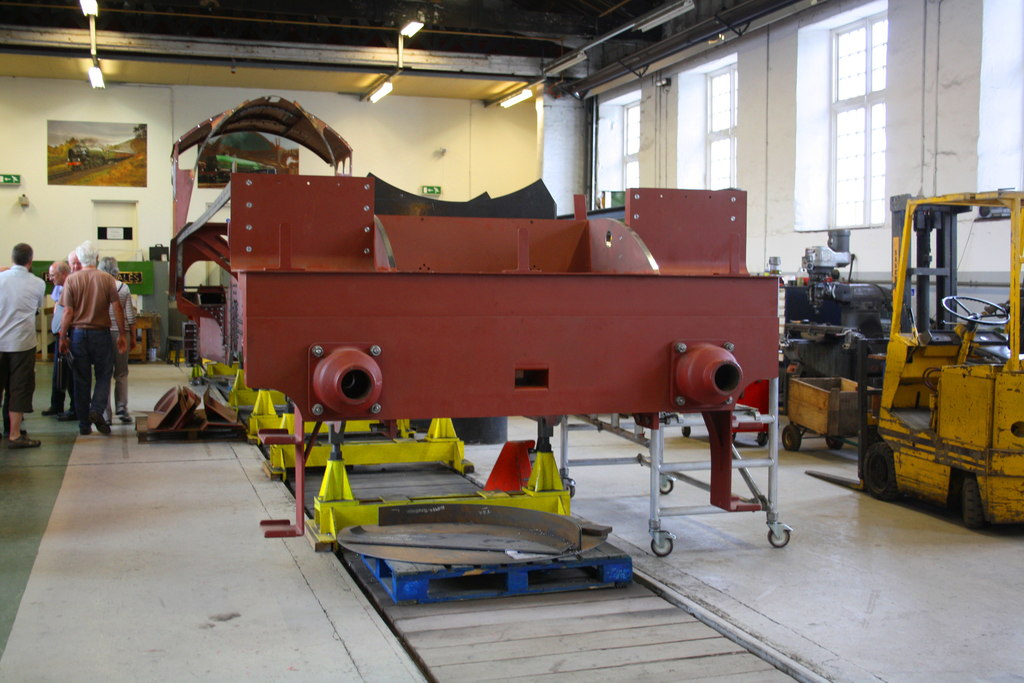
Frame of the P2 'Prince of Wales' at Darlington Railway Works

The A1 Trust is now producing a Gresley P2 numbered 2007 (the next in sequence) Prince of Wales. The P2s share around 70% of components used on Tornado. It will be made after the A1 Trust has enough money for Tornado future overhaul and debts repaid. Once work on the P2 class locomotive is complete, the trust will start construction on a new V4 numbered 3403 (the next in sequence) Highlander, followed by a new V3 and then a K3.

On Wednesday 13 August 2014, LNER Thompson B1 No. 61306 'Mayflower' was purchased by retired businessman David Buck from Neil Boden for an undisclosed sum. It was later announced that the locomotive would be managed on behalf by The A1 Steam Locomotive Trust. As of October 2014 however, the deal has fallen through, and 'Mayflower' will now be managed on behalf of West Coast Railway Company.
