= LNER Class V1/V3 =

Classes of 92 2-6-2T British steam locomotives

LNER Classes V1 and V3
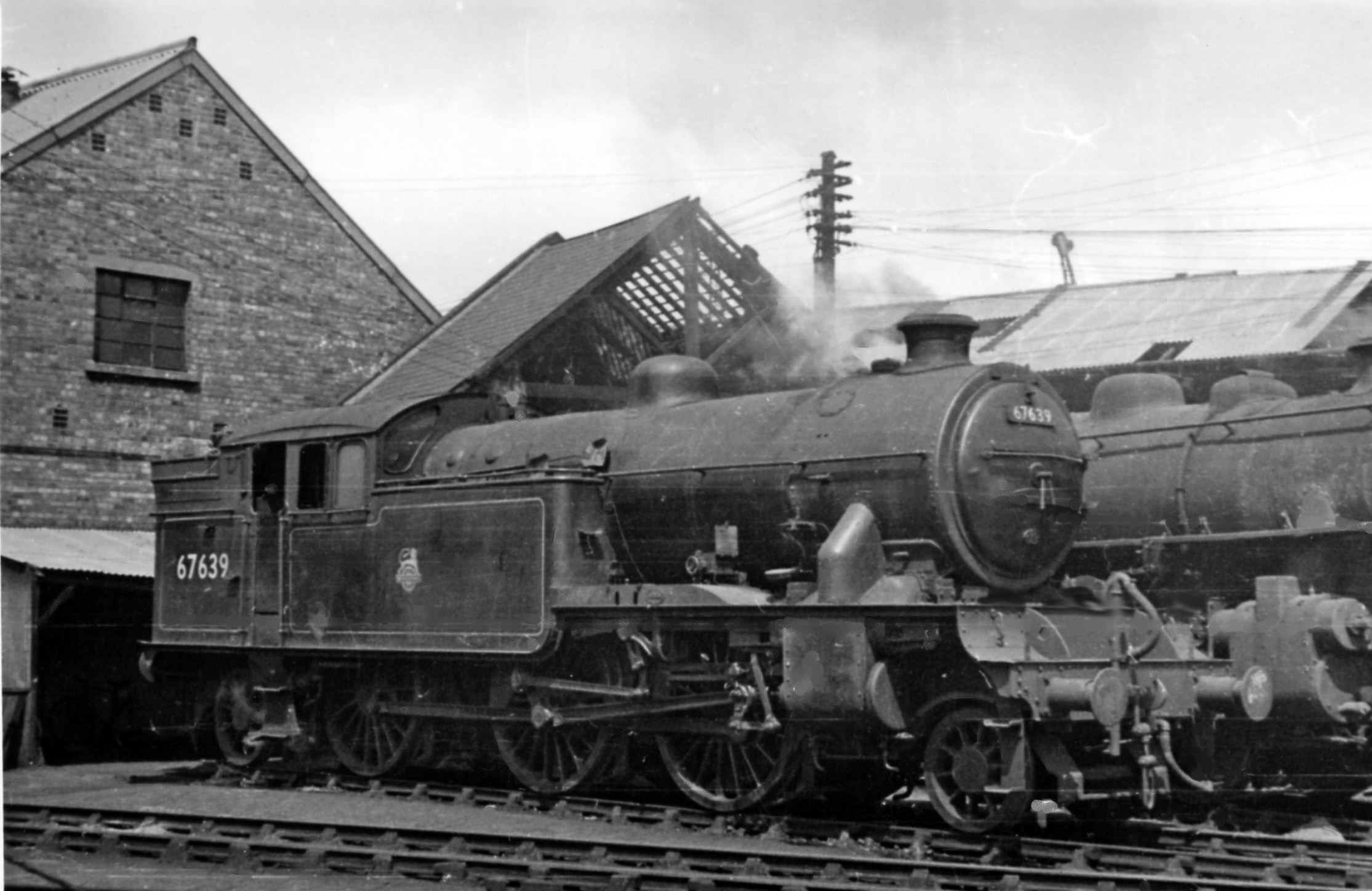
- V1 2-6-2T No. 67639 at Middlesbrough Locomotive Depot 1954
Type and origin
- Power type: Steam
- Designer: Nigel Gresley
- Builder: Doncaster Works
- Build date: V1: 1930–39; V3: 1939–40
- Total produced: V1: 82; V3: 10
Specifications
- Configuration
  - Whyte: 2-6-2T
  - UIC: 1′C1 h3t
- Trucks: Front: double swing link; Rear: radial
- Leading dia.: 3 ft 2 in (0.965 m)
- Driver dia.: 5 ft 8 in (1.727 m)
- Trailing dia.: 3 ft 8 in (1.118 m)
- Wheelbase: 32 ft 3 in (9.83 m)
- Axle load: V1: 19.25 long tons (19,560 kg); V3: 20.00 long tons (20,320 kg)
- Loco weight: V1: 57.05 long tons (57,970 kg); V3: 58.10 long tons (59,030 kg)
- Fuel type: Coal
- Fuel capacity: Original: 4 long tons (4,100 kg); With hopper-type bunker: 4.5 long tons (4,600 kg)
- Water cap.: 2,000 imp gal (9,100 L)
- Firebox
  - Grate area: 22.08 sq ft (2.051 m^{2})
- Boiler: 5 ft (1.52 m) diameter; Diagram 102
- Boiler pressure: V1: 180 psi (1.24 MPa); V3: 200 psi (1.38 MPa)
- Heating surface
  - Firebox: 127 sq ft (11.8 m^{2})
  - Tubes: 830 sq ft (77 m^{2})
  - Flues: 368 sq ft (34.2 m^{2})
  - Total surface: 1,609 sq ft (149.5 m^{2})
- Superheater
  - Type: Robinson
  - Heating area: 284 sq ft (26.4 m^{2})
- Cylinders: Three
- Cylinder size: 16 in × 26 in (406 mm × 660 mm)
- Valve gear: Outside: Walschaerts; Inside: Gresley derived motion
- Loco brake: Steam
- Train brakes: Vacuum
Performance figures
- Tractive effort: V1: 22,464 lbf (99.9 kN); V3: 24,960 lbf (111.0 kN)
Career
- Operators: London and North Eastern Railway; British Railways
- Power class: BR: 4MT; V1 downgraded to 3MT in May 1953
- Axle load class: V1: Route Availability 6 V3: Route Availability 7
- Withdrawn: 1953 (1), 1960–1964
- Disposition: All scrapped. New build planned

The London and North Eastern Railway (LNER) Class V1 and Class V3 were two classes of related 2-6-2T steam locomotive designed by Sir Nigel Gresley. A total of 82 V1s were built with 71 being rebuilt into the higher pressure V3s with an additional ten being built as V3s from the final batch of V1s. The V3 was a development of the V1 with increased boiler pressure and a resultant increase in tractive effort.

== Development history ==
The development of large tank engines was somewhat delayed by problems on the Southern Railway following the Sevenoaks derailment thought to have been caused by the instability of the large K class 2-6-4 tanks. Gresley carried out stability tests on one of these locomotives and finding no trouble and without further delay produced his sophisticated V1 class suburban tank in 1930. This incorporated his 3-cylinder system and was the first example of all three cylinders and valve chests being incorporated into a single steel casting; this arrangement was used for the P2 Cock o' the North and the subsequent V2, K4 and V4 types.

== Construction history ==
A total of 82 V1s were built at Doncaster from 1930 to 1939. The last batch of 10 engines ordered were built as V3s. By 1948, 4 V1s were rebuilt as V3s, and a further 67 would be rebuilt to V3 specification under British Railways ownership.

== Operational history ==
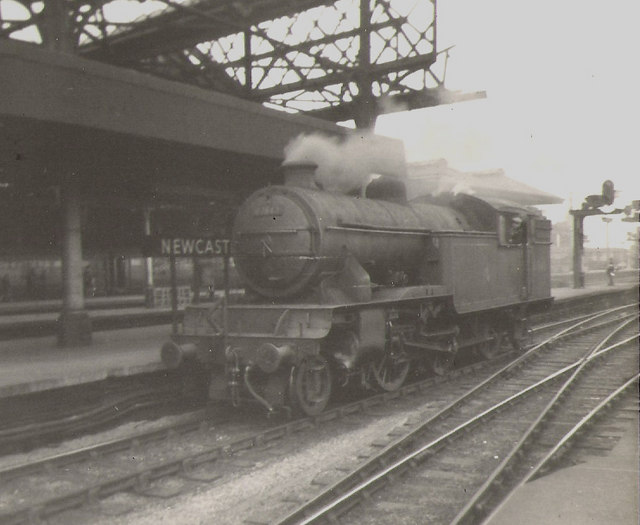
V3 tank on 'pilot' duty at Newcastle Central station

They were first used in Scotland on the Glasgow-Edinburgh - Helensburgh services. One, no 2911, was also tried in 1931 with excellent results on the Hitchin-London trains before returning to Scotland.

== Later development of the V3 ==
From 1939, with working pressure increased to 200 psi gave higher power and better acceleration. A number of V1s were rebuilt to conform. French-style hopper type coal bunker were also fitted. By 1956 there were 57 V1 and 35 V3 types in service, many on Newcastle-Middlesbrough services.

During World War II a number were transferred to help with the heavy wartime loads from the Royal Ordnance Factory at Thorp Arch until the end of the war.

The V1 and V3s were comparatively powerful engines suited to heavy and tightly timed suburban workings. As such they saw service on suburban services around Glasgow and Edinburgh. Several were also maintained at Hull for hauling suburban and branch-line workings in the area.

Some of the class were displaced by newer and more powerful Thompson L1 class. Withdrawals began in 1960, with the V1s being disposed of by 1962 and the V3s by 1964, as diesel multiple units took over increasing numbers of suburban services, and branch line workings became fewer as lines closed or were dieselised.

None of either class survived into preservation. However the A1 Steam Locomotive Trust announced in September 2018 that following on from the LNER Class V4 3403 project, a new V3 is planned to be built.

== Accidents and incidents ==
- On 8 September 1933, locomotive No. 2902 was hauling a passenger train that collided with wagons on the line at Bowling, West Dunbartonshire due to a signalman's error. Five people were injured.
- On 3 August 1942, No. 7669 was damaged during a bombing raid at Middlesbrough railway station.
- In December 1951, BR No. 67630 was involved in a collision at Craigentinny near Edinburgh, doing severe damage to its front and derailing the first coach. The engine stayed on the rails and no one was injured.

== Models ==
Bachmann produce models of both the V1 and V3 in 00 gauge in LNER green, BR Apple green and BR lined black.
