= LNER P2 Class 2007 Prince of Wales =

British steam locomotive under construction

LNER 2007 Prince of Wales
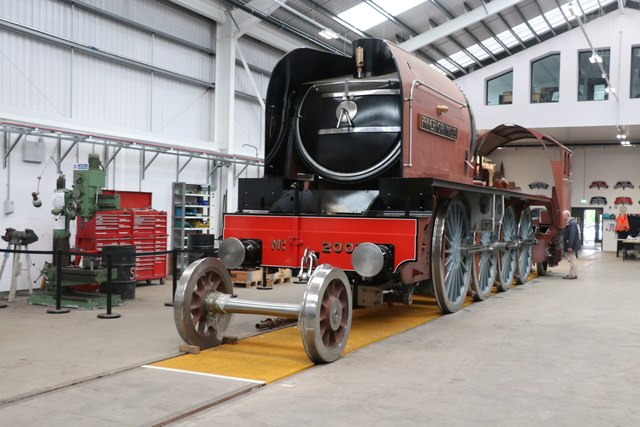
- No. 2007 at Darlington Railway Works in September 2024
Type and origin
- Power type: Steam
- Designer: Sir Nigel Gresley (original designer)
- Builder: P2 Steam Locomotive Company
Specifications
- Configuration
  - Whyte: 2-8-2
- Gauge: 4 ft 8 1/2 in (1,435 mm) standard gauge
- Leading dia.: 3 ft 2 in (0.97 m)
- Driver dia.: 6 ft 2 in (1.88 m)
- Trailing dia.: 3 ft 8 in (1.12 m)
- Loco weight: 110 long tons 5 cwt (247,000 lb or 112 t) max.
- Tender weight: 55 long tons 6 cwt (123,900 lb or 56.2 t) max.
- Fuel type: Coal
- Boiler pressure: 250 psi (1.72 MPa)
- Cylinders: Three
- Cylinder size: 19.75 in × 26 in (502 mm × 660 mm)
- Loco brake: Air (Vacuum for heritage railways)
Performance figures
- Tractive effort: 43,684 lbf (194.32 kN)
Career
- Numbers: 2007 (display); 98807 (TOPS)
- Disposition: Under construction

LNER Class P2 No. 2007 Prince of Wales is a 2-8-2 "Mikado" steam locomotive being built at Darlington Locomotive Works, England to an original design by Nigel Gresley, former Chief Mechanical Engineer for the London and North Eastern Railway (LNER). It will be the seventh member of its class and one of two P2s in existence, along with the replica of No. 2001 after the original six locomotives were converted to 4-6-2 LNER Thompson Class A2/2 engines by Gresley's successor Edward Thompson in 1943 and 1944. The original P2s were built between 1934 and 1936 and employed to haul heavy passenger trains on the LNER's Edinburgh to Aberdeen line, and were declared Britain's most powerful express passenger engines.

The A1 Steam Locomotive Trust announced the project in 2013, following the completion and success of its first new build project LNER Peppercorn Class A1 No. 60163 Tornado in 2008. Construction began in 2014 with its design based on P2 No. 2001 Cock o' the North with some modifications to address historic design problems, improve maintenance, and comply with modern railway standards. The boiler constructed at Meiningen Steam Locomotive Works in Germany was delivered to Darlington in December 2025. Prince of Wales is expected to be completed in 2027 at an estimated cost of £6 million, after which it will run on the mainline and heritage railways.

== Background ==
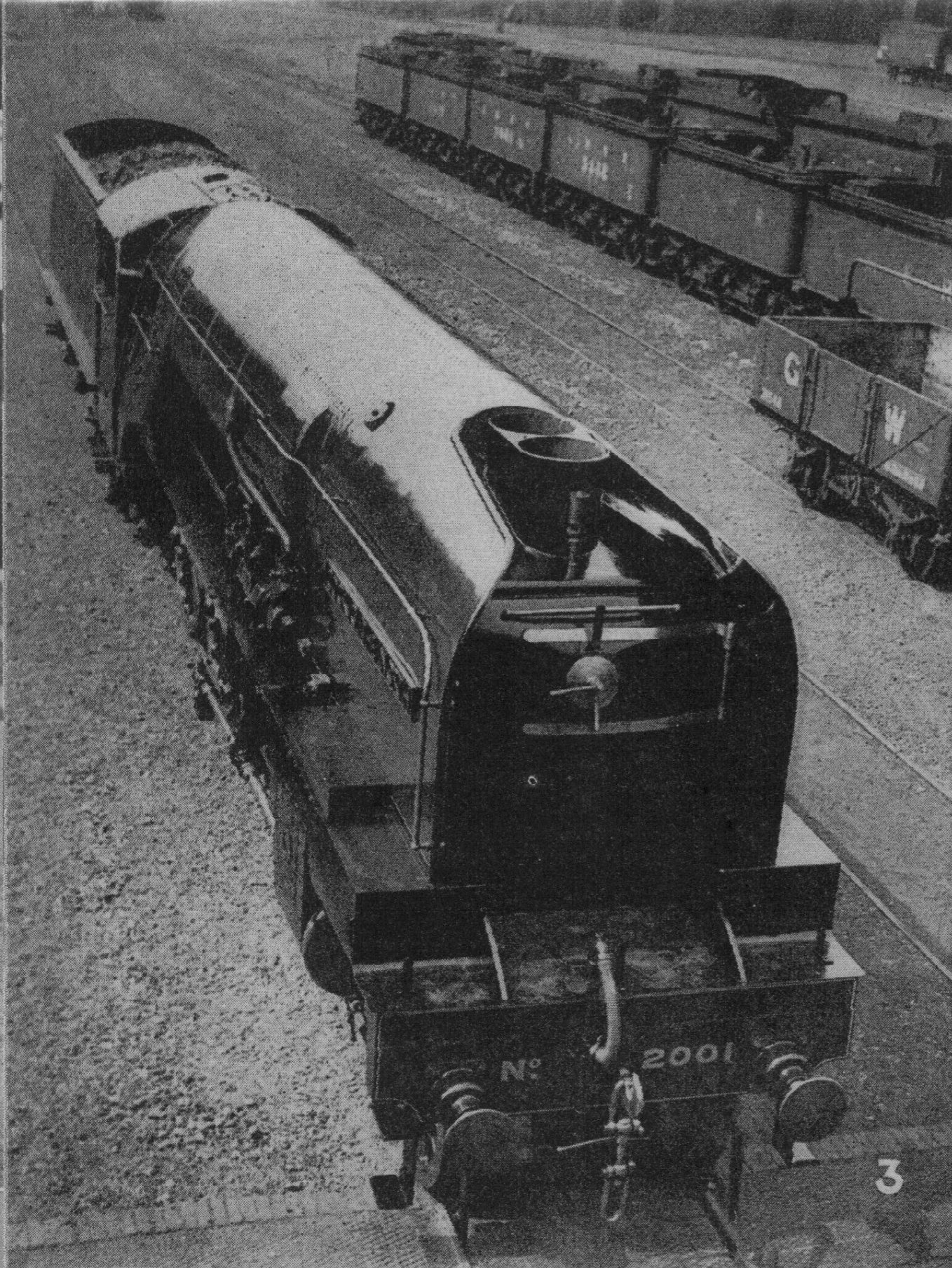
The first original P2, No. 2001 Cock o' the North

The original six Class P2 locomotives (Nos. 2001 to 2006) were built at Doncaster Works between 1934 and 1936 to a design by chief mechanical engineer Nigel Gresley. They were employed to haul express trains over the Edinburgh to Aberdeen line of the London and North Eastern Railway (LNER) and were the most powerful in Great Britain, capable of hauling 600-ton trains. However, restrictions brought on by World War II caused them to suffer mechanical problems during the 1940s, which contributed to the decision to rebuild the class into LNER Thompson Class A2/2s by Gresley's successor, Edward Thompson. The rebuilt engines were withdrawn between 1959 and 1961, and none survived into preservation.

In 2008, the A1 Steam Locomotive Trust completed its first new build steam locomotive project, the LNER Peppercorn Class A1 No. 60163 Tornado, which marked the first British mainline steam engine built since 1960. The success of Tornado gave the A1 Trust the opportunity to look into a second new build project. In December 2010, it announced its intention to conduct a feasibility study into building a seventh Class P2, the most frequently requested engine. The study included the examination of commercial, engineering, and certification challenges that may arise and discussions amongst the trust and regulatory bodies were "very positive". A 3D computer model of the P2 was created using original drawings kept in the National Railway Museum and used for track dynamic analysis using Tornado as the basis and track position data from Network Rail to validate the modelling data.

The project officially launched in September 2013. On 14 November, Prince Charles' 65th birthday, the A1 Trust announced that No 2007 would be named Prince of Wales. Despite Charles ascending to the throne in September 2022, the engine's name will not change.

== Design ==
Prince of Wales, like Tornado, will be built as a new member of its class rather than a replica. Its design is based on the original drawings of P2 No. 2001 Cock o' the North, but with extensive alterations to improve maintenance, lower life-cycle costs, address historic problems, and comply with modern operating requirements and standards. Modifications include roller bearings, an all-welded, all-steel boiler and Lentz poppet valve gear. The external appearance will match Cock o' the North in its original configuration before it was streamlined. Components in common with Tornado have been incorporated into Prince of Wales as a cost-saving measure. The A1 Trust estimates both locomotives will have about 70% of their parts in common, including the boiler and tender.

A1 Trust director of engineering David Elliott observed that the original P2s had several shortcomings, difficulties when traversing tight curves, and being prone to crank axle failures but was confident that these will be resolved by contemporary engineering techniques. To address crank axle fatigue failures, Finite Element Analysis has resulted in the axle diameter being increased to 10 inches (250 mm), compared the original 9 5/8 inches (240 mm). The curve problem was studied using Resonate Group's Vampire software to simulate the vehicle's rail dynamics. The simulation determined optimal coupled wheelset clearances and design of a pony truck with side-spring control.

The original P2 cylinder diameter of 21 inches (530 mm) is out-of-gauge where track has been positioned for a reduced platform gap. To avoid excessive route limitations, the cylinder diameter on Prince of Wales has been reduced to 19 3/4 inches (500 mm), and 3/4 inch (19 mm) was saved by using fabricated steel instead of cast iron for the cylinder block. To retain the same power output as the P2s, the boiler operates at 250 psi (1,700 kPa) instead of 220 psi (1,500 kPa). Because of improved heat treatment methods and modern tooling, a durable infinitely-variable cam can be used instead of the stepped cam adopted for the early P2s, enabling greater efficiency. Prince of Wales's boiler is 17 inches (430 mm) shorter than the original, and the smokebox is 17 inches longer. The change was made because the extra boiler length failed to raise extra steam as firebox gases cooled towards its far end and the longer smokebox will provide a larger vacuum reservoir to smooth exhaust pulses. The boiler is based on Tornado's as is the complex superheater header and electrical system. The sloped smokebox meant that the chimney on Prince of Wales required a unique casting.

== Manufacture ==
A Solidworks computer aided design (CAD) model was created for use in the manufacturing process. The frames have been built using CNC machines from the CAD data. Modelling data for Prince of Wales and a modified design with a LNER Class V2-type pony truck, was released in early 2013. In April 2014, construction commenced at Scunthorpe Steelworks, where the frame plates were rolled and flame profiled.

Construction was expected to take seven years, and the A1 Trust projected that the cost will be £6 million.

== Project milestones ==
- November 2013: 2007 to be named Prince of Wales.
- February 2014: James May creates 2007's smokebox door dart.
- April 2014: Frames cast at Tata Steel in Scunthorpe.
- June 2014: Driving wheels ordered.
- July 2014: Frames dedicated.
- October 2014: Roller bearings ordered.
- July 2015: 2007 construction 1/3 complete.
- October 2015: £2m raised in two years.
- March 2016: P2SLC launch "The Mikado Club".
- January 2017: James May makes slacking cock flange.
- May 2017: Tender frames ordered.
- October 2017: Campaign for 2007's boiler passes half way.
- January 2018: Campaign for 2007's cylinder block two-thirds completed.
- March 2018: Cylinder block fully funded.
- April 2018: Boiler half funded.
- April 2018: 2007's construction 40% funded.
- May 2018: Mikado Club reaches target.
- May 2018: Motion Components ordered.
- June 2018: 2007's tyres fitted.
- June 2018: Boiler tender issued.
- June 2018: Boiler cladding trial fitted.
- July 2018: Wheels arrive in Darlington.
- August 2018: Electrical equipment ordered.
- September 2018: V4 to be constructed after P2.
- September 2018: Wheelsets fitted to engine.
- October 2018: DB Meiningen to undertake boiler design.
- October 2018: First cylinder parts arrive.
- November 2018: 2007's construction 50% funded.
- December 2018: Construction progress.
- November 2019: Tender wheels delivered (Now awaiting balancing and roller fitting)
- March 2020: Tender tank delivered
- July 2023: Cylinder block partially finished and hydraulically tested
- December 2025: Boiler delivered from DB Meiningen in Germany
- July 2026: Cylinder block lowered onto the frames.
