= GWR 6800 Class =

Class of steam locomotive

Great Western Railway 6800 Class
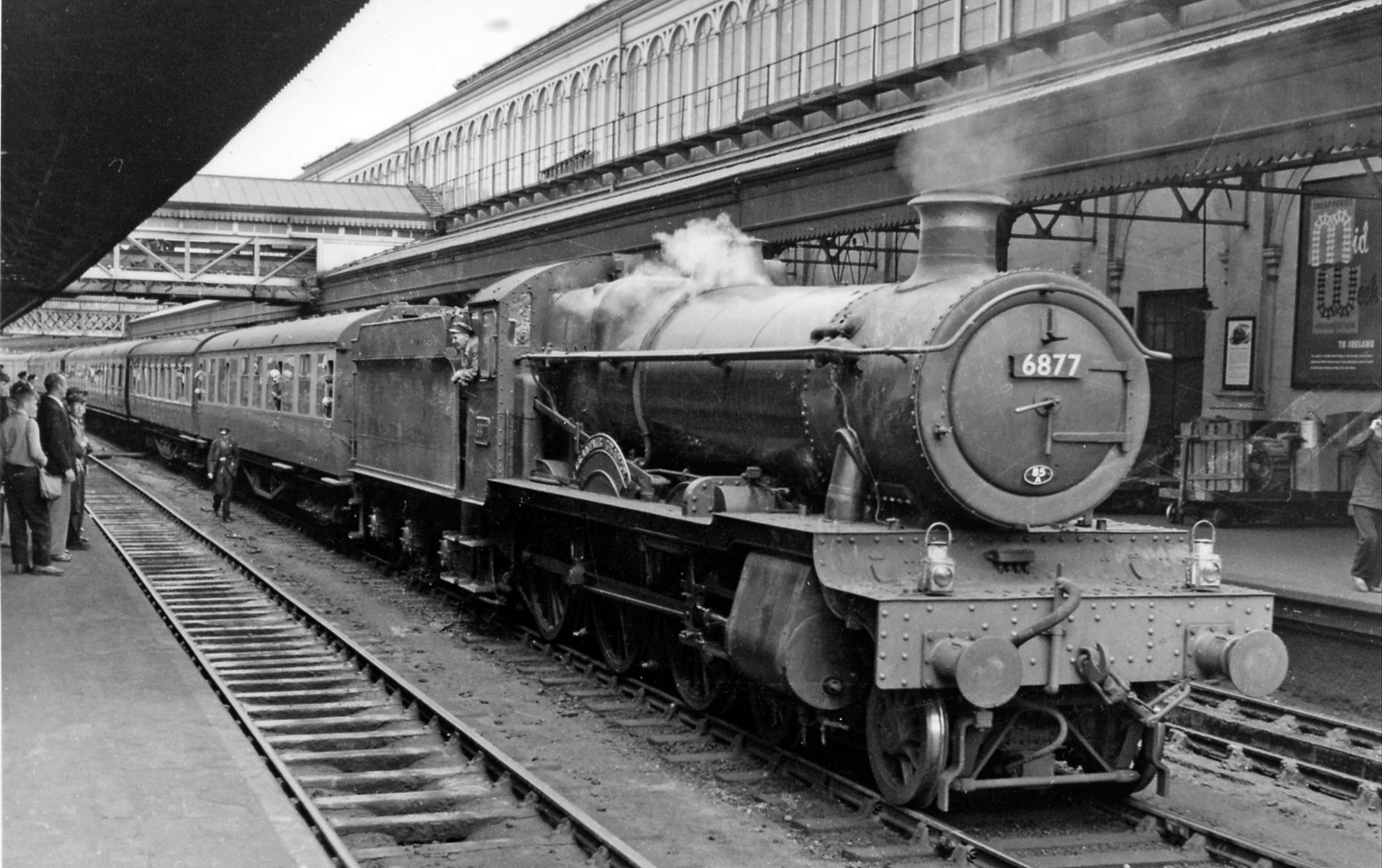
- 6877 Llanfair Grange at Exeter St Davids in 1958
Type and origin
- Power type: Steam
- Designer: Charles Collett
- Builder: Great Western Railway Swindon Works
- Order number: Lot 308
- Build date: 1936–1939, 2024
- Total produced: 80
Specifications
- Configuration
  - Whyte: 4-6-0
  - UIC: 2′C h2
- Gauge: 4 ft 8 1/2 in (1,435 mm) standard gauge
- Leading dia.: 3 ft 0 in (0.914 m)
- Driver dia.: 5 ft 8 in (1.727 m)
- Minimum curve: 8 chains (530 ft; 160 m) normal, 7 chains (460 ft; 140 m) slow
- Length: 63 ft 0 1/4 in (19.21 m)
- Width: 8 ft 11 1/4 in (2.724 m)
- Height: 13 ft 0 in (3.962 m)
- Axle load: 18 long tons 8 cwt (41,200 lb or 18.7 t) (20.6 short tons)
- Adhesive weight: 55 long tons 2 cwt (123,400 lb or 56 t) (61.7 short tons)
- Loco weight: 74 long tons 0 cwt (165,800 lb or 75.2 t) (82.9 short tons) full
- Fuel type: Coal
- Fuel capacity: 7 long tons 0 cwt (15,700 lb or 7.1 t) (7.8 short tons)
- Water cap.: 3,500 imp gal (16,000 L; 4,200 US gal)
- Firebox
  - Grate area: 27.07 sq ft (2.515 m^{2})
- Boiler: GWR Standard No. 1
- Boiler pressure: 225 psi (1.55 MPa)
- Heating surface
  - Firebox: 154.78 sq ft (14.380 m^{2})
  - Tubes and flues: 1,686.60 sq ft (156.690 m^{2})
- Superheater
  - Heating area: 4-element: 191.8 sq ft (17.82 m^{2}), 6-element: 253.38 sq ft (23.540 m^{2})
- Cylinders: Two, outside
- Cylinder size: 18.5 in × 30 in (470 mm × 762 mm)
Performance figures
- Tractive effort: 28,875 lbf (128.44 kN)
Career
- Operators: Great Western Railway, British Railways
- Power class: GWR: D; BR: 5MT
- Numbers: 6800–6879
- Axle load class: GWR: Red
- First run: 1936
- Retired: 1960–1965
- Disposition: All original locomotives scrapped, GWR 6880 Betton Grange Operational

The Great Western Railway (GWR) 6800 Class or Grange Class is a mixed-traffic class of 4-6-0 steam locomotive, built to replace the GWR 4300 Class 2-6-0. There were 80 originally built in the class, all built at the Swindon works, using some reconditioned parts from withdrawn 4300 Class locomotives. The 81st Grange, 6880 Betton Grange, was completed in 2024 as new member of the class.

== Background ==
The GWR locomotive standardisation policy pursued by George Jackson Churchward envisaged a range of locomotive classes which would be suitable for the majority of duties, and yet which would share a small number of standard components. Among the designs suggested in 1901 was a 4-6-0 with 5-foot-8-inch (1.727 m) diameter driving wheels and the Standard No. 1 boiler. Although planned in 1901, none were built during Churchward's lifetime. C.B. Collett, (Churchward's successor at Swindon Works) rather introduced the Hall class with 6-foot (1.829 m) diameter driving wheels.

The 4300 Class of 2-6-0 tender locomotives had been introduced on the GWR for mixed traffic duties in 1911, and by 1932 there were 342 in service. However, by the mid-1930s some of the earlier examples were in need of attention and the class as a whole was struggling with some of the duties expected of them. Collett therefore revived the Churchward proposal, but modified the design to include a cab and controls to the current style. Between 1936 and 1939, one hundred 4300 Class were taken out of service and replaced by new 4-6-0 locomotives; eighty were of the 6800 (or Grange) class and the remaining 20 were of the 7800 (or Manor) class. It had been intended to replace all of the 4300 Class in this way, but the Second World War stopped the programme.

== Design and Production ==
The Granges were effectively a smaller-wheeled version of the Hall Class.

The wheels, valve motion and tenders were taken from the withdrawn engines, reconditioned and then used in the construction of the 100 new locomotives; the components from one old locomotive were spread amongst more than one of the new engines. The cylinders of the Granges were of the same size as those used on the 4300 Class, but the old cylinders could not be re-used because the cylinders and valves shared a common casting, and the new design called for the separation between cylinder and valve centre lines to be increased by 2 1/2 inches (64 mm). This was done in order to make the cylinders level with the axles, but still allow the use of the old valve motion parts.

The locomotives were built in two batches to a single order (Lot No. 308): Nos. 6800-6859 were built between August 1936 and December 1937, and Nos. 6860-6879 appeared between February and May 1939. They were all named after Granges in the area covered by the GWR. Further construction of the class was cancelled due to the outbreak of war. They were originally fitted with Churchward 3,500 imp gal (16,000 L; 4,200 US gal) tenders taken from withdrawn members of the 4300 Class. However, after the second world war several were fitted with newer 3,500 imp gal (16,000 L; 4,200 US gal) and 4,000 imp gal (18,000 L; 4,800 US gal) types.

== Performance ==
Although built to a thirty five-year-old design, in service they proved to be reliable performers. With their power and mixed traffic characteristics they could handle most duties on the network. Their smaller driving wheels giving them a higher tractive effort than the Hall Class. They were often used for the haulage of perishable goods, such as fruit and broccoli, and for excursion trains. However their axle loading prevented their use on some cross-country routes previously operated by the 4300 class. As a result, a lighter version in the form of the Manor Class was introduced for these duties.

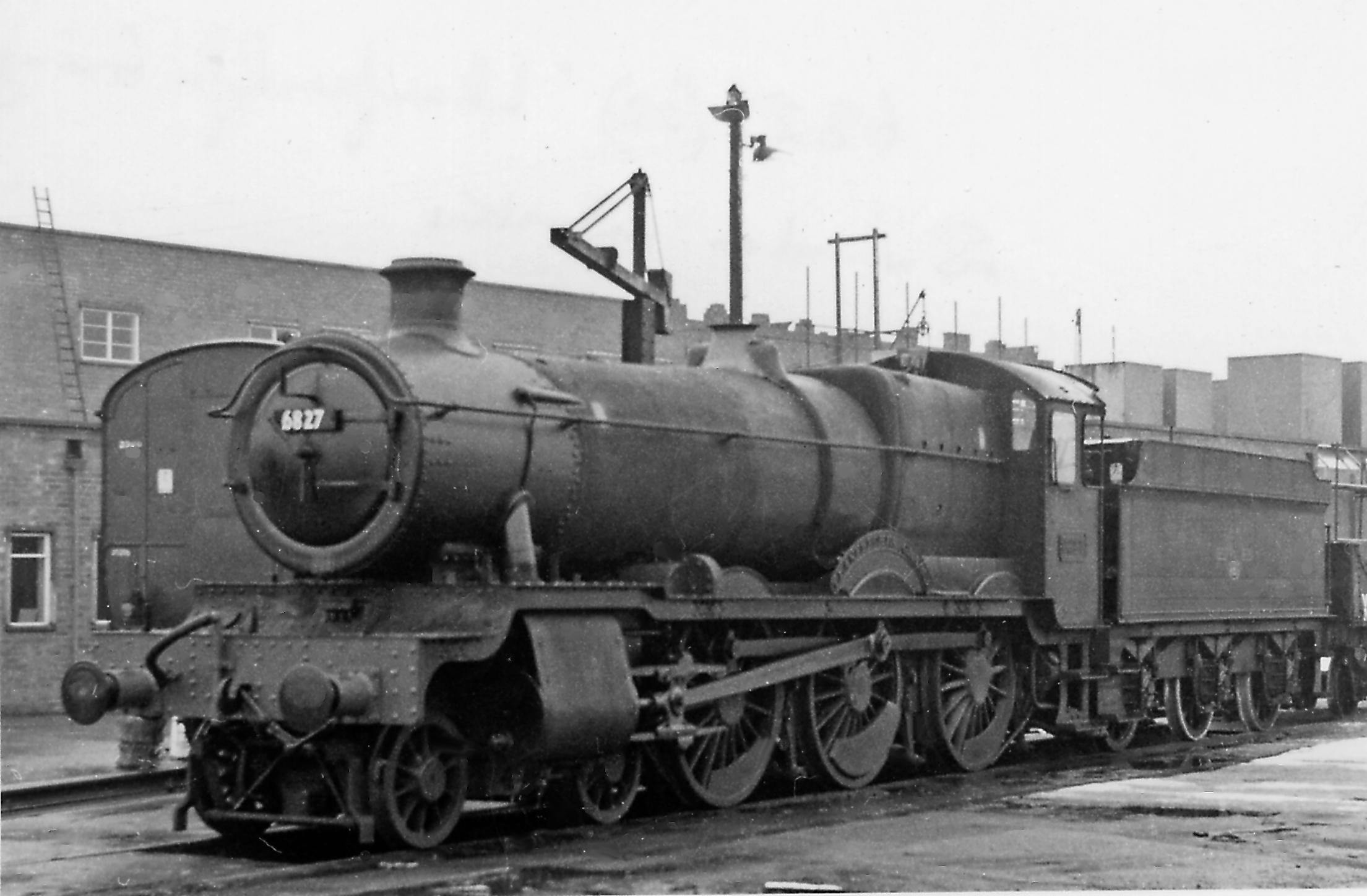
No. 6827 'Llanfrechfa Grange' at Swindon Works 29 November 1964.

The BR power classification of the Grange class was 5MT, its GWR power class was D and its route availability colour code was red.

== Accidents ==
- On 21 September 1962, 6800 Arlington Grange was hauling a freight train which overran signals at Steventon and was derailed.

== Withdrawal and Preservation ==
The entire class was withdrawn from service between 1960 and 1965 and no examples were preserved. However, GWR 6880 Betton Grange, the next Grange that was due to be built originally, was constructed between approximately 1998 and 2024 at the Llangollen Railway and Tyseley Locomotive Works.

Table of withdrawals
Year	Quantity in service at start of year	Number withdrawn	Quantity withdrawn	Locomotive numbers
1960	80	1	1	6801.
1961	79	2	3	6802/05.
1962	77	1	4	6865.
1963	76	5	9	6807/09/14/28/35.
1964	71	26	35	6800/04/06/08/10–11/18/21–22/24–25/32/34/39/42–46/50/52/63/67/73/75/78.
1965	45	45	80	6803/12–13/15–17/19–20/23/26–27/29–31/33/36–38/40–41/47–49/51/53–62/64/66/68–72/74/76–77/79.

== List of Locomotives ==
GWR/BR Number	Name	Built	Withdrawn	Notes
6800	Arlington Grange	August 1936	June 1964	
6801	Aylburton Grange	August 1936	October 1960	
6802	Bampton Grange	September 1936	August 1961	
6803	Bucklebury Grange	September 1936	September 1965	
6804	Brockington Grange	September 1936	August 1964	
6805	Broughton Grange	September 1936	March 1961	
6806	Blackwell Grange	September 1936	October 1964	
6807	Birchwood Grange	September 1936	December 1963	
6808	Beenham Grange	September 1936	August 1964	
6809	Burghclere Grange	September 1936	July 1963	
6810	Blakemere Grange	November 1936	October 1964	
6811	Cranbourne Grange	November 1936	July 1964	
6812	Chesford Grange	November 1936	February 1965	
6813	Eastbury Grange	December 1936	September 1965	
6814	Enborne Grange	December 1936	December 1963	
6815	Frilford Grange	December 1936	November 1965	
6816	Frankton Grange	December 1936	July 1965	Considered as a candidate for preservation when the GWS were first looking to preserve a 2-cylinder mixed traffic 4.6.0
6817	Gwenddwr Grange	December 1936	April 1965	
6818	Hardwick Grange	December 1936	April 1964	
6819	Highnam Grange	December 1936	November 1965	
6820	Kingstone Grange	January 1937	July 1965	
6821	Leaton Grange	January 1937	November 1964	
6822	Manton Grange	January 1937	September 1964	
6823	Oakley Grange	January 1937	June 1965	
6824	Ashley Grange	January 1937	April 1964	
6825	Llanvair Grange	February 1937	June 1964	
6826	Nannerth Grange	February 1937	May 1965	
6827	Llanfrechfa Grange	February 1937	September 1965	
6828	Trellech Grange	February 1937	July 1963	
6829	Burmington Grange	March 1937	November 1965	
6830	Buckenhill Grange	August 1937	October 1965	
6831	Bearley Grange	August 1937	October 1965	
6832	Brockton Grange	August 1937	January 1964	
6833	Calcot Grange	August 1937	October 1965	
6834	Dummer Grange	August 1937	June 1964	
6835	Eastham Grange	September 1937	May 1963	
6836	Estevarney Grange	September 1937	August 1965	
6837	Forthampton Grange	September 1937	July 1965	
6838	Goodmoor Grange	September 1937	November 1965	
6839	Hewell Grange	September 1937	May 1964	
6840	Hazeley Grange	September 1937	February 1965	
6841	Marlas Grange	September 1937	June 1965	
6842	Nunhold Grange	September 1937	November 1964	
6843	Poulton Grange	October 1937	February 1964	
6844	Penhydd Grange	October 1937	April 1964	
6845	Paviland Grange	October 1937	September 1964	
6846	Ruckley Grange	October 1937	September 1964	
6847	Tidmarsh Grange	October 1937	December 1965	
6848	Toddington Grange	October 1937	December 1965	
6849	Walton Grange	October 1937	December 1965	
6850	Cleeve Grange	October 1937	December 1964	
6851	Hurst Grange	November 1937	August 1965	
6852	Headbourne Grange	November 1937	January 1964	
6853	Morehampton Grange	November 1937	October 1965	
6854	Roundhill Grange	November 1937	September 1965	
6855	Saighton Grange	November 1937	October 1965	
6856	Stowe Grange	November 1937	November 1965	
6857	Tudor Grange	November 1937	October 1965	
6858	Woolston Grange	December 1937	October 1965	
6859	Yiewsley Grange	December 1937	November 1965	
6860	Aberporth Grange	February 1939	February 1965	
6861	Crynant Grange	February 1939	October 1965	
6862	Derwent Grange	February 1939	June 1965	
6863	Dolhywel Grange	February 1939	November 1964	
6864	Dymock Grange	February 1939	October 1965	
6865	Hopton Grange	March 1939	May 1962	
6866	Morfa Grange	March 1939	May 1965	
6867	Peterston Grange	March 1939	August 1964	
6868	Penrhos Grange	March 1939	October 1965	
6869	Resolven Grange	March 1939	July 1965	
6870	Bodicote Grange	March 1939	September 1965	
6871	Bourton Grange	March 1939	October 1965	
6872	Crawley Grange	March 1939	December 1965	
6873	Caradoc Grange	April 1939	June 1964	
6874	Haughton Grange	April 1939	September 1965	
6875	Hindford Grange	April 1939	March 1964	
6876	Kingsland Grange	April 1939	November 1965	
6877	Llanfair Grange	April 1939	March 1965	
6878	Longford Grange	May 1939	November 1964	
6879	Overton Grange	May 1939	October 1965	

== See also ==
- List of GWR standard classes with two outside cylinders
