= LNER Class V4 =

Class of 2 three-cylinder 2-6-2 locomotives

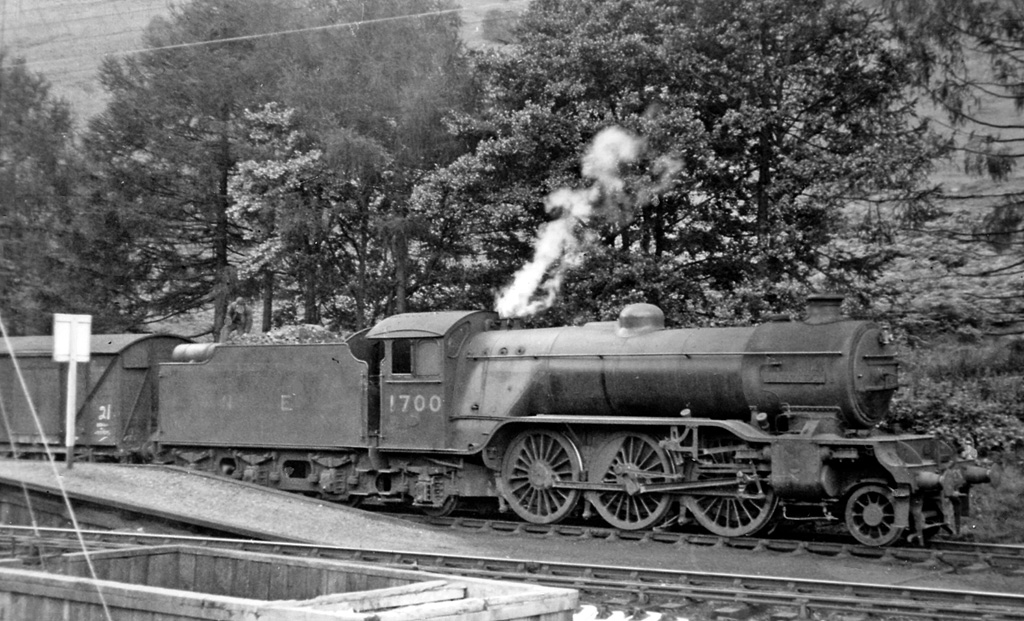
- V4 No. 1700 Bantam Cock in August 1948
Type and origin
- Power type: Steam
- Designer: Nigel Gresley
- Builder: Doncaster Works
- Order number: 355
- Serial number: 1919-1920
- Build date: 1941
- Total produced: 2
Specifications
- Configuration
  - Whyte: 2-6-2
  - UIC: 1′C1′ h3
- Leading dia.: 3 ft 2 in (0.97 m)
- Driver dia.: 5 ft 8 in (1.73 m)
- Trailing dia.: 3 ft 2 in (0.97 m)
- Wheelbase: 29 ft 4 in (8.94 m) engine 13 ft 0 in (3.96 m) tender 50 ft 2 1/4 in (15.297 m) total
- Axle load: 17 long tons (17 t)
- Loco weight: 70.4 long tons (71.5 t)
- Tender weight: 42.75 long tons (43.44 t)
- Total weight: 113.15 long tons (114.97 t)
- Firebox
  - Grate area: 28.5 sq ft (2.65 m^{2})
- Boiler: 5 ft 4 in (1.63 m) diameter
- Boiler pressure: 250 psi (1.7 MPa)
- Heating surface
  - Firebox: 151.6 sq ft (14.08 m^{2})
  - Tubes: 884.3 sq ft (82.15 m^{2})
  - Flues: 408.2 sq ft (37.92 m^{2})
  - Total surface: 1,799.9 sq ft (167.22 m^{2})
- Superheater
  - Heating area: 355.8 sq ft (33.05 m^{2})
- Cylinders: 3
- Cylinder size: 15 in × 26 in (380 mm × 660 mm)
- Valve gear: Outside: Walschaerts; Inside: Gresley conjugated
Performance figures
- Tractive effort: 27,420 lbf (122.0 kN)
Career
- Operators: London and North Eastern Railway, British Railways
- Power class: 6P5F
- Numbers: 3401–3402 (prior to 1946), 1700–1701 (1946–1948), 61700-61701 (1948 onwards)
- Locale: Scottish Region, Eastern Region
- Retired: 1957
- Disposition: Both scrapped, one new-build in planning

The London and North Eastern Railway Class V4 was a class of 2-6-2 steam locomotive designed by Sir Nigel Gresley for mixed-traffic use. It was Gresley's last design for the LNER before he died in 1941. The V4s had similarities in their appearance and mechanical layout to the V2 "Green Arrow" class. The V2s, introduced some years before, were large and heavy locomotives, with very limited route availability. The V4 was a lightweight alternative, suitable for use over the whole of the LNER network.

== Features ==
Two locomotives were built at the LNER's Doncaster Works in 1941. The first engine, 3401 Bantam Cock, had a scaled-down version of the Gresley Pacific boiler with a grate area of 28.5 sq ft. Its tractive effort of 27,000 lbs was produced by boiler pressure of 250 psi and three cylinders of 15-inch diameter. The second locomotive, 3402, incorporated a fully welded steel firebox and a single thermic syphon for water circulation. It was not named, but was known unofficially as "Bantam Hen".

== Performance ==
The V4 type locomotive had more power and better riding qualities than the existing B17s. Due to the success of early tests, the locomotive was anticipated to become a central feature of the railway, with projections greatly exceeding the eventual manufacturing outputs. The main factor of this decline was the death of Sir Nigel Gresley, locomotive designer and Chief Mechanical Engineer of LNER, who died shortly after the construction of locomotive no. 3402. Rather than continuing Gresley's model, successor Edward Thompson, had a different vision for the future rolling stock of LNER; Instead adopting the simpler LNER Thompson Class B1 as the railway's standard mixed-traffic locomotive.

== Service in Scotland ==
The two locomotives were sent to Scotland for use on the West Highland Line, although their wheel arrangement was not particularly suitable for the steep gradients on the line. They were renumbered 1700 and 1701 in 1946, and later became British Railways 61700 and 61701.

== Withdrawal ==
Both were scrapped in 1957 when their boilers became due for renewal.

== New Build V4 ==
At the A1 Steam Locomotive Trust Silver Jubilee Convention, it was announced that after the completion of no. 2007 "Prince of Wales", they would begin construction on a new V4 which will be number 3403 (61702). On the 6th of September, 2018, the A1 Trust officially announced that it had started the pre-launch stage for project, with a projected cost of £3 million, and an estimated starting date of 2021. The project is estimated to take around 5 years. There are already parts for the V4 at Darlington Locomotive Works, including a complete set of tyres (originally made for a group in the 1990s who planned to build a V4), a chimney, and the speedometer drives from a British Rail Class 08. In October of 2022, the A1 Steam Locomotive Trust announced that No. 3403 will be named Highlander.
