= LNER locomotive numbering and classification =

British locomotive classification system

A number of different numbering and classification schemes were used for the locomotives owned by the London and North Eastern Railway (LNER) and its constituent companies. This page explains the principal systems that were used. The following abbreviations for the constituent companies are used on this page:

- Principal Constituents

Great Central Railway (GCR), Great Eastern Railway (GER), Great Northern Railway (GNR), Great North of Scotland Railway (GNoSR), Hull and Barnsley Railway (HBR), North British Railway (NBR), and North Eastern Railway (NER)

- Minor Companies (absorbed between July 1923 and July 1924)

Colne Valley and Halstead Railway (CV&HR), East and West Yorkshire Union Railways (E&WYUR), and Mid-Suffolk Light Railway (MSLR)

- Later Additions

Midland and Great Northern Joint Railway (M&GNJR) - absorbed October 1936

Ex-Metropolitan Railway steam locomotives (via the London Passenger Transport Board) - absorbed November 1937

- For information about individual classes and locomotives, see: Locomotives of the London and North Eastern Railway

== Numbering ==
=== Constituent Companies ===
The constituent companies of the LNER operated no specific numbering system. Locomotives were numbered in a range starting from 1, with new locomotives being given numbers according to one of three different ways:

- New numbers at the end of the existing series;
- 'Significant numbers' (e.g. the first of the GER's new passenger locomotive class built from 1900 was numbered '1900', leaving many preceding numbers unused); or
- Filling in blanks left by the withdrawal of older locomotives, or their transfer to the 'duplicate list' (see below).

In the latter case, on the GER at least, some attempt was made to keep locomotives of the same class numbered in sequence. The GCR and GNoSR operated a strict policy of not permitting any gaps in the number series, nominally for accounting purposes, but this was not followed on other lines.

In 1922, the first step towards the 'Grouping' was taken, when the HBR was absorbed by the NER. At that time 3000 was added to the numbers of surviving HBR locomotives which left them well clear of the highest NER numbers then allocated (about 2350).

In almost all cases, the constituent companies used only steam locomotives. The NER had 13 electric lomotives, numbered 1-13, but this was in fact in the company's main locomotive list as the lowest-numbered steam locomotive was numbered 14. The NBR owned a petrol shunter, and this was numbered '1' in its own series.

==== Duplicate Lists ====
'Duplicate lists' were operated by most of the constituent companies in which older locomotives, whose capital costs had been written off but which were not yet ready for withdrawal, could be renumbered, releasing space in the main number range for new locomotives. A variety of different approaches to creating a duplicate list were employed:

- GCR: 'B' suffix added
- GER: '0' prefix added
- GNR: 'A' suffix added
- GNoSR: 'A' suffix added
- NBR: 1000 added to original number
- NER: Use of duplicate list abandoned before Grouping

=== Post-Grouping Numbering ===
When the LNER was created in 1923, it immediately set about finding a solution to the problem that many of its inherited locomotives carried the same numbers. The first solution, applied from September 1923 was to add a letter suffix to numbers that indicated the original owning company. The first column of the table below shows the letters applied in bold followed by an explanation of the letter in lighter type.

This solution was quickly abandoned as it meant that ex-NBR locomotives were carrying numbers that duplicated ex-GCR locomotives carried in their duplicate list. Indeed, this system would not have coped well with any of the locomotives in the constituent company's duplicate lists. Therefore, a new system was derived and applied from February 1924. This involved adding a multiple of thousands to each locomotive number, except:

- Ex-NER locomotives which retained their original number;
- Ex-HBR and ex-GCR duplicate list locomotives which were completely renumbered.

Other duplicate list locomotives were renumbered in the same manner as those in the capital list; i.e. with the prescribed multiple of thousands added, but retaining their prefix or suffix as appropriate. Departmental (non-revenue earning) locomotives continued to be numbered in their own, locally-applied, series.

The table below sets out the number ranges used for this system:

1923 Suffix	1924 Numbering	Origins
**D**arlington	1-2404	Ex-North Eastern Railway (numbers unchanged)
**D**arlington	2405–2542	Ex-Hull & Barnsley Railway (renumbered in same order as when renumbered 3013-3161 by the NER)
**N**orthern	3001-4770	Ex-Great Northern Railway (3000 added to original number)
**C**entral	5001-6494	Ex-Great Central Railway (5000 added to original number, except Duplicate List locomotives renumbered to 6402-6494 in order of age, youngest first)
**S**cotland	6801-6915	Ex-Great North of Scotland Railway (6800 added to original number)
**E**astern	7001-8900	Ex-Great Eastern Railway (7000 added to original number)
**B**ritish	9001-10481	Ex-North British Railway (9000 added to original number)

Note: At first, it was planned to renumber the ex-NBR duplicate list locomotives into blank numbers in the main ex-NBR series. This would have left the highest number allocated as 10050, but after only a handful of locomotives had been so treated, the scheme was abandoned and all duplicate list locomotives were renumbered with 9000 added to their original numbers.

==== Minor Companies ====
The LNER also absorbed locomotives from a number of smaller railway companies. Their locomotive stock were renumbered as follows:

- Ex-CV&HR and MSLR: Being located in the ex-GER area, these locomotives took numbers 8312-8317, which were blank numbers in the GER series.
- Ex-E&WYUR: Being located in the ex-GNR area, these locomotives took numbers 3112-3115, which were blank numbers in the GNR series
- Ex-M&GNJR: These locomotives had a '0' added as a prefix to their numbers.
- Ex-Metropolitan Railway: Being located in the ex-GCR operating area, these locomotives took numbers 6154-6163 and 6415-6422 in the GCR series.

==== New Locomotives ====
Immediately after Grouping, new engines were numbered in the series used by their constituent company that had ordered them; including the onward transfer of older locomotives to the appropriate duplicate list. Subsequently the new numbering systems of 1923 and 1924 were used in the same way.

Thereafter, new locomotives built to LNER designs were mostly numbered in blocks of unused numbers, keeping engines of the same class together. In general, the lowest available block of numbers were used (i.e. starting with the 2xxx numbers after the ex-HBR stock and moving upwards), but there were some exceptions:

- Some engines built for work in a specific area took numbers in the range used for engines of the appropriate constituent company.
- Some engines were given 'significant numbers' for publicity purposes, e.g. the experimental water tube boiler locomotive was allocated 10000, and the 'P2' class started at 2001.

There is evidence that there were cases where new engines were initially allocated numbers in one series according to one of the principles set out above, but these were changed before the engines were released into service in line with an alternative principle. For example, 'P2' class 2001 was originally allocated '2981' until it was decided to give it a 'significant number' instead.

=== 1942 Renumbering ===
In October 1942, a limited renumbering of locomotives was undertaken to clear numbers in the 8300-8900 series for reuse by new locomotives. The following locomotives were affected:

Class	1924 Numbers	1942 Numbers
E4	7407-7506 (18 survivors only)	7791-7808
F7	8301-8310 (6 survivors only)	7593-7598
Y1 & Y10	8400-8404	7772-7776
Y11	8430-8431	7591-7592
B12	8500-8580 (80 survivors only)	7415-7494
D15 & D16	8780-8900	7650-7770

However, this scheme was abandoned in early 1943, after only 38 locomotives had been renumbered. The reason was that new plans had been drawn up to carry out a wholesale renumbering of engines, as set out below. The engines that had been renumbered mostly continued to carry their 1942 numbers until the 1946 renumbering was implemented, though two reverted to their 1923 numbers to make way for new locomotive construction.

==== 1944 Interim Renumbering ====
In the interim period between the new numbering system being devised (See below) and it being applied to engines from 1946, a number of temporary renumberings were undertaken to keep things in order. These included:

- 3157-3167 (10 survivors only) renumbered 3180-3189 to make way for new freight engines.
- 4075 renumbered to the 'significant number' of 2000 following its refurbishment for dedicated use hauling officers' saloons (resulting in old 2000 becoming 2050). This engine was briefly numbered 1 after refurbishment, during which time old 1 became 4075 before reverting to 1.
- 8000-8011 renumbered 7978-7989 to make way for new diesel shunters.

=== 1946 Renumbering ===
The downside of the numbering system used by the LNER - and which had not been tackled by the 1942 renumbering - was that locomotives were carrying scattered numbers without reference to class, let alone type of locomotive. In 1943, a scheme was drawn up that would see a complete renumbering of the LNER stock, so that locomotives of the same class would be numbered together and placed in a series with classes of the same type. The renumbering scheme was based on the locomotives that were in stock as of 4 July 1943 but was not issued until December that year. Only three locomotives would retain their previous numbers: one (Class W1 no. 10000) by design, the other two (Class J3 nos. 4125/6) by coincidence. Due to the pressures of World War II, the scheme was not actually implemented until 1946, but the basic principles remained the same, as set out in the table below:

Number Series	Locomotive Type	Principal Wheel Arrangements
1-999	Express passenger tender locomotives	4-6-2, 2-8-2 and large 2-6-2
1000-1999	Six-coupled passenger and mixed traffic tender locomotives	4-6-0, 2-6-0 and small 2-6-2
2000-2999	Four-coupled passenger tender locomotives	4-4-0, 4-4-2 and 2-4-0
3000-3999	Eight-coupled freight tender locomotives	0-8-0, 2-8-0 and 2-8-2
4000-5999	Six-coupled freight tender locomotives	0-6-0
6000-6999	Electric locomotives	Various types
7000-7999	Passenger tank locomotives	2-4-2, 0-4-4, 4-4-2, 4-4-4 and 2-6-2
8000-8999	Shunting tank locomotives (steam and diesel)	0-4-0, 0-4-2 and 0-6-0
9000-9999	Mixed traffic and freight tank locomotives	0-6-2, 4-6-2 and other miscellaneous types
10000	Experimental Class W1 locomotive (retained 1924 number)	4-6-4

In each class, individual engines were numbered in order of construction (with a small number of exceptions, most notably the 'A4' class where locomotives carrying the names of the LNER's directors were given 'significant numbers' 1-4).

Self-evidently the renumbering process was very complicated as the LNER was keen not to have two locomotives running in service with the same number. This meant renumbering engines whose new numbers were already vacant first and then following through the chain of renumberings.

There was a further complication in that part-way through the renumbering, there was a change of plan in terms of the numbers allocated in the 1-999 series (for reasons that are mostly unclear), the 1xxx series (to allow more space for new 'B1' class engines), and the 3xxx series (to allow more space for engines purchased from the War Department). This meant some of these engines were renumbered twice (106 in total - 59 of which were 'O1' or 'O4' engines). The changes were as follows:

Class	Original Allocation	Revised Allocation
A1	500	113
A3	501-578	35-112 (in order of original number, not age)
A4	580-613 (already changed so that 596/608/609/611 would be 1-4)	1-4 (unchanged), 5-8 (prestigious people names), 9-13 (dominion names) and 14-34 ("Silver" and birds) - each group in order of their original numbers (not in order of age)
V2	700-883	800-983
A2	990-995	501-506 (plus new engines from 507 onwards)
B5	1300–1312	1678–1690
B15	1313-1327 (8 survivors only)	1691–1698
B6	1328–1330	1346–1348
B8	1331–1341	1349–1359
B9	1342–1351	1469–1478
B18	1470–1471	1479–1480
B19	1472-1477 (4 survivors only)	1490–1493
B3	1480–1485	1494–1499
B4	1490–1499	1481–1489
O6	3100-3167	3500-3567
O1 & O4	3500-3569	Blanks between 3572-3809 (left vacant for engines loaned to the War Department but not returned)

In addition, there were a number of other minor changes from the original plan where engines had since been withdrawn, but in these cases the numbers allocated under the new plan were carried from the start and no additional renumbering was required.

==== Application by British Railways ====
New engines built by British Railways to ex-LNER designs after Nationalisation in 1948 continued to use this numbering system, albeit with 60000 added to the numbers to avoid number conflicts with other absorbed engines (see BR locomotive and multiple unit numbering and classification). There were some minor amendments made by BR, however:

- Former LNER diesel and petrol shunters were numbered in the 15xxx series (though the petrol shunters initially carried their appropriate 68xxx series numbers until 1949), while the electric locomotives were numbered in the 26xxx series, leaving the 66xxx series unused.
- LNER 10000 became 60700 as the 70xxx series was designated for standard BR steam designs
- Ex-War Department freight locomotives, initially allocated their appropriate 6xxxx series numbers, were renumbered into the 90xxx series along with other engines of this type purchased by BR.
- 'L1' class engines, initially numbered from 9000 upwards by the LNER and 69000 upwards by BR, were quickly renumbered to 67701 upwards, where there was more space for new engine numbers. The 69000 series was then reused for new-build 'J72' locomotives.

In addition, older engines continued to be renumbered within the rules of the LNER numbering system to make way for new engines, particular production of the 'B1' and 'K1' classes.

== Classification ==
=== Constituent Companies ===
==== Great Central Railway ====
From 1859, the GCR identified different classes using an alphanumeric system. The first list of classes was a simple list of numbers from 1 onward. Number 18 was the highest allocated. Thence, newly built classes received class numbers with a letter suffix rather than using more numbers. By 1923, the '9' series (the largest) had reached '9Q'. Of themselves the letters and numbers had no meaning; they appear to have been allocated randomly.

Where new classes were built, or existing classes rebuilt, these were often indicated by adding a more meaningful suffix to the existing alphanumeric class were used. Examples included:

- ALT: Altered
- B: Bogie version
- CONV: Converted
- I: Improved version
- M: Motor train equipment fitted
- T: Tank engine version

Locomotives inherited from the Lancashire, Derbyshire and East Coast Railway retained their existing classifications (lettered A to D) and the locomotive inherited from the Wrexham, Mold and Connah's Quay Railway was left unclassified.

==== Great Eastern Railway ====
The principal GER works at Stratford used an order number series that ran from A to Z, then A1 to Z1, A2 to Z2 and so on. This system was used for a myriad of items, including locomotives, but it was these numbers that were used to refer to locomotive classes. Self-evidently this meant there was no continuity in the GER locomotive classification system. The highest-numbered locomotive class was 'H88'.

Where more than one order number had been used for a given class, the first order number allocated was used to refer to the whole class. Where locomotives were purchased from outside manufacturers, they were referred to by the lowest number applied to a class member.

==== Great Northern Railway ====
From 1900, the GNR adopted a system of classification based on a locomotive's wheel arrangemenent (using the Whyte Notation), with each arrangement being represented by a letter. Initially, the letters A to J were allocated in ascending order of driving axles and descending order of leading axles. Letters K to O were allocated later as new types were introduced and A was re-used once all the 4-2-2 locomotives had been withdrawn. The full list of letters used was as follows:

- A: 4-2-2, later 4-6-2
- B: 2-2-2
- C: 4-4-2
- D: 4-4-0
- E: 2-4-0
- F: 0-4-2
- G: 0-4-4
- H: 2-6-0
- I: Unused
- J: 0-6-0
- K: 0-8-0
- L: 0-8-2
- M: 0-4-0 Railmotor
- N: 0-6-2
- O: 2-8-0

After the letter was a number that identified broadly similar types, although there could be some significant variation within a single class number. In the main, numbers were allocated in descending order of driving wheel diameter.

==== Great North of Scotland Railway ====
In 1879, every class then in service was allocated a letter between 'A' and 'M' (except 'I'), the oldest types first. From then on, new classes either reused letters that had become free due to withdrawal of older engines, or were allocated a letter at the end of the series. Class 'U' was not used and the highest letter allocated was 'Y'.

==== Hull and Barnsley Railway ====
Classes were allocated a letter consecutively from 'A', with similar classes being allocated a numeric suffix, or an 'S' suffix to indicate Superheated. The last class letter allocated was 'L'. When the HBR was absorbed by the NER from April 1922, the suffix '(HB)' was added to all ex-HBR classes to differentiate them from NER classes.

==== North British Railway ====
In 1913, every locomotive then in service was allocated a letter indicating its power. Letters 'A' to 'G' were used for goods engines and shunters and 'H' to 'R' for passenger engines, most powerful types first. Letters 'O' and 'Q' were not used. This system did mean that each letter covered a variety of different classes of locomotive.

==== North Eastern Railway ====
Prior to 1886, classes were referred to by the number applied to the first built locomotive within that class. New classes built after 1886 were allocated a letter to describe them, commencing at A. Where new classes were a modification of an earlier class allocated a letter, then they were allocated that letter with a numeric suffix starting at 1. The series reached Z in 1911. The next new class was allocated 'D', which had become vacant following rebuilding of the original class to take that letter.

There were some exceptions to this system:

- Class BTP: A series of Bogie Tank Passenger locomotives built in 1874.
- Class 3CC and 4CC: A series of 3- and 4-Cylinder Compound locomotives.
- Class 4-6-2: The five 4-6-2 locomotives built in 1922.

==== Minor Companies ====
The three minor companies absorbed by the LNER in 1923 and 1924 were too small to need to classify their locomotive stock. However, both the M&GNJR and Metropolitan Railway had owned a much larger stock of locomotives. Both railways allocated each class a letter consecutively from 'A'. The highest letter issued by the M&GNJR was 'D', and by the Metropolitan was 'K'.

=== LNER System ===
==== Steam Locomotives ====
When the LNER was created in 1923, a new classification scheme was drawn up that could accommodate all the inherited steam locomotives and future new classes, and provide useful information about the features of a given class. The answer, approved in September 1923, was a variation of the GNR system, using a letter to indicate each type's wheel arrangement (based on the Whyte Notation).

The letters were allocated with passenger engine arrangements first in descending order of coupled wheels ('A' to 'H'), then goods engine arrangements in ascending order of coupled wheels ('J' to 'T'). Letters 'X', 'Y', 'Z' were used for a variety of small engine arrangements. The letter 'P' was included in the original list, even though there were no locomotives of the 2-8-2 wheel arrangement until June 1925, because Class P1 was at an advanced stage of design – the order was placed in November 1923. Letters 'I' and 'U', 'V', 'W' were left unused at the time, but the latter three were later applied when new wheel arrangements were introduced; 'I' was never used. The full list of letters used was as follows:

- A: 4-6-2
- B: 4-6-0
- C: 4-4-2
- D: 4-4-0
- E: 2-4-0
- F: 2-4-2
- G: 0-4-4
- H: 4-4-4
- J: 0-6-0
- K: 2-6-0
- L: 2-6-4
- M: 0-6-4
- N: 0-6-2
- O: 2-8-0
- P: 2-8-2
- Q: 0-8-0
- R: 0-8-2
- S: 0-8-4
- T: 4-8-0
- U: 2-8-0+0-8-2
- V: 2-6-2
- W: 4-6-4
- X: 4-2-2 & 2-2-4
- Y: 0-4-0
- Z: 0-4-2

Many of these letters (A, C, D, E, G, J, N, O) were the same as in the GNR scheme. The letter 'Z' was initially intended for all miscellaneous classes, including departmental (non-revenue earning types), no matter what their wheel arrangement. However, this application was abandoned in 1927 and the letter was used solely for 0-4-2 types from then onwards.

After the letter was a number, which was unique to a particular class of locomotive. In 1923, these numbers were allocated (with a small number of exceptions) in the following order:

- Tender engines first, then tank engines (except letters 'X' and 'Y')
- Ex-GNR classes first, then ex-GCR, GER, NER (including HBR), NBR and GNoSR classes
- In order of driving wheel diameter, largest first
- In order of age, oldest first

In order to indicate variations within a class, subclass numbers were issued, taking the form of a suffix to the main class number, e.g. 'D17/1'.

New build and converted locomotives to LNER designs were allocated class numbers in appropriate gaps in the series. On occasions, this led to the re-use of class numbers left vacant following withdrawal or rebuilding of its members. This occurred only infrequently up to 1941, but became more common thereafter. Indeed, on occasions, older classes in the course of withdrawal were reclassified so that new types could have lower numbers; e.g. the old 'B1' class became 'B18' to make room for the new standard LNER 4-6-0 type.

During 1942, three new types were allocated the appropriate letter classification ('A', 'B' and 'D') but without any suffix number; these were prototypes for what were planned to be the new standard LNER classes. However, this approach was not maintained, and the production types were allocated standard class numbers.

A number of classes inherited by the LNER were not formally allocated a place in the new system. Most of these were one-off or departmental engines, or types slated for early withdrawal, although some of the latter survived in stock through to 1928. However, there were some curious gaps in the formal list of class numbers allocated in 1923, and it may be that some of these unused numbers were nominally intended for these classes. Other gaps in the list were clearly left to allow space for the construction of new classes, and many of these gaps were filled in due course.

Engines absorbed from the smaller companies during 1923-1924 (the CV&HR, E&WYUR and MSLR) were either withdrawn before a classification could be allocated or were fitted into appropriate gaps in the class list. For the ex-M&GNJR engines (absorbed 1936), their original single letter classification was maintained through to 1942 when they were, at last, allocated class numbers at the end of the appropriate series. The only exceptions were engines that were identical to ex-GNR designs, which adopted the latter's classification. In contrast, the ex-Metropolitan Railway engines (absorbed 1937) were allocated LNER classifications immediately.

The Great Southern Railways of Ireland would later adopt a similar classification system.

==== Modern Traction ====
Diesel and electric locomotives were given three-part classifications, commencing with either 'DE' for Diesel (electric transmission), 'DM' for Diesel (mechanical transmission) or 'E' for Electric, then 'B' for Banking, 'E' for Express, 'M' for Mixed Traffic or 'S' for Shunter, and finally a number issued to different types consecutively from 1.

Note: The LNER's petrol shunters were initially unclassified. When they were allocated a class number in the 1940s, it was 'Y11' in the steam locomotive class series. Similarly, the diesel electric shunters were initially allocated 'J45', being reclassified 'DES1' from September 1945.
