= LNER Class A1 =

Class A1 in the London and North Eastern Railway's classification system may refer to any of the following British steam locomotives :

- The GNR Class A1 or "Gresley A1", a class of 52 Pacific locomotives designed by Sir Nigel Gresley, including Flying Scotsman
- The LNER Thompson Class A1/1, a single Pacific locomotive designed by Edward Thompson and rebuilt from a Gresley A1
- The LNER Peppercorn Class A1, a class of 49 Pacific locomotives designed by A. H. Peppercorn
- LNER Peppercorn Class A1 60163 Tornado, a new locomotive completed in 2008, officially considered to be the 50th member of its class.

== See also ==
- LNER Pacifics
