= LNER Pacifics =

The London and North Eastern Railway (LNER) operated various classes steam locomotives with a 4-6-2 (or Pacific) wheel arrangement. They had more Pacifics than any other of the Big Four British railway companies and were mostly used for express passenger work along the East Coast Main Line, though later many were displaced to other lines.

== Overview ==
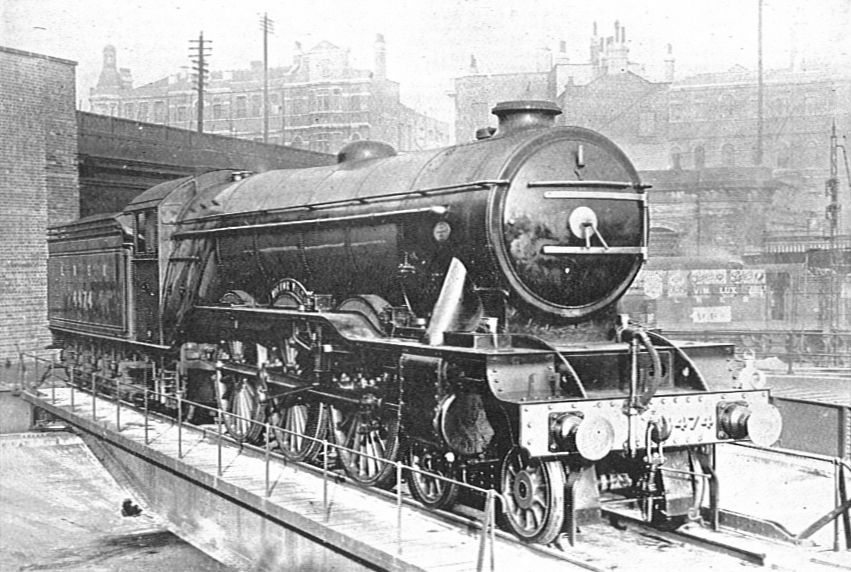
A1

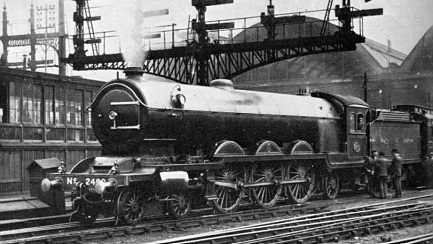
A2

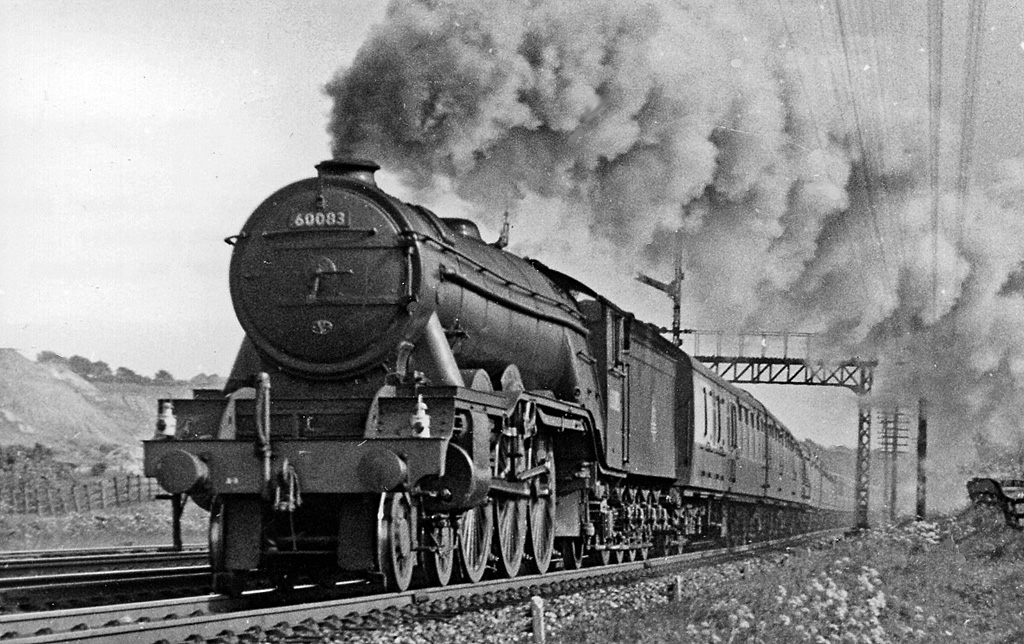
A3

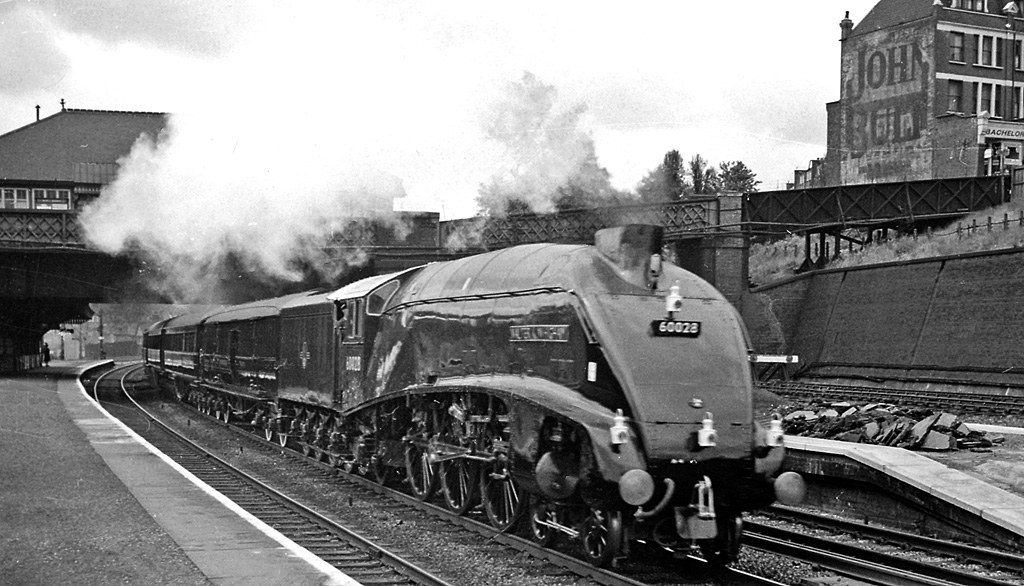
A4

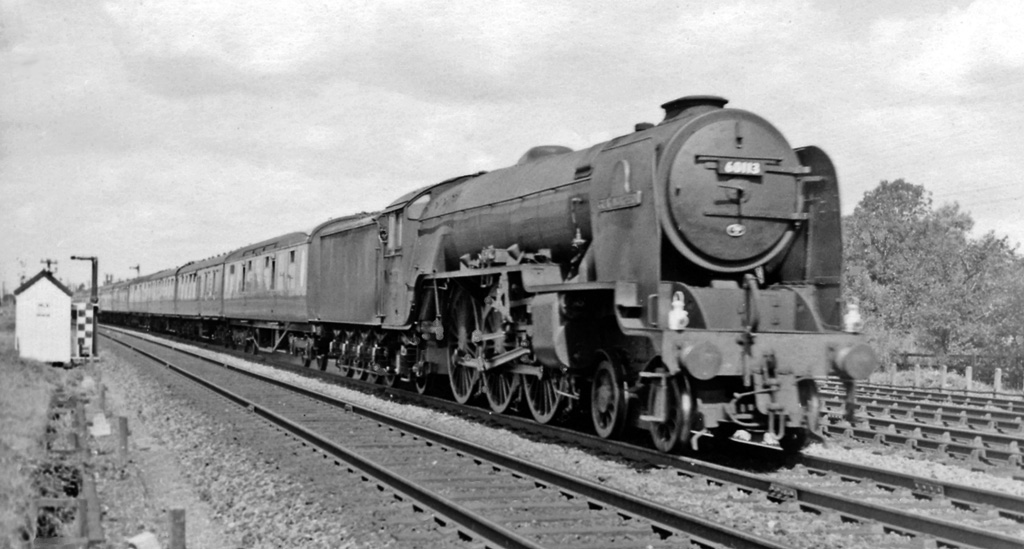
A1/1

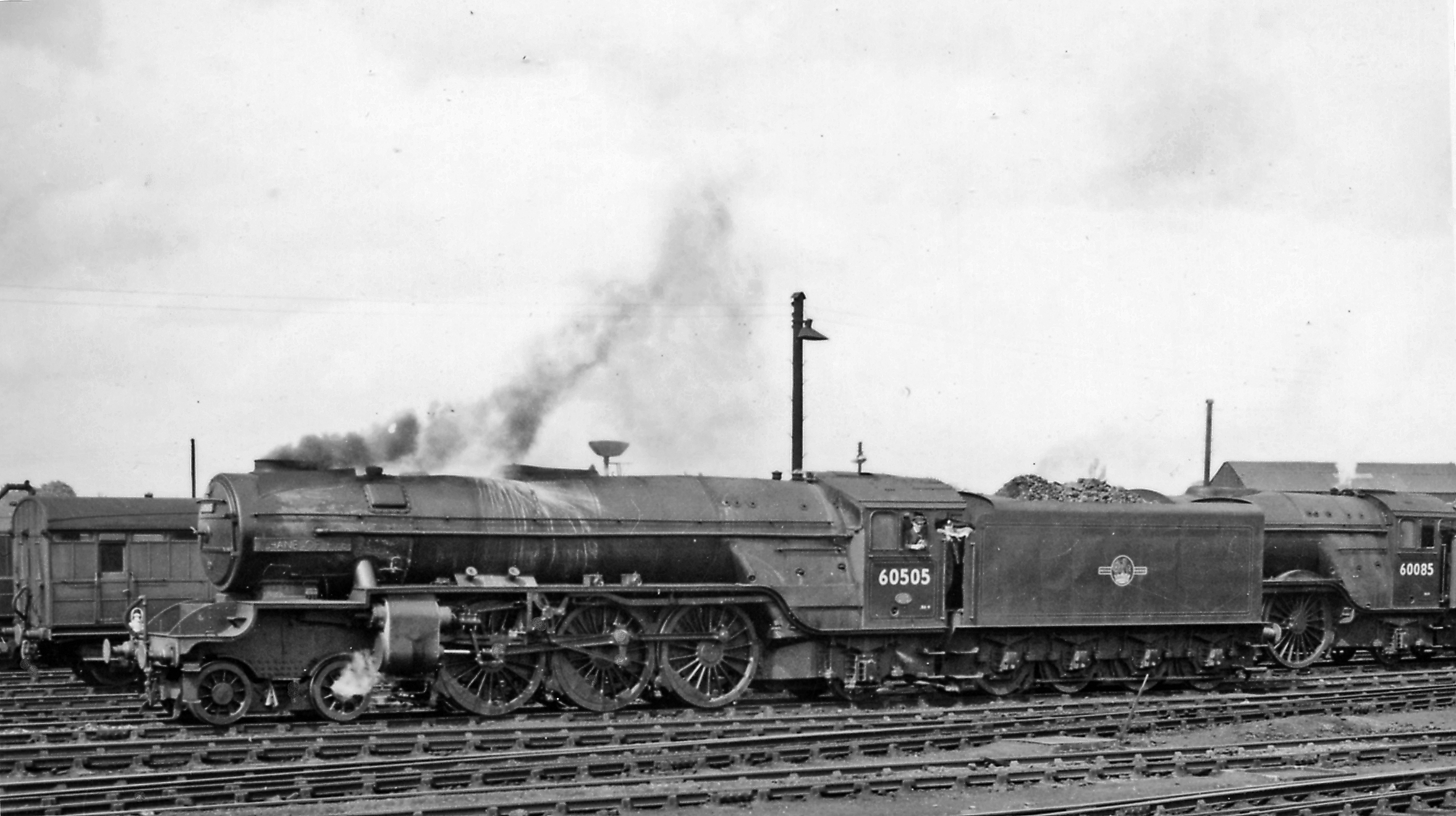
A2/2

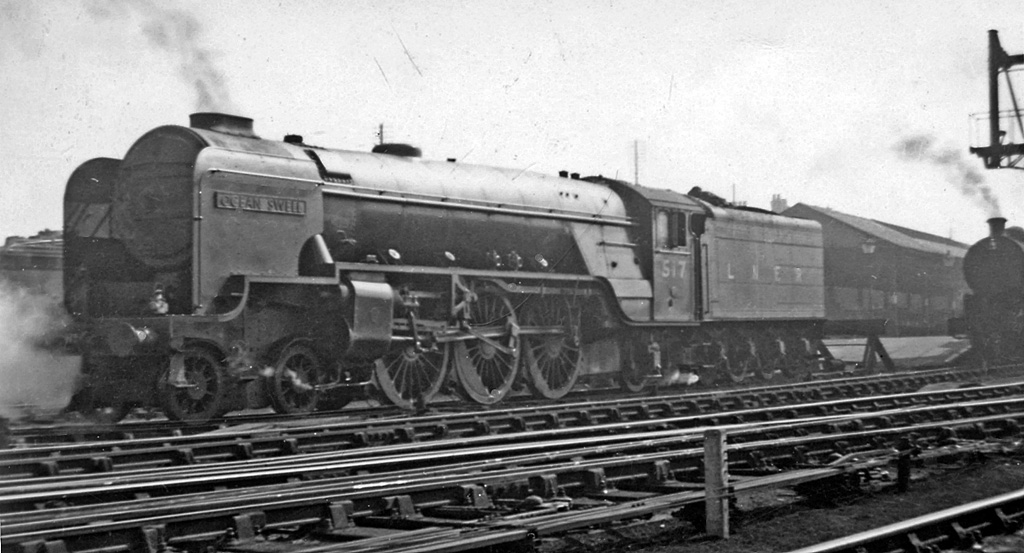
A2/3

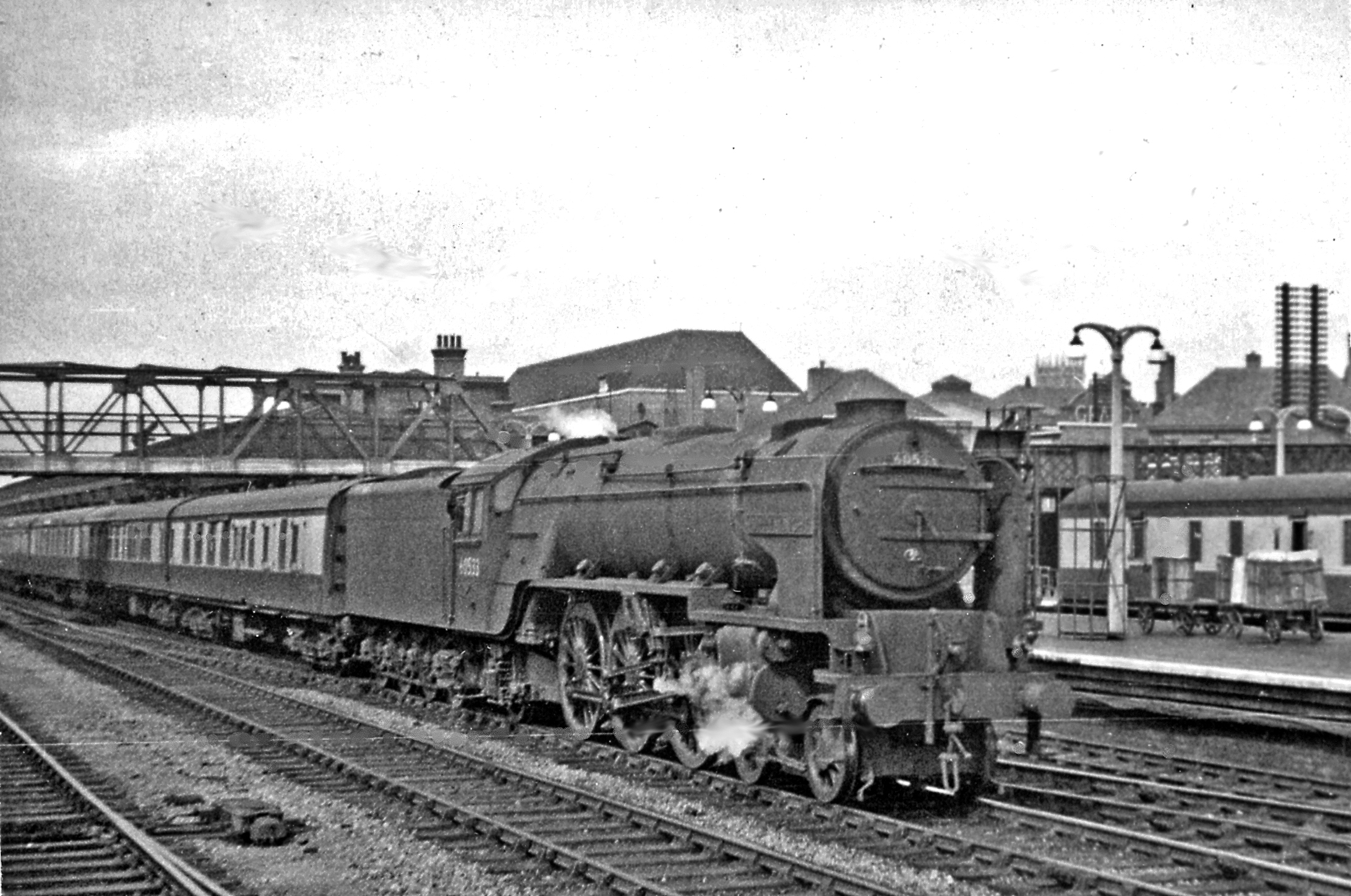
Peppercorn A2

In 1923, the LNER inherited four pacifics, to two classes each consisting of two locomotives, one class from either of two of its constituents, the Great Northern Railway (GNR) and the North Eastern Railway (NER). The Great Northern Pacifics, were of GNR Class A1, designed by Nigel Gresley and numbered 1470/1. The NER had completed two Pacifics, Nos 2400/1, designed by Vincent Raven. The LNER adopted the GNR classification system by wheel arrangement, with the A-prefix indicating the most prestigious wheel arrangement. The GNR Class A1s remained Class A1 and the NER Pacifics were reclassified A2.

The LNER also used Pacific tank engines, initially classified A5-7 and were eventually joined by a class A8. However because of their different lineage and operational use, they are not further considered here.

The LNER completed an additional three A2s in 1924. In 1929 2404 City of Ripon was fitted with a modified A1 boiler, but otherwise the A2s bore little resemblance to the remaining LNER Pacifics which were the continued evolution of the same basic Gresley design. The Raven Class A2s were all withdrawn in 1936/7, freeing the A2 designation for later reuse.

Comparisons between the A1 and A2s showed the former to be superior, thus they were selected for more building. A total of 52 A1s were eventually built. From 1928, the A1s started being fitted with higher-pressure superheated boilers. This reboilering turned them into Class A3, and eventually all but one A1 would be rebuilt to A3s up to 1948. In addition, 27 new A3s (Nos 2743-2752, 2595-2599, 2500-2508, 2795-2797) were built.

In 1929 a single experimental Class W1 water-tube boiler locomotive was constructed. The W1 was rebuilt in 1936 with a more conventional fire-tube boiler, retaining its W1 classification. Although not technically a Pacific but a 4-6-4 "Baltic", there were many engineering similarities and operationally it shared similar duties.

The next class to be introduced was the Class A4 in 1935. A total of 35 were built with large streamlined casing. One of these A4s, 4469 Sir Ralph Wedgwood was destroyed during the Baedeker raids of World War II.

Post-war, the initially straightforward classification system for LNER Pacifics started to break down. In 1945, Edward Thompson rebuilt the first A1 Great Northern. This was initially kept classified A1 and the few remaining A1s were reclassified A10. The intention was always to rebuild the remaining A10s into A1s, however this was not done as the rebuild was unsuccessful and they were instead rebuilt to A3s, the Class A10 becoming extinct in 1948. Instead, a brand new class of 49 Peppercorn Class A1s were introduced in 1948, and in anticipation of these Great Northern was reclassified as Class A1/1 in 1947.

In 1943 and 1944 Thompson also rebuilt the Class P2s into Class A2/2s. In 1944, Thompson built another subclass when another subclass of A2s originally ordered as V2s, these being the LNER Thompson Class A2/1. Another fifteen new engines were built to a third design and classified A2/3.

Under the LNER's 1946 renumbering scheme, the Class A4s were given the lowest (i.e. most prestigious) numbers 1-34. The A3s and few remaining A10s were renumbered 35-112 and the Thompson A1/1 Great Northern became No. 113. The Thompson A2s were given 1946 numbers from rebuilding. The A2/1 becoming 507-10, A2/2 501-6, and the A2/3 becoming 500/11-24. A single Peppercorn Class A2, No. 525, was completed before nationalisation in 1948, but a further 6 were given LNER numbers (Nos 526-31) before BR decided on a numbering system. BR then added 60000 to all LNER Pacific numbers, though it took a while to apply these. The remaining Peppercorn Class A2s received their BR numbers 60532-9 from new, as did the LNER Peppercorn Class A1s which were numbered 60114-62.

== Withdrawal ==
Excluding the Raven Class A2s and the A4 which destroyed during the war, British Railways withdrew the LNER Pacifics from stock between 1959 and 1966. The W1 was withdrawn in 1959.

Summary of Withdrawals by BR
Year	A1/1	Class A1	Class A2/1	Class A2/2	Class A2/3	Class A2	Class A3	Class A4	Total
1959	0	0	0	2	0	0	1	0	3
1960	0	0	3	3	0	0	0	0	6
1961	0	0	1	1	0	0	6	0	8
1962	1	6	0	0	8	8	13	4	40
1963	0	6	0	0	4	2	33	11	56
1964	0	11	0	0	0	0	23	7	41
1965	0	24	0	0	3	2	2	6	37
1966	0	2	0	0	0	3	1	6	12
Total	1	49	4	6	15	15	79	34	203

== Preservation ==
A total of eight original LNER Pacifics have been preserved; six of these are A4s (of which two are in North America), one A3 and one Peppercorn A2.

Preserved LNER Pacifics
LNER No.	LNER 1946 No.	BR No.	Name	Class		
4498	7	60007	Sir Nigel Gresley	A4	North Yorkshire Moors Railway	Operational and approved for mainline use.
4496	8	60008	Dwight D Eisenhower	A4	National Railroad Museum, Green Bay, Wisconsin	Static display
4488	9	60009	Union of South Africa	A4	Thornton, Fife	Boiler Ticket expired
4489	10	60010	Dominion of Canada	A4	Canadian Railway Museum	Static display
4464	19	60019	Bittern	A4	Mid Hants Watercress Railway	Static display
4468	22	60022	Mallard	A4	National Railway Museum, York	Static display
4472	103	60103	Flying Scotsman	A3	National Railway Museum, York	Operational and approved for mainline use.
-	-	60532	Blue Peter	A2 (Peppercorn)	Barrow Hill Engine Shed	Returned to mainline running in July 2024

== Tornado ==
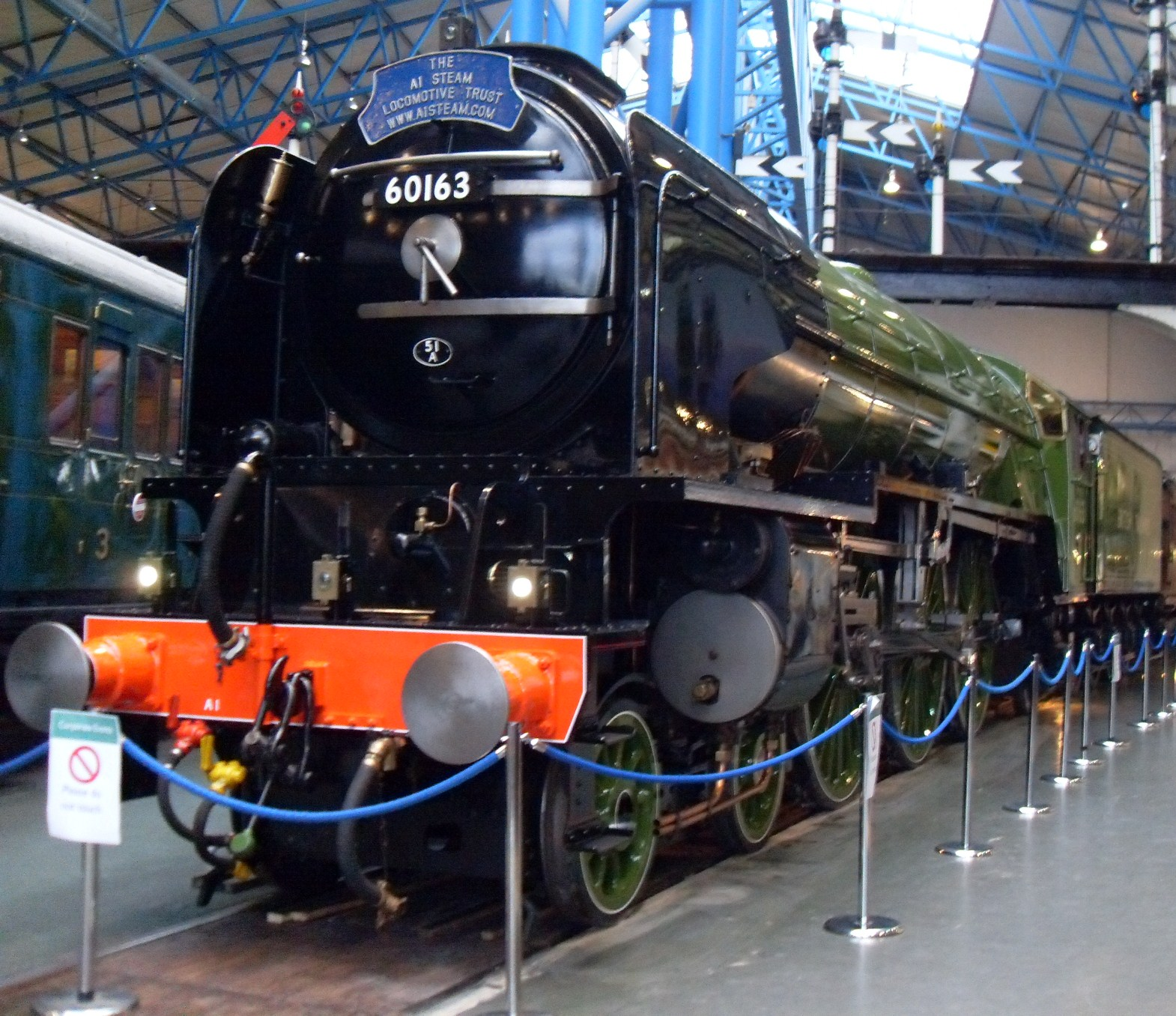
New build locomotive 60163 Tornado

In addition to the preserved engines above, a new build Peppercorn Class A1, 60163 Tornado was completed in August 2008.
