= GNR Class A1 1470 Great Northern =

First GNR/LNER Class A1 locomotive

1470 Great Northern
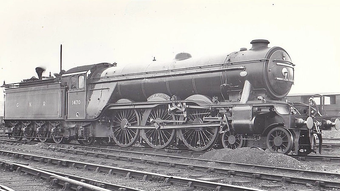
Type and origin
- Power type: Steam
- Designer: H.N Gresley
- Builder: Doncaster Works
- Serial number: 1536
- Model: GNR/ LNER A1
- Build date: April 1922
Specifications
- Configuration
  - Whyte: 4-6-2
  - UIC: 2′C1 h3
- Gauge: 4 ft 8 1/2 in (1,435 mm) standard gauge
- Leading dia.: 3 ft 2 in (0.965 m)
- Driver dia.: 6 ft 8 in (2.032 m)
- Trailing dia.: 3 ft 8 in (1.118 m)
- Wheelbase: 60 ft 10.6 in (18.56 m)
- Length: 70 ft 5 in (21.46 m)
- Axle load: 20 long tons (20.3 t; 22.4 short tons)
- Adhesive weight: 60 long tons (61.0 t; 67.2 short tons)
- Loco weight: 91.35 long tons (92.82 t; 102.31 short tons)
- Tender weight: Various
- Tender type: Various
- Fuel type: Coal
- Fuel capacity: 8 long tons (8.1 t; 9.0 short tons)
- Water cap.: 5,000 imp gal (22,700 L; 6,000 US gal)
- Firebox
  - Grate area: 41.25 sq ft (3.832 m^{2})
- Boiler pressure: 180 psi (1.24 MPa)
- Heating surface
  - Firebox: 215 sq ft (20.0 m^{2})
  - Tubes: 1,880 sq ft (175 m^{2})
  - Flues: 835 sq ft (77.6 m^{2})
- Superheater
  - Heating area: 525 sq ft (48.8 m^{2})
- Cylinders: Three
- Cylinder size: 20 in × 26 in (508 mm × 660 mm)
- Valve gear: Outside:Walschaerts; Inside: Gresley conjugated
- Valve type: Piston valves
- Loco brake: Vacuum
Performance figures
- Tractive effort: 29,835 lbf (132.71 kN)
Career
- Operators: Great Northern Railway; London and North Eastern Railway
- Numbers: 1470 (1922–23); 1470N (1923–25); 4470 (1925–45)
- Official name: Great Northern
- Axle load class: Route Availability: 9
- Withdrawn: 1945 (for rebuilding)
- Disposition: rebuilt as LNER Thompson Class A1/1

The Great Northern Railway Class A1 1470 Great Northern was the first of 52 A1 class locomotives. It also represented three distinct stages in the history of the British 4-6-2 "Pacific" steam locomotives designed by Nigel Gresley for the Great Northern Railway (GNR), a constituent company of the London and North Eastern Railway before the amalgamation of 1923, for which they became a standard design. Eventually Great Northern was completely rebuilt as Class A1/1.

== History ==
Great Northern is historically significant because it was the first Pacific to be built by the Great Northern Railway (GNR) as a prototype of the new '1470 class'. It was also the only original A1 to not be rebuilt by the LNER as an A3. As with most other former GNR locomotives, the LNER increased its number by 3000, making the number 4470. The locomotive was named Great Northern in honour of the GNR. Just after WWII, Great Northern was completely rebuilt by Edward Thompson as his A1/1.

== Liveries ==
As built, Great Northern was painted in GNR apple green with brown framing. In October 1923, it was repainted into LNER lined apple green with black framing. This livery had two variations, one with 'LNER 1470N' on the tender, and the other variant had only "LNER" on the tender and 4470 on the cab sides. Finally, in February 1942, it was repainted plain black, lettered "LNER". In July 1942, the LNER started using the simplified lettering "NE" on black locomotives, and 4470 may have been so treated after that date.

The locomotive originally bore its number 1470 on the cab side. When first repainted into LNER livery, the number was altered to 1470N, which was placed on the tender, below the letters "LNER". In March 1925, it was renumbered 4470, and at some point after May 1928, the number was moved back to the cab sides.

== Rebuild ==
Great Northern was rebuilt once in its career, by the LNER to the design of Edward Thompson to become his A1/1.

== Models ==
Hornby released a OO gauge model of Great Northern as built in early LNER style apple green livery with black framework, and original tender with "LNER 1470N" written on both sides. L.H Loveless & Co also released an O gauge model of Great Northern in its original GNR Apple Green Livery with a brown chassis and framework.
