= LNER Class O1 =

The London and North Eastern Railway (LNER) Class O1 was used for two different types of steam locomotive at different times:

- GNR Class O1 (reclassified O3 in 1944)
- LNER Thompson Class O1
