= LNER Class A2 =

British steam locomotive class (1922–1937)

LNER Raven Class A2
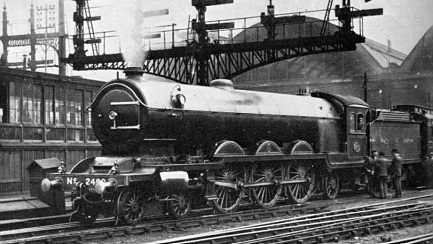
- Raven Class A2 2400 on trial at King's Cross Station in June 1923
Type and origin
- Power type: Steam
- Designer: Vincent Raven
- Builder: NER/LNER Darlington Works
- Build date: 1922 (2), 1924 (3)
- Total produced: 5
Specifications
- Configuration
  - Whyte: 4-6-2
  - UIC: 2′C1′ h3
- Gauge: 4 ft 8 1/2 in (1,435 mm)
- Leading dia.: 3 ft 1.25 in (0.946 m)
- Driver dia.: 6 ft 8 in (2.032 m)
- Trailing dia.: 3 ft 9.25 in (1.149 m)
- Length: 48 ft 8 1/8 in (14.8 m)
- Width: 8 ft 10 in (2.7 m)
- Height: 13 ft 3 in (4.0 m)
- Fuel type: Coal
- Fuel capacity: 5.5 long tons (5.6 t)
- Water cap.: 4,125 imp gal (18,750 L)
- Boiler pressure: 200 psi (1.38 MPa) (most), 180 psi (1.24 MPa) (2404)
- Cylinders: Three
- Cylinder size: 19 in × 26 in (483 mm × 660 mm)
- Valve gear: Stephenson
- Valve type: 8 3/4-inch (220 mm) piston valves
Performance figures
- Tractive effort: 29,918 lbf (133.08 kN) (NER boiler), 26,926 lbf (119.77 kN) (2404 with A1 boiler)
Career
- Operators: North Eastern Railway; London and North Eastern Railway
- Numbers: 2400–2404
- Withdrawn: 1936–1937
- Disposition: All scrapped

The first London and North Eastern Railway (LNER) Class A2 was a class of 4-6-2 steam locomotive designed by Vincent Raven for the North Eastern Railway (as NER class 4.6.2). Two were built by the NER in 1922 before the grouping and another three by the LNER in 1924. Their LNER numbers were 2400–2404. All five locomotives were named by the LNER.

== Origins ==
The NER was the largest and most prosperous of the railway companies that would make up the LNER from 1923 and provided the general manager of the new railway company. However the chief mechanical engineer of the NER, Sir Vincent Raven was at retirement age and the new post was eventually offered to Nigel Gresley of the Great Northern Railway. He had introduced a powerful new A1 Class Pacific in April 1922, and Raven was anxious to show that the NER could keep up with the race for increased power. Raven's rival design was authorised at the same time as the introduction of the A1 class publicised in the railway press in July 1922 although the first two examples did not appear from Darlington Railway Works until late December, and only one of them ran before the beginning of the LNER.

== Design ==
The new class was an enlarged version of the successful Z class Atlantics (later LNER C7 class) with a larger boiler, larger cylinders and wide firebox. The boiler pressure was also increased to 200 psi (1.38 MPa). They shared with the Gresley K3 class the record for the largest diameter boiler in Britain, at 6 ft (1.83 m). Also, because of the great length of their parallel boilers, the locomotives earned the nickname 'Skittle-alleys'. The locomotives were originally built with NER 6-wheel tenders, but they were replaced by Gresley 8-wheel "new type" non-corridor tenders in 1934–35.

Components for three further examples of the class had been prepared by Darlington works, and construction of these was authorised in February 1923. This was the same month that Nigel Gresley took up office and may have been ordered without his knowledge. These locomotives appeared in March 1924. However, comparative trials between the first two examples of the A1 and A2 classes conducted in the summer of 1923 showed that the A1 was a more technically advanced machine and no more Raven A2s were built. Thus the A1 was chosen as the LNER's standard express passenger locomotive.

== Performance ==
The performance of the locomotives was adequate for the needs of their intended use on the East Coast Main Line between York and Edinburgh and they reportedly steamed better than the A1 class, but burnt more coal. Their long wheelbase 40 ft 5 in (12.32 m) limited the other routes which they could operate.

In an attempt to improve the efficiency of the class Gresley rebuilt No. 2404 with an A1-style taper boiler in 1929, reducing the boiler pressure to 180 psi (1.24 MPa) but no noticeable improvement was achieved. Therefore, once the locomotives came due for heavy repair during 1936-37 they were all withdrawn from service and scrapped.

== Assessment ==
According to the Railway Correspondence and Travel Society survey of the Locomotives of the LNER. 'the design was an unhappy swan-song to the North Eastern locomotive development - it was their biggest, but somewhat below the best that Darlington could do.' In the opinion of Allen, 'prestige rather than real need was the predominant consideration; in the design.

== Stock list ==
| LNER No. | Name | Built | Withdrawn | Notes |
|---|---|---|---|---|
| 2400 | City of Newcastle | December 1922 | April 1937 | Was converted to a stationary boiler at Darlington Works in 1937, scrapped in May 1939 |
| 2401 | City of Kingston upon Hull | December 1922 | July 1936 | |
| 2402 | City of York | March 1924 | July 1936 | First withdrawn locomotive built by the LNER |
| 2403 | City of Durham | March 1924 | May 1937 | |
| 2404 | City of Ripon | March 1924 | February 1937 | Fitted with modified A1 boiler in September 1929 |
