= LNER Gresley Classes A1 and A3 =

Class of 4-6-2 pacific locomotive designed by Sir Nigel Gresley

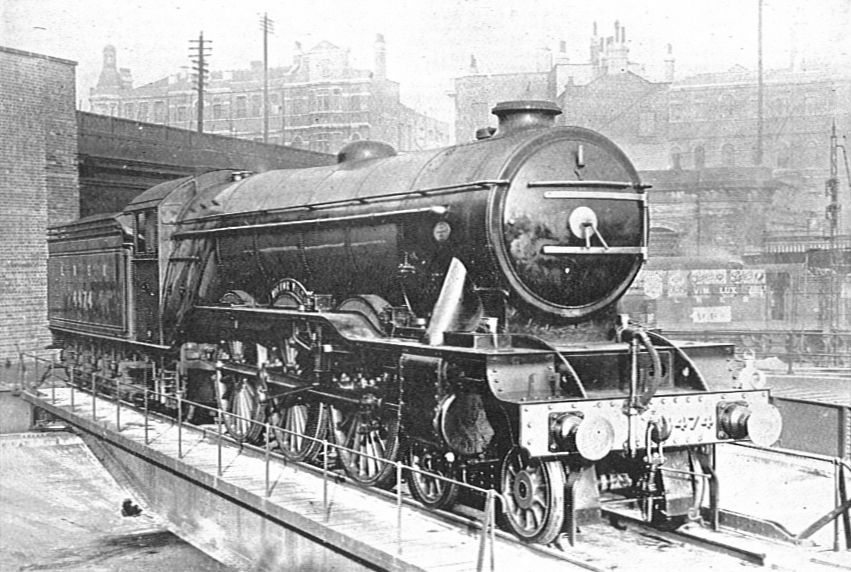
- Class A1 4474 Victor Wild at Kings Cross Station Yard
Type and origin
- Power type: Steam
- Designer: Nigel Gresley
- Builder: Doncaster Works (59); North British Locomotive Co. (20)
- Build date: 1922–1935
- Total produced: A1: 52; A3: 51 rebuilt + 27 new (78); Total: 79
- Rebuild date: 1928–1949
- Number rebuilt: 51
Specifications
- Configuration
  - Whyte: 4-6-2
  - UIC: 2′C1 h3
- Gauge: 4 ft 8 1/2 in (1,435 mm) standard gauge
- Leading dia.: 3 ft 2 in (0.965 m)
- Driver dia.: 6 ft 8 in (2.032 m)
- Trailing dia.: 3 ft 8 in (1.118 m)
- Wheelbase: 60 ft 10.6 in (18.56 m)
- Length: 70 ft 5 in (21.46 m)
- Height: 13 ft 1 in (3.99 m) (first 11 A1s were cut back from 13 ft 4 in (4.06 m))
- Axle load: A1: 20 long tons (20.3 t; 22.4 short tons); A3: 22.05 long tons (22.4 t; 24.7 short tons)
- Adhesive weight: A1: 60 long tons (61.0 t; 67.2 short tons)
- Loco weight: A1: 91.35 long tons (92.82 t; 102.31 short tons)
- Fuel type: Coal
- Fuel capacity: 8 long tons (8.1 t; 9.0 short tons)
- Water cap.: 5,000 imp gal (22,700 L; 6,000 US gal)
- Firebox
  - Grate area: 41.25 sq ft (3.832 m^{2})
- Boiler pressure: A1: 180 psi (1.24 MPa); A3: 220 psi (1.52 MPa)
- Heating surface
  - Firebox: 215 sq ft (20.0 m^{2})
  - Tubes: A1: 1,880 sq ft (175 m^{2}); A3: 504 sq ft (46.8 m^{2})
  - Flues: A1: 835 sq ft (77.6 m^{2}); A3: 2,159 sq ft (200.6 m^{2})
- Superheater
  - Heating area: A1: 525 sq ft (48.8 m^{2}); A3: 1,104 sq ft (102.6 m^{2})
- Cylinders: Three: two outside, one inside
- Cylinder size: 18.25 in × 26 in (464 mm × 660 mm) (A3); 19 in × 26 in (483 mm × 660 mm) (A3); 20 in × 26 in (508 mm × 660 mm) (A1/A3)
- Valve gear: Outside: Walschaerts; Inside: Gresley conjugated
- Valve type: Piston valves
- Loco brake: Vacuum
- Train brakes: Vacuum
- Couplers: Screw
Performance figures
- Maximum speed: 100 mph (161 km/h)
- Tractive effort: A1: 29,835 lbf (132.71 kN); A3: 30,362 lbf (135.06 kN) (18.5×26 cylinders); 32,910 lbf (146.39 kN) (19×26 cylinders); 36,465 lbf (162.20 kN) (20×26 cylinders)
Career
- Operators: London and North Eastern Railway; British Railways
- Power class: BR: 7P6F
- Numbers: LNER (until 1945/46): 2543–2582, 2595–2599, 2743–2752, 2795–2797, 4470–4481, 2500–2508; LNER (from 1945/46): 35–112; BR: 60035–60112
- Axle load class: Route Availability: 9
- Locale: East Coast Main Line
- Withdrawn: 1959–1966
- Preserved: One: 4472
- Disposition: One rebuilt as Thompson A1/1; one preserved, one boiler preserved, one tender preserved; remainder scrapped

The London and North Eastern Railway (LNER) Gresley Classes A1 and A3 were 4-6-2 "Pacific" steam locomotives designed by Nigel Gresley for passenger service. They were initially intended for use on the Great Northern Railway (GNR), but became a standard design on the LNER after the amalgamation of 1923. The change in class designation from A1 to A3 reflected the fitting to the same chassis of a higher pressure boiler with a greater superheating surface and a small reduction in cylinder diameter, leading to an increase in locomotive weight and power. Eventually all but one of the A1 locomotives were rebuilt in this way, with no. 4470 being completely rebuilt as a Class A1/1.

The names for the locomotives came from a variety of sources. The first, Great Northern, was named after its parent company. Others were given the names of high-ranking railway officials, but most were given the names of famous racehorses. One was named after the company's most famous long-distance passenger train, the Flying Scotsman.

Only one member of the class survives: 4472 Flying Scotsman, which is preserved in the National Railway Museum's National Collection.

== Design and construction history ==
=== Class A1 ===
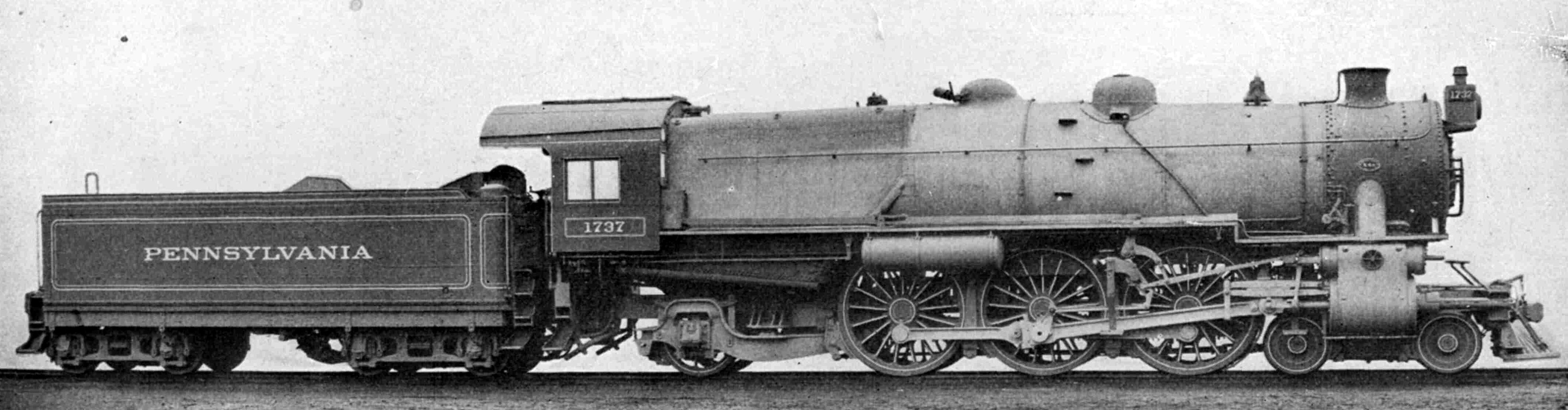
A Pennsylvania Railroad K4 locomotive, which inspired Nigel Gresley to design his GNR A1 class locomotive

The new Pacific locomotives were built at the Doncaster "Plant" in 1922 to the design of Nigel Gresley, who had become Chief mechanical engineer of the GNR in 1911. The intention was to produce an engine able to handle, without assistance, mainline express services that were reaching the limits of the capacity of the Ivatt large-boilered Atlantics.

Gresley's initial Pacific project of 1915 was for an elongated version of the Ivatt Atlantic design with four cylinders. Finally realising that he was in a design impasse, he took as a model the new American Pennsylvania Railroad class K4 Pacific of 1914. This in turn had been updated from a series of prototypes scientifically developed in 1910 under Francis J. Cole, Alco's Chief Consulting Engineer at Schenectady and the Pennsylvania's K29 Alco prototype of 1911, also designed by Cole. Descriptions of those locomotives appeared in the British technical press at the time and gave Gresley the elements necessary to design a thoroughly up-to-date locomotive.

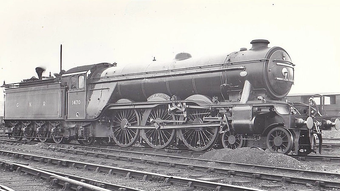
1470 Great Northern in 1922 condition with GNR-style tender and taller early chimney

The first two GNR Pacifics, 1470 Great Northern and 1471 Sir Frederick Banbury were introduced in 1922. The Great Northern board ordered a further ten '1470-class' locomotives, which were under construction at Doncaster at the time of the formation of the LNER in 1923. This included the future sole surviving member of the class, 4472 Flying Scotsman, then nameless and numbered 1472.

In line with the philosophy behind Cole's Alco prototypes, the Gresley Pacifics were built to the maximum limits of the LNER loading gauge with a large boiler and wide firebox giving a large grate area. The firebox was set low and rested on the trailing carrying axle. However, unlike the Pennsylvania K4, the firebox was not of the flat-topped Belpaire variety, but a round-topped one that was in line with Great Northern tradition. Features in common with the American types were the downward profile towards the back of the firebox and the boiler tapering towards the front. Heat transfer and the flow of gases were helped by use of a combustion chamber extending forward from the firebox space into the boiler barrel, along with a boiler tube length limited to 19 feet (5.8 m), features inherited from the K4 type but not present on the earlier Cole Prototypes. The boiler pressure was rated at 180 pounds per square inch (1.24 MPa).

The 1470-class Pacific was the third Great Northern locomotive type to incorporate Gresley's universal 3-cylinder layout. All three cylinders drove the middle coupled axle. The outside cranks were set at 120°, with the inside crank displaced by about 7 degrees to allow for the 1:8 inclination of the inside cylinder, this slight deviation from even spacing being a suggestion by Harold Holcroft of the SECR which enabled the outside cylinders to be perfectly horizontal. Gresley conjugated valve gear derived the motion of the inside valve spindle from the two outside valve spindles: this eliminated an inaccessible middle set of valve gear between the frames. A feature of the K4 that had soon been abandoned by the Pennsylvania Railroad was an unusual three-bar version of the Laird slide-bar. However, Gresley adopted this type of slide-bar for all his locomotives and it was later taken up by Bulleid for his Pacifics and by Riddles for the British Railways standard designs.

=== Adaptation to the LNER ===
The Great Northern Railway amalgamated with several other railways to create the LNER as a result of the 1923 Grouping. Gresley was appointed Chief Mechanical Engineer of the new company, which was the second largest of the "Big Four" railway companies in Britain. Realising the need for standardisation, Gresley adopted his GNR Pacific design as the standard express passenger locomotive for the LNER main line, designating it 'A1' within the LNER locomotive classification system. The choice was made after comparative trials with an equivalent North Eastern Railway (NER) Pacific, classified 'A2'. Between 1923 and 1925, 51 A1 locomotives were built; twenty by the North British Locomotive Company, and the remainder by Doncaster Works. However, Gresley's Pacifics had been designed to work within the bounds of the Great Northern Railway, meaning maximum distances of less than 200 miles (322 km). After the grouping, the locomotives needed to travel further.

=== Early improvements ===
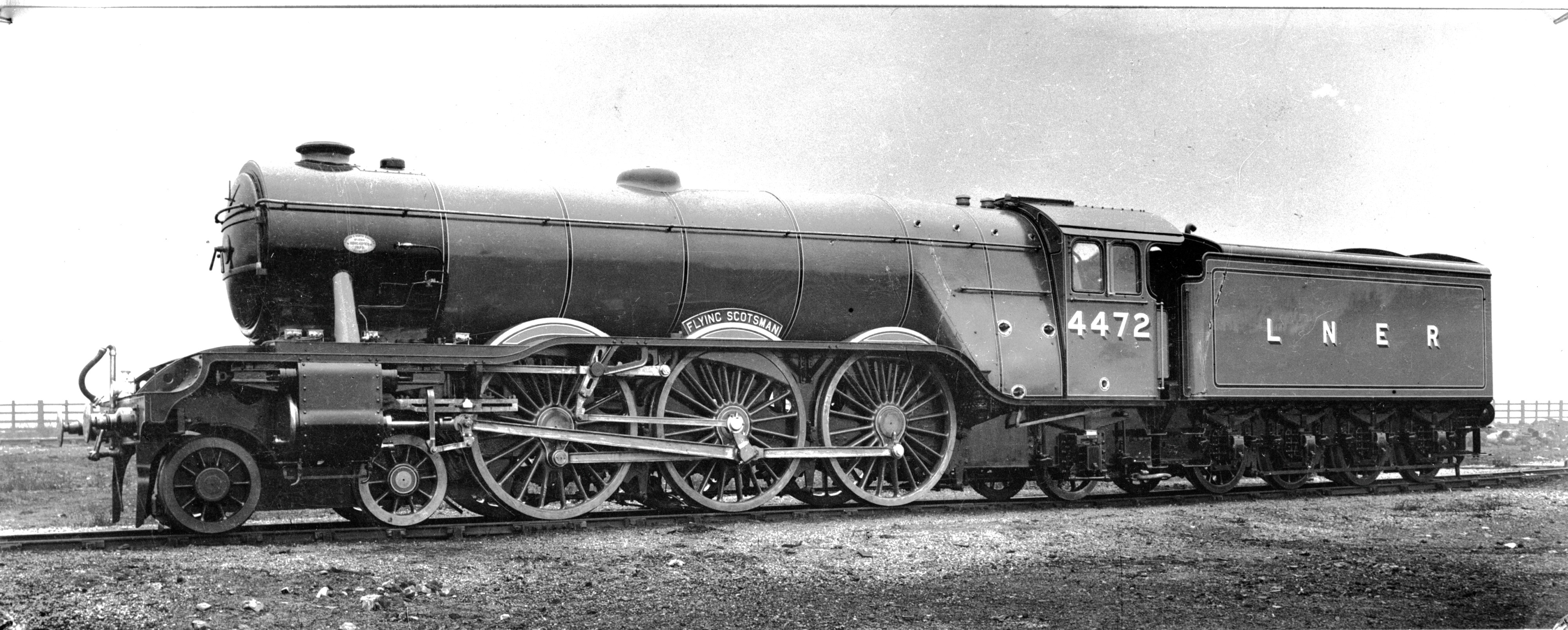
4472 Flying Scotsman in 1928-1936 condition with shorter chimney and corridor tender

In 1924, 4472 Flying Scotsman (renumbered and named for the occasion) was displayed at the British Empire Exhibition at Wembley along with the first member of the Great Western Railway (GWR) Castle Class, 4073 Caerphilly Castle.

In the following months, the two railway companies ran comparative exchange trials between the two types from which the Great Western emerged triumphant with 4079 Pendennis Castle. The LNER learned valuable lessons from the trials which resulted in a series of modifications carried out from 1926 on 4477 Gay Crusader. Changes to the valve gear included increased lap and longer travel, in accordance with Great Western practice; this allowed fuller exploitation of the expansive properties of steam and reduced back pressure from the exhaust, transforming performance and economy. The economies in coal and water consumption achieved were such that the 180 psi (1.24 MPa) Pacifics could undertake long-distance non-stop runs that had previously been impossible. There followed a complete redesign of the valve gear, which was applied to 2555 Centenary in 1927, with the rest of the class being modified in due course. Locomotives with modified valve gear had a slightly raised running plate over the cylinders in order to give room for the longer combination lever necessary for the longer valve travel. Another modification was made in 1927 when 4480 Enterprise was fitted with a 220 psi boiler. This was closely followed by two other locomotives which also incorporated variations in the cylinder diameter and superheater size for comparative purposes. This led Gresley to make a departure from Churchward practice by increasing the number of large tubes containing superheating elements: the greater superheater surface area in contact with hot gas raised steam temperature. (The presence of the larger superheater could be recognised from the square covers on each side of the smokebox, a feature that the locomotives retained throughout the rest of their existence).

Most of the locomotives built as class A1 (and all of those built later as class A3: see below) had vacuum brakes for both locomotive and train. However, the LNER had inherited a substantial number of Westinghouse-braked coaches, mainly from the NER, and it was necessary to provide some locomotives that were able to work trains formed of these coaches. Accordingly, fifteen (nos. 2568–82) of the forty A1s ordered by the LNER in 1923 had both Westinghouse and vacuum equipment for the train brakes, and on these the locomotive brakes were also Westinghouse. In 1928, the LNER decided to standardise on the vacuum brake, and as the number of Westinghouse-braked coaches subsequently decreased, the need for Westinghouse-fitted locomotives also fell. The fifteen A1s with Westinghouse brakes were converted to vacuum brakes between 1933 and 1935.

=== Class A3 ===
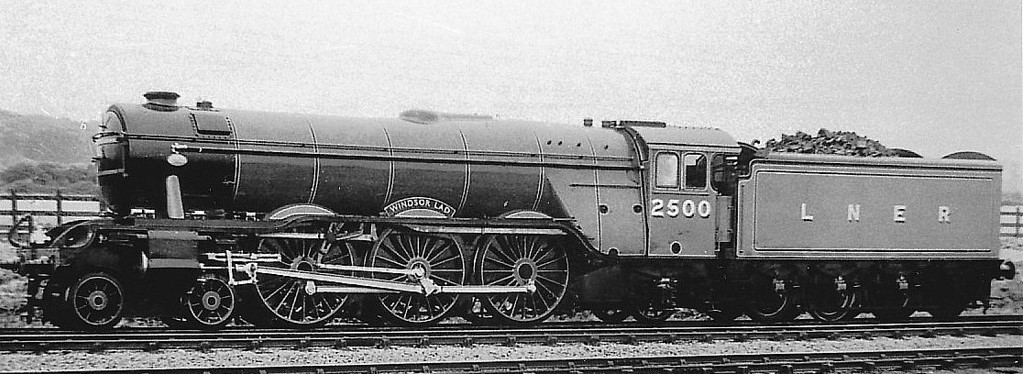
LNER Gresley A3 2500 Windsor Lad, from the final batch of nine delivered in 1934–35. These were the only A3s to be equipped with the "banjo dome" during assembly.

The outcome of the various experiments and modifications made to the A1s in the late 1920s was a new Class A3 "Super Pacific", the first example of which was 2743 Felstead. This locomotive appeared in August 1928 with a 220 psi (1.52 MPa) boiler, 19-inch (483 mm) cylinders, increased superheat, long-travel valves, improved lubrication and modified weight distribution. Another new development was the changeover from right to left-hand drive, less convenient for a right-handed fireman, but more convenient for sighting signals, resulting in the modification of all earlier locomotives.

Twenty-seven A3s were built from new, with little variation, except for a new type of boiler with a "banjo dome", an oval steam collector that was placed on top of the rear boiler ring. The first banjo dome was hidden beneath the casing of Cock o' the North of 1934; and was subsequently used in the A4 streamliners. The last nine A3 Pacifics were constructed with the device in 1935, and it became a standard fitting on all LNER large, wide-firebox boilers that were applied to new locomotives until 1949, except for a short period while Edward Thompson was CME. The banjo dome was one of the Gresley features he disliked. It was also applied to replacement boilers on the A3s.

Although all of the original Class A1 locomotives were eventually rebuilt to Class A3 specifications, (Note: Except 1470 Great Northern, which was instead rebuilt in 1945 as the single Thompson A1/1) it was a drawn-out process that lasted until 1949; 60068 Sir Visto was the last locomotive to be converted. The changeover to left-hand drive took longer, and continued into the 1950s.

=== Further experiments ===
Despite having settled on a new standard type, Gresley continued to experiment on individual locomotives, in one of which experiments ACFI feedwater heaters were installed in A1 2576 The White Knight and A3 2580 Shotover. However, the increase in efficiency was deemed insufficient and the apparatus was eventually removed. In 1935, 2544 Lemberg received Trofimoff piston valves of a design with automatically varying steam passages.

A3s 2747 Coronach and 2751 Humorist were subjected to smoke deflection trials following an accident on the London, Midland and Scottish Railway (LMS) due to poor visibility; this included the modification of the upper smokebox area surrounding the chimney. Originally the whole smokebox wrapper was retained in order to form an air duct, with the exit behind the chimney, but this was found ineffective. The next experiment with 2751 Humorist was to cut off the top part of the wrapper, but retaining the sloping plate that directed air flow upwards, and therefore lifting the smoke above the locomotive. The original chimney was replaced by a double stove-pipe variety, and miniature deflector plates were added on each side, angled to concentrate the air flow when the locomotive was on the move.

Smoke-lifting devices were not a priority with the normal single-chimney Pacifics. However, with its double chimney and subsequent fitting of a double Kylchap exhaust in 1937, Humorist continued to pose a problem in this regard and always had small wings on each side of the chimney. Finally, in the 1950s, it acquired Peppercorn-type deflector plates.

== Operational details ==
=== Initial performance ===
The A1 Pacifics met the performance demands of the early 1920s. They were certainly able to take loads single-handed that were beyond the capacity of their Atlantic predecessors as was shown in a test run made by No. 1471 Sir Frederick Banbury when it took a 20-coach train weighing 600 long tons (610 t; 670 short tons) over the 105 miles (169 km) from London to Grantham at an average speed of 51.8 miles per hour (83.4 km/h). However this was at the cost of heavy coal consumption, and general performance was well below the ultimate potential of the design. This was largely due to a regression from the earlier 3-cylinder 2-6-0 design, which was the first to have the standard Gresley conjugated motion combined with long valve travel. However, practical problems were experienced with components quickly suffering from premature wear, especially in the main bearing of the large 2:1 lever which had not yet been fitted with the very necessary ball race; excessive 'play' led to so much over-travel of the middle valve, that it began to hit the end-covers. In order to prevent this, when applying the gear to the Pacifics, Gresley fell back on the expedient of shortening valve travel even though that choked the exhaust at speed, was responsible for the heavy coal consumption, and negated most of the advantages gained by the locomotive's revolutionary design. However, by incorporating the Great Western-inspired valve modifications, the economies in coal and water consumption achieved were such that the 180 psi Pacifics could undertake long-distance non-stop runs that were previously impossible.

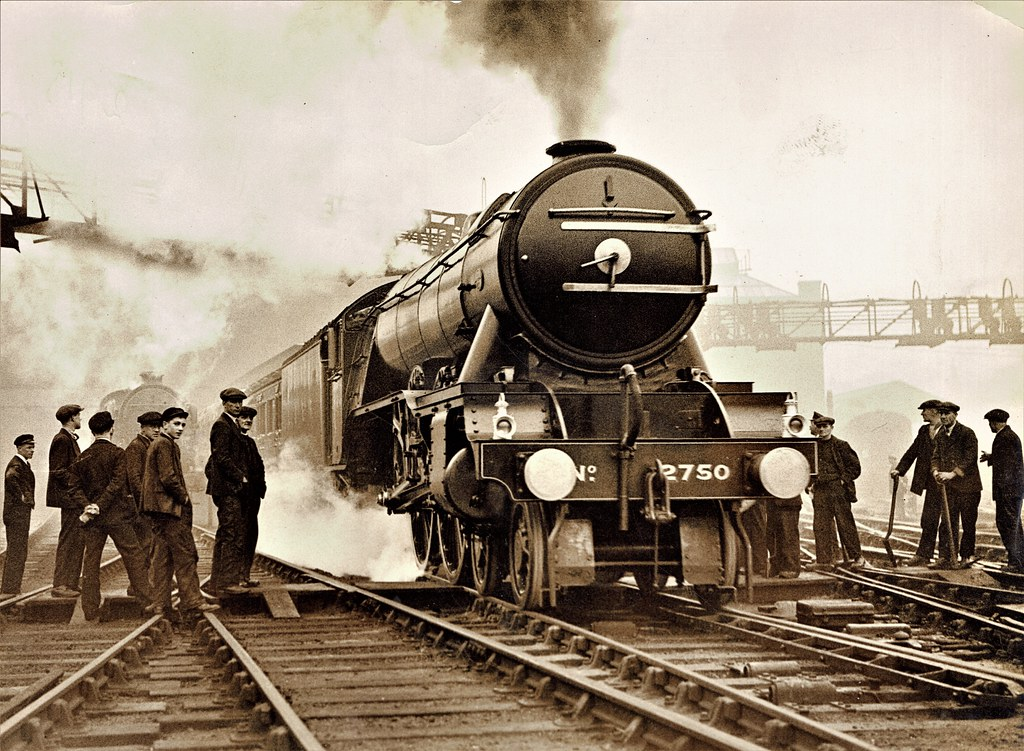
No. 2750, Papyrus

The first and most spectacular outcome occurred in 1928, when the Pacifics were called upon daily to work the Flying Scotsman train non-stop over the 392 miles (631 km) between London and Edinburgh. Initially three A1s and two A3s took turns on this service. The modifications also gave the A1 locomotives greater speed potential, and the proof of this came in 1933 when a high-speed 3-car diesel railcar service had been mooted. As this would have provided limited accommodation for passengers, it was proposed to use steam traction at similar service speeds with six carriages. A trial return run between London and Leeds was made with modified A1 locomotive 4472 Flying Scotsman; on the return trip with 6 coaches weighing 208 long tons (211 t; 233 short tons) it attained 100 mph (160 km/h) just outside Little Bytham in Lincolnshire for just over 600 yards (549 m). There were earlier claims to this speed, notably by the Great Western locomotive 3440 City of Truro, but this 1933 run is generally considered to be the first reliably recorded instance. On a later trial run to Newcastle upon Tyne and back in 1935, A3 2750 Papyrus reached 108 miles per hour (174 km/h) hauling 217 long tons (220 t; 243 short tons) at the same spot, maintaining a speed above 100 mph (161 km/h) for 12.5 consecutive miles (20.1 km), the world record for a non-streamlined locomotive, shared with a French Chapelon Pacific.

=== Wartime austerity ===
Along with the Gresley V2s, the Pacifics suffered from low maintenance during World War II, conditions for which they had not been designed. Excessive wear on the valve gear was discovered by maintenance crews after the locomotives experienced a significant deterioration in performance. Due to this, modifications were made to the valve gear and other components of the locomotives which improved efficiency and allowed for less intensive maintenance in times when labour was needed elsewhere. The modifications allowed the locomotives to operate more efficiently through the war until peacetime maintenance standards were restored.

=== Post-war recovery and nationalisation ===
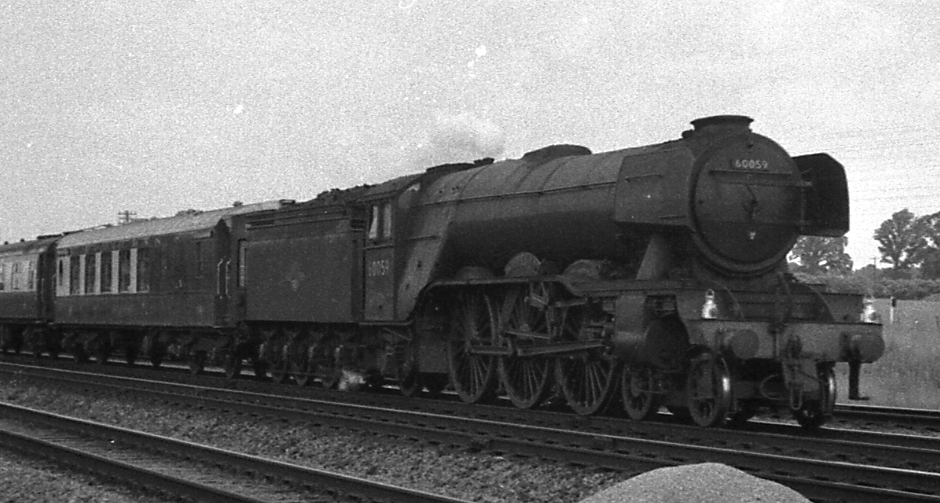
60059 Tracery in 1962, the last year of steam operation on the East Coast Main Line, with GNR 8-wheel type tender, double Kylchap exhaust and German-style smoke deflectors shortly before it was scrapped

After the war, the Gresley 3-cylinder drive arrangement continued to bring a number of practical problems, the root of which was the need for the inside cylinder to be steeply inclined in order to give space for the inside connecting rod to clear the leading coupled axle; at the same time, the inside valve spindle had to be parallel with the outside ones from which it derived its motion. This problem had been overcome by what Holcroft called a "twist in the ports" (the passages that carried steam in and out of the cylinders). A consequence was that the length of these passages was greater than that generally recommended, increasing "dead space", and this was combined with a shorter exhaust passage. The net result would be rather different working conditions in the middle cylinder from those on the outside. A contributing problem was that any elongation of the outside valve spindles was multiplied by the conjugated valve gear. Although this had been anticipated at the design stage, the overall consequence was that the inside cylinder had a tendency to give more power than the other two as speed increased, leading to the overloading of the inside connecting rod bearings, especially the big-end which was liable to overheat and fail. Various experiments were tried over the years to cure this chronic ailment, and it was only towards the end of the steam era that a real solution was found in Great Western methods of lubrication and manufacture for the big-end bearing. Other problems persisted, such as a stiff, insensitive regulator and overall design flaws that hampered maintenance.

In spite of all this and the introduction of more recent Pacifics, in the middle of the 1950s Gresley types continued to have a quasi-monopoly of East Coast Main Line express passenger services, and as the Sixties approached they went through yet another series of improvements comparable to those of the 1920s. The most significant of these was the fitting of the French double Kylchap exhaust system, which was entirely due to the persistence from 1956 of P. N. Townend, Assistant District Motive Power Superintendent at King's Cross locomotive shed. These modifications greatly reduced exhaust back pressure, making the locomotives more economical and free-running, and also kept the firetubes clean, reducing turn-around time, so much so that they were able to fit into the more intensive diesel locomotive workings. The Kylchap arrangement was already being universally applied to the A4 streamlined Pacifics, though with the non-streamlined A3 locomotives, the soft exhaust would cause the smoke and steam to drift into the driver's forward vision. The solution came in the form of narrow German-style smoke deflectors, which somewhat changed the appearance of the A3 locomotives in their latter days.

== Components ==
=== Boilers ===
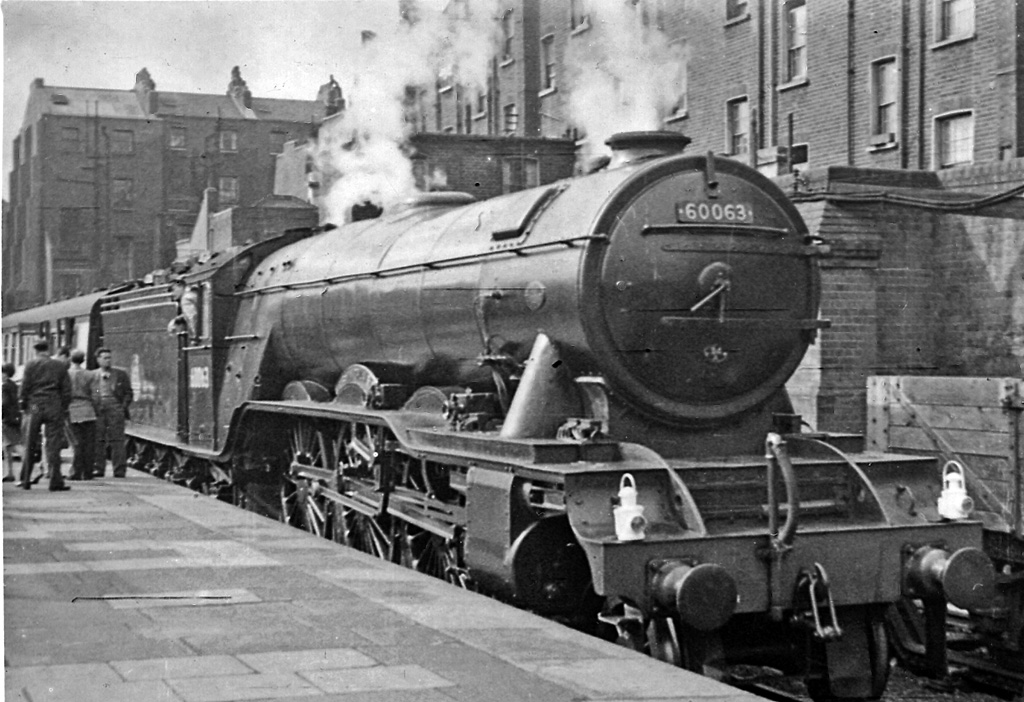
No. 60063 Isinglass, class A3 with Diagram 107 boiler

Four types of boiler were used with these locomotives. They were known by their page numbers in the LNER Boiler Diagram book, which was first issued in 1928, replacing separate diagram books for each main workshops.

- Diagram 94 (Doncaster Diagram 1 until 1928): This was the boiler fitted to all of the Class A1 locomotives until their rebuilding to Class A3, also to LNER Class P1 until 1942, and to LNER Class A2 no. 2404 from 1929. It had a round dome and a working pressure of 180 lbf/in^{2} (1,200 kPa). Diagram 94 boilers could be distinguished from the later types by the absence of superheater cover plates. A total of 58 of these boilers were built between 1922 and 1926: 52 with Class A1, two with Class P1, and four as spare boilers for rotation during overhaul. The evaporative heating surface was 2,930 ft^{2} (272 m^{2}). Most had a Robinson superheater having 32 elements, giving a superheating surface of 525 ft^{2} (48.8 m^{2}), but two had a much larger superheater, the Superheater Company Type "E", having 62 elements and a superheating surface of 1,104 ft^{2} (102.6 m^{2}) – for these, the evaporative heating surface was 2,877.4 ft^{2} (267.32 m^{2}). These two boilers were intended for the two Class P1 locomotives, but in the event they were fitted to A1 no. 2562 and P1 no. 2394 when new, whilst P1 no. 2393 received the boiler originally intended for A1 no. 2562, which had a Robinson superheater. This was done so that the two types of superheater could be compared directly on locomotives that were otherwise identical, working under similar traffic conditions. But the increase in thermal efficiency provided by the Type "E" superheater was less than expected, and did not justify the additional cost and complexity. The first Dia. 94 boiler – one of the two with Type "E" superheaters – was scrapped in 1934, and the last locomotive to carry a Dia. 94 boiler was No. 68, until December 1948.
- Diagram 94HP (Doncaster Diagram 1A until 1928): This boiler was used for the first five conversions from class A1 to class A3 during 1927–28, also the eighteen new class A3 locomotives built in 1928–30, and further conversions later on. Compared to Diagram 94, it had a working pressure of 220 lbf/in^{2} (1,500 kPa) and a larger superheater with 43 elements that gave a superheating surface of 706 ft^{2} (65.6 m^{2}) for an evaporative heating surface of 2,736.6 ft^{2} (254.24 m^{2}). The superheater header was too wide to fit inside the smokebox; it protruded through the upper sides of the smokebox, requiring two large square cover plates to the rear of the chimney. Twenty-nine were built in 1927–35, and nine more in 1947. Besides class A3, one of these boilers was fitted to P1 no. 2393 from 1943 until its withdrawal in 1945.
- Diagram 94A: This boiler was similar to Dia. 94HP, except that it used the "banjo" dome instead of the round type. Every A3 carried one of these boilers at one time or another, and two (nos. 2505/7) never had any other type. A total of 72 were built between 1934 and 1950. Besides class A3, one of these boilers was fitted to P1 no. 2394 from 1942 until its withdrawal in 1945.
- Diagram 107: This was the boiler designed for Class A4 introduced in 1935, and was used with class A3 from 1954. Of similar physical size to the earlier types, its principal differences were internal – in particular, the firebox tubeplate was 1 foot (305 mm) further forward, giving an increased firebox volume but shorter tubes; and by using thicker plates, it was designed to work at a pressure of 250 lbf/in^{2} (1,700 kPa), although when used on class A3, the safety valves were set for 220 lbf/in^{2} (1,500 kPa). Externally, the banjo dome was 1 ft (305 mm) further forward than on Dia. 94A, and the arrangement of the washout plugs on the firebox sides differed. The evaporative heating surface was 2,576.3 ft^{2} (239.35 m^{2}) and the superheater heating surface 748.9 ft^{2} (69.58 m^{2}). Thirty-six class A3 locomotives used this boiler at one time or another, some subsequently reverting to Diagram 94A. Besides classes A4 and A3, this boiler was also used on Class A1/1. A total of 88 were built between 1935 and 1961.

=== Tenders ===
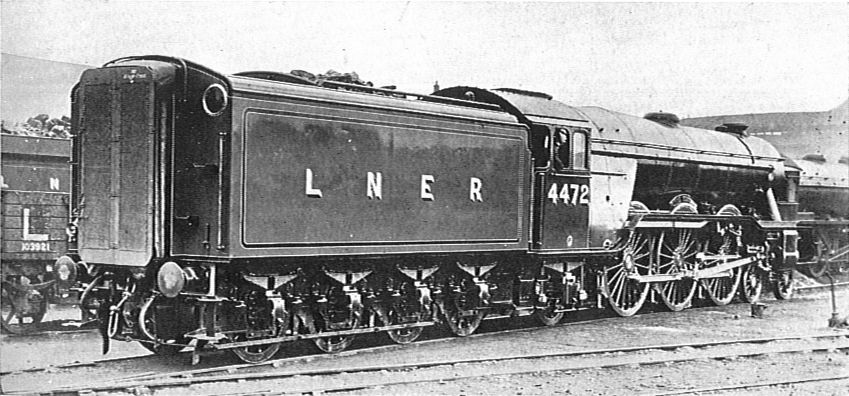
The 1928 tender commissioned for The Flying Scotsman train. Note the corridor connection and its porthole window.

The original A1s were coupled to a traditional Great Northern type of tender with coal rails of a design that can be traced back to Stirling days. The A1-variant was a much-enlarged eight-wheel version carrying 8 long tons (8.13 t; 8.96 short tons) of coal and 5,000 imperial gallons (23,000 L; 6,000 US gal) of water. In 1928, a new special type of tender body was built for the new non-stop Flying Scotsman train. This tender had a corridor connection and an access tunnel through the water tank. It was of a more modern design with high side sheets curved in at the top and had a coal capacity of 9 long tons (9.14 t; 10.08 short tons). In order to be able to pack an extra ton of coal, a single coal rail was provided on this particular series, but was later deemed unnecessary. Ten of these corridor tenders were built, of which six were originally coupled to existing Class A1 locomotives and the others to four of the ten Class A3 locomotives built in 1928–29, the remaining six Class A3 receiving secondhand Great Northern-type tenders from Class A1. For the seventeen Class A3 of 1930–35, a non-corridor version of similar design followed with 8-ton coal capacity and no coal rail. After the introduction of Class A4, the ten corridor tenders were transferred to that class, being replaced on classes A1 and A3 by an equal number of streamlined non-corridor tenders from Class A4. Tenders were frequently exchanged between locomotives during overhaul, and some locomotives ran with examples of all four types of tender at one time or another. Further series of both types had disc wheels instead of the previous spoked variety.

== Accidents and incidents ==
- On 10 May 1926, during the General Strike, locomotive No. 2565 Merry Hampton was hauling an express passenger train which was deliberately derailed by striking miners south of Cramlington, Northumberland.
- On 10 December 1937, no. 2744 Grand Parade was destroyed in the Castlecary rail accident when it ran into the rear of a standing train in snowy conditions, the other train being hauled by LNER Class D29 4-4-0 No. 9896 Dandie Dinmont. The driver and fireman survived with minor injuries although the locomotive and tender were buried under the four following coaches. 35 other passengers and railway crew were killed in the accident. As Class A3 locomotives were still in production at the time, a replacement was built with the same name and number.
- On 9 August 1947, locomotive No. 50 Persimmon was hauling a passenger train that was run into by another at Doncaster due to a signalman's error. Twenty-one people were killed and 188 were injured.
- On 26 October 1947, locomotive No. 66 Merry Hampton was hauling an express passenger train which was derailed at Goswick, Northumberland due to excessive speed through a crossover. Twenty-eight people were killed and 65 were injured.
- On 19 February 1949, a freight train became divided at New Southgate, London. The rear portion was able to run back and cross from the down slow line to the down fast line due to a signalman's error. Locomotive No. 60107 Royal Lancer was hauling a parcels passenger train that collided with the wagons.
- On 14 July 1951, locomotive 60058 Blair Athol was hauling the 'West Riding' express near Huntingdon when two of its coaches caught fire. Twenty-two people were injured, but all the passengers and crew escaped with no fatalities.
- On 14 November 1951, locomotive 60100 Spearmint ran away on the 1 in 44 Cowlairs incline approaching Glasgow Queen Street Station. A defective repair on a vacuum pipe had left the engine without brakes. The engine, which was scheduled to work the afternoon departure to Leeds, collided with the stock for the same train which was being shunted across the station, the dining-car crew were injured in the collision.
- On 5 August 1957, locomotive No. 60036 Colombo was hauling a passenger train when it crashed into the buffers at York station.
- On 15 December 1961, an empty coaching stock train was in a rear-end collision with a freight train at Conington, Huntingdonshire. Locomotive No. 60078 Night Hawk was hauling a freight train that ran into the wreckage. A third freight train then ran into the wreckage.
- On 29 September 2023, locomotive No. 60103 Flying Scotsman was involved in a slow speed rear-end collision with the Belmond Royal Scotsman ahead of a 100th year anniversary tour run at the Strathspey Railway in Aviemore, Highland. 5 people were injured with two being hospitalised, however both the locomotive and the Royal Scot suffered no superficial damage. The final two days of its stint at the Strathspey Railway were postponed while the RAIB investigated the cause of the accident.

== Names and numbers ==
The first twelve A1s, when ordered by the Great Northern Railway, were given GNR numbers 1470–81, some of which (including nos. 1480/1 when new) were subsequently given a suffix letter "N" after grouping to distinguish them from other LNER locomotives with similar numbers. All twelve were renumbered 4470–4481 during 1924–25. The 67 locomotives ordered by the LNER were given numbers 2543–82 (class A1), 2500–8, 2595–9, 2743–52 and 2795–7 (class A3), but not in numerical order. During 1943, the numbers 500–578 were allocated in order of building, except that the twenty built by North British in 1924 came after the twenty built at Doncaster during the same period. Between January and April 1946, twenty locomotives were renumbered on this plan, but then the scheme was revised, and the whole fleet became nos. 35–113 in the same order as the post-1925 LNER numbers, except that old no. 4470 was to become new no. 113. Under British Railways, the numbers were increased by 60000 to become 60035–113.

Until August 1925, only eight of the 52 locomotives then in service were named, four from new:

- 4470 Great Northern – built April 1922, named when new
- 4471 Sir Frederick Banbury – built July 1922, named September 1922
- 4472 Flying Scotsman – built February 1923, named February 1924
- 2563 William Whitelaw – built August 1924, named when new
- 2555 Centenary – built February 1925, named when new
- 4475 Flying Fox – built April 1923, named April 1925
- 4479 Robert the Devil – built July 1923, named May 1925
- 2562 Isinglass – built July 1925, named when new

Between August 1925 and February 1926, all the rest of Class A1 were given names. The 27 locomotives built as Class A3 were all named from new.

== Withdrawal ==
The prototype locomotive, number 60113 Great Northern, had been rebuilt by Edward Thompson into a virtually new design. The first to be withdrawn was 60104 Solario in 1959. Otherwise the class remained intact until 1961, and was still operating on express passenger work. The last class member to be withdrawn by British Railways was number 60052, Prince Palatine in January 1966. 60103 Flying Scotsman was withdrawn in 1963, and, after many other owners, has since been preserved at the National Railway Museum in York.

Year	Quantity in service at start of year	Quantity withdrawn	Locomotive numbers	Notes
1937	79	1	2744	Destroyed in Castlecary rail accident. Replacement built with the same name and number.
1945	79	1	4470	Rebuilt as Thompson A1/1.
1959	78	1	60104	
1961	77	6	60035/55/64/79/95/102	
1962	71	12	60049/59/67–69/72/76/78/81/93/109/111	
1963	59	33	60037–39/44/46–48/50/53/56–58/60–61/66/73–74/82/86–90/96–99/101/103/105/107–108/110	60103 preserved by Alan Pegler and used on the Main Line.
1964	26	23	60036/40/42–43/45/51/54/62–63/65/70–71/75/77/80/83/85/91–92/94/106/112	
1965	3	2	60041/100	
1966	1	1	60052	

== Preservation ==
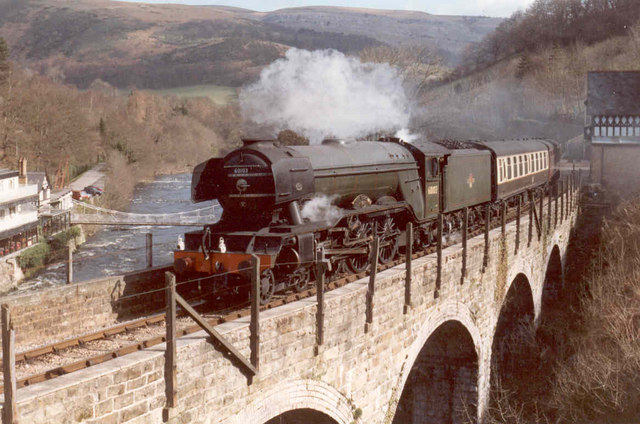
"Flying Scotsman" on the Llangollen Railway in 1994

The only example of the Gresley classes A1/A3 in preservation is 4472 (60103) Flying Scotsman. The locomotive was withdrawn from service with British Railways in 1963, and, after being saved from scrap, it was sold for preservation to Alan Pegler. After overhaul, Scotsman worked a number of railtours, including a famous non-stop London–Edinburgh run in 1968. After multiple private owners tried and went bankrupt in attempts to operate it, a much-publicised appeal in 2004 lead to Flying Scotsman being purchased by the National Railway Museum in York and it is now part of the National Collection. Scotsman now runs railtours for the NRM and appears at heritage railways around the UK, it is now claimed to be 'the most famous steam locomotive' and has become a symbol of British steam and the railway preservation movement.

=== Preserved parts ===
4472 Flying Scotsman uses the cylinder parts and boiler from scrapped sister locomotive 2506 Salmon Trout, which were acquired by Alan Pegler for Scotsman when Salmon Trout was scrapped. Similarly, Pegler also bought the tender of 2573 Harvester from British Railways before Harvester was scrapped, saving the tender from scrap. It is the tender currently used by Scotsman due to the corridor connection and greater footplate area.

== Models ==
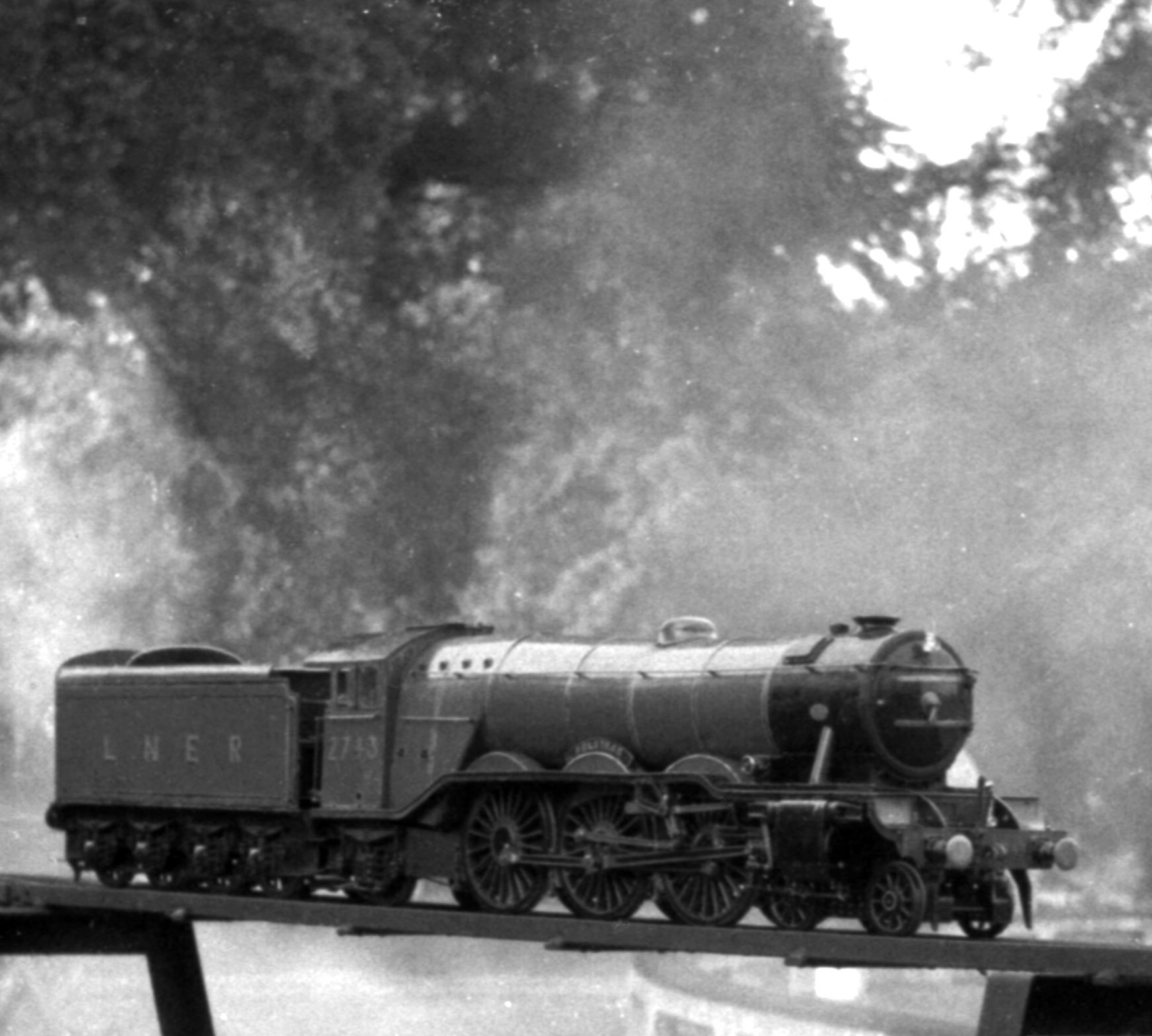
An 0.75 inch to the foot scale live steam model of the first A3, 2743 Felstead. The model had 3 cylinders and Gresley derived motion giving the characteristic syncopated beat. It belonged to Allan Allsop, then secretary of the Leicester Model Engineers and is depicted on the steaming bay of the Abbey Park track in August 1962.

Model railway companies Tri-ang, and later Hornby, have produced 'OO'-scale models of both the Gresley A1's and A3's almost continuously since the 1960s. In the 2000s, Hornby also produced live steam examples, re-using the chassis from the initial LNER Class A4 models. Trix and later Liliput made both loco drive and tender drive versions in 'OO' gauge. Although now owned by Bachmann, the models have never been resurrected. Other manufacturers have produced models in other scales, such as Minitrix, Graham Farish, and Dapol (N-gauge) and Bassett-Lowke (O-gauge).

== See also ==
- List of LNER Class A1/A3 locomotives
