= LNER Thompson Class A1/1 =

British steam locomotive class (1922–1962)

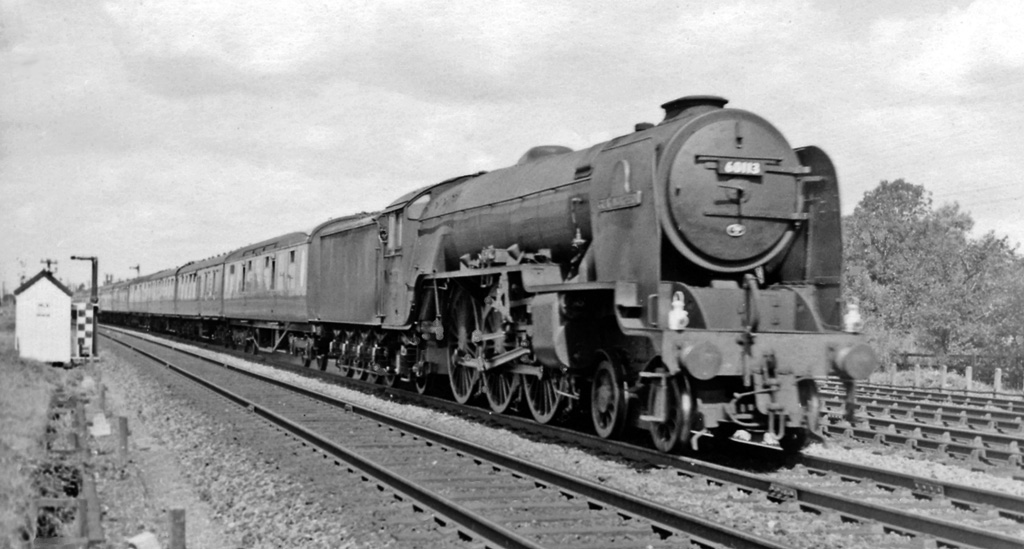
- The single Thompson A1/1 Pacific 60113 Great Northern near Peterborough in 1959
Type and origin
- Power type: Steam
- Designer: Edward Thompson
- Build date: 1922
- Rebuilder: Doncaster Works
- Rebuild date: 1945
- Number rebuilt: 1
Specifications
- Configuration
  - Whyte: 4-6-2
  - UIC: 2'C1' h3
- Gauge: 4 ft 8 1/2 in (1,435 mm)
- Leading dia.: 3 ft 2 in (0.965 m)
- Coupled dia.: 6 ft 8 in (2.032 m)
- Trailing dia.: 3 ft 8 in (1.118 m)
- Wheelbase: 63 ft 6.625 in (19.37 m)
  - Engine: 38 ft 5 in (11.71 m)
  - Coupled: 14 ft 6 in (4.42 m)
- Length: 73 ft 2 in (22.301 m)
- Loco weight: 101.5 long tons (103.1 t; 113.7 short tons)
- Tender weight: 60.7 long tons (61.7 t; 68.0 short tons)
- Total weight: 159.5 long tons (162.1 t; 178.6 short tons)
- Fuel capacity: 9 long tons (9.144 t)
- Water cap.: 5,000 imp gal (22,730.45 L; 6,004.75 US gal)
- Firebox
  - Grate area: 41.5 sq ft (3.86 m^{2})
- Boiler: 6 ft 5 in (1.96 m) max diameter
- Boiler pressure: 250 psi (1.72 MPa)
- Heating surface
  - Firebox: 231.2 sq ft (21.48 m^{2})
  - Tubes: 1,281.4 sq ft (119.05 m^{2})
  - Flues: 1,063.7 sq ft (98.82 m^{2})
  - Total surface: 2,576.3 sq ft (239.35 m^{2})
- Superheater
  - Heating area: 748.9 sq ft (69.58 m^{2})
- Cylinders: Three
- Cylinder size: 19 in × 26 in (483 mm × 660 mm)
- Valve gear: Walschaerts
- Valve type: Piston valves
Performance figures
- Tractive effort: 37,400 lbf (166.36 kN)
Career
- Operators: London and North Eastern Railway; British Railways
- Class: LNER: A1/1
- Power class: BR: 8P6F
- Numbers: 4470/113/60113
- Retired: 1962
- Disposition: Scrapped

The LNER Class A1/1 consisted of a single 4-6-2 "Pacific" express passenger locomotive rebuilt in 1945 from an A1 class locomotive, by Edward Thompson. It was intended as the prototype of a new design of pacific locomotives improving the A4 design of Thompson's predecessor Sir Nigel Gresley. No further examples were built due to Thompson's retirement in 1946.

== Background ==
When Edward Thompson was appointed Chief Mechanical Engineer of the London and North Eastern Railway in April 1941, he envisaged a new standardisation programme involving ten locomotive designs including two Pacific types. These were an express passenger type (designated A1) with 6 ft 8 in (2.032 m) driving wheels and a ‘heavy passenger and freight’ type (designated A2) with 6 ft 2 in (1.880 m) driving wheels. He was not able to proceed with his plan due to the Second World War but did try out some of his ideas by rebuilding Nigel Gresley’s P2 class 2-8-2 as A2/2 Pacifics and building the last four V2 class already on order as A2/1 Pacifics.

At last in July 1944 Thompson began work on designing his new A1 class incorporating everything learned from the twenty-plus years of Gresley's development of the 6 ft 8 in (2.032 m) Pacific locomotives along with the construction and operation of the rebuilt P2 and A2/1. Thompson had no desire to rebuild the Gresley A10 and A3 classes to the new specification as he believed they were an essential part of the LNER locomotive fleet, with Simon A.C. Martin suggesting that O.S. Nock's pamphlet produced for the LNER may have suggested so. Some commentators believed that he intended to rebuild one of the surviving Gresley pacifics of the A1 class to try out the new design.

== Design ==
Thompson's A1/1 design differed from his previous designs by adopting a divided drive with the centre cylinder, where the inside connecting rod was of a different length to the outside one, ignoring the presumed advantages provided by an equal length connecting rods and the subsequent valve events. This gave an elongated look with the resulting wheelbase being 38 ft 5 in (11.709 m) long, even longer than the Gresley P2s.

The final design omitted the inside Gresley conjugated valve gear in favour of three independent sets of Walschaerts valve gear. Steam was generated using a diagram No. 107 boiler, which was used on Gresley A4 locomotives, necessitating the use of A4 frames. The smokebox was carefully developed based on the practice set by the rebuilt P2 locomotives. Thompson followed Gresley's development with a double Kylchap chimney and his draughting arrangement. There was also a reversion to flat fronted cabs and cab floor out of safety concerns, similar in style to the Gresley A3 and in dimension to his B1 locomotives. Electric lighting and hinged discs were fitted to the front of the locomotive.

== Rebuilding ==
No. 4470 Great Northern, the very first Gresley Pacific, was chosen for this rebuilding rather than being retained for future preservation. There has been much debate on the reason for this choice. Some has blamed Thompson for letting his personal feelings towards Gresley cloud his judgement. O. S. Nock describes it as ‘the most disappointing and tactless act in his short and stormy career as CME,’ and C. J. Allen stated ‘he turned it into a machine of such hideous appearance as might well have made its designer turn in his grave.’

Simon A.C. Martin believes that Thompson lacked tact and has misread the attachment of the railwaymen to Great Northern and the selection of the locomotive was not his decision, but that of the Locomotive Running Superintendent. Such a decision would have been based on the proposed locomotive's age, total mileage to date, mileage since last shopping and overall condition. The late Richard Hardy, a draughtsman working on Great Northern stated that had the Chief Draughtsman Teddy Windle remonstrated with Thompson, Thompson would have replied that it was not his decision. As the first Gresley Pacific, Great Northern has been in service since 1922 and was being shopped at the time of the selection, hence its selection.

The A1 prototype was classed both as an express passenger locomotive and as a rebuild of an existing locomotive out of expediency due to wartime austerity measures. Very little of the original locomotive were retained, that being the driving wheels, parts of the rear cartazzi, the tender frames and wheels. The boiler and original frame were put into the spares pool with the latter being refurbished and used on another locomotive.

The rebuilt locomotive entered service in September 1945 in Great Eastern Railway Prussian Blue with double red lining and "NE" on the tender, possibly in tribute to three of four LNER constituents, though no written reasoning, instruction or notice were given. The locomotive was classified A1 while the remaining sixteen locomotives of Gresley's A1 class were re-classified A10.

There were also plans for streamlining all members of the new A1 class, but these were never acted upon, likely being unacceptable by the LNER Emergency Board due to wartime austerity measures.

== New-build Class A1 ==
In October 1945, the order was given to construct sixteen new locomotives to the new A1 plan. However, before these could be built Thompson had retired and Arthur Peppercorn had taken over as CME and he deferred building them until 1948, by which time he had altered the design to become the Peppercorn Class A1 Pacific design. In 1947 Great Northern, up to then the sole member of the class officially designated Class A1, was reclassified Class A1/1 in anticipation of these new Peppercorn A1s.

== The A1/1 in service ==
The rebuilt locomotive had excellent steam generation due to utilising an A4 boiler and had a tractive effort of 37,400 lbf (166.36 kN), which made it one of the most powerful pacifics within the LNER, surpassing the Gresley A4 with only the A2/2 surpassing it. In the same year with only three working months, it achieved 22,052 mi (35,489.25 km) engine miles, compared to the A4 locomotives working in Scotland, which had the highest mileage that year and averaged 57,065 mi (91,837.22 km).

It then went on to become the highest mileage Pacific with an annual figure of 68,304 mi (109,924.63 km), outperforming the next best Gresley Pacific by around 15,000 mi (24,140.16 km). Engine report cards from the LNER archives at the National Railway Museum shows that Great Northern's rebuilt form achieved 55,882 mi (89,933.36 km) per year, matching Gresley A4s and Peppercorn A1s.

For the rest of its working life, Great Northern achieved significantly higher availability than other Pacific classes on the LNER, with its first working year, 1946, achieving 83%. This is partially due to the difference in maintenance approach between the Gresley locomotives, which were often run to failure, while Thompson Pacifics had preventative maintenance and desired high availability.

== Renumbering ==
Great Northern was renumbered No. 113 under Thompson's 1946 renumbering scheme. It then became No. 60113 during British Railways ownership.

== Withdrawal ==
60113 was withdrawn on 19 November 1962 with a badly worn cylinder and was then broken up at Doncaster Works. By the time of its withdrawal, Great Northern achieved the highest mileage out of all the Thompson Pacifics and was one of the best locomotives in terms of overall availability for work. An attempt to save the engine from being scrapped was unsuccessful.

== Models ==
PDK Models produce a kit of the A1/1 for 4 mm scale / OO gauge.
