= LNER Class K4 =

Class of 2-6-0 locomotives designed by Nigel Gresley

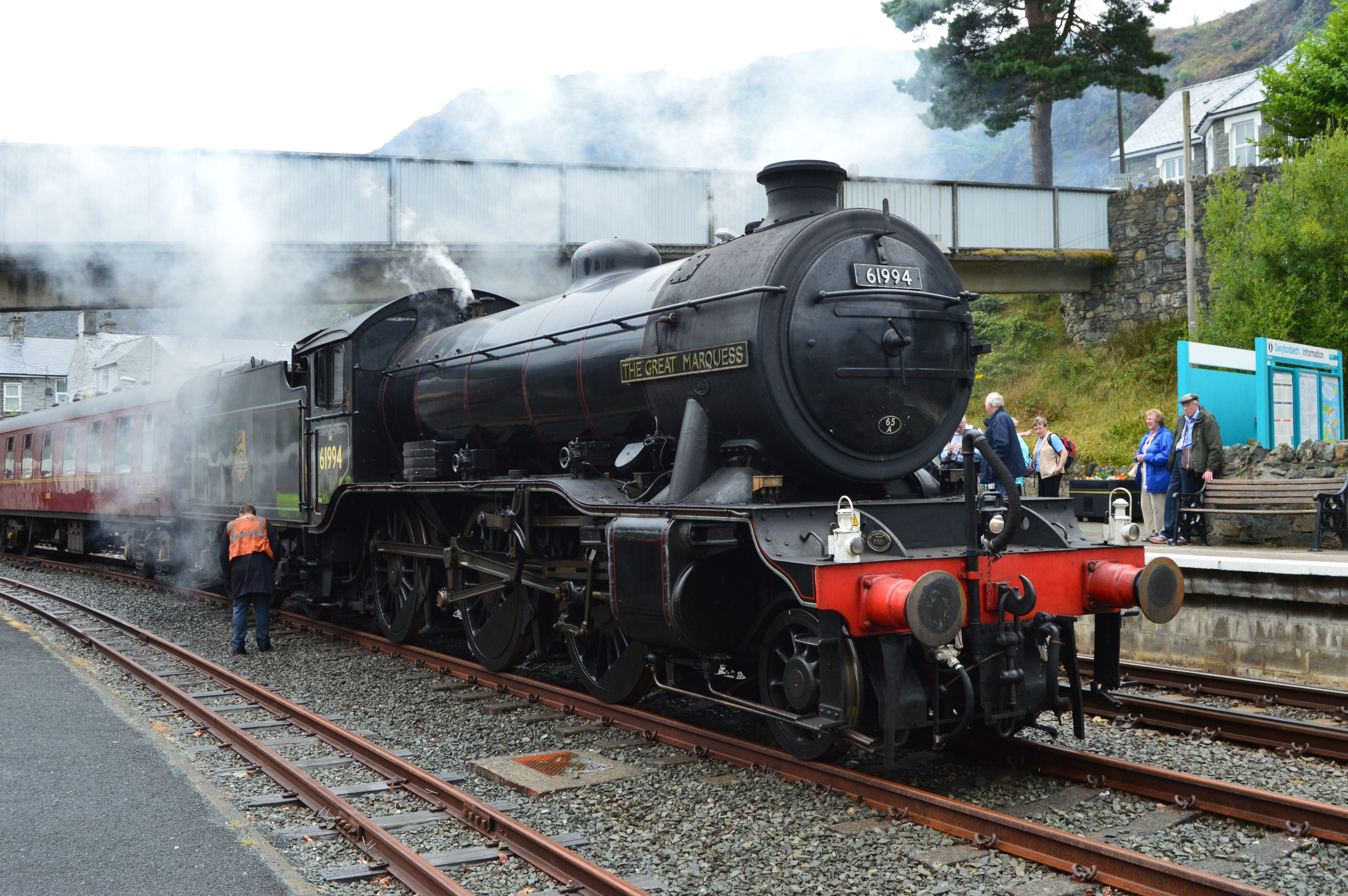
- The Great Marquess at Blaenau Ffestiniog, Wales
Type and origin
- Power type: Steam
- Designer: Nigel Gresley
- Builder: Darlington Works
- Build date: 1937-1939
- Total produced: 6
Specifications
- Configuration
  - Whyte: 2-6-0
- Gauge: 4 ft 8 1/2 in (1,435 mm) standard gauge
- Driver dia.: 5 ft 2 in (1.575 m)
- Loco weight: 68.4 long tons (69.5 t; 76.6 short tons)
- Tender weight: 44.2 long tons (44.9 t; 49.5 short tons)
- Fuel type: Coal
- Boiler pressure: 200 psi (1.38 MPa)
- Cylinders: 3 (two outside, one inside)
- Cylinder size: 18.5 in × 26 in (470 mm × 660 mm)
- Valve gear: Outside: Walschaerts; Inside: Gresley conjugated
Performance figures
- Tractive effort: 36,600 lbf (162.80 kN)
Career
- Power class: 5P6F
- Numbers: LNER (Pre 1946): 3441-3446; LNER (Post 1946) 1993-1998; BR: 61993-61998
- Withdrawn: 1961
- Disposition: One preserved, remainder scrapped

The London and North Eastern Railway (LNER) Class K4 is a class of 2-6-0 steam locomotives designed by Nigel Gresley for the steep grades of the West Highland Line.

== West Highland Line challenge ==
The North British Railway (NBR) West Highland line to Mallaig via Fort William, presented a combined triple operating challenge of: steep gradients; severe curves; and restrictive axle loading limits. Having used D34 'Glen' 4-4-0s, increased loads led to regular double-heading. Locomotive engineers proposed use of LNER Class K3, but they would not have been permitted to operate between Fort William and Mallaig.

Having proposed a new design based on a K3 boiler, in October 1924 a loan was made of a single LNER Class K2, which provided the required increase in power and adhesion. As K3s replaced K2 on the network, more K2s were loaned to the line, with the loan becoming permanent from October 1925.

With further increases in load and needs for additional traffic speed, in September 1934 Gresley instructed Doncaster Works to investigate the possibility of increasing the tractive effort of the K2s. After recommending against a design which increased boiler pressure 220 psi (1.52 MPa) and cylinder diameter to 21 inches (533 mm), in 1935 the Joint Traffic & Locomotive Committee signed off provision of a new design by reducing the 1936 build of K3s from 21 to 20.

The eventual May 1936 design was based on the 1924 proposal for a 2-6-0 with 5 ft 2 in (1.575 m) diameter coupled wheels, but with K3 cylinders, a K2 boiler, and a B17 firebox. The frame was 5 inches (127 mm) longer than the K3, with a design boiler pressure of 180 psi (1.24 MPa) giving a tractive effort of 32,939 lbf (146.5 kN), and an estimated factor of adhesion of 3.92.

== Prototype ==
The prototype K4 No.3441 left Darlington for Eastfield depot, Glasgow on 28 January 1937. After five weeks of crew training and being confined to goods work it made its début on a passenger train on 4 March. It soon became apparent that the 180 psi (1.24 MPa) boiler pressure brought little improvement in average speeds over the existing K2, and that No.3441 responded sluggishly when up against the gradients of the West Highland line. Gresley reacted by raising the steam pressure to 200 psi (1.38 MPa) which saw the tractive effort leap to 36,598 lbf (162.8 kN), with a corresponding reduction in the factor of adhesion to 3.54. The K4 could now demonstrate its true capabilities handling 300 ton trains and with maximum speeds around 60 mph (97 km/h) on level ground. An advantage of the newcomer was that it used only marginally more coal in working 300 ton trains than the K2s did with considerably lighter loads.

The successful trials with No. 3441 led to five more being built. Apart from the prototype Loch Long all were named after Highland chieftains and grandees.

== Operations ==
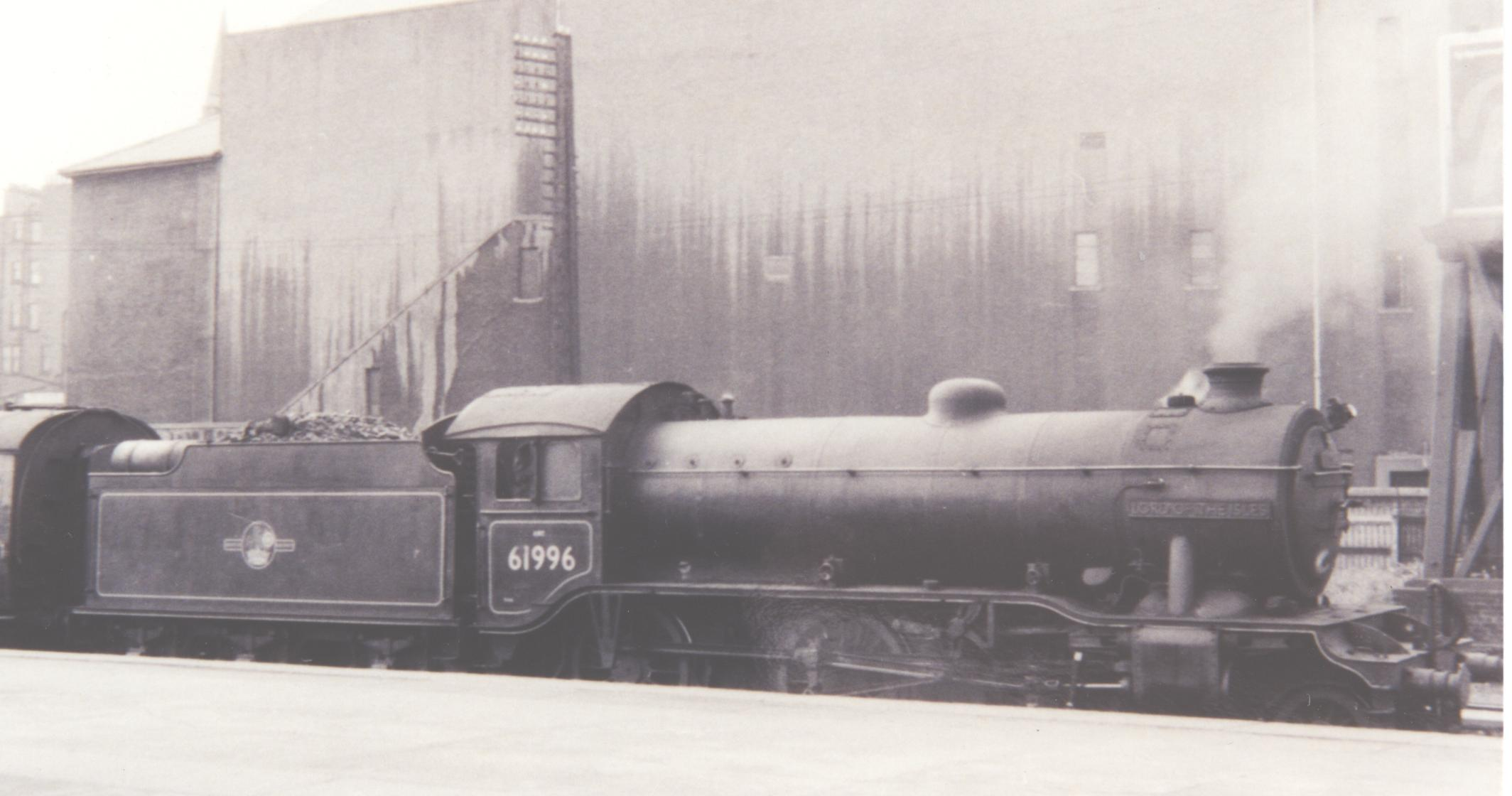
K4 61996 "Lord of the Isles" at Stirling railway station on a train for Oban in September 1958

The K4s quickly endeared themselves to the Scottish crews and, apart from some heavily loaded summer trains, eliminated uneconomic double-heading over the West Highland. However, as with all Gresley 2-6-0s it could be a rough ride at speed, and a locomotive designed to climb was not suited to the flat straight stretches of the line into Glasgow Queen Street railway station, or the 8.5 miles stretch alongside Loch Eil. Ride induced vibration was a problem on these stretches, and the middle big-end bearing would require regular nut tightening, with the middle connecting rod dropping off on one occasion: this resulted in increased maintenance inspections.

Crews began to prefer the LNER Class V4, but their lower power restricted their use and the K4s retained their pre-eminence on the West Highland line until the 1947 arrival of the first B1 4-6-0s, which replaced the K4s from Glasgow to Fort William. These were followed after nationalisation by an influx of Stanier 5MT 4-6-0s and the new K1s, that left the K4s increasingly confined to goods workings.

During the 1950s, the K4s' sphere of operation enlarged and they began to appear at locations such as Edinburgh, Perth, Forfar, Ayr and Tweedmouth. In 1959 all were concentrated at Thornton in Junction depot in Fife and all were withdrawn in October 1961.

== Numbering ==
LNER Number	British Railways Number	Name	Build Date at Darlington	Withdrawn	Notes
3441	61993	Loch Long	January 1937	October 1961	Scrapped
3442	61994	The Great Marquess	July 1938	December 1961	Preserved, owned by John Cameron
3443	61995	Cameron of Lochiel	December 1938	October 1961	Scrapped
3444	61996	Lord of the Isles	December 1938	October 1961	Scrapped
3445	61997	MacCailin Mor	January 1939	December 1945 (rebuilt) 1962	Rebuilt as Thompson K1/1
3446	61998	MacLeod of MacLeod	January 1939	October 1961	Scrapped

In 1945 Edward Thompson rebuilt 3445 MacCailin Mor into the first LNER Thompson Class K1. LNER 1946 numbers 1993–6/8 and BR numbers 61993–6/8.

== Preservation ==
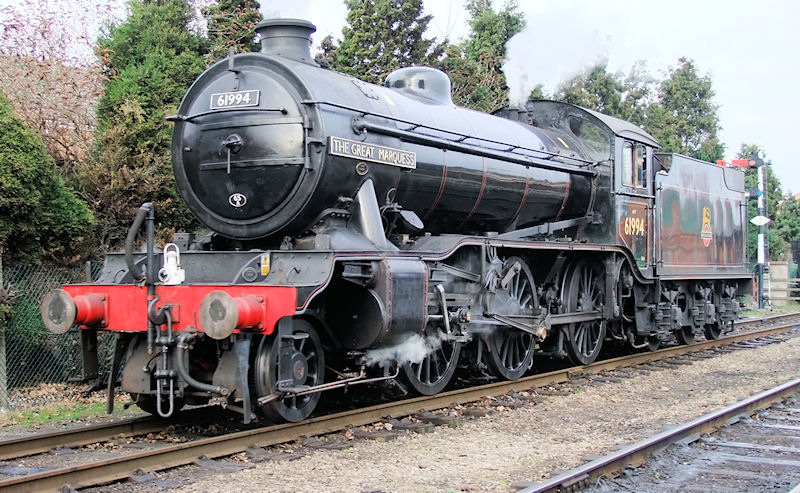
LNER Class K4 class 2-6-0 steam locomotive No. 61994 The Great Marquess stands at Loughborough during the Great Central Railway's Steam Gala January 2011. This was the engine's final outing on the railway before returning to Scotland.

One of the six strong class has survived into preservation, following the efforts of the late Viscount Garnock, who purchased No. 61994 The Great Marquess from British Rail (BR) and had the engine overhauled to working order. Based at Leeds No. 3442 undertook railtour work until forced into retirement by the ban imposed on steam working by BR in 1968. From 1972 No. 3442 was stored on the Severn Valley Railway (SVR) until 1980 when it was overhauled. In the mid 2000s, No. 3442 was bought by John Cameron and the locomotive left the SVR for overhaul at Crewe.

Following the completion of its overhaul at Crewe it was returned to service on the mainline, alongside visiting heritage railways around the UK. During its mainline career, it has visited many places that none of the K4's visited during their working careers for the LNER and BR. Places it has visited in recent years include: Carlisle, Barrow Hill, Redmire, York, Manchester, Whitby & Blaenau Ffestiniog. It even proved popular working railtours up the "Conwy Valley line" from Llandudno Junction to Blaenau Ffestiniog, the routes gradient being 1 in 47 heading towards Blaenau.

61994 is now retired and on public display in the Museum of Scottish Railways, Bo'ness, where it is receiving cosmetic restoration by a small team of dedicated SRPS volunteers. The eventual plan will be for the owner, The Cameron Railway Trust, to house the locomotive in a museum to be built on John's Balbuthie farm, along with 60009 "Union of South Africa". However, planning permission for the construction of Johns museum has yet to be granted by Fife Council.

== Sources ==
- Ian Allan ABC of British Railways Locomotives, part 4 (Summer 1961 ed.). pp. 33–34.
- Clay, John F.; Cliffe, J. (1978). The LNER 2-6-0 Classes. Ian Allan. ISBN 0-7110-0844-2.
