= LNER Thompson/Peppercorn Class K1 =

Class of 70 British 2-6-0 locomotives

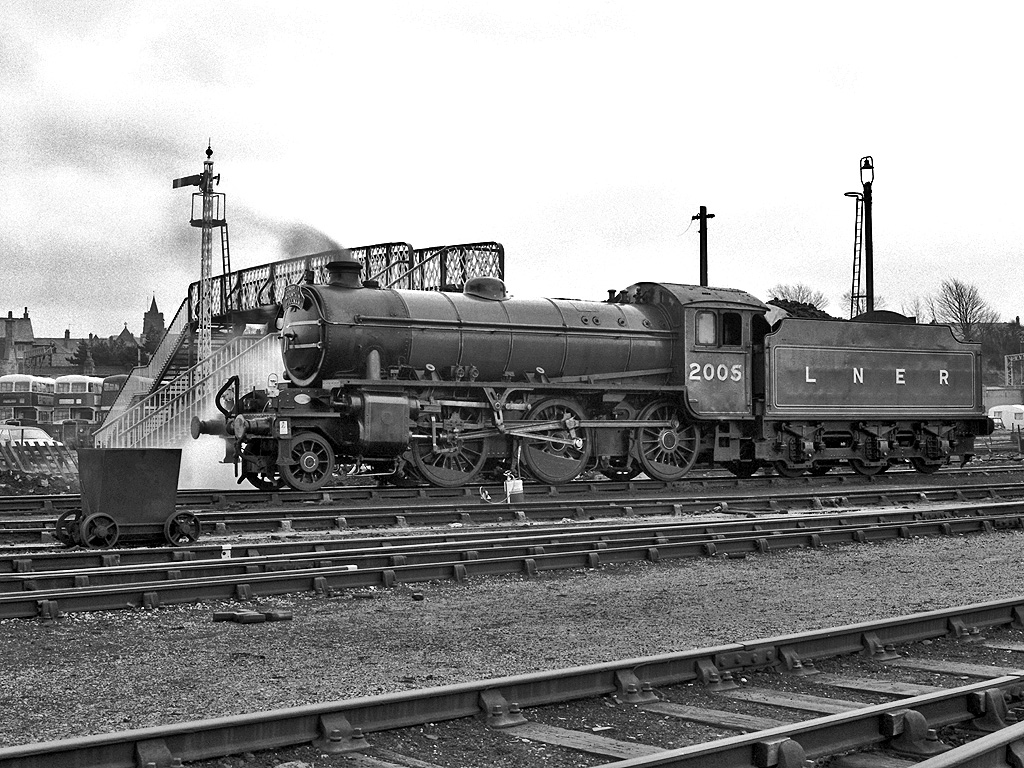
- Preserved loco No. 62005 (as "2005") at Carnforth
Type and origin
- Power type: Steam
- Designer: E. Thompson; A. H. Peppercorn
- Builder: North British Locomotive Company
- Serial number: 26605–26674
- Build date: 1949–1950
- Total produced: 70
Specifications
- Configuration
  - Whyte: 2-6-0
  - UIC: 1′C h2
- Gauge: 4 ft 8 1/2 in (1,435 mm)
- Leading dia.: 3 ft 2 in (0.965 m)
- Driver dia.: 5 ft 2 in (1.575 m)
- Length: 59 ft 10 in (18.24 m) over buffers
- Loco weight: 66 long tons (67 t)
- Tender weight: 52 long tons (53 t)
- Fuel type: Coal
- Fuel capacity: 7.5 long tons (7.6 t)
- Water cap.: 4,200 imperial gallons (19,000 L; 5,000 US gal)
- Firebox
  - Grate area: 27.9 sq ft (2.59 m^{2})
- Boiler: LNER diagram 116
- Boiler pressure: 225 lbf/in^{2} (1.55 MPa)
- Heating surface
  - Firebox: 168 sq ft (15.6 m^{2})
  - Tubes: 858 sq ft (79.7 m^{2})
  - Flues: 382 sq ft (35.5 m^{2})
  - Total surface: 1,408 sq ft (130.8 m^{2})
- Superheater
  - Heating area: 300 sq ft (28 m^{2})
- Cylinders: 2, outside
- Cylinder size: 20 in × 26 in (508 mm × 660 mm)
Performance figures
- Tractive effort: 32,080 lbf (142.70 kN)
Career
- Operators: British Railways
- Power class: 5P6F
- Numbers: 62001–62070
- Axle load class: Route Availability 6
- Locale: Eastern Region; North Eastern Region
- Withdrawn: 1962–1967
- Disposition: One preserved, remainder scrapped

The London and North Eastern Railway (LNER) Class K1 is a type of 2-6-0 "Mogul" steam locomotive designed by Edward Thompson. Thompson preferred a simple two-cylinder design instead of his predecessor Nigel Gresley's three-cylinder one. The seventy K1s were intended to be split between the North Eastern Region of British Railways and the Eastern Region of British Railways.

== Prototype ==
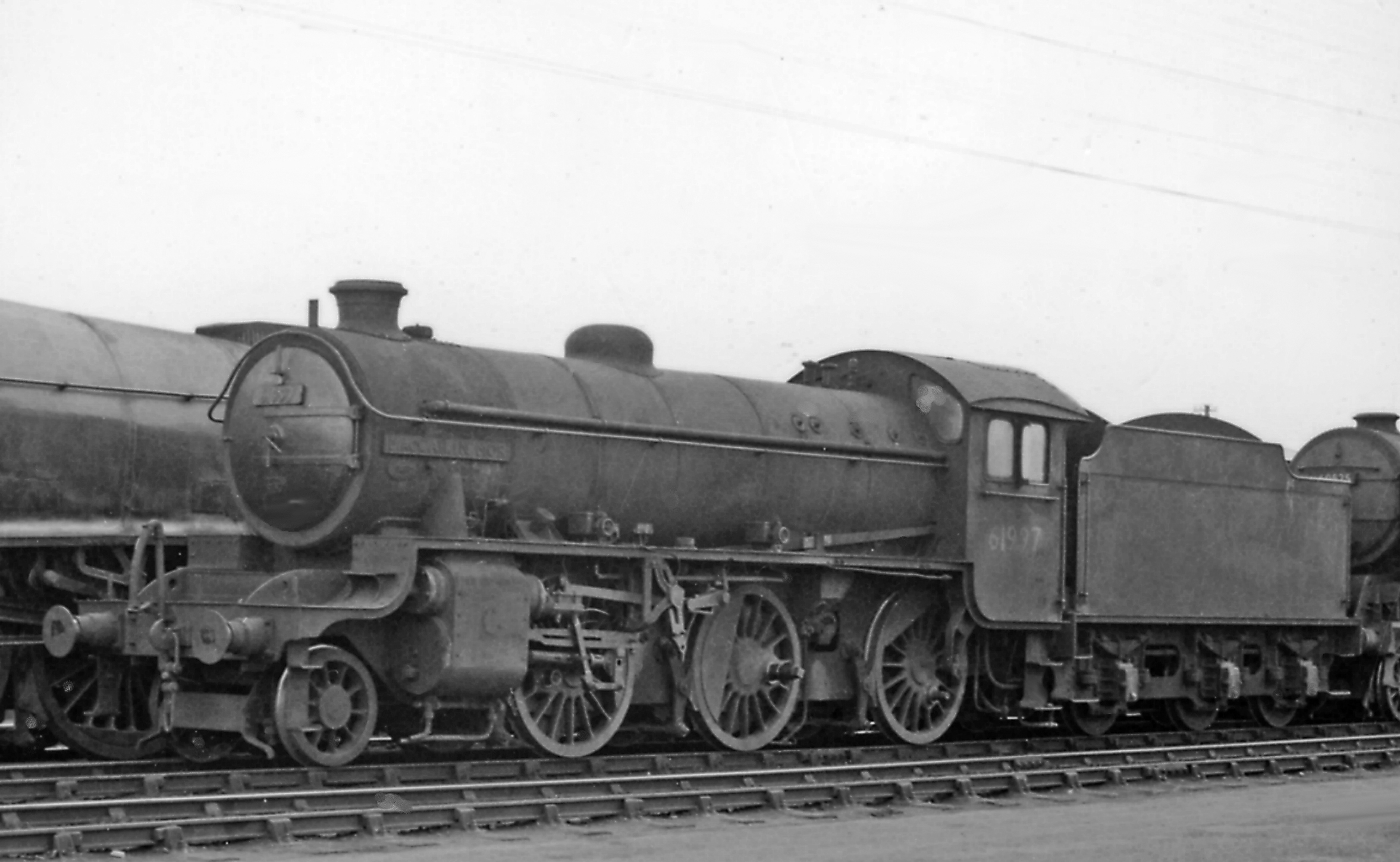
Prototype K1 No. 61997 'MacCailin Mor' in Doncaster Carr Locomotive Yard 23 April 1961

LNER Class K4 number 3445 MacCailin Mor was rebuilt in 1945 at Darlington Works as a two-cylinder prototype of the K1 class, designated K1/1. Thompson entrusted the rebuilding of No. 3445 as a two-cylinder Mogul to his principal assistant Arthur Peppercorn. This locomotive became British Railways No. 61997, and was withdrawn from service in 1962.

== Production ==
When Peppercorn replaced Thompson as chief mechanical engineer, he made the rebuild the basis for a new class of 2-cylinder 2-6-0. Several modifications were made. The running plates were redesigned to improve access to the cylinder steam chests and there were changes to the leading pony truck, the cylinder linings and the boiler. The new engines were also longer and received larger tenders that held 4,200 imp gal (19,000 L; 5,000 US gal) of water instead of the K4's 3,500 imp gal (16,000 L; 4,200 US gal) tenders.

An order for 70 of the new class was placed with the North British Locomotive Company of Glasgow. They were the last steam locomotives built to an LNER design, although all were delivered under British Railways ownership. Numbered 62001–62070, they entered service between May 1949 and March 1950.

== Operation ==
The Peppercorn K1s proved to be useful and versatile engines. They worked extensively over ex-LNER territory but were chiefly associated with North East England, and like their K4 predecessors, the West Highland Line. Like many post-nationalisation classes, the K1s had relatively brief lives. All were withdrawn between 1962 and 1967, but the last to be retired was ultimately preserved. They were capable of reaching speeds of up to 50 mph (80 km/h), or 45 mph (72 km/h) while running tender first.

== Preservation ==
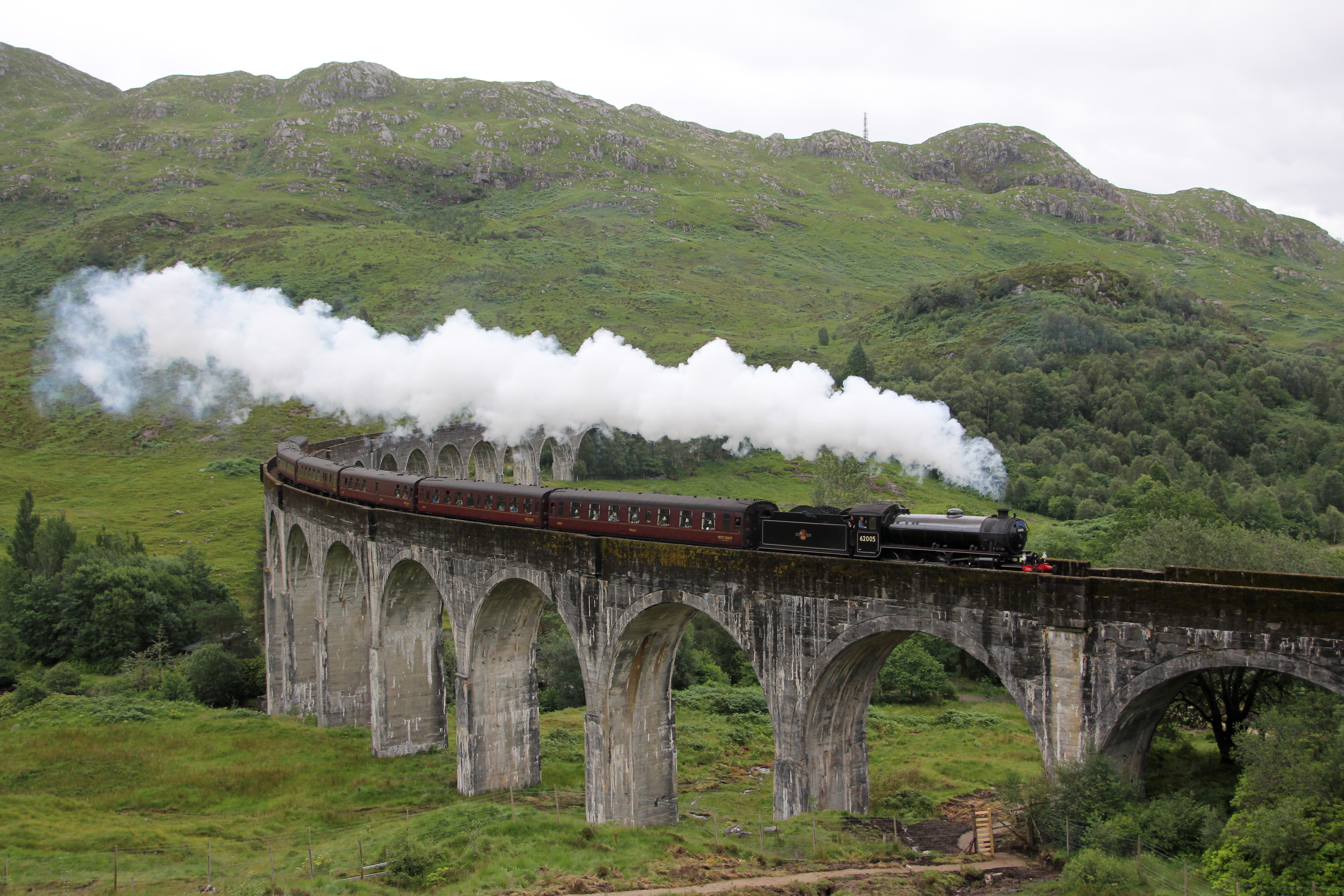
No. 62005 "Lord of the Isles" crossing the Glenfinnan Viaduct on the Scottish Adventure, July 2012

One example of the class, No. 62005, which was also the final member in service before its withdrawal, has been preserved, and is based at the North Yorkshire Moors Railway. It was acquired as a source of a spare boiler for the solitary preserved K4, but in 1972, the K1 was donated, still with its boiler, to the North Eastern Locomotive Preservation Group. It was also used as a stationary boiler at ICI North Tees Port Clarence Works for a period of 6 weeks. It was eventually placed into storage at Neville Hill where it was later obtained by Viscount Garnock, Geoff Drury, George Nissen, and Brian Hollingsworth as a spare boiler for the sole surviving member of the Gresley K4 moguls 61994 The Great Marquess. The plans for the stationary boiler fell through and the locomotive was eventually purchased by the 45428 Stanier Class 5 Locomotive Society Ltd and was later donated to the NELPG.

By 1975, the K1 had been restored to main line running order and made an appearance at the Stockton and Darlington Railway 150th-anniversary celebrations at Shildon, County Durham. Since then the NELPG has endeavoured to keep the locomotive available for use on the main line. While it is usually based on the North Yorkshire Moors Railway, 62005 spends most of its time on the summer Fort William-Mallaig Jacobite service (numbered as 2005 in 1988 at least), recalling memories of the K1s in Scotland.

The locomotive spent much of its early time in preservation numbered 2005 and in LNER apple green livery. This livery is not historically accurate, as the engine was built in 1949 after nationalisation and never had this livery when in service. It was repainted in BR lined black as No. 62005 in the late 1990s, and wears this livery to date.

In 2005, it carried the name previously carried by K4 61996 (LNER 3444) Lord of the Isles during its service hauling The Jacobite for the West Coast Railway Company.
