= LNER Class K4 61994 The Great Marquess =

Preserved British 2-6-0 locomotive

LNER 3442 The Great Marquess
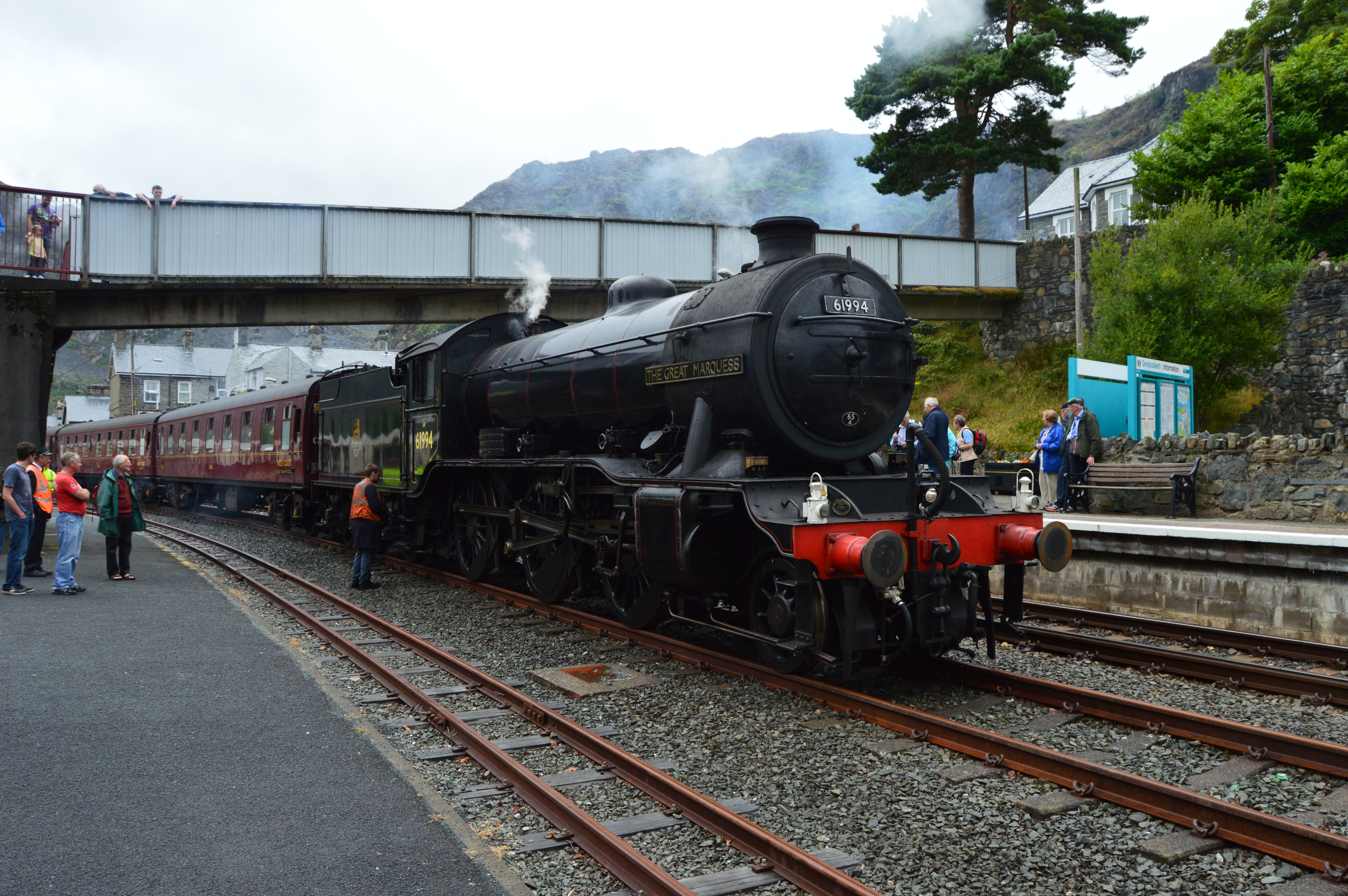
- The Great Marquess at Blaenau Ffestiniog, Wales
Type and origin
- Power type: Steam
- Designer: Nigel Gresley
- Builder: Darlington Works
- Build date: July 1938
Specifications
- Configuration
  - Whyte: 2-6-0
  - UIC: 1′C h3
- Gauge: 4 ft 8 1/2 in (1,435 mm)
- Leading dia.: 3 ft 2 in (0.965 m)
- Driver dia.: 5 ft 2 in (1.575 m)
- Loco weight: 68.4 long tons (69.5 t)
- Tender weight: 44.2 long tons (44.9 t)
- Fuel type: Coal
- Fuel capacity: 5.50 long tons (5.59 t)
- Water cap.: 3,700 imperial gallons (17,000 L; 4,400 US gal) (extended water capacity - originally 3,500 imperial gallons (16,000 L; 4,200 US gal)
- Firebox
  - Grate area: 27 1/2 sq ft (2.55 m^{2})
- Boiler pressure: 200 psi (1.38 MPa)
- Heating surface
  - Firebox: 168.0 sq ft (15.61 m^{2})
  - Tubes: 781.1 sq ft (72.57 m^{2})
  - Flues: 382.5 sq ft (35.54 m^{2})
  - Total surface: 1,421.6 sq ft (132.07 m^{2})
- Superheater
  - Heating area: 310 sq ft (29 m^{2})
- Cylinders: Three
- Cylinder size: 18 1/2 in × 26 in (470 mm × 660 mm)
- Valve gear: Walschaerts (outside); Gresley Conjugated (inside)
- Valve type: Piston valves
Performance figures
- Tractive effort: 36,600 lbf (162.80 kN)
Career
- Operators: London and North Eastern Railway; → British Railways
- Class: LNER Class K4
- Power class: BR: 6MT
- Numbers: LNER: 3442 → 1994; BR: 61994
- Axle load class: BR: Route Availability 6
- Withdrawn: December 1961
- Current owner: John Cameron
- Disposition: Static Display

LNER 3442 The Great Marquess is a member of the London and North Eastern Railway (LNER) Class K4 designed by Nigel Gresley for the steep grades of the West Highland Line. It was renumbered 1994 in the LNER's 1946 renumbering scheme, and then renumbered 61994 by British railways after the 1948 nationalisation of Britain's railways.

== Overview ==
The North British Railway (NBR) West Highland line to Mallaig via Fort William presented many operating problems due to its steep gradients and severe curves, combined with very restrictive axle loading limits. At grouping in 1923, passenger services were being hauled by D34 'Glen' 4-4-0s due to the axle loading restrictions. Heavier stock had already entered service, and was already resulting in some double-heading of the D34s. An early proposal was to use the new K3s to provide extra power, but they would have been restricted from the Mallaig section of the line, and was vetoed completely by the Civil Engineer after K3 bridge tests were made.

Construction of the K4s began in 1937, and only 6 members of the class were built; 3442 was the second member of the class to be built. Named The Great Marquess in August 1938, after James Graham, 1st Marquess of Montrose, 3442 was mainly used on the Glasgow to Fort William stretch of the West Highland line. The K4s handled the gradients and continuous curves with ease, but they were not designed for the 20 miles of level track near Glasgow, and the 8.5 miles stretch alongside Loch Eil. Vibration at speed was a problem on these stretches, and the middle big-end would require regular nut tightening. After nationalisation more powerful engines found their way to Fort William and 61994 was moved down to Eastfield where it was to spend most of its BR career.

In 1959, 61994 and the other four members of the K4 class were transferred to Thornton Shed for use on goods trains until October 1961 when withdrawals began. 61994 was the last member of the class to be withdrawn in December 1961.

== Preservation ==
61994 was bought from British Railways by Viscount Garnock and so began its long career in preservation. 61994 has had many mainline careers in preservation and has also been allocated to a number of heritage railways including the Severn Valley Railway, East Lancashire Railway, North Yorkshire Moors Railway and even at one point the Keighley & Worth Valley Railway, but it has also even travelled on routes she would never have gone in steam days including "The Settle and Carlisle line", Conwy Valley Line, North Wales Coast Line and even the West Coast and East Coast Main Lines. During its many mainline careers as well as returning to old haunts in Scotland on the West Highland Line it has also visited a number of places in preservation that the class would never have visited in steam days including Carlisle, Worcester, Barrow Hill, Blaenau Ffestiniog and many others.

Currently owned by John Cameron who also owns LNER A4 Pacific no 60009 Union of South Africa, both engines are usually based at Thornton, but recently both have seen major action around the North West of England allocated to Crewe hauling charter trains.

61994 was stored at the North Yorkshire Moors Railway after the expiry of its boiler certificate, but departed for Bo'ness on 21 September 2017, where from December it was displayed in the Museum of Scottish Railways. It is now placed in a museum in Fife, Scotland, built by and dedicated to its current owner, John Cameron, along with his other engine, LNER A4 Pacific no 60009 Union of South Africa.

== Gallery ==
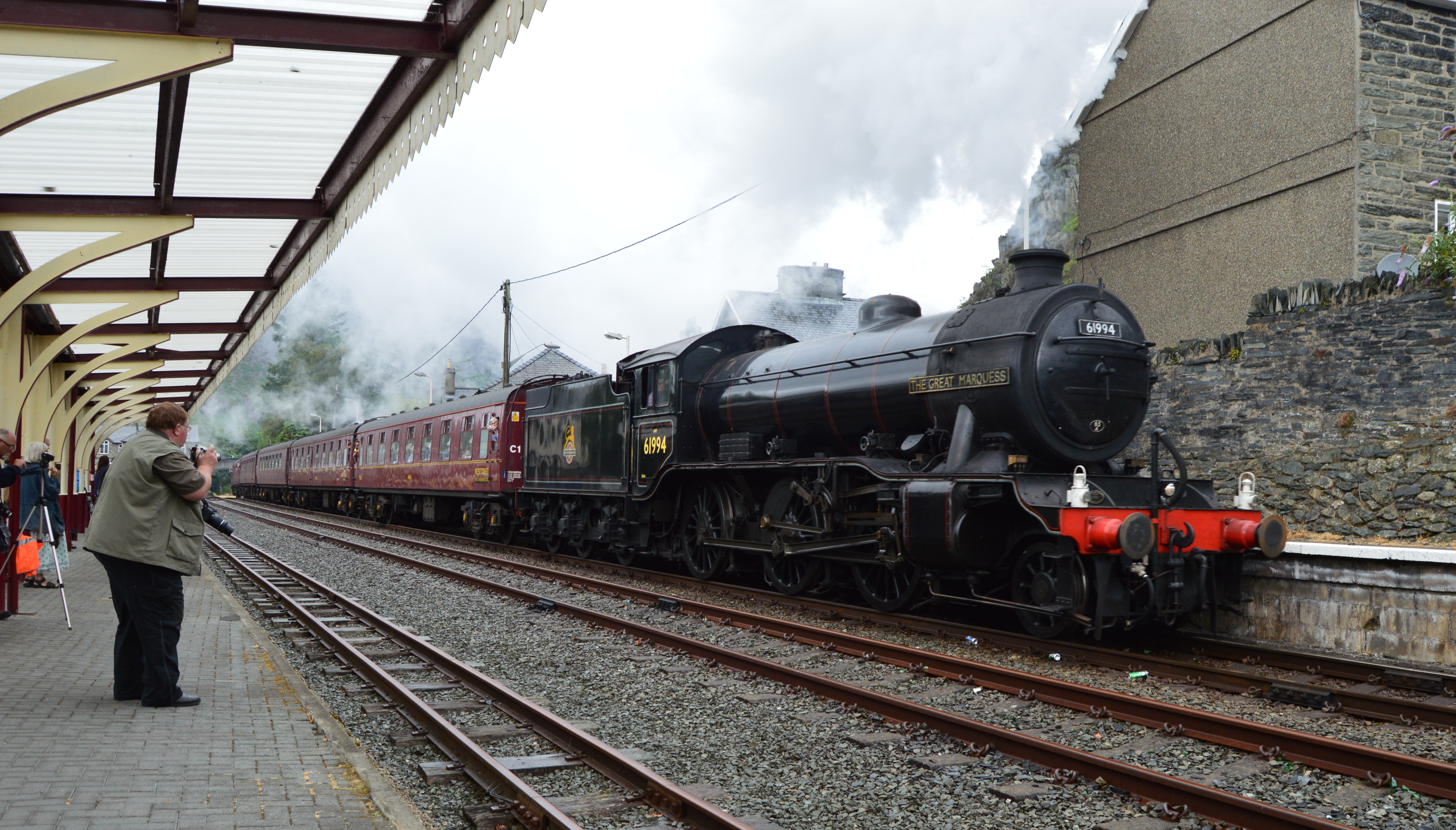
61994 Arriving into Blaenau Ffestiniog with "The Welsh Mountaineer" in Jul 2014

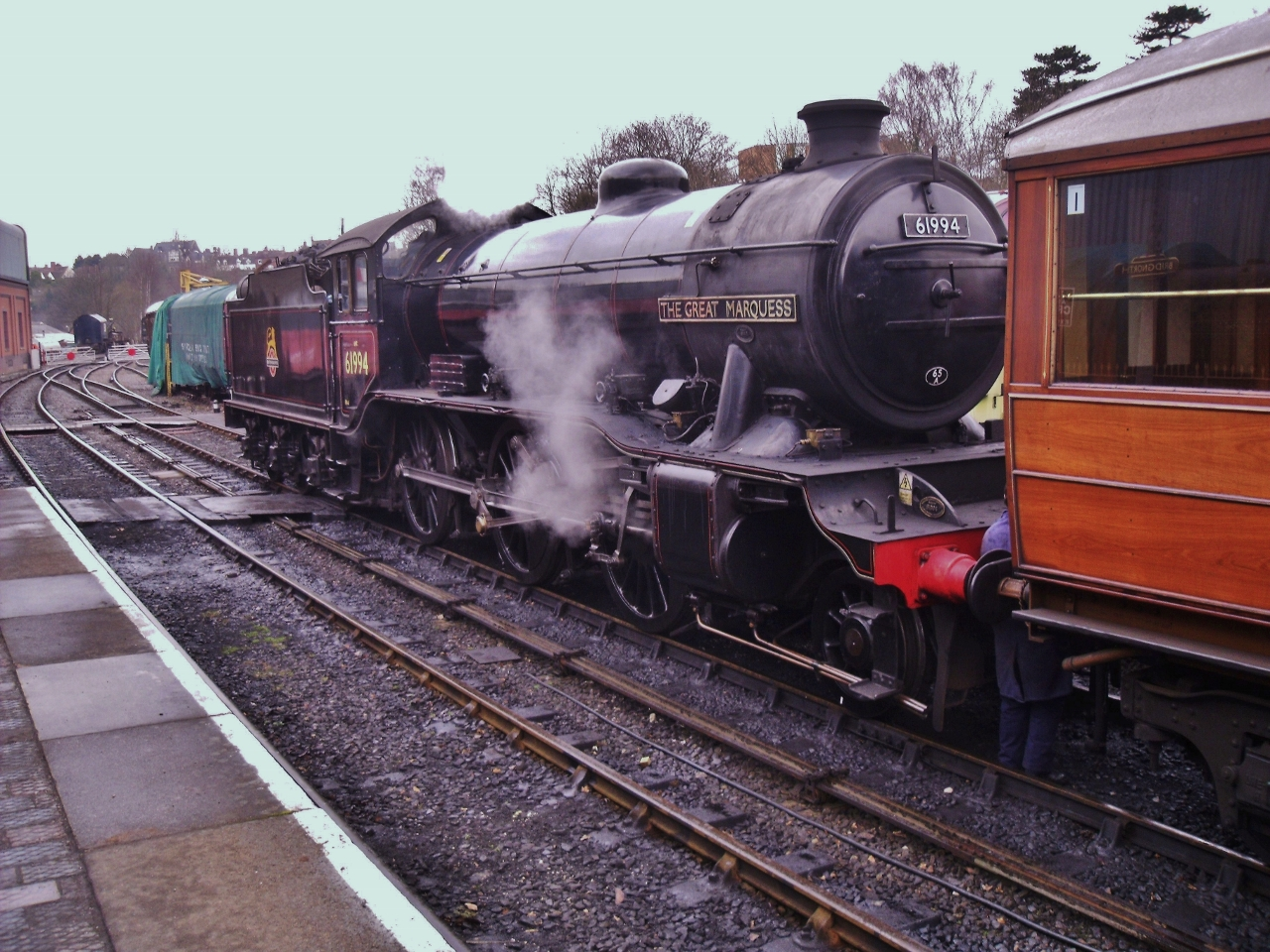
61994 At Bridgnorth on the Severn Valley Railway

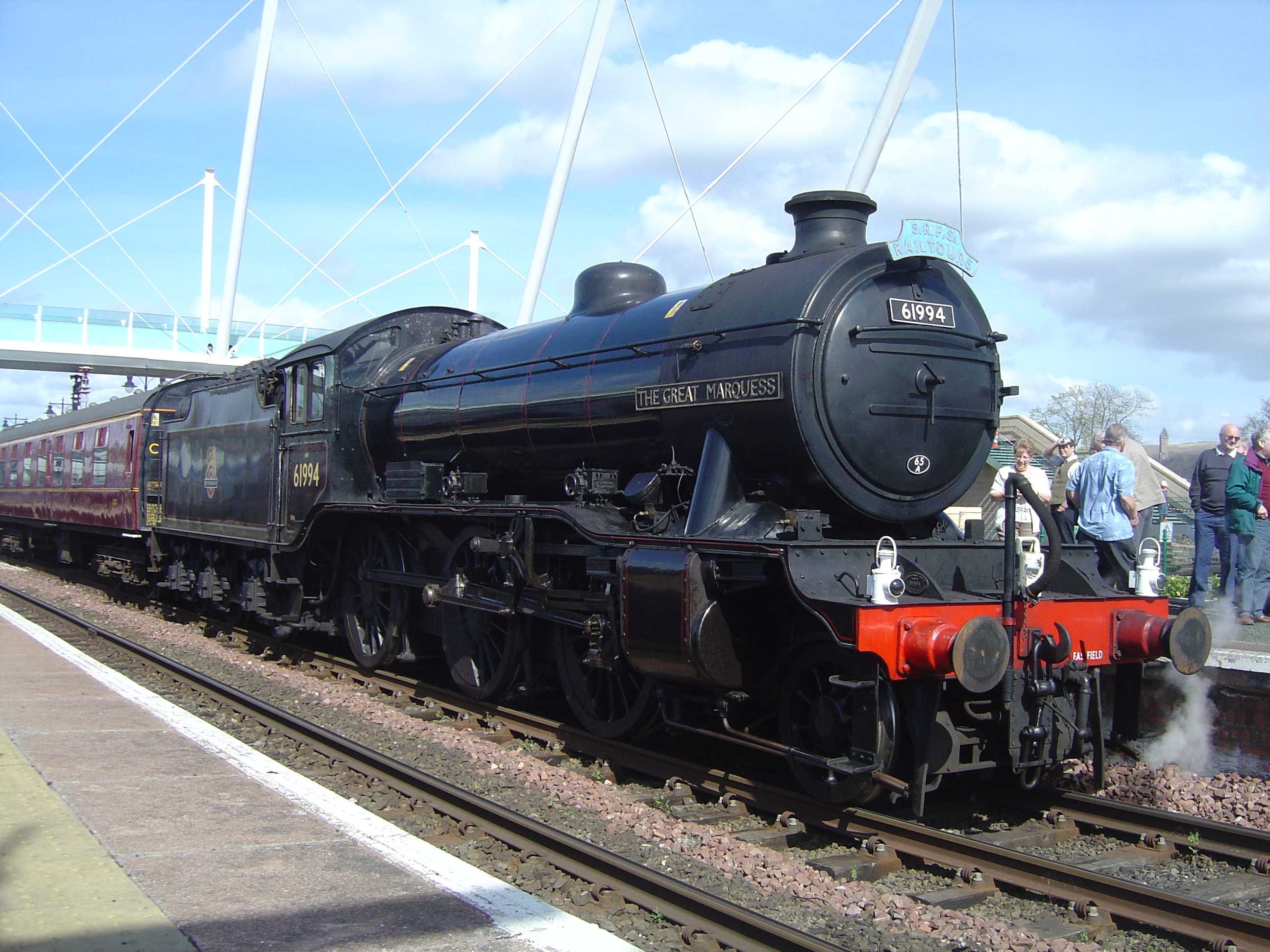
61994 at Stirling

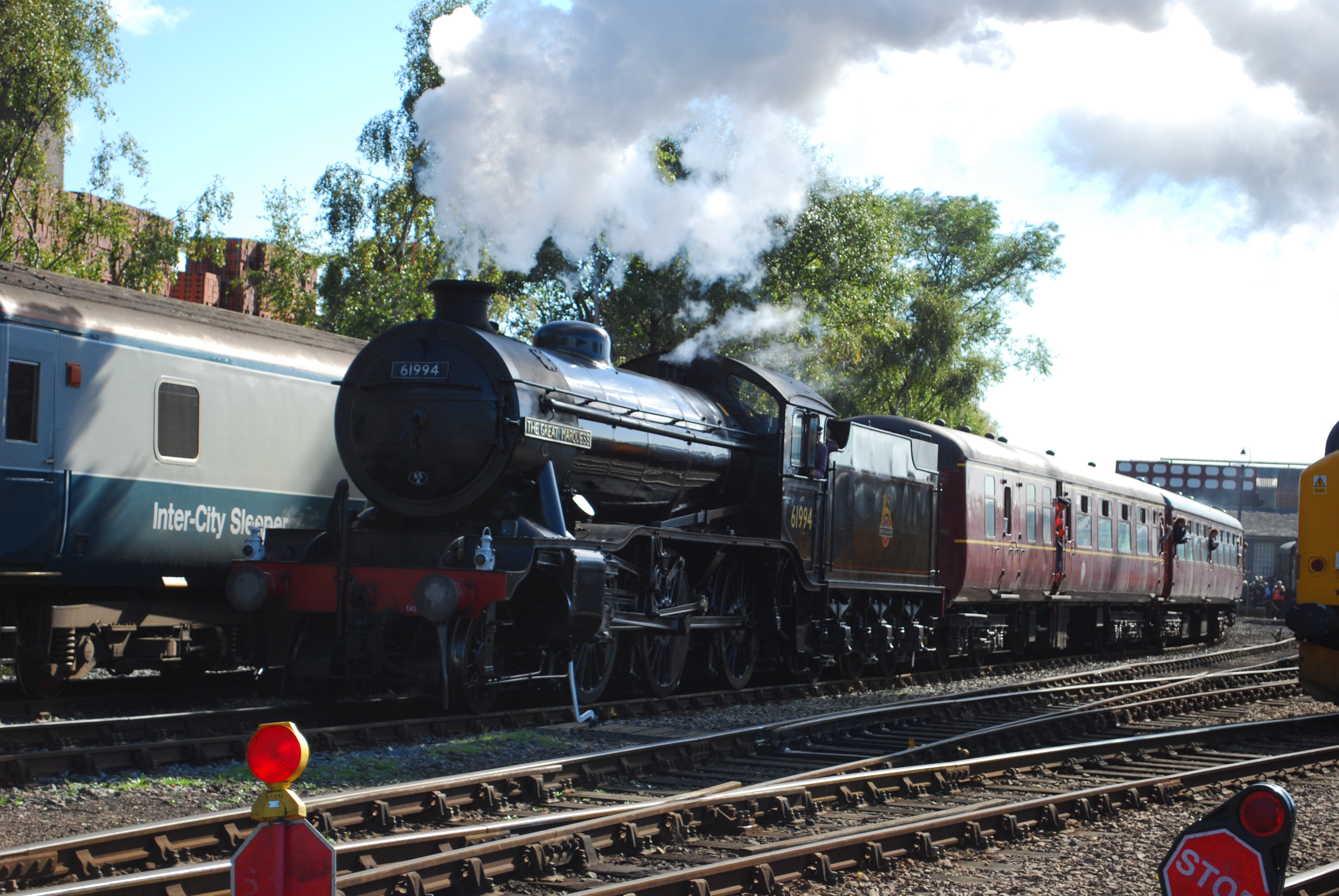
The K4 hauling a passenger train down the demonstration line at Barrow Hill Roundhouse
