= GNR Class H4 =

British steam locomotive class (1920–1962)

GNR Class H4 LNER Class K3
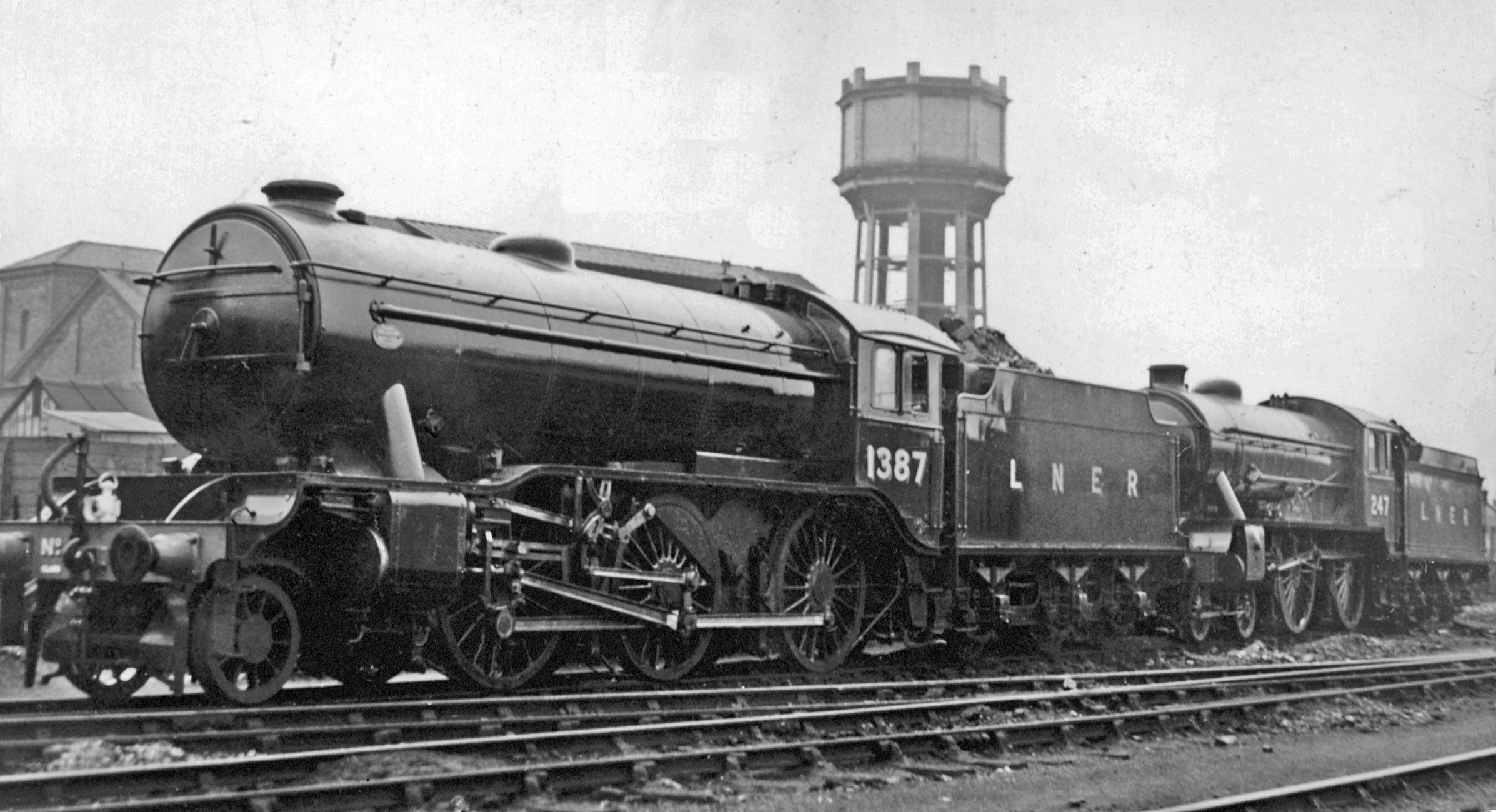
- K3 2-6-0 No. 1387 at York 1939
Type and origin
- Power type: Steam
- Designer: Nigel Gresley
- Builder: Doncaster Works (30); Darlington Works (93); Armstrong Whitworth (40); Robert Stephenson & Co. (10); North British Locomotive Co. (20)
- Build date: 1920–1937
- Total produced: 193
Specifications
- Configuration
  - Whyte: 2-6-0
- Gauge: 4 ft 8 1/2 in (1,435 mm) standard gauge
- Driver dia.: 5 ft 8 in (1.727 m)
- Loco weight: 72.6 long tons (73.8 t; 81.3 short tons)
- Fuel type: Coal
- Boiler pressure: 180 psi (1.24 MPa)
- Cylinders: Three
- Cylinder size: 18.5 in × 26 in (470 mm × 660 mm)
- Valve gear: Outside: Walschaerts; Inside: Gresley conjugated
Performance figures
- Tractive effort: 30,030 lbf (133.6 kN)
Career
- Operators: Great Northern Railway, London and North Eastern Railway, British Railways
- Class: GNR: H4; LNER: K3
- Power class: BR: 5P6F
- Numbers: LNER: 1800–1992; BR: 61800–61992
- Nicknames: Jazzers
- Withdrawn: 1959–1962
- Disposition: All scrapped

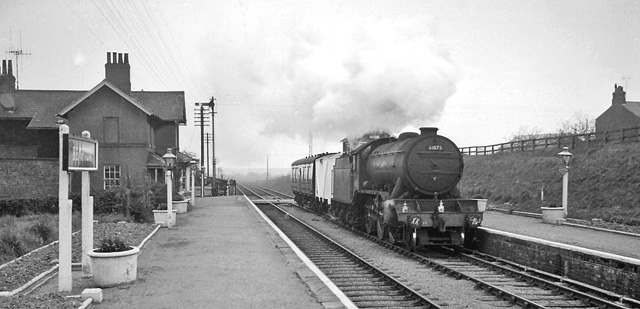
A Gresley K3 class 2-6-0 passes Bempton railway station on a short Class C (Fish) train.

The Great Northern Railway Class H4 (classified K3 by the LNER) was a class of 2-6-0 steam locomotive designed for mixed-traffic work.

The type was a more powerful development of the earlier H3 (LNER K2) class and was notable at the time, as the 6-foot-diameter (1.8 m) boilers were the largest fitted to any British locomotive to that date. After formation of the London and North Eastern Railway, the type became known as class K3 and was adopted as an LNER standard design. They got the nickname "Jazzers" after the rhythm of their exhaust beat and the unbalanced gyratory movement.

== Construction ==
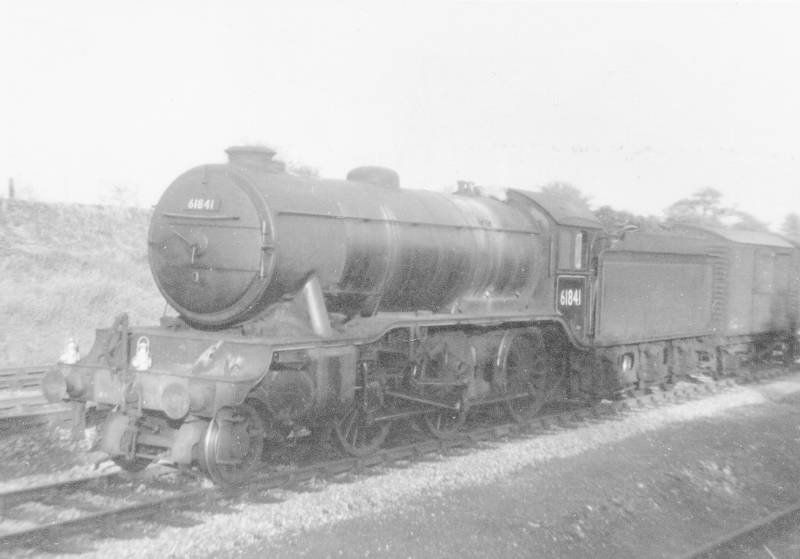
61841 approaching Hucknall Central 1958

The first ten locomotives were built at the GNR's Doncaster Works in 1920, to the design of Nigel Gresley. Six further batches were built at Doncaster and Darlington Works, Armstrong Whitworth, Robert Stephenson and Company and the North British Locomotive Company. The last few of 193 examples were delivered in 1937.

== Use ==
They performed very well as mixed-traffic locomotives, although their large size restricted their route availability. The railway writer O. S. Nock described a journey on the footplate of a Mogul hauling a heavy express goods train in 1942. In their latter years they were primarily employed on vacuum-fitted freight traffic.

== Accidents and incidents ==
- On 15 June 1936, locomotive No. 4009 was hauling an express passenger train which was in a rear-end collision at Welwyn Garden City, Hertfordshire due to a signalman's error. Fourteen people were killed and 29 were injured.
- In July 1936, locomotive No. 2764 was involved in a serious accident at Postland, Lincolnshire.
- On 8 March 1937, locomotive No. 126 was hauling a passenger train that was derailed at Langrick, Lincolnshire due to the condition of the track.
- On 25 August 1956, locomotive No. 61846 was hauling an empty stock train which ran away and crashed through the buffers at Filey Holiday Camp station, Yorkshire. The accident was due to the failure to connect the brake pipe between the train and locomotive.

== Class K5 ==
In 1945, Edward Thompson rebuilt K3 No. 206 into an experimental, two-cylinder LNER Class K5. No more were rebuilt, although some later received K5-type boilers.

== Numbering ==
The original ten locomotives were numbered 1000–1009 by the GNR, and became LNER 4000–4009. Those built for the LNER were numbered haphazardly, filling in gaps in the LNER's numbering scheme. In the LNER's 1946 renumbering programme, the K3s and K5 were renumbered 1800–1992, and they later became British Railways 61800–61992.

== Withdrawal ==
All were withdrawn and scrapped between 1959 and 1962 while the K5 was scrapped in 1960. Three were kept as stationary boilers until 1965.

== Possible new-build ==
It was announced in September 2018 that a new K3 was planned once the LNER Class V4 No. 3403 and LNER Class V3 projects are completed. The engine's number has not yet been confirmed, but is expected to be a replica since 61993 was allocated to an LNER Class K4 locomotive.
