= LNER Class K5 =

British steam locomotive

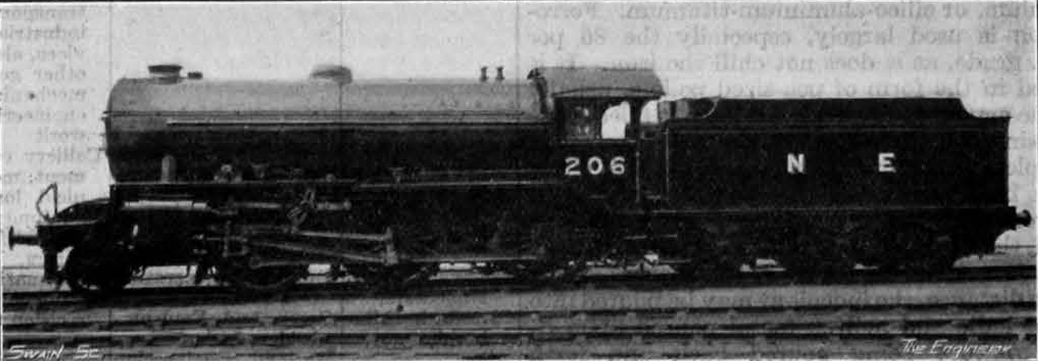
Type and origin
- Power type: Steam
- Designer: Edward Thompson
- Build date: (rebuilt) 1945
Specifications
- Configuration
  - Whyte: 2-6-0
- Gauge: 4 ft 8 1/2 in (1,435 mm)
- Driver dia.: 5 ft 8 in (1.73 m)
- Loco weight: 71.25 long tons (72.39 t)
- Fuel type: Coal
- Boiler pressure: 225 psi (1.55 MPa)
- Cylinders: Two, outside
- Cylinder size: 20 in × 26 in (510 mm × 660 mm)
Performance figures
- Tractive effort: 29,250 lbf (130.1 kN)
Career
- Power class: BR: 6MT

The London and North Eastern Railway Class K5 consisted of a single rebuild of LNER Class K3 2-6-0 No. 206 (later No. 61863), rebuilt in 1945 by Edward Thompson. The rebuilt locomotive had a new boiler and two cylinders instead of three, following earlier rebuilds of other Gresley designs. The aim of rebuilding was to achieve high tractive effort by raising boiler pressures and using two large cylinders for ease of maintenance, as well as greater availability. The K5 was withdrawn and scrapped in 1960.

== Sources ==
- Ian Allan ABC of British Railways Locomotives, part 4 (1948 ed.). p. 17.
