= John Cameron (farmer) =

Scottish farmer and railway executive

John Bell Cameron CBE FRAgS is a Scottish farmer based in Balbuthie, Fife, with significant interest in railways.

== Farming ==
Widely credited as the one-time largest sheep farmer in Europe, Cameron owned seven farms in Fife and West Perthshire. He sold the five farms in Fife, covering 37,000 acres (150 km^{2}), in 2006 to the Edinmore Group, a subsidiary of Caledonian Investments, while still retaining two farms in West Perthshire at Glen Lochay and Ivermearan.

Cameron is president of both the Scottish region of the National Beef Association and the National Sheep Association, and chairs the quality standards committee of Quality Meat Scotland. A former President of the National Farmers Union of Scotland, Cameron is a Fellow of the Royal Agricultural Society, and was appointed a CBE for his work in Scottish farming in the 1982 Birthday Honours.

From 2006 onwards, convicted fraudster John McGregor Cameron defrauded a finance company, who agreed to advance him a loan of up to £800,000 on Cameron's Balbuthie Farm, which was falsely claimed to be towards funding a hotel and golf course scheme. To enable his fraud, John McGregor Cameron drove around the area dressed in tweed driving a Daimler car, in an attempt to make the finance company think that he was John Bell Cameron.

After Cameron discovered the mortgage on his property, a formal investigation was launched. The mortgage was discharged, and court cases pursued against John McGregor Cameron and other parties. John McGregor Cameron was jailed for four years in November 2010 after admitting obtaining money by deception and making a false representation. In 2014 the court made an order against a law firm he had used, to refund £100,000 to the finance company.

== Railways ==
Cameron was the Chairman of ScotRail and a member of the British Railways Board from 1990 to 1996. Between 1967 and 1992 he was the owner/operator of the Lochty Private Railway. A non-executive director of Stagecoach Group, and formerly a director of both South West Trains and the Island Line; as well as a Member of the Safety Review Group. He is also the President of the Gresley Society. In May 2005, South West Trains named its Class 121 driver training railcar John Cameron.

With driver and fireman experience, Cameron has a personal interest in steam railways, and owns two former London & North Eastern Railway locomotives:

- LNER Class A4 - 60009 Union of South Africa
- LNER Class K4 - 3442 The Great Marquess

Cameron had announced that all his railway engines would be permanently withdrawn in 2019 and placed in a museum he was planning to build on his farm. Later, because of that locomotive's good condition, he decided that A4 Union of South Africa would continue running through until January 2022 on the East Lancashire Railway; in October 2021, cracks were discovered in the boiler and it was decided not to attempt repairs.

== Personal life ==
Married to South African-born Margaret, the couple live at the 400-acre (1.6 km^{2}) Balbuthie Farm in St Monans, Fife and maintain a cottage in Africa on the shores of Lake Malawi.

In 2007, Cameron and his wife set up the Cameron Travel Scholarship Trust, to allow both Scottish agricultural students and those studying at the Dollar Academy in Dollar, Clackmannanshire, to "travel abroad for the purpose of broadening their education and understanding of the world." He was Chairman of the Board of Governors of the school, where he himself was educated, until relinquishing office in 2014.
