= GNR Class H3 =

Class of 65+10 British 2-6-0 locomotives

GNR Class H2 and H3 LNER Class K1 and K2
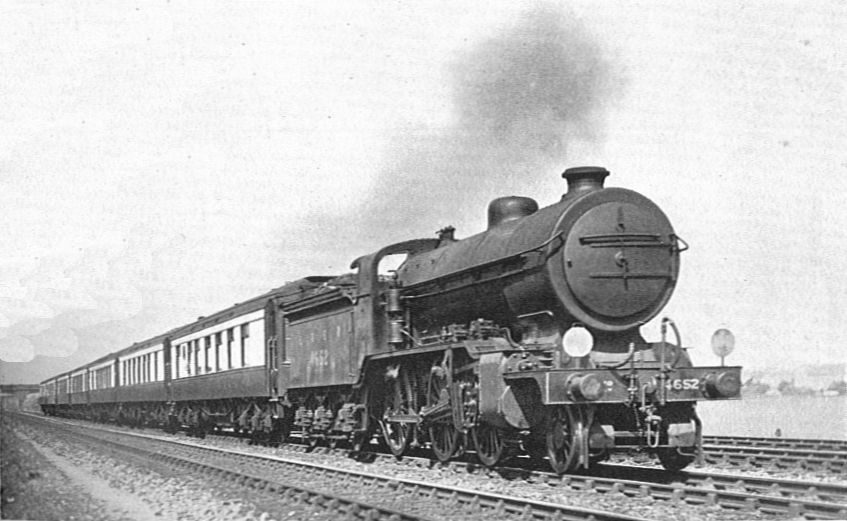
- LNER K2 4652 pulling Pullman coaches
Type and origin
- Power type: Steam
- Designer: Nigel Gresley
- Builder: Doncaster Works (10+20); North British Locomotive Co. (20); Kitson and Company (25)
- Serial number: Doncaster: 1354, 1372–1380, 1425–1426, 1428–1435, 1466–1475; NBL: 21971–21990; Kitsons: 5330–5354
- Build date: 1912–21
- Total produced: K1: 10; K2: 10 rebuilt + 65 new
- Rebuild date: 1920–1921, 1931–1937
- Number rebuilt: 10
Specifications
- Configuration
  - Whyte: 2-6-0
- Gauge: 4 ft 8 1/2 in (1,435 mm) standard gauge
- Leading dia.: 3 ft 2 in (0.965 m)
- Driver dia.: 5 ft 8 in (1.727 m)
- Loco weight: K1: 61.7 long tons (62.7 t; 69.1 short tons); K2: 64.4 long tons (65.4 t; 72.1 short tons)
- Fuel type: Coal
- Firebox
  - Grate area: K1: 24.5 sq ft (2.28 m^{2}); K2: 24 sq ft (2.2 m^{2})
- Boiler pressure: 180 psi (1.24 MPa)
- Cylinders: Two
- Cylinder size: 20 in × 26 in (508 mm × 660 mm)
Performance figures
- Tractive effort: 23,400 lbf (104.1 kN)
Career
- Operators: Great Northern Railway, London and North Eastern Railway, British Railways
- Class: GNR: H2 and H3; LNER: K1 and K2
- Numbers: GNR: 1630–1704; LNER (1923): 4630-4704; LNER (1946): 1720–1794; BR: 61720–61794
- Nicknames: Ragtimers
- Withdrawn: 1955–1962
- Disposition: All scrapped

The Great Northern Railway Class H2 and H3 (classified K1 and K2 by the LNER) was a class of 2-6-0 steam locomotive designed for mixed-traffic work.

The class was created as a locomotive which could haul heavier goods trains at speeds of up to 40 mph. The class were later developed into the more powerful H4 (LNER K3) class. After formation of the London and North Eastern Railway, the type became known as class K1 and K2 and was adopted as an LNER standard design. They got the nickname "Ragtimers" because of their lively nature when running at speed and their use of Walschaerts valve gear which was uncommon on the GNR at the time.

== Construction ==
The ten K1s were built at the GNR's Doncaster Works in 1912–1913, to the design of Nigel Gresley. Five batches of K2s, also to the design of Gresley, were built at Doncaster, the North British Locomotive Company, and Kitson and Company between 1914 and 1921. These were the first design to incorporate Gresley's patented double swing link pony truck design.

== Use ==
They were excellent mixed-traffic locomotives, but began to be displaced by the larger and stronger K3s. They were moved to former the Great Eastern and North British lines to supplement existing engines. Twenty K2s were fitted with Westinghouse pumps so they could pull passenger trains from Liverpool Street on the Colchester and Cambridge lines.

== Rebuilding ==
No. 4635 was rebuilt from K1 to K2 in 1920. No. 4631 was rebuilt in 1921. No further K1s were rebuilt until 1931, when a shortage of K1 boilers necessitated rebuilds. The remaining eight were rebuilt between 1931 and 1937, making the K1 class extinct.

== Numbering ==
The K1s were numbered 1630–1639 by the GNR, and became LNER 4630-4639. The K2s were numbered 1640–1704 by the GNR, and became LNER 4640-4704. In the LNER's 1946 renumbering programme, the K2s were renumbered 1720–1794, and they later became British Railways 61720–61794.

== Names ==
None of the K1s were named. However, some of the K2s based in Scotland received names in 1933–34.

Number			Name
LNER	LNER 1946	BR	Name
4674	1764	61764	Loch Arkaig
4682	1772	61772	Loch Lochy
4684	1774	61774	Loch Garry
4685	1775	61775	Loch Treig
4691	1781	61781	Loch Morar
4692	1782	61782	Loch Eil
4693	1783	61783	Loch Sheil [sic]
4697	1787	61787	Loch Quoich
4698	1788	61788	Loch Rannoch
4699	1789	61789	Loch Laidon
4700	1790	61790	Loch Lomond
4701	1791	61791	Loch Laggan
4704	1794	61794	Loch Oich

== Withdrawal ==
All K2s were withdrawn and scrapped between 1955 and 1962.
