= LNER Class A4 4488 Union of South Africa =

LNER Class A4 steam locomotive built in Doncaster in 1937

Union of South Africa
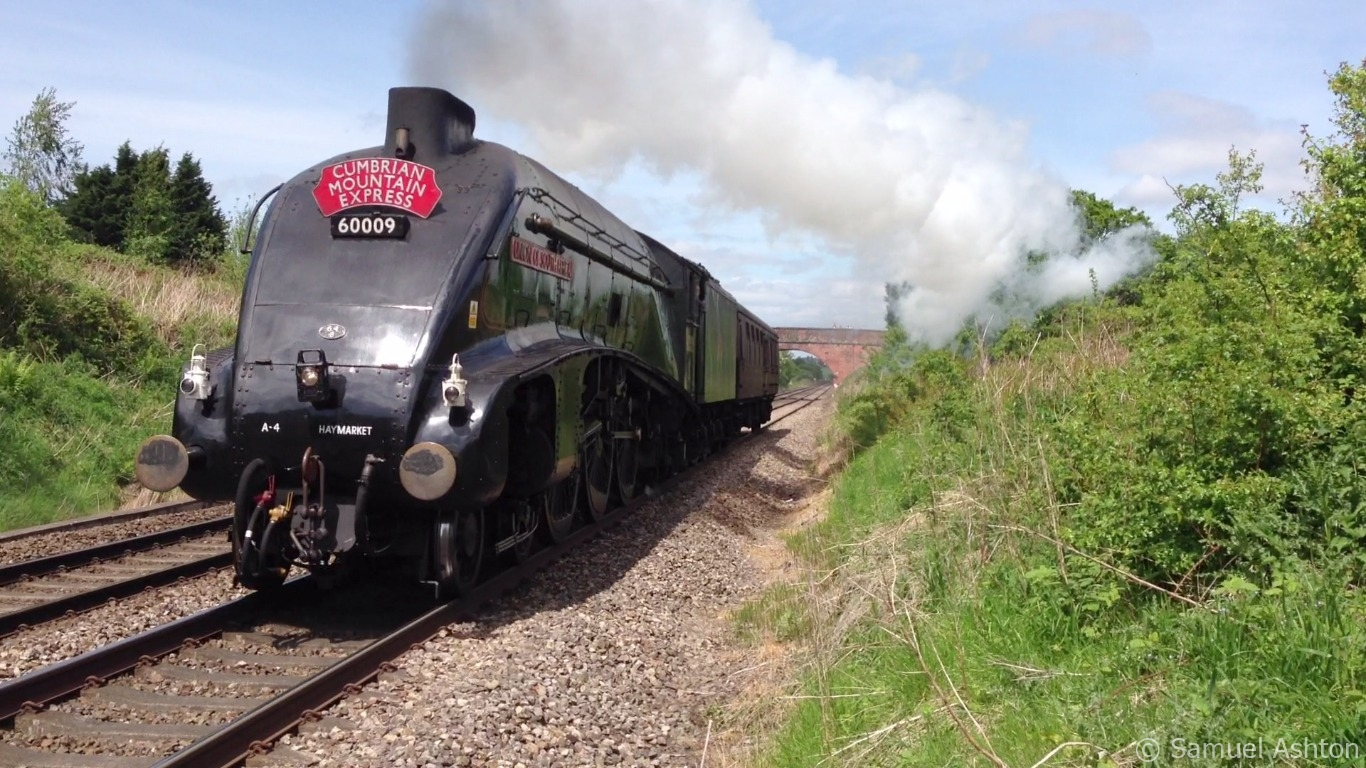
- Union of South Africa passes Condover
Type and origin
- Power type: Steam
- Designer: Nigel Gresley
- Builder: Doncaster Works
- Serial number: 1853
- Build date: 16 April 1937
Specifications
- Configuration
  - Whyte: 4-6-2
  - UIC: 2'C1h3
- Gauge: 4 ft 8 1/2 in (1,435 mm)
- Leading dia.: 3 ft 2 in (0.965 m)
- Driver dia.: 6 ft 8 in (2.032 m)
- Trailing dia.: 3 ft 8 in (1.118 m)
- Boiler pressure: 250 psi (1.72 MPa)
- Cylinders: Three
- Cylinder size: 18.5 in × 26 in (470 mm × 660 mm)
- Loco brake: Vacuum
- Train brakes: LNER/BR: Vacuum
Performance figures
- Tractive effort: 35,455 lbf (157.7 kN)
Career
- Operators: LNER, BR
- Class: A4
- Number in class: 15 of 35
- Numbers: LNER: 4488, LNER: 9, BR: 60009
- Official name: Union of South Africa
- Withdrawn: 1 June 1966
- Restored: 1989
- Current owner: John Cameron
- Disposition: Static display at John Cameron's Farming and Railway Visitor Centre

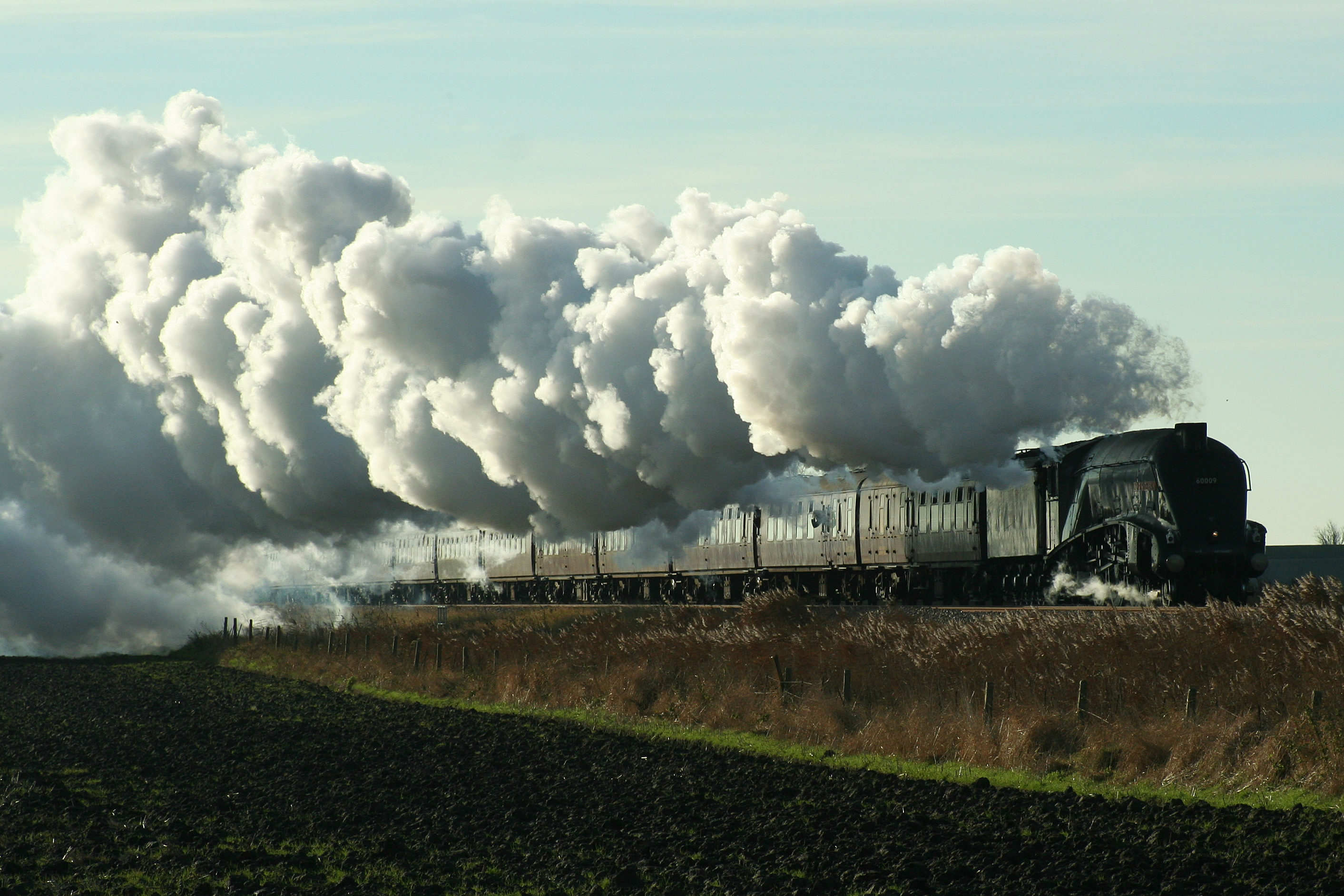
Union of South Africa pulls 2012 excursion train near Deeping St Nicholas.

60009 Union of South Africa is a LNER Class A4 steam locomotive built at Doncaster Works on 16 April 1937. It is one of six surviving A4s. Its mainline certification expired in April 2020. As the locomotive is subject to a boiler inspection, it was moved to the East Lancashire Railway as the original plan was to keep it running there until the end of boiler certificate and then send it somewhere else for static display, but a cracked boiler tube forced it into retirement prematurely. It was briefly renamed Osprey during part of the 1980s and 1990s due to political opposition against apartheid in South Africa at the time.

== Names ==
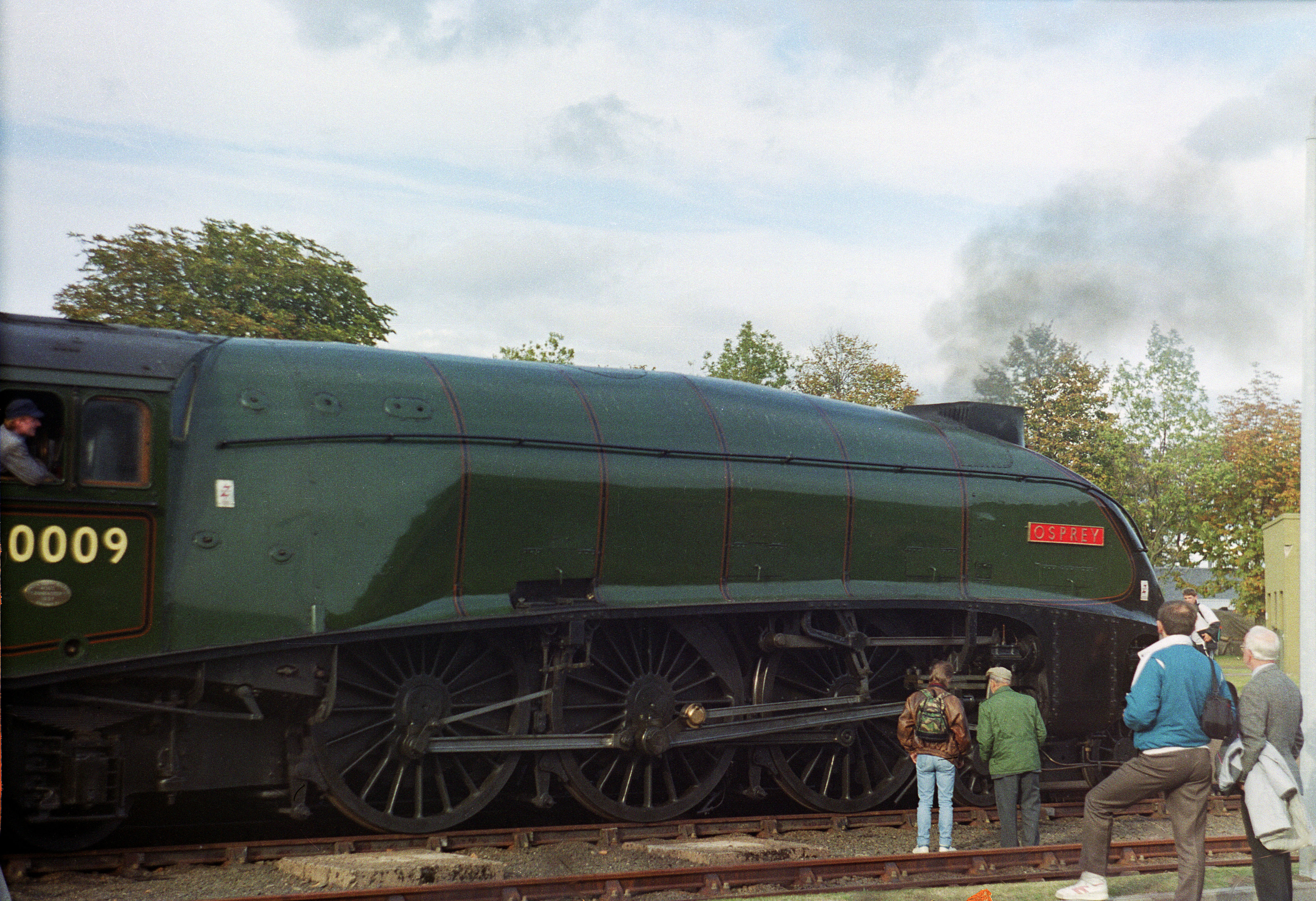
Osprey (Union of South Africa) at the 1990 Leuchars Air Show

Built by the London and North Eastern Railway (LNER) in 1937 at Doncaster Works and originally numbered 4488, it was named after the Union of South Africa. It had previously been allocated the name Osprey and painted in LNER Apple Green livery on 17 April 1937, but was renamed and repainted into LNER Garter Blue to operate The Coronation. It eventually carried the name Osprey in the 1980s and 1990s. This was due to the contemporary political opposition against South Africa, which undertook a controversial policy of racial apartheid from 1948 to 1994. The name Osprey had previously been carried by A4 No. 4494 (renamed after the LNER director Andrew K. McCosh after 1942) and LNER Peppercorn Class A1 No. 60131 from 1949 to 1965. 60009's name has since reverted to Union of South Africa. The works number was 1853; the plaques are located in the cab itself and not on the exterior cab sides as is the usual practice.

== Plaque ==
The springbok plaque on the side of the locomotive was donated on 12 April 1954 by a Bloemfontein newspaper proprietor. Only the one plaque was fitted on the left hand side of the locomotive. Two cast Springbok plaques were given to John Cameron in the mid-1970s and these were mounted on the cabsides. They have since been removed during overhauls but the original boiler side plaque remains. 60009 is fitted with an American, Crosby chime whistle in common with other members of its class.

== Liveries ==
Union of South Africa has worn many liveries throughout its career. The first livery it wore was as 4488 in garter blue, applied on 19 April 1937. The next livery applied was LNER wartime black on 21 March 1942. This livery was amended on 14 August 1943 when the "L" and "R" were removed to confuse potential spies, leaving the all-black locomotive with just "NE" on the tender. 21 February 1947 saw Union of South Africa regain garter blue with red and white lining. Its number was changed to just "9" on 12 January 1946, under the renumbering scheme of Nigel Gresley's successor, Edward Thompson. It gained a stainless steel number 9 during this repaint. On 4 August 1949, 60009 was repainted in the standard British Railways express passenger blue livery as 60007 Sir Nigel Gresley. Finally on 2 October 1952, Union of South Africa was painted in British Railways green livery. It has worn this livery throughout preservation to date.

== Technical details ==
As with all 35 of the Gresley A4 pacific steam locomotives, Union of South Africa was fitted with streamlined valances, or side skirting, when it was built. This was found to hinder maintenance and, as with the rest of the class, it was removed. 4488 lost its valances during a works visit 21 March 1942.

=== Boilers ===
60009 has been fitted with 14 boilers during its career: 8951, 9129 (a new-build boiler fitted 9 November 1940), 8955 (from 4492 Dominion of New Zealand, 13 January 1945), 9128 (from 2512 Silver Fox, 9 February 1946), 8957 (from 4490 Empire of India, 5 May 1948), 9027 (from 60028 Walter K Whigham, 4 August 1949 – this boiler was renumbered 29279 on 23 November 1950), 29285 (from 60032 Gannet, 22 April 1954), 29278 (from 60013 Dominion of New Zealand, 18 November 1958), 27965 (a new-build boiler, 17 February 1960), 27961 (from 60024 Kingfisher, 19 July 1961) and 29337 (from 60023 Golden Eagle, 6 November 1963).

=== Tenders ===
60009 has had five tenders through its career, of two differing types. The first tender it had was a 1928 pattern streamlined corridor tender. This was a rebuild of a tender fitted to a Class A1 or A3 beforehand, being streamlined and fitted to 4488 from new. This was later changed for a new-build streamlined corridor tender from 1948 – 1963. After its withdrawal, 60009 donated its tender for conversion to a second, water carrying only tender for 4472 Flying Scotsman. Currently 60009 is fitted with a 1928 pattern streamlined corridor tender, allowing its cab crew to be changed whilst the locomotive is hauling passenger trains. This tender was originally fitted to the LNER's experimental high-pressure Nº 10000. The tenders it has had were: 5325 (17 April 1937 – 22 March 1948), 5636 (5 May 1948 – 14 May 1948), 5591 (14 May 1948 – 16 July 1963), 5332 (6 November 1963 – 1 June 1966) and 5484 (17 July 1966 – 10 September 1966).

60009 had a double chimney fitted on 18 November 1958. This feature was first fitted to 4468 Mallard back in 1938. As the safety requirements were tightened after the Harrow and Wealdstone rail crash, Automatic Warning Systems was fitted to all locomotives. 60009 was so fitted on 17 February 1960. At the same time this was done, a Stone-Smith type speed recorder was also fitted.

== Career ==
Union of South Africa was allocated to Haymarket shed in Edinburgh from new and 20 May 1962 it had its only shed transfer to Aberdeen.

On 24 October 1964 it hauled the last booked steam-hauled train from London King's Cross. It was twenty minutes late through Grantham owing to a broken rail at High Dyke. It was the last steam locomotive to be overhauled at Doncaster whilst in service in November 1963. It was withdrawn from British Railways service on 1 June 1966.

== Preservation ==
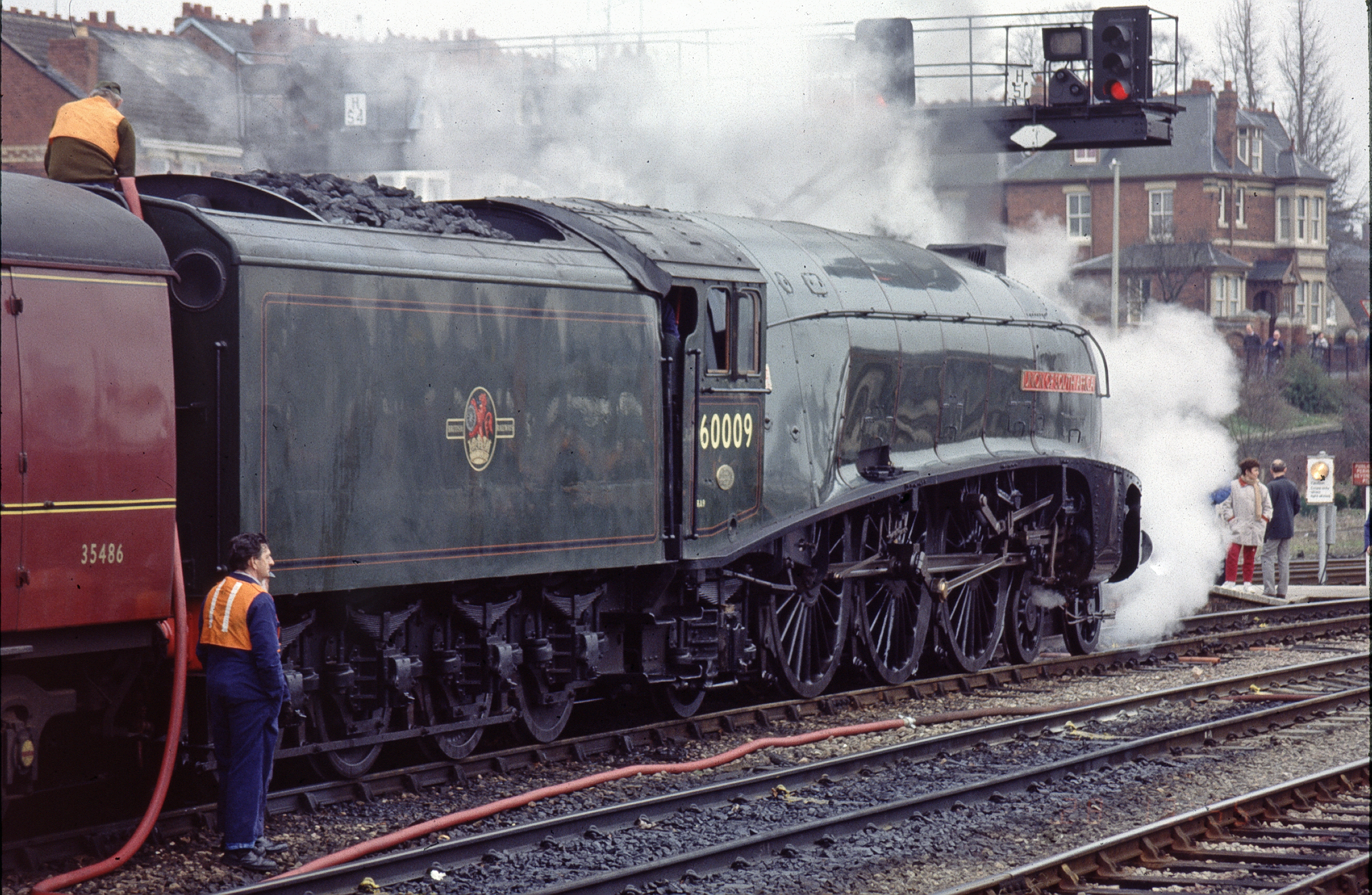
1980s photo

Purchased by John Cameron in July 1966, 60009 was preserved on the now-defunct Lochty Private Railway in Fife, Scotland, travelling the 1.5 miles (2.4 km) of track near Anstruther.

In 1973 the loco left the Lochty Private Railway by road and was taken to Ladybank to be placed back on the National Network. From there it was taken to Kirkcaldy and was based in the former goods shed, from where it worked occasional tours from the Fife town. After a few years at Kirkcaldy it moved to Markinch and took up residency in the former goods shed, where it stayed until May 1994 – with the exception of a couple of years in a shed in the yard at nearby Thornton.

Following the 1989 overhaul it started to work railtours all over the UK. These ranged from Plymouth in the south-west to Inverness in the north, from Holyhead in the west to Norwich in the east. 60009 also visited numerous main line connected preserved railways. It has accumulated the highest mileage of any locomotive in the class.

In May 1994 the locomotive left its Markinch base for the last time, albeit on the back of a low loader bound for the Severn Valley Railway, Bridgnorth for repairs. Its route took it over the Forth Road Bridge and in doing so became the only steam locomotive to cross both the Forth Bridge and the adjacent road bridge.

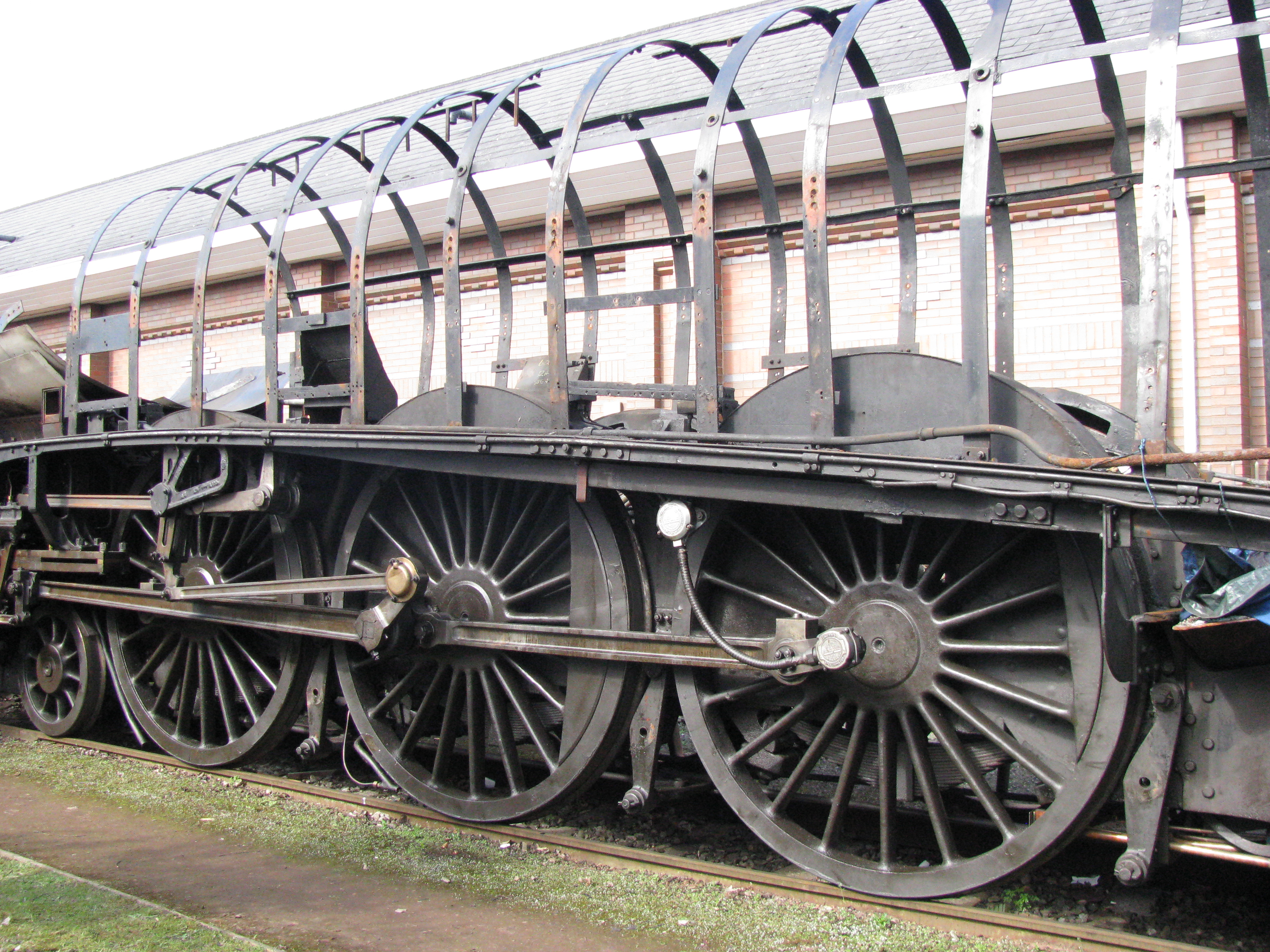
Streamline frame of 60009 on chassis, but with boiler removed, for restoration at Crewe

After a repair in January 2007 it left the Severn Valley Railway and went to Crewe for fitting of on-train monitoring recorder (OTMR) equipment. In April 2007 it returned home to Scotland with the Railway Touring Company's The Great Britain railtour, and hence to its new base at Thornton. Later in 2007 it hauled the regular Scarborough Spa Express from York to Scarborough via Knaresborough, Harrogate and Leeds.

In 2008 continued to work with the Railway Touring Company, pulling trains running between York and Edinburgh on several occasions during the first half of 2008. Union of South Africa appeared at the North Yorkshire Moors Railway LNER Festival 2008, along with 60007 Sir Nigel Gresley and 60019 Bittern, the first time that all three A4s had been together in preservation.

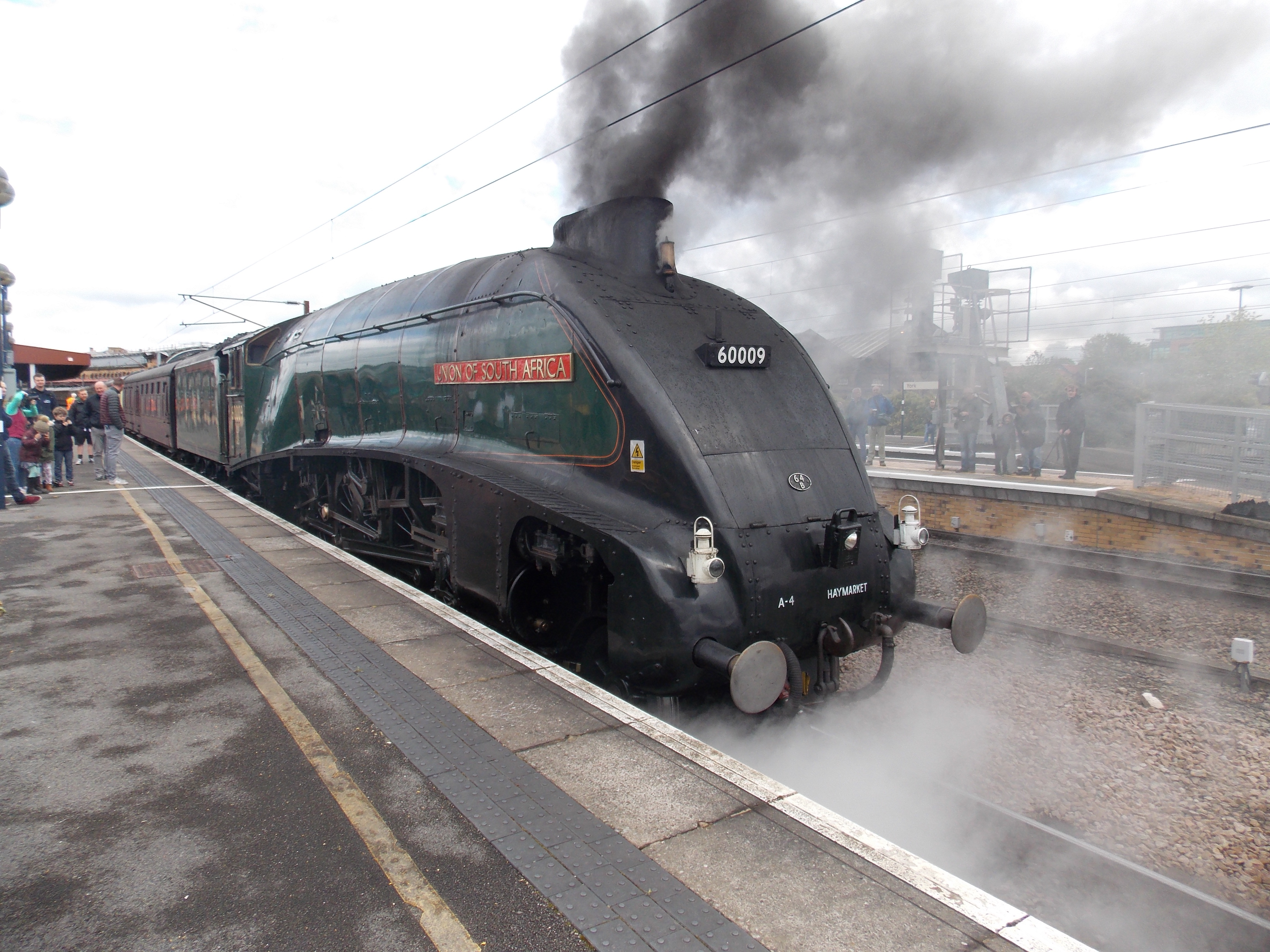
Union of South Africa 60009 seen in excursion service in York (April 2019)

In light of the expiry of its boiler certificate, Union of South Africa arrived at Pete Waterman's LNWR Workshops at Crewe in 2010 to undergo an extensive overhaul. It returned to steam in mid-2012, hauling its first tours for West Coast Railways on 22 and 23 July.

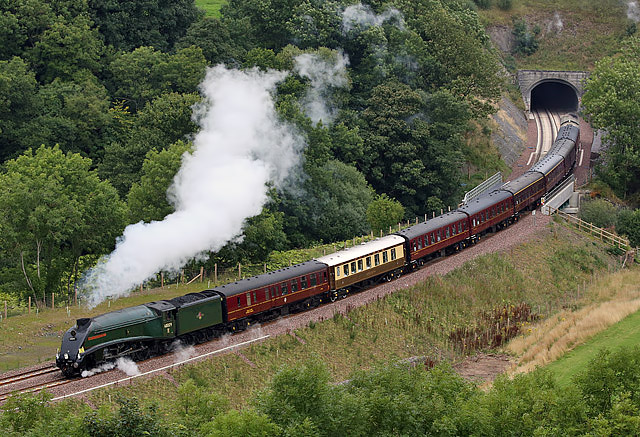
Queen Elizabeth II was carried to Tweedbank aboard a train hauled by no. 60009 Union of South Africa on 9 September 2015, shown here south of Bowshank Tunnel.

On 9 September 2015, 60009 hauled a train carrying Queen Elizabeth II along with Prince Philip, Duke of Edinburgh and Scottish First Minister Nicola Sturgeon to officially re-open the Borders Railway between Edinburgh Waverley and Tweedbank. The locomotive subsequently operated railtours on the line throughout September. In 2017 John Cameron announced that 60009 would be withdrawn when its boiler ticket expires and placed in the Farming and Railway Visitor Centre in Fife. In March 2019 a 12-month extension to the boiler certificate was granted. On 7 March 2020 it hauled its last main line charter – from Ealing Broadway to York via the Midland Main Line – and was then stored at the National Railway Museum. In October 2020 it was hauled from York to the East Lancashire Railway (ELR), where it entered service in April 2021. It was due to remain operational on the ELR until its boiler certificate expire in April 2022. However, a cracked boiler tube was discovered in early October 2021 and it was retired with immediate effect. Its last public trains were on 3 September 2021, when the second loco in steam was fellow Gresley Pacific, A3 class No 60103 'Flying Scotsman'. In May 2022, Union of South Africa was placed on static display at the Bury Transport Museum in Bury, Greater Manchester. As of April 2023, the locomotive has returned to Fife for static display at John Cameron's Farming and Railway Visitor Centre to be opened at his Balbuthie Farm. It will be displayed with his other locomotive, former LNER K4 class 61994 "The Great Marquess".
