= Locomotives of the North Eastern Railway =

The North Eastern Railway was formed by merger in 1854 and merged into the London and North Eastern Railway at the grouping in 1923. Between those dates five men held the post of Locomotive Superintendent.

In addition many locomotives were inherited from the NER's constituents, and also from subsequent acquisitions, which are not listed here.

== Edward Fletcher (1854–1883) ==
Edward Fletcher was inherited from the York, Newcastle and Berwick Railway, one of the NER's constituents. There was very little standardization during his term of office, and only a few types are listed here.

Class	Type	Quantity	Manufacturer	Date	LNER Class	Notes
BTP	0-4-4T	124	Neilson & Co. (12); R. & W. Hawthorn & Co. (20); Gateshead Works; Darlington Works (25); York Works (2)	1874–84	G6	
66	2-2-4T	1	Gateshead Works	1869	X1	
190	2-2-4T	2	York Works	1860, 1881	X3	
290	0-6-0T	(60)		(1899–1921)		Rebuilt from BTP-class 0-4-4T
398	0-6-0	325	R. Stephenson & Co. (80); R. & W. Hawthorn & Co. (30); Neilson & Co. (10); Sharp, Stewart & Co. (20); Dübs & Co. (20); Gateshead Works (105); Darlington Works (51); York Works (3)	1872-1883	—	
708	0-6-0	70	R. Stephenson & Co. R. & W. Hawthorn & Co.	1870-73	—	
901	2-4-0	55	Gateshead Works (35); Beyer, Peacock & Co. (10); Neilson & Co. (10)	1872–82	—	
No. 957	2-2-4T	(1)	Gateshead Works	(1903)	X2	Rebuilt from BTP-class 0-4-4T
1001	0-6-0				—	
1440	2-4-0	18	Leeds Works (1); Gateshead Works (17)	1875–85	—	

== Alexander McDonnell (1883–1884) ==
Alexander McDonnell moved from the Great Southern and Western Railway of Ireland. However his policies proved unpopular with the drivers and he resigned after only one year in office.

Class	Type	Quantity	Manufacturer	Date	LNER Class	Notes
38	4-4-0	28	Gateshead Works (16); R. & W. Hawthorn (12)	1884–85	—	Another 8 cancelled
59	0-6-0	44	Darlington Works (32); R. Stephenson & Co. (12)	1883–85	J22	

== Locomotive Committee (1884–1885) ==
Between A. McDonnell and T. W. Worsdell there was an interval during which the office was covered by a Locomotive Committee. The Locomotive Committee was chaired by Henry Tennant.

Class	Type	Quantity	Manufacturer	Date	LNER Class	Notes
8	0-6-0T	8	Gateshead Works	1885	J74	Incorporated parts of cancelled 38-class locomotives
1463	2-4-0	20	Darlington Works (10); Gateshead Works (10)	1885	E5	

== Thomas William Worsdell (1885–1890) ==
T. W. Worsdell was an enthusiast for compounding and many of his designs used the two-cylinder system of August von Borries, usually in conjunction with simple-expansion versions of the same engines for comparison. The compounds were mostly rebuilt as simple-expansion engines by his brother and successor Wilson Worsdell.

He introduced the system of class designations, starting with "A" for the first, and so on, and then adding a digit for later developments of each. This system was reorganized somewhat in 1914.

Image	Class	Type	Quantity	Manufacturer	Date	LNER Class	Notes
	A	2-4-2T	60	Gateshead Works	1886–92	F8	
	B	0-6-2T	53	Gateshead Works (14); Darlington Works (39)	1888–90	—	Two-cylinder compound, rebuilt as simple 1904–11
	B1	0-6-2T	11	Darlington Works (10); Gateshead Works (1)	1886–88	N8	Redesignated class B in 1914
	C	0-6-0	171	Gateshead Works (141); Darlington Works (30)	1886–92	—	Two-cylinder compound, rebuilt as simple 1901–11
	C1	0-6-0	30	Gateshead Works	1886–95	J21	Simple version of "C", redesignated class C in 1914
	D	2-4-0	2	Gateshead Works	1886–88	—	Two-cylinder compound, rebuilt as 4-4-0 simple in 1896, became class F1, then F
	E	0-6-0T	120	Darlington Works	1886–95	J71	
	F	4-4-0	25	Gateshead Works	1887–91	—	Two-cylinder compound, rebuilt as simple 1895–1905
	F1	4-4-0	10	Gateshead Works	1887	D22	Simple version of "F", redesignated class F in 1914
	G	2-4-0	20	Darlington Works	1887–88	D23	Rebuilt as 4-4-0 in 1900–04, to become class G1, then G
	H	0-4-0T	19	Gateshead Works	1888–97	Y7	Another 5 built by LNER at Darlington Works in 1923
	H1	0-6-0T	2	Gateshead Works	1888	J78	Crane tanks, derived from class "H" 0-4-0s
	I	4-2-2	10	Gateshead Works	1888–90	—	Two-cylinder compound, rebuilt as simple 1900–02, withdrawn 1920–22
	J	4-2-2	10	Gateshead Works	1889–90	—	Larger than class "I", two-cylinder compound, rebuilt as simple 1894–95, withdrawn 1920–22
	K	0-4-0T	5	Gateshead Works	1890	Y8	

== Wilson Worsdell (1890–1910) ==
Wilson Worsdell was the brother of his predecessor.

Image	Class	Type	Quantity	Manufacturer	Date	LNER Class	Notes
	964A	0-6-0T	15		1891–93	—	rebuilds of 964 class
	L	0-6-0T	10	Gateshead Works	1891–92	J73	
	M	4-4-0	1	Gateshead Works	1893	D19	Two-cylinder Worsdell-von Borries compound; rebuilt in 1898 as three-cylinder Smith compound; redesignated class "3CC" in 1914.
	M1	4-4-0	20	Gateshead Works	1892–93	D17/1	"Rail Crushers." Redesignated class "M" in 1914
	N	0-6-2T	20	Darlington Works	1893	N9	
	O	0-4-4T	110	Darlington Works	1894–1901	G5	
	P	0-6-0	70	Gateshead Works (50); Darlington Works (20)	1894–98	J24	
	P1	0-6-0	120	Gateshead Works (80); Darlington Works (40)	1898–1902	J25	
	P2	0-6-0	50	Gateshead Works (20); Darlington Works (30)	1904–05	J26	
	P3	0-6-0	80	Darlington Works (30); Beyer, Peacock & Co. (20); North British Locomotive Co. (20); Robert Stephenson & Co. (10)	1906–09	J27	Another 25 built in 1921–22 (see below)
	Q	4-4-0	30	Gateshead Works	1896–97	D17/2	Similar to class "M1"
	Q1	4-4-0	2	Gateshead Works	1896	D18	Larger variant of class "Q" with 7-foot-7 1/4-inch (2.318 m) wheels
	H2	0-6-0T	3	Gateshead Works	1897–1907	J79	Derived from class "H" 0-4-0T
	E1	0-6-0T	20	Darlington Works	1898–99	J72	Another 55 built 1914–22 (see below)
	R	4-4-0	60	Gateshead Works	1899–07	D20	
	R1	4-4-0	10	Darlington Works	1908–09	D21	
	S	4-6-0	40	Gateshead Works	1899–1909	B13	
	S1	4-6-0	5	Gateshead Works	1900–01	B14	
	T	0-8-0	50	Gateshead Works	1901–04	Q5	
	T1	0-8-0	40	Darlington Works	1907–11	Q5	
	U	0-6-2T	20	Darlington Works	1902–03	N10	
	V	4-4-2	10	Gateshead Works	1903–04	C6	
	4CC	4-4-2	2	Gateshead Works	1906	C8	Four-cylinder compound, designed by Walter Smith
	V/09	4-4-2	10	Darlington Works	1910	C6	
	W	4-6-0T	10	Gateshead Works	1907–08	A6	Passenger tanks, rebuilt as 4-6-2T (NER Class W1) during 1914–17
	X	4-8-0T	10	Gateshead Works	1909–10	T1	For heavy shunting. Another 5 built by the LNER at Darlington Works in 1925.
	Y	4-6-2T	20	Darlington Works	1910–11	A7	for heavy freight, derived from class "X"

== Vincent Raven (1910–1922) ==
Vincent Raven was the last Chief Mechanical Engineer of the North Eastern Railway.

Image	Class	Type	Quantity	Manufacturer	Date	LNER Class	Notes
	V2	4-4-2	50	North British Locomotive Co. (20); Darlington Works (30)	1911–17	C7	Later redesignated class "Z"
	S2	4-6-0	20	Darlington Works	1911–13	B15	
	D	4-4-4T	45	Darlington Works	1913-22	H1	Rebuilt as 4-6-2T (1931–36), became LNER Class A8.
	T2	0-8-0	120	Darlington Works (70); Armstrong Whitworth (50)	1913–21	Q6	
	E1	0-6-0T	55	Darlington Works (30); Armstrong Whitworth (25)	1914-22	J72	Continuation of W. Worsdell design; another 10 built by the LNER at Doncaster Works in 1925; 28 built by BR at Darlington Works 1949–51
	W1	4-6-2T	10	Gateshead Works	1914-17	A6	Rebuild of W class
	T3	0-8-0	15	Darlington	1919	Q7	Three-cylinder simple.
	S3	4-6-0	38	Darlington Works	1919–23	B16	Another 32 built by the LNER
	P3	0-6-0	25	Darlington Works	1921–22	J27	Continuation of W. Worsdell design. Another 10 built by the LNER in 1923.
	4.6.2	4-6-2	2	Darlington Works	1922–24	A2	Another 3 built by the LNER in 1924

== Electric locomotives ==
All built for 1500 V DC overhead supply, except where noted.

Image	NER Nos.	Type	Quantity	Manufacturer	Date	Notes
	1–2	Bo-Bo	2	Gateshead / BTH / Brush	1905	600 V DC. For Newcastle Quayside branch. Also equipped with 3rd rail pick-up.
	3–12	Bo-Bo	10	Darlington Works	1914–18	For Newport – Shildon line. One later converted to LNER Class EB1.
	13	2-Co-2	1	Darlington Works	1922	Prototype for main-line electrification. Never saw service.

== Locomotives built to NER designs after 1922 ==
Image	NER Class	LNER Class	Type	Quantity	Manufacturer	Date	Notes
	H	Y7	0-4-0T	5	Darlington Works	1923	
	P3	J27	0-6-0	10	Darlington Works	1923	
	S3	B16	4-6-0	32	Darlington Works	1923–24	
	4.6.2	A2	4-6-2	3	Darlington Works	1924	
	X	T1	4-8-0T	5	Darlington Works	1925	
	E1	J72	0-6-0T	10	Doncaster Works	1925	
	E1	J72	0-6-0T	28	Darlington Works	1948–51	

== Locomotives from constituent railways ==
This is a summary list. For further information, select the link to the constituent railway.

NER no.	Wheels	Constituent railway	Date introduced	Comments
14	2-4-0	Great North of England Railway	1839	
40	2-2-2	Great North of England Railway	1839	
59	2-4-0	Great North of England Railway	1839	
60	2-4-0	Great North of England Railway	1839	
62	2-4-0	Great North of England Railway	1839	
63	2-4-0	York, Newcastle and Berwick Railway	1849	
64	2-4-0	Great North of England Railway	1839	
67	2-2-2	Great North of England Railway	1839	
68	2-2-2	Great North of England Railway	1839	
69	2-2-2	Great North of England Railway	1839	
73	2-4-0WT	York, Newcastle and Berwick Railway	1852	
76	2-4-0	York, Newcastle and Berwick Railway	1853	129 class (or 76 class)
129	2-4-0	York, Newcastle and Berwick Railway	1853	129 class (or 76 class)
136	2-4-0	York, Newcastle and Berwick Railway	1853	129 class (or 76 class)
147	2-2-2	York, Newcastle and Berwick Railway	1847	
148	2-2-2	York, Newcastle and Berwick Railway	1847	
149	0-4-2	York, Newcastle and Berwick Railway	1839	Ex-Newcastle & North Shields Railway
150	2-2-2	Newcastle & North Shields Railway	1839	
151	2-4-0	Newcastle & North Shields Railway	1839	
152	0-4-2	York, Newcastle and Berwick Railway	1840	Ex-Newcastle & North Shields Railway
153	2-2-2	Newcastle & North Shields Railway	1839	
156	2-4-0	York, Newcastle and Berwick Railway	1847	
157	2-2-2	York, Newcastle and Berwick Railway	1847	
161	2-2-2	York, Newcastle and Berwick Railway	1847	
162	2-2-2	York, Newcastle and Berwick Railway	1847	
165	2-4-0	York, Newcastle and Berwick Railway	1847/48	165 class
166	2-4-0	York, Newcastle and Berwick Railway	1847/48	165 class
170 or 171	0-6-0	York, Newcastle and Berwick Railway	1847	
171 or 172	0-6-0	York, Newcastle and Berwick Railway	1847	
172 or 173	0-6-0	York, Newcastle and Berwick Railway	1847	
175	0-6-0	York, Newcastle and Berwick Railway	1848	
177	2-4-0	York, Newcastle and Berwick Railway	1847/48	165 class
180	2-2-2	York, Newcastle and Berwick Railway	1848	
185	2-4-0	York, Newcastle and Berwick Railway	1848	185 class
186	2-4-0	York, Newcastle and Berwick Railway	1848	185 class
187	2-4-0	York, Newcastle and Berwick Railway	1848	185 class
188	2-4-0	York, Newcastle and Berwick Railway	1848	185 class
189	2-4-0	York, Newcastle and Berwick Railway	1848	185 class
190	2-2-2	York, Newcastle and Berwick Railway	1849	
207	2-4-0	York, Newcastle and Berwick Railway	1847/48	165 class
215	2-4-0	York, Newcastle and Berwick Railway	1853/54	
218	2-4-0	York, Newcastle and Berwick Railway	1853/54	
219	2-4-0	York, Newcastle and Berwick Railway	1853	
220	2-2-2	York, Newcastle and Berwick Railway	1854	220 class
221	2-2-2	York, Newcastle and Berwick Railway	1854	220 class
222	2-2-2	York, Newcastle and Berwick Railway	1854	220 class
223	2-2-2	York, Newcastle and Berwick Railway	1854	220 class
224	2-2-2	York, Newcastle and Berwick Railway	1854	220 class
225	2-2-2	York, Newcastle and Berwick Railway	1854	220 class
253	2-2-2	York and North Midland Railway	1841	
254	2-2-2	York and North Midland Railway	1841	
257	2-2-2	York and North Midland Railway	1841/42	
258	2-2-2	York and North Midland Railway	1841/42	
259	2-2-2	York and North Midland Railway	1841/42	
260	2-2-2	York and North Midland Railway	1841/42	
261	2-2-2	York and North Midland Railway	1841/42	
263	2-2-2	York and North Midland Railway	1841/42	
278	?	Hull and Selby Railway	1840	
279	?	Hull and Selby Railway	1840	
293	?	Hull and Selby Railway	1840	
305	?	Hull and Selby Railway	1840	
319	2-2-2	York and North Midland Railway	1847/48	
320	2-2-2	York and North Midland Railway	1847/48	
321	2-2-2	York and North Midland Railway	1847/48	
322	2-2-2	York and North Midland Railway	1847/48	
323	2-2-2	York and North Midland Railway	1847/48	
324	2-2-2	York and North Midland Railway	1847/48	
325	2-2-2	York and North Midland Railway	1847/48	
326	2-2-2	York and North Midland Railway	1847/48	
333	2-2-2	York and North Midland Railway	1847/48	
334	2-2-2	York and North Midland Railway	1847/48	
344	2-2-2	York and North Midland Railway	1847/48	
359-387	various	Leeds Northern Railway	-	

Newcastle and Carlisle locomotives
NER no.	N&C No.	Wheels	Name	Builder	Date	Comments
453	4	0-6-0	Hercules	Hawthorn	1857	
454	5	2-4-0	Samson	Hawthorn	1836	
455	6	0-6-0	Goliah	Hawthorn	1836	
456	7	0-6-0	Atlas	Stephenson	1861	
457	8	0-6-0	Tvne	Hawthorn	1861	
453	9	0-6-0	Eden	Stephenson	1861	
459	10	0-4-2	Lightning	Hawks & Thompson	1837	
460	11	0-6-0	Newcastle	Hawthorn	1860	
461	12	0-6-0	Carlisle	Hawthorn	1860	
462	13	2-4-0	Wellington	Hawthorn	1838	
463	14	2-4-0	Victoria	Hawks & Thompson	1838	
464	15	2-4-0	Nelson	Hawthorn	1838	
465	16	2-4-0	Northumberland	Hawthorn	1838	
466	17	2-4-0	Cumberland	Hawthorn	1838	
467	18	0-6-0	Durham	Hawthorn	1839	
468	19	0-4-2	Sun	Hawthorn	1839	
469	21	0-6-0	Matthew plumber	Thompson Brothers	1839	
470	22	0-6-0	adelaide	Thompson Brothers	1840	
471	23	0-6-0	Mars	Thompson Brothers	1840	
472	24	2-4-0	Jupiter	Thompson Brothers	1840	
473	25	2-4-0	Venus	Thompson Brothers	1841	
474	26	0-6-0	Saturn	Thompson Brothers	1841	
475	27	0-6-0	Globe	Hawthorn	1846	
476	28	0-6-0	Planet	Hawthorn	1846	
477	29	0-6-0	Albert	Hawthorn	1847	
478	30	2-4-0	Swift	Hawthorn	1847	
479	31	2-4-0	Collingwood	Hawthorn	1848	
480	32	0-6-0	Allen	Hawthorn	1848	
481	33	0-6-0	Alston	Stephenson	1850	
482	34	0-6-0	Hexham	Stephenson	1850	
483	35	0-6-0	Prudhoe	Hawthorn	1852	
484	36	0-6-0	Naworth	Hawthorn	1853	
485	37	0-6-0	Blenkinsopp	Stephenson	1853	
486	38	0-6-0	Bywell	Stephenson	1853	
487	39	0-6-0	Dilston	Hawthorn	1855	
488	40	0-6-0	Langley	Hawthorn	1855	
489	41	0-6-0	Thirwell	Stephenson	1855	
490	42	0-6-0	Lanercosl	Stephenson	1855	
491	43	0-6-0	Featherstonehaugh	Hawthorn	1857	

Stockton and Darlington Railway

The Stockton and Darlington Railway (SDR) was absorbed in 1863. The SDR contributed 157 locomotives to the NER stock and these initially kept their SDR numbers. From 1873, the SDR locomotives were renumbered, mostly by adding 1000.

== Preserved locomotives ==
Image	NER No.	NER Class	Type	Manufacturer	Serial No.	Date	Notes
	1275	1001	0-6-0	Dübs & Co.	708	1874	Static exhibit; National Collection, York
	910	901	2-4-0	Gateshead Works		1875	Static exhibit; National Collection, Shildon
	1463	1463	2-4-0	Darlington Works		1885	Static exhibit; National Collection, Darlington Railway Centre and Museum
	876	C1	0-6-0	Gateshead Works		1889	BR: 65033; under restoration
	1310	H	0-4-0T	Gateshead Works		1891	Middleton Railway
	1621	M1	4-4-0	Gateshead Works		1893	Static exhibit; National Collection, Shildon
	66	66	2-2-4T	Gateshead Works		1869/1902	Named "Aerolite"; static exhibit; National Collection, Shildon.
	1	(ES1)	Bo-Bo	Gateshead / BTH / Brush		1905	Static exhibit; National Collection, Shildon
	2238	T2	0-8-0	Darlington Works		1918	BR: 63395; North Yorkshire Moors Railway. Owned by the North Eastern Locomotive Preservation Group
	901	T3	0-8-0	Darlington Works		1919	Static exhibit; National Collection, Darlington Railway Centre and Museum
Locomotives built to NER designs after 1922
	LNER; 945	Y7 (NER H)	0-4-0T	Darlington Works		1923	At Beamish Museum, on loan from North Norfolk Railway
	LNER; 2392	J27 (NER P3)	0-6-0	Darlington Works		1923	Owned by the North Eastern Locomotive Preservation Group
	BR; 69023	J72 (NER E1)	0-6-0T	Darlington Works	2151	1951	Renumbered 59 in the Eastern Region Departmental list. Owned by the North Eastern Locomotive Preservation Group

In addition to these locomotives, 2 new build steam locomotives are under construction:

The first is a replica of NER Class O 0-4-4T No. 1759. The locomotive is currently under construction by the Class G5 Locomotive Company at a site in Shildon as of 2023.

The other is a replica of NER Class K 0-4-0T No. 559. The locomotive is being built at the Beamish Museum in Stanley, County Durham as of 2023.

== See also ==
- LNER locomotive numbering and classification
