= NER 38 Class =

Type and origin
- Power type: Steam
- Designer: Alexander McDonnell
- Builder: NER Gateshead Works (16); Hawthorn, Leslie & Co (12)
- Serial number: HL: 1996–2007
- Build date: 1884–1885
- Total produced: 28
Specifications
- Configuration
  - Whyte: 4-4-0
  - UIC: 2′B n2
- Gauge: 4 ft 8 1/2 in (1,435 mm)
- Leading dia.: 3 ft 1 1/4 in (946 mm)
- Driver dia.: 6 ft 8 1/4 in (2,038 mm)
- Wheelbase: 40 ft 6 1/4 in (12.351 m)
- Length: 49 ft 11 3/4 in (15.234 m)
- Axle load: 14 long tons 12 cwt (32,700 lb or 14.8 t)
- Adhesive weight: 26 long tons 16 cwt (60,000 lb or 27.2 t)
- Loco weight: 39 long tons 2 cwt (87,600 lb or 39.7 t)
- Tender weight: 27 long tons 14 cwt (62,000 lb or 28.1 t)
- Total weight: 66 long tons 16 cwt (149,600 lb or 67.9 t)
- Fuel type: Coal
- Fuel capacity: 4 long tons 0 cwt (9,000 lb or 4.1 t)
- Water cap.: 2,500 imp gal (11,000 L)
- Firebox
  - Grate area: 15.16 sq ft (1.408 m^{2})
- Boiler pressure: 140 psi (970 kPa)
- Heating surface
  - Firebox: 98 sq ft (9.1 m^{2})
  - Tubes: 999 sq ft (92.8 m^{2})
  - Total surface: 1,097 sq ft (101.9 m^{2})
- Cylinders: Two, inside
- Cylinder size: 17 in × 24 in (430 mm × 610 mm)
- Valve gear: Stephenson
- Valve type: Slide
Performance figures
- Tractive effort: 11,760 lbf (52.3 kN)
Career
- Operators: North Eastern Railway
- Class: 38
- Number in class: 28
- Withdrawn: 1915–23
- Disposition: All scrapped
- Dimensions above are those of the Hawthorn locos as fitted with Worsdell boilers.

The NER 38 Class was a class of 4-4-0 steam locomotives designed by Alexander McDonnell for the North Eastern Railway. Twenty-eight were built in 1884–5, and remained in service until 1915–23.

== History ==
At the time of Alexander McDonnell's appointment as Locomotive Superintendent of the North Eastern Railway (NER), the most modern express passenger locomotives were the 2-4-0s of Edward Fletcher's '901' class, 55 of which had been built between 1872 and 1882, and which were giving good service. However, like most of Fletcher's designs, there was a lack of standardisation; three different builders had been involved in their construction, each being given freedom to vary the design as they saw fit.

McDonnell set about designing a new class of express passenger locomotives, which incorporated a number of departures from established NER practice. Some of these were significant, such as the use of a leading bogie on an express locomotive; others were purely cosmetic, such as the shape of the chimney. The biggest change was that the driving position was placed on the left-hand side of the cab, instead of the right – the drivers did not like this change at all, and found fault with most of the other unfamiliar features. So much pressure was put on McDonnell that he resigned in September 1884. Despite this, uncompleted orders were allowed to stand, apart from the last batch of eight which were cancelled; components which had already been manufactured for these were incorporated into some 0-6-0T locomotives which Henry Tennant's locomotive committee designed; these became the '8' class (LNER J74).

=== Construction ===
| Dates | Builder | Quantity | NER numbers | Notes |
|---|---|---|---|---|
| February–September 1884 | NER, Gateshead | 8 | 1318, 186, 180, 426, 664, 576, 385, 500 | |
| September–December 1884 | NER, Gateshead | 8 | 1331, 38, 112, 231, 126, 158, 234, 281 | |
| October 1884–April 1885 | Hawthorn, Leslie & Co (works nos. 1996–2007) | 12 | 1492–1503 | |
| — | NER, Gateshead | 8 | — | cancelled |

Like other NER classes introduced prior to 1885, these locomotives were not given a classification at first; but T.W. Worsdell, having placed his own designs in lettered classes, organised the others into classes which were given an identification based upon the number of one of the class members; these accordingly became the '38' class, no. 38 being one of the Gateshead-built locos.

Initially placed in service on main line duties, they were soon relegated to less important jobs. These included the Newcastle and Carlisle line, which had several of the Hawthorn engines, and secondary services from York, Malton, Whitby and Scarborough.

=== Rebuilding ===
Between August 1895 and August 1900, the locomotives had their original boilers replaced by standard boilers of Worsdell design, of a type also used on several other NER locomotives, such as the '901' and '1440' classes, Class L, Class O and Class P. The new boilers had slightly smaller fireboxes, but had increased heating surface and water circulation space compared to the originals.

=== Withdrawal ===
In January 1915, nos. 231, 1495/8 were withdrawn from service; by the end of the year, a further ten had been withdrawn. The remainder followed at intervals between 1917 and 1921, leaving just one locomotive, no. 281, still in service at the start of 1923, when the NER became a constituent of the newly formed London and North Eastern Railway (LNER); it was withdrawn from service in February 1923, and was never allocated a LNER classification.
