= NER Class S3 =

Class of 70 British 4-6-0 locomotives

NER Class S3 LNER Class B16
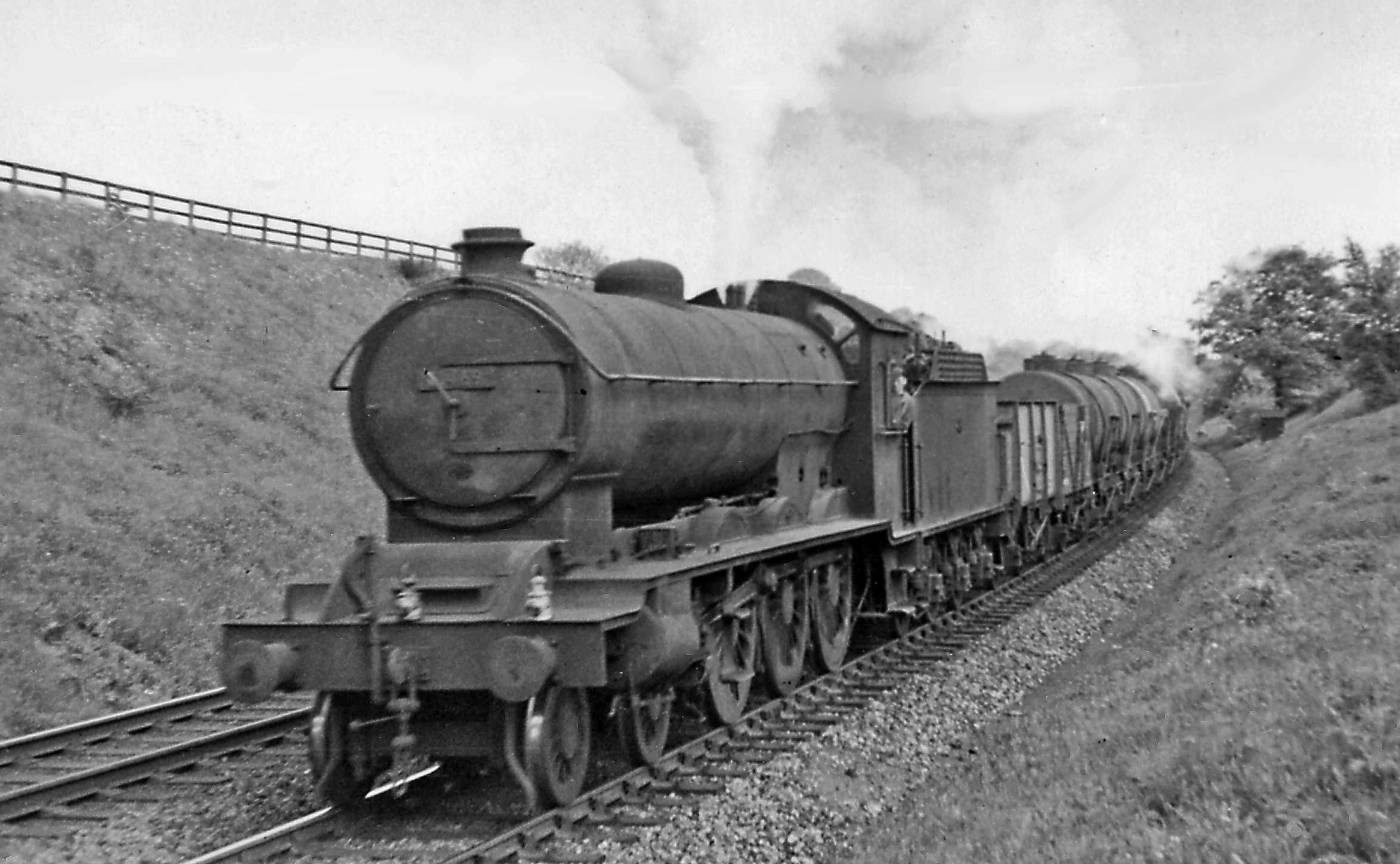
- A B16/1 at Croxdale on 12 June 1954
Type and origin
- Power type: Steam
- Designer: Vincent Raven
- Builder: NER Darlington
- Build date: 1919-1924
- Total produced: 70
Specifications
- Configuration
  - Whyte: 4-6-0
- Gauge: 4 ft 8 1/2 in (1,435 mm) standard gauge
- Leading dia.: 3 ft 1 in (0.940 m)
- Driver dia.: 5 ft 8 in (1.727 m)
- Wheelbase: 27 ft 8 in (8.43 m) engine (B16/1 and B16/3); 28 ft 6 in (8.69 m) engine (B16/2); 12 ft 8 in (3.86 m) tender 52 ft 5 7/8 in (15.999 m) total (B16/1 and B16/3); 53 ft 3 7/8 in (16.253 m) total (B16/2)
- Length: 62 ft 6 in (19.050 m) (B16/1 and B16/3); 63 ft 4 in (19.304 m) (B16/2)
- Width: 8 ft 8 3/4 in (2.661 m)
- Height: 13 ft 0 1/2 in (3.975 m)
- Axle load: 20 long tons (20 t; 22 short tons)
- Loco weight: B16/1, 77.7 long tons (78.9 t; 87.0 short tons); B16/2, 79.2 long tons (80.5 t; 88.7 short tons); B16/3, 78.95 long tons (80.22 t; 88.42 short tons)
- Tender weight: 46.6 long tons (47.3 t; 52.2 short tons)
- Total weight: B16/1, 124.3 long tons (126.3 t; 139.2 short tons); B16/2, 125.8 long tons (127.8 t; 140.9 short tons); B16/3, 125.55 long tons (127.56 t; 140.62 short tons)
- Fuel type: Coal
- Fuel capacity: 5 long tons 10 cwt (12,300 lb or 5.6 t)
- Water cap.: 4,125 imp gal (18,750 L; 4,954 US gal)
- Firebox
  - Grate area: 27 sq ft (2.5 m^{2})
- Boiler
  - Model: 5 ft 6 in (1.68 m) diameter
  - Type: LNER Diagram 49 (later LNER Diagram 49A)
  - Tube plates: 16 ft 8 1/2 in (5,093 mm)
- Boiler pressure: 180 psi (1.2 MPa)
- Heating surface
  - Firebox: 166 sq ft (15.4 m^{2})
  - Tubes: 866 sq ft (80.5 m^{2})
  - Flues: 534 sq ft (49.6 m^{2})
  - Total surface: 1,958 sq ft (181.9 m^{2})
- Superheater
  - Heating area: 392 sq ft (36.4 m^{2})
- Cylinders: three
- Cylinder size: 18 1/2 in × 26 in (470 mm × 660 mm)
- Valve gear: Stephenson (B16/1); Walschaerts/Gresley conjugated valve gear (B16/2); Walschaerts on all three cylinders (B16/3)
Performance figures
- Tractive effort: 30,312 lbf (134.83 kN)
Career
- Operators: North Eastern Railway, London & North Eastern Railway, British Railways
- Power class: BR: 5MT
- Numbers: NER : 840-844, 846-847, 845, 848-849, 906, 908-909, 911, 914-915, 920-934, 936-937, 942-943, 2363-2365; LNER (1924): NER locomotives retained original numbers; new builds: 2366-2382, 1371-1385; LNER (1946): 1400-1468; BR: 61410-61478
- Locale: North Eastern Region
- Retired: 1942 (1); 1958-1964
- Disposition: All scrapped

The North Eastern Railway Class S3, classified B16 by the LNER, was a class of 4-6-0 steam locomotive designed for mixed traffic work. It was designed by Vincent Raven and introduced in 1920. The earlier members of this class were fitted with Westinghouse Brakes - all of this equipment was removed during the 1930s.

== History ==
In 1915, the British Government took control of the country's railways. This paused the development of new locomotives, rolling stock, and infrastructure. One such railway, the North Eastern Railway, was planning to electrify its portion of the East Coast Main Line between York and Newcastle.

In the same year, Chief Mechanical Engineer, Vincent Raven, was appointed as the Superintendent of the Royal Arsenal in Woolwich and would not return to Darlington until 1919. Standing in for Raven was his assistant, Arthur Cowie Stamer.

Meanwhile, plans were made to nationalise the railways. However, doing so would require standardized locomotives and rolling stock under the Association of Railway and Locomotive Engineers (ARLE). While the ARLE would agree on a mixed-traffic 2-6-0 with 5-foot 8-inch driving wheels, the North Eastern Railway and the London & North Western Railway opted out of the design process. Instead, Stamer instructed Chief Draughtsman George Heppell to produce drawings for three locomotive assignments: express passenger, express freight, and mineral traffic. These were to be built with ARLE specifications and contemporary Darlington practices. Notably, the locomotive had to share valve gear, cylinders, and boilers with at least one other class, which was common for railways in the UK at the time. Each locomotive also had to weigh at least 75 tons without a tender, with an axle loading no greater than 20 tons. Two of these drawings were approved: a 4-6-0 for express freight traffic and an 0-8-0 for mineral traffic. Both had three cylinders with Stephenson link motion. These had an 18.5-inch bore by a 26-inch stroke. The boilers were based on the Z Class 4-4-2 and were pressed at 180 psi. To provide a good balance between speed and adhesion, 5-foot 8-inch driving wheels were chosen. This fell in line with the Mogul drawn up by the ARLE, with both the Great Northern Railway and Great Western Railway using driving wheels of the same diameter for express freight traffic and suburban passenger trains.

As previously stated, the boiler would also be interchangeable with the T3 Class (LNER Q7) 0-8-0s, much like the S2s, which had interchangeable wheels and cylinders with the S Class and interchangeable cylinders and boilers with the T2 Class (LNER Q6) 0-8-0s. The result was the S3 Class (LNER B16). After approval, Stamer placed an order for 10 locomotives of the S3 Class in November 1918, with the first five members, Nos. 840-844 appearing in December 1919 from Darlington Works.

== Post-NER ==
Seventy S3/B16 locomotives were built between 1919 and 1924. The NER began numbering this class in the range No. 840 through to No. 943 (though not consecutively), those built after late 1922 (from No. 2365 onwards) directly receiving their LNER number. By the Groupings of 1923, 38 locomotives passed to the London and North Eastern Railway (LNER), which built thirty-two more starting with No. 2366 on 4 January 1923 and ending with Nos. 1384 and 1385 on 1 January 1924. Twenty-four of the class were rebuilt starting in the 1930s and 1940s. The original Raven-designed locomotives were designated class B16/1. Gresley rebuilt seven of the B16/1s, these formed class B16/2. Later Thompson ordered seventeen more B16/1s to be rebuilt; these were designated class B16/3.

Under the LNER, the B16s hardly ever left the North East. Their duties included fast freights, express passenger trains, excursions to Scarborough, and even football specials. During World War II, some of the B16s moved to the Great Central Main Line, working around Banbury and Woodford Halse After World War II, the B16s were used on their pre-war duties but were also used as far south as Peterborough, where they substituted for a failed V2 2-6-2 or a Thompson B1. The 1940s saw the entire class receive new boilers; the last one was refitted in the late 1950s. Under the LNER renumbering scheme of 1946, they received numbers 1400–1468. All but one of the B16s survived into BR ownership, and were renumbered 61400–61468. (Nos. 61400-61409 were later renumbered 61469-61478 so that their old numbers could be given to the last ten of Thompson's B1 Class).

== Withdrawals ==
One locomotive, No. 925, was badly damaged (along with A4 4469 Sir Ralph Wedgwood) during a German air-raid on York on 29 April 1942, and was subsequently scrapped. The first withdrawal under British Railways was B16/1 No. 61474 from Selby on 20 January 1958. Given the class's age and with the Modernisation Plan already in full swing, withdrawals were rapid. Due to the complicated maintenance and proneness to leaking piston valves, the B16/1s were all retired first. The last, of any variety of the B16s, was B16/2 No. 61435, being withdrawn on 21 July 1964. The last member to be scrapped was B16/3 No. 61472 on 9 November 1964; none have been preserved.

== Sub-classes ==
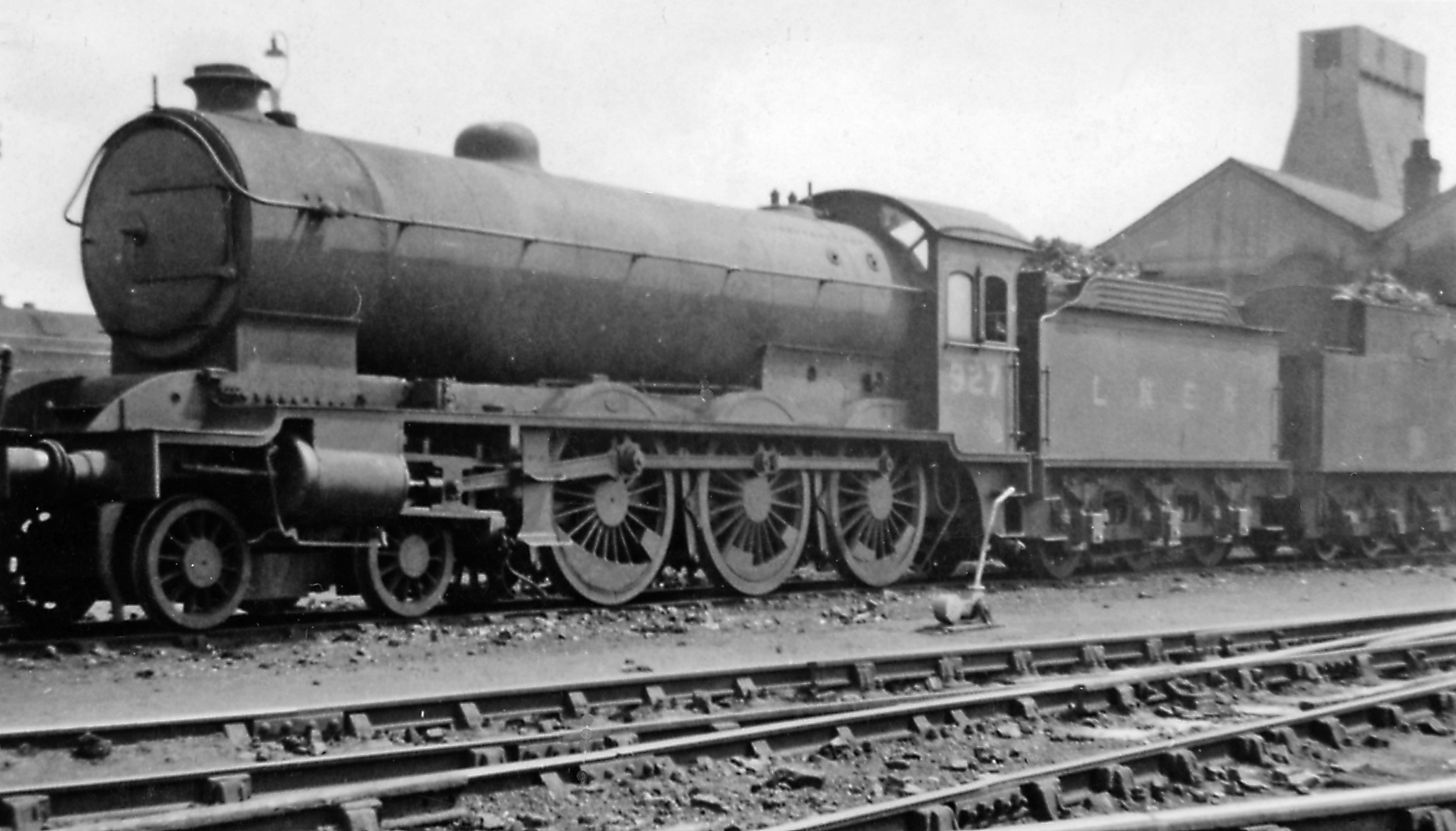
B16/1 No. 927, at New England, 1946

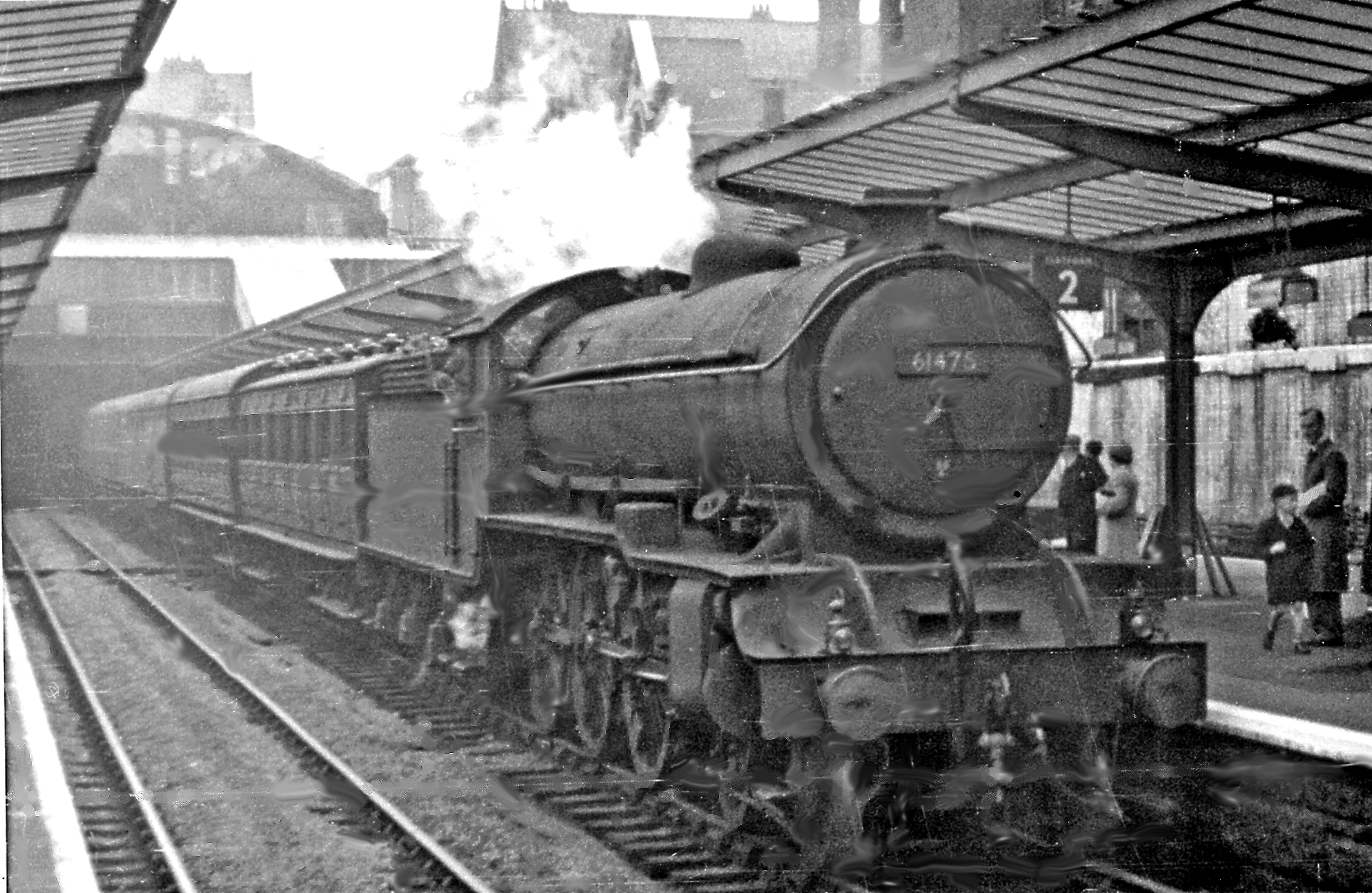
B16/2 No. 61475 at Sunderland station 27 June 1953.

- B16/1 Introduced 1920, NER design by Vincent Raven with inside Stephenson valve gear.
- B16/2 Introduced 1937, LNER rebuilds of B16/1 by Nigel Gresley with Walschaerts valve gear on the outside cylinders and Gresley conjugated valve gear on the inside cylinder.
- B16/3 Introduced 1944, LNER rebuilds of B16/1 by Edward Thompson with three sets of Walschaerts valve gear and left-hand drive.

== Accidents and incidents ==
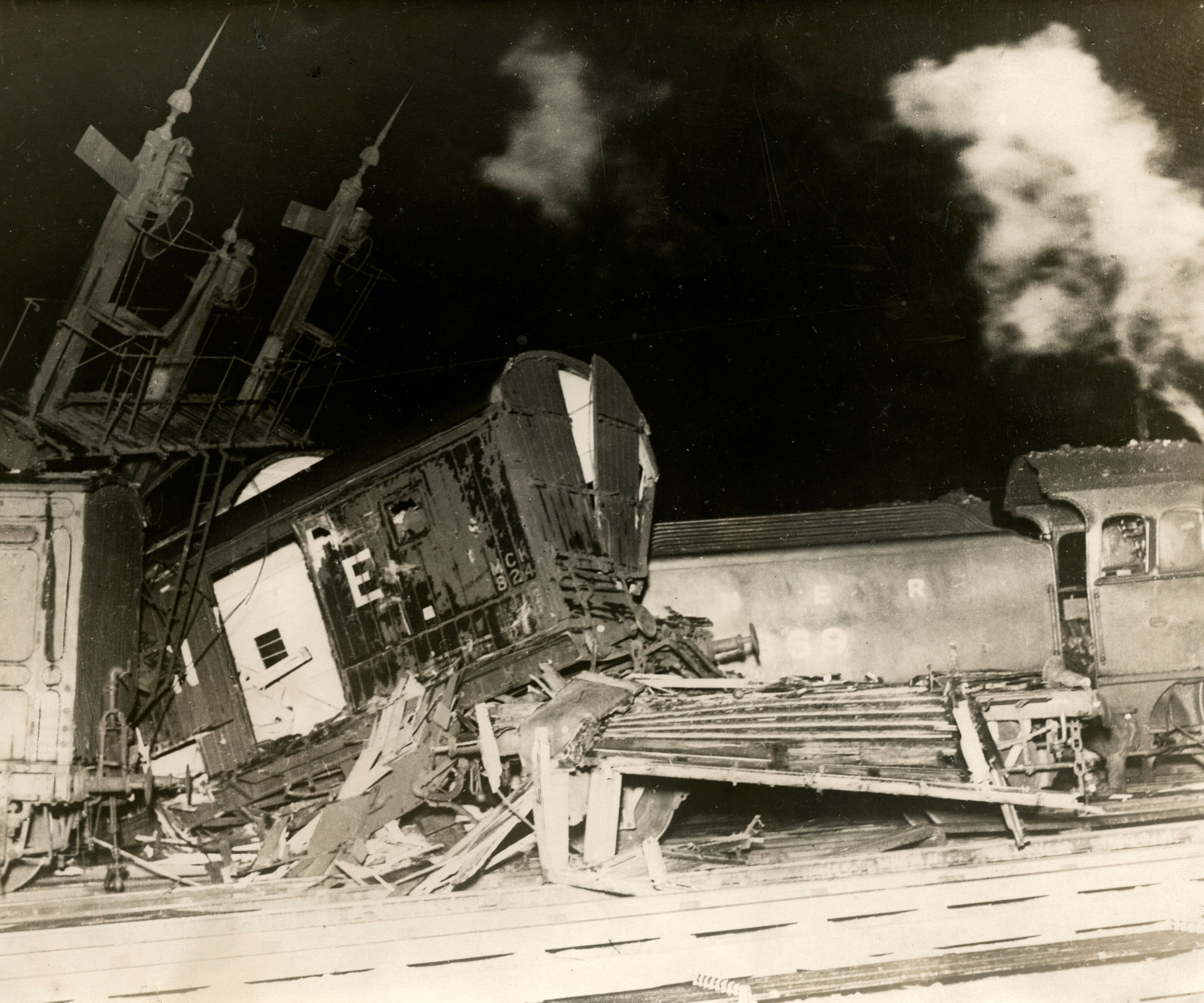
2369 in the 1928 Darlington Rail Crash

- On 27 June 1928, locomotive No. 2369 was involved in a head-on collision with an excursion train at Darlington, County Durham whilst it was shunting a parcels train. Twenty-five people were killed and 45 were injured.
- On 5 January 1946, locomotive No. 842 was hauling a freight train which became divided on the East Coast Main Line in County Durham. The train was brought to a halt at Browney Signalbox, but the rear portion crashed into it. The wreckage fouled signal cables, giving a false clear to a passenger train coming in the opposite direction. This train then collided with the wreckage. Ten people were killed and eight were severely injured.

== See also ==
- Locomotives of the North Eastern Railway
