= NER Class H =

Class of British steam locomotives

NER Class H LNER Class Y7
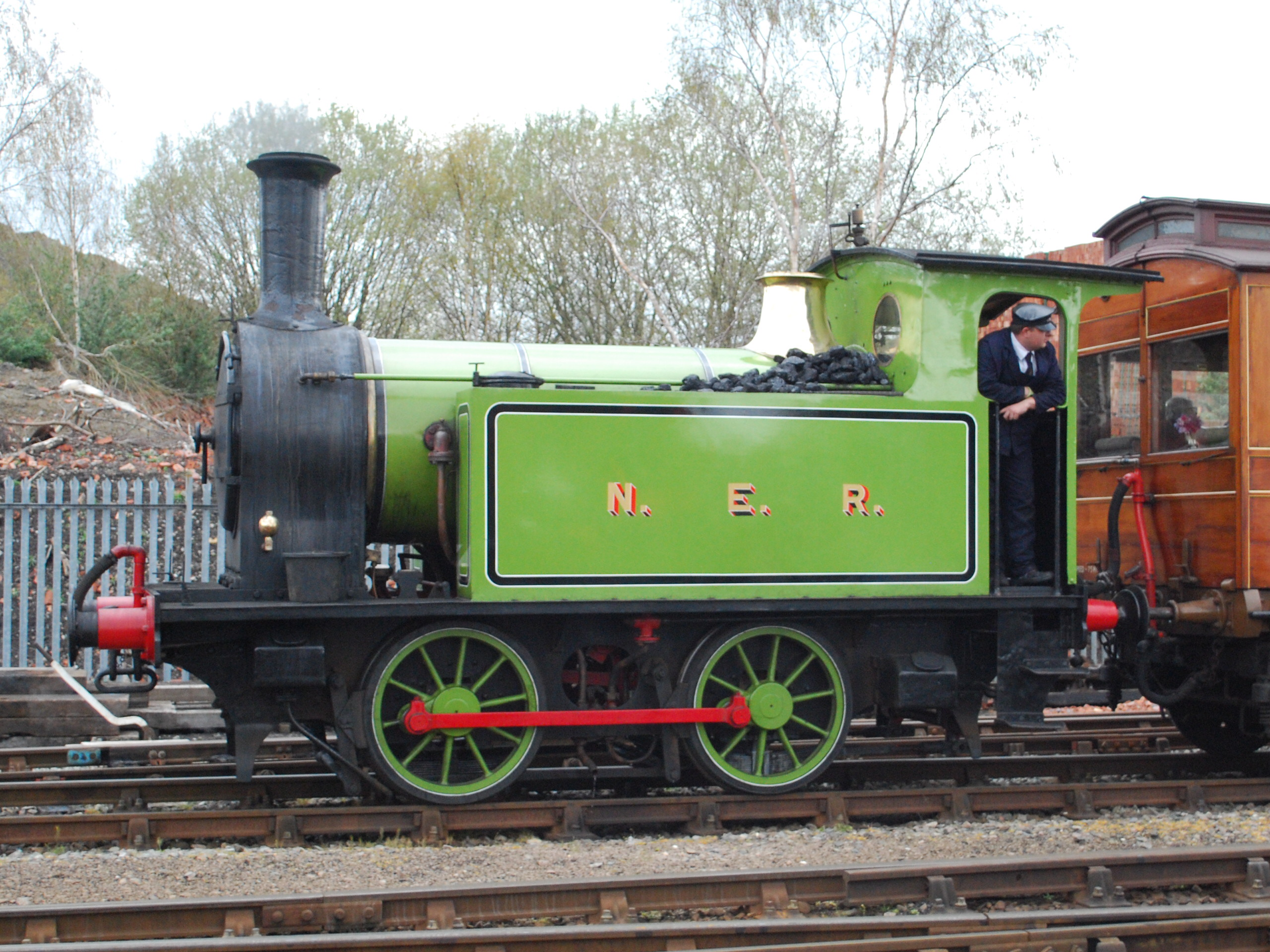
- 1310 at Barrow Hill, April 2012
Type and origin
- Power type: Steam
- Designer: T. W. Worsdell
- Builder: Gateshead Works (19); Darlington Works (5)
- Build date: 1888–1923
- Total produced: 24
Specifications
- Configuration
  - Whyte: 0-4-0T
  - UIC: B 2nt
- Gauge: 4 ft 8 1/2 in (1,435 mm)
- Driver dia.: 3 ft 6 1/4 in (1.073 m)
- Wheelbase: 6 ft 0 in (1.83 m)
- Length: 20 ft 4 in (6.20 m)
- Width: 7 ft 1 in (2.16 m)
- Height: 12 ft 0 in (3.66 m)
- Axle load: 13 long tons 0 cwt (29,100 lb or 13.2 t)
- Loco weight: 22 long tons 14 cwt (50,800 lb or 23.1 t) full
- Fuel type: Coal
- Fuel capacity: 6.25 long cwt (700 lb; 318 kg)
- Water cap.: 500 imp gal (2,300 L; 600 US gal)
- Firebox
  - Grate area: 11.3 sq ft (1.05 m^{2})
- Boiler: LNER diagram 74
- Boiler pressure: 140 psi (0.97 MPa)
- Heating surface
  - Firebox: 57 sq ft (5.3 m^{2})
  - Tubes: 448 sq ft (41.6 m^{2})
- Cylinders: Two, inside
- Cylinder size: 14 in × 20 in (356 mm × 508 mm)
Performance figures
- Tractive effort: 11,040 lbf (49.11 kN)
Career
- Operators: NER » LNER » BR
- Class: NER: H LNER: Y7
- Power class: 0F
- Axle load class: Route availability: 1
- Retired: 1929–1952
- Preserved: Two: 1310, 985

The North Eastern Railway (NER) Class H, classified as Class Y7 by the London and North Eastern Railway (LNER) is a class of 0-4-0T steam locomotives designed for shunting.

== Description ==
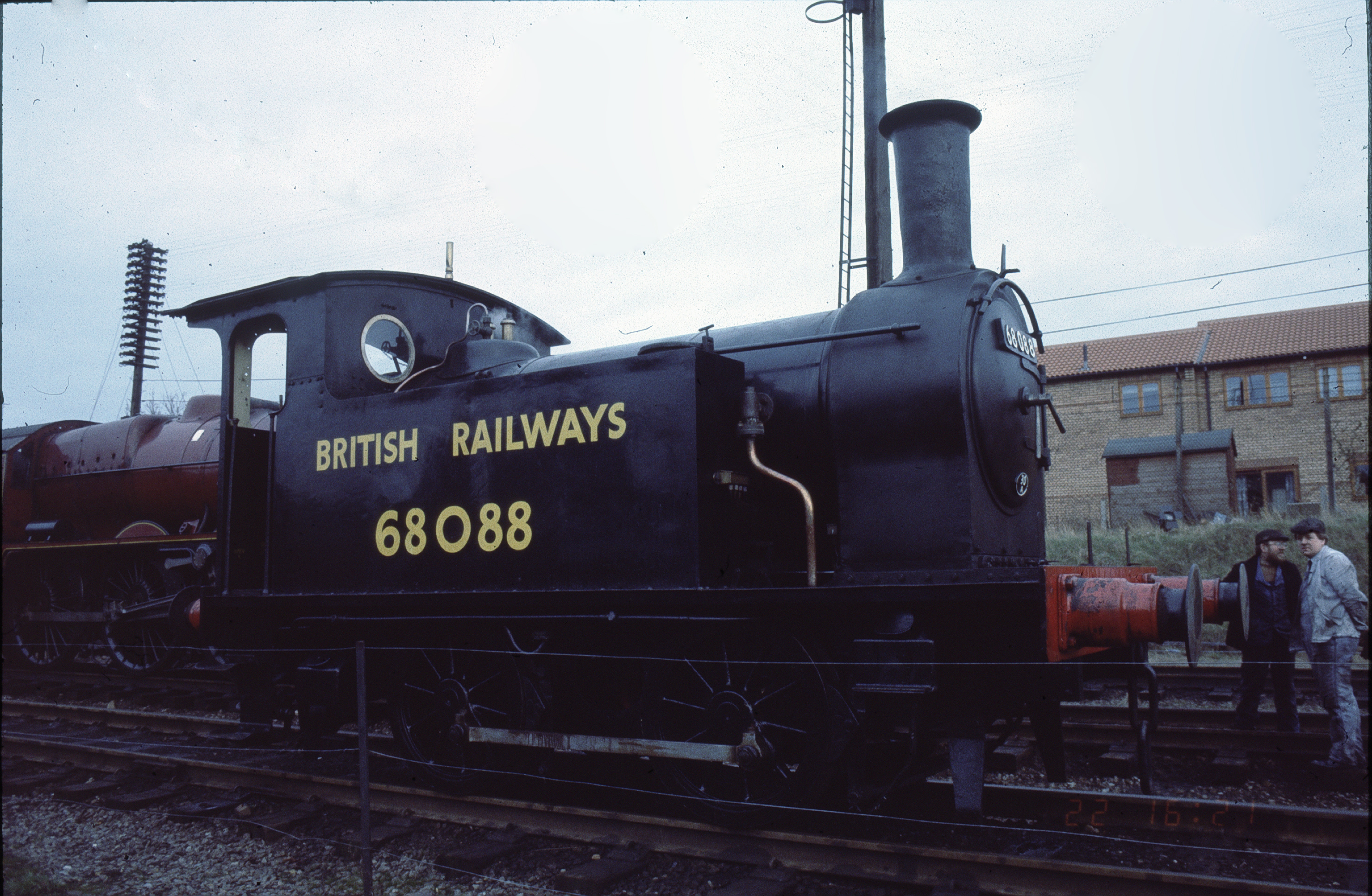
68088 at Loughborough

Introduced in 1888 by Thomas W. Worsdell, six were built in 1888. Their simple, bare design easily navigated the tight curves and poor quality track which they ran on. The H proved so successful, that the NER ordered a further ten in 1891, three in 1897 and five more were ordered by the LNER in 1923.

Coal was carried in side bunkers incorporated into the side tanks. The absence of a rear bunker and the small size of the cab provided the driver with a clear view of the buffer bar when reversing onto a train. The H shared their simple domeless boiler design with the H1 (J78) and H2 (J79) classes.

The locos were originally fitted with dumb buffers, but these were changed for small round buffers during the 1930s, some also gaining vacuum brakes during this period; only hand and steam brakes were fitted when built.

Locomotives operating at Tyne Dock were altered to take shunting poles on each corner of the loco, giving the ability to pull a wagon on an adjacent line.

== Numbering and livery ==
The LNER originally painted the Y7s in black with quarter-inch vermilion lining; repaints after 1928 omitted this with locomotives in plain black.

Two entered British Railways stock in 1948, becoming BR 68088 and 68089.

== Operation and preservation ==
The original work of these locos was on Tyneside, at Hull docks, and within Darlington works, but LNER no. 8088 was recorded working at Stratford works between 1943 and 1952.

Dock work was hit hard by the depression, and between 1929 and 1932 the sixteen locomotives which made up the first two batches delivered were withdrawn, nine being sold to industrial use while the remainder were scrapped.

At least one operated passenger trains on the North Sunderland Railway before its closure in 1951.

Two have survived to preservation:

- NER No. 1310 (Gateshead, 1891), was withdrawn in 1931 and sold to Robert Frazer & Sons, and sold on to Pelaw Main Collieries Limited in 1933. It passed to the National Coal Board in 1949, who renumbered it 63. In 1965, it was bought by the Steam Power Trust, and has been located at the Middleton Railway since 1965.
- LNER No. 985 (Darlington, 1923), was renumbered 8088 by the LNER in 1946. It passed to British Railways in 1948, who renumbered it as 68088, and transferred it to the Eastern Region departmental fleet. It was sold to the National Coal Board in November 1952 and worked at Bentick and Thurgaton Collieries until 1964 when it was purchased by the Y7 Preservation Society. This locomotive has been located at the Mid-Suffolk Light Railway since 2016.

== Sources ==
- Ian Allan ABC of British Railways Locomotives, part 4 (1948 ed.). p. 46.
- Baxter, Bertram (1986). Baxter, David (ed.). British Locomotive Catalogue 1825–1923. Vol. 5A: North Eastern Railway, Hull and Barnsley Railway. Ashbourne, Derbyshire: Moorland Publishing Company. pp. 164–165. ISBN 0-903485-54-0.
- Boddy, M. G.; Brown, W. A.; Fry, E. V.; Hennigan, W.; Hoole, Ken; Manners, F.; Neve, E.; Platt, E. N. T.; Proud, P.; Yeadon, W. B. (June 1977). Fry, E. V. (ed.). Locomotives of the L.N.E.R., Part 9B: Tank Engines—Classes Q1 to Z5. Kenilworth: RCTS. pp. 93–99. ISBN 0-901115-41-X.
