= D22 =

D22 may refer to:

== Ships ==
- General Moran, an Almirante Clemente-class destroyer of the Venezuelan Navy
- Greek destroyer Thyella (D22), a Fletcher-class destroyer of the Hellenic Navy
- HMAS Waterhen (D22), a W-class destroyer of the Royal Navy and Royal Australian Navy
- HMS Aisne (D22), a Battle-class destroyer of the Royal Navy
- Spanish destroyer Almirante Ferrándiz (D22), a Fletcher-class destroyer of the Spanish Navy

== Other uses ==
- D22 road (Croatia)
- Darmstadt D-22, a German sport plane
- Dublin 22, a postal district in Ireland
- Kelantan State Route D22, now Malaysia Federal Route 196
- LNER Class D22, a class of British steam locomotives
- Nissan Navara, a pickup truck
