= NER 398 Class =

Steam locomotive class

Type and origin
- Power type: Steam
- Designer: Edward Fletcher
- Builder: Robert Stephenson & Co. (80); R and W Hawthorn (30); Neilson and Company (10); Sharp, Stewart & Co. (20); Dübs and Company (20); NER Gateshead Works (105); NER Darlington Works (51); NER York Works (3)
- Serial number: RS&C: 2051–2080, 2151–2180, 2261–2280; R&WH: 1561–1580, 1623–1632; Neilson: 1809–1818; Sharp: 2540–2550; Dübs: 863–882
- Build date: 1872–1883
- Total produced: 326
- Rebuild date: Various locomotives rebuilt 1880–1900
- Number rebuilt: 181
Specifications
- Configuration
  - Whyte: 0-6-0
- Driver dia.: 5 ft 0.375 in (1.53353 m)
- Loco weight: 37 long tons (38 t)
- Boiler: 4 ft 2 in (1.27 m) diameter
- Boiler pressure: 140 psi (0.97 MPa)
- Heating surface: 1,138 sq ft (105.7 m^{2})
- Cylinders: 2 (inside)
- Cylinder size: 17 in × 24 in (430 mm × 610 mm) some later rebuilt to 17 1/2 in × 24 1/2 in (440 mm × 620 mm)
- Valve gear: Stephenson
Career
- Operators: North Eastern Railway; London and North Eastern Railway
- Retired: 1903-1928
- Disposition: all scrapped

The NER 398 Class was a class of 0-6-0 freight steam locomotive of the North Eastern Railway, designed by Edward Fletcher. in 1872. A total of 326 locomotives-of the class were built for the NER.

== History ==
Following the success of his NER 398 Class, Fletcher realised that the outside sandwich frames used on this class were unnecessary. He therefore designed a version of this class with inside frames, although the sandwich frames were retained on the tenders. The first batch of thirty of these were constructed by Robert Stephenson and Company of Newcastle between April 1872 and June 1873 at a time when the final examples of the 398 class on order were still under construction. The class quickly proved its worth and became the standard freight locomotive on the NER. Further batches were built by R and W Hawthorn; Neilson and Company; Sharp, Stewart and Company; Dübs and Company; NER Gateshead railway works over the next decade. Different batches had minor detail differences in the cab styling and other equipment All were later classified by Wilson Worsdell as the ‘398 class’. As built they were fitted with handbrakes only but most were later fitted with steam brake or Westinghouse Air Brakes. Likewise stronger Worsdell boilers were fitted to the class during the 1880s following a number of boiler explosions. During the 1880s and 1890s more than half of the class were rebuilt, in different ways. Some were fitted with larger 4 ft 3 in (1.30 m) diameter boilers and operated at 140 psi (0.97 MPa) pressure. A few were fitted with 4 ft 6 in (1.37 m) driving wheels. The class continued to be used until withdrawal began in 1903. There were 86 examples still in service at the formation of the London and North Eastern Railway in 1923, with the last examples surviving until 1928.

== Accidents and incidents ==
Three locomotives from the class suffered from boiler explosions. No. 787 in November 1878, No. 941 November 1880 and No. 204 in October 1881. All three locomotives were subsequently repaired and returned to service.

== Sources ==
- Baxter, Bertram (1986). Baxter, David (ed.). British Locomotive Catalogue 1825–1923, Volume 5A: North Eastern Railway, Hull and Barnsley Railway. Ashbourne, Derbyshire: Moorland Publishing. ISBN 0-903485-54-0.
- Casserley, H.C.; Johnson, S. W. (1966). Locomotives at the Grouping 2: London and North Eastern Railway. Shepperton, Surrey: Ian Allan. ISBN 0-7110-0553-2.
- Nock, O.S. (1974). Locomotives of the North Eastern Railway. London: Ian Allan. ISBN 0-7110-0493-5-.
