= NER Class B1 =

Class of British steam locomotives

NER B1 Class LNER Class N8
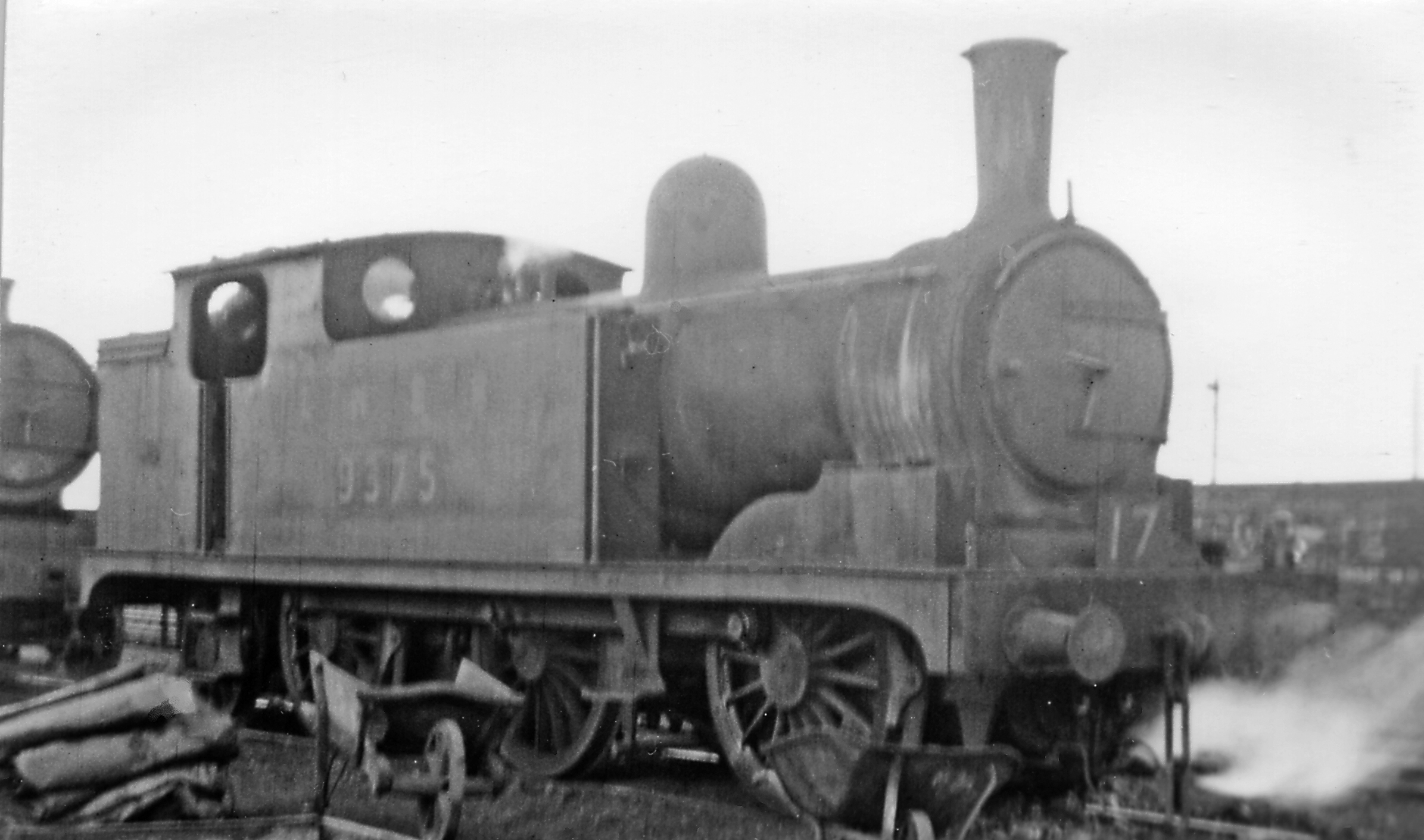
- LNER N8 class No. 9375 at Hull Dairycotes Locomotive Depot 21 September 1947.
Type and origin
- Power type: Steam
- Designer: Thomas William Worsdell
- Builder: Darlington Works
- Build date: 1886-1890
- Total produced: 62
Specifications
- Configuration
  - Whyte: 0-6-2
- Gauge: 4 ft 8 1/2 in (1,435 mm)
- Driver dia.: 5 ft 1.25 in (1.556 m)
- Loco weight: originally 56 LT 5 cwt (57.2 t)
- Fuel type: Coal
- Boiler pressure: 160 lbf/in^{2} (1.10 MPa)
- Cylinders: Two, inside
- Cylinder size: originally 18 in × 24 in (457 mm × 610 mm)
- Valve gear: originally Joy
Performance figures
- Tractive effort: 17,265 lbf (76.80 kN)
Career
- Withdrawn: 1929-1956
- Disposition: All scrapped

The NER B and B1 Classes (later London and North Eastern Railway [LNER] Classes N8) were two classes of 0-6-2 tank locomotives designed by Thomas William Worsdell for heavy freight and mineral on the North Eastern Railway, introduced in 1886. They were tank engine versions of the NER C1 Class 0-6-0, using both simple expansion (Class B1) and also the von Borries configuration for two-cylinder compound locomotives (Class B). Both types were later rebuilt using superheated steam and the compounds were also rebuilt as simple expansion locomotives, and eventually formed a single class (albeit with variations in dimensions). Many of the superheated locomotives were also later returned to saturated steam as their original boilers wore out. As a result the classes have had a very complex mechanical history.

== B1 Class ==
The first batch of ten locomotives were built at Darlington Works between June and November 1886. They had Joy valve gear and slide valves. They were originally designated Class B, but after 1888 were designated B1 class to differentiate them from the compound locomotives. They were given numbers which filled gaps in the sequence between 14 and 1165. An eleventh locomotive of the same design (No. 74) was built at Gateshead Railway Works in March 1888 for the purposes of comparison with a compound version built two months earlier (see below under B class).

All of these locomotives were rebuilt (sometimes on more than one occasion) by Wilson Worsdell and/or Vincent Raven between 1893 and 1924. Seven of the eleven were fitted with larger 19 in × 24 in (483 mm × 610 mm) cylinders, Stephenson valve gear and piston valves, raising the weight to 57 LT 18 cwt (58.8 t). Six out of these seven were also fitted with superheating between 1919 and 1930, raising the weight to 59 LT 10 cwt (60.5 t), although in two of these cases they were returned to saturated steam in 1941 and 1944.

== B Class ==
One similar locomotive (No. 9) was constructed at Gateshead in January 1888, but fitted with the Von Borries compounding system. Its performance was tested against another new-built member of the B1 class (No.74) . As a result of these trials a further fifty were ordered., eleven of which were built at Gateshead between October and December 1888, and the remainder at Darlington between December 188 and May 1890. They were given numbers which filled gaps in the sequence between 136 and 1168.

All of these locomotives were rebuilt (sometimes on more than one occasion) by Wilson Worsdell and/or Vincent Raven between 1904 and 1911, when they were returned to simple locomotives and reclassified B1. Some members of the class retained their original 18 in × 24 in (457 mm × 610 mm) cylinders and Joy valve gear, whilst other were fitted with larger 19 in × 24 in (483 mm × 610 mm) cylinders, or 19 in × 26 in (483 mm × 660 mm) cylinders with Stephenson valve gear and piston valves. As with the other members of the B1 class many of the locomotives were with superheating between 1916 and 1927, although in several cases they were returned to saturated steam between 1941 and 1950.

All members of the B and B1 classes were reclassified as one single class N8 by the LNER (despite the variations in dimensions and valve gear. They were withdrawn between 1929 and 1956.
