= NER 1463 Class =

Class of British 2-4-0 steam locomotives

NER 1463 Class LNER Class E5
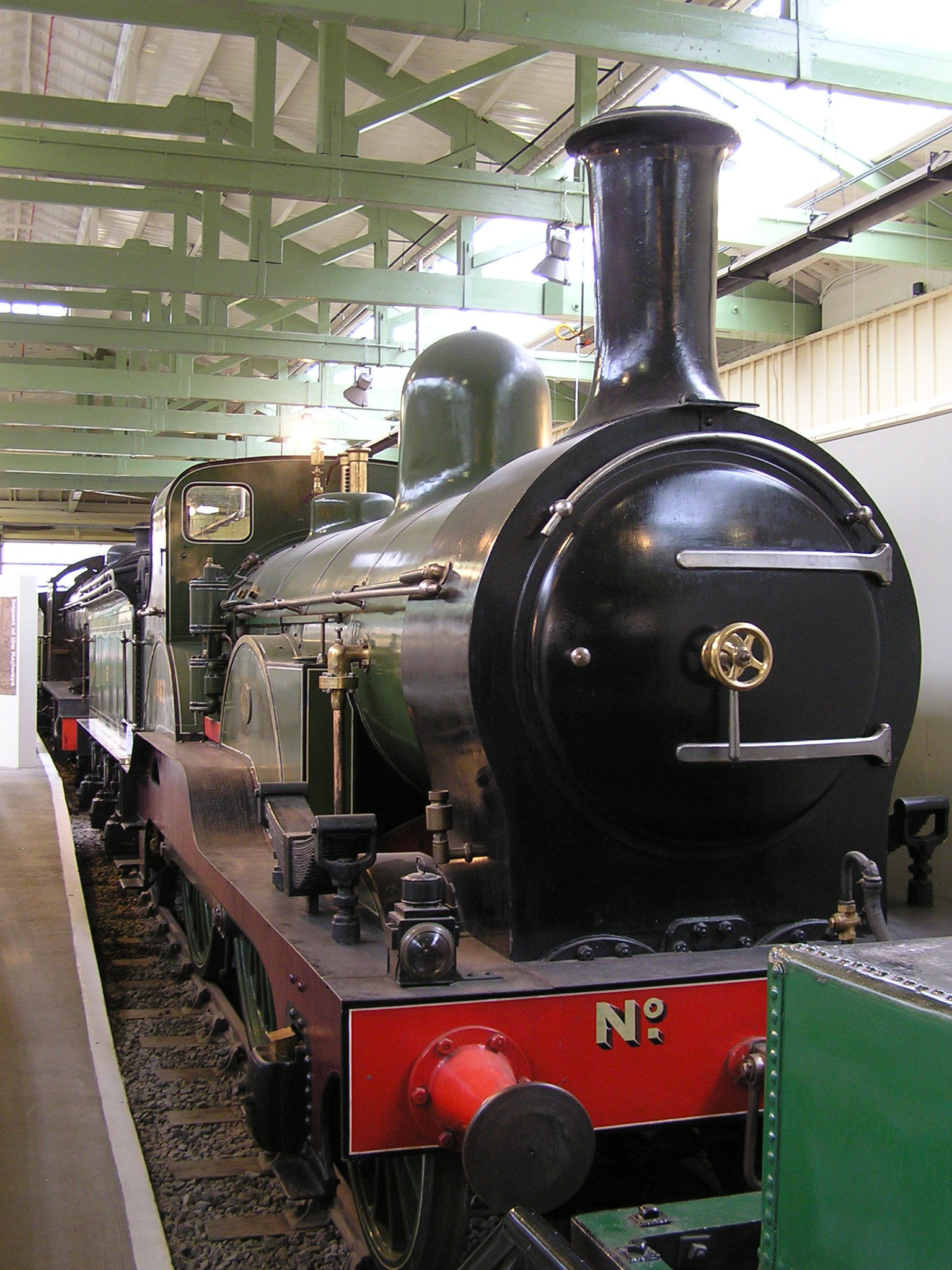
Type and origin
- Power type: Steam
- Designer: Henry Tennant
- Builder: NER Darlington (10) and Gateshead (10)
- Build date: 1885
- Total produced: 20
- Rebuild date: 1892-1896
- Number rebuilt: 20
Specifications
- Configuration
  - Whyte: 2-4-0
  - UIC: 2’B
- Gauge: Standard Gauge
- Leading dia.: 4 ft 6 in (1.37 m)
- Driver dia.: 7 ft 0 in (2.13 m)
- Wheelbase: 16 ft 8 in (5.08 m) engine 12 ft 8 in (3.86 m) tender 38 ft 7 3/4 in (11.779 m) total
- Axle load: 15.7 long tons (16.0 t)
- Loco weight: 42.1 long tons (42.8 t)
- Tender weight: 32.1 long tons (32.6 t)
- Total weight: 74.2 long tons (75.4 t)
- Fuel type: Coal
- Fuel capacity: 5 long tons 0 cwt (11,200 lb or 5.1 t)
- Water cap.: 2,651 imp gal (12,050 L; 3,184 US gal)
- Firebox
  - Grate area: 17.3 sq ft (1.61 m^{2})
- Boiler: 4 ft 3 in (1.30 m) diameter
- Boiler pressure: 140 psi (0.97 MPa); 160 psi (1.1 MPa) rebuilt
- Heating surface
  - Firebox: 107 sq ft (9.9 m^{2})
  - Tubes: 1,026 sq ft (95.3 m^{2})
  - Total surface: 1,133 sq ft (105.3 m^{2})
- Cylinders: 2 (inside)
- Cylinder size: 18 in × 24 in (460 mm × 610 mm)
- Valve gear: Stephenson
Performance figures
- Tractive effort: 12,590 lbf (56.0 kN)
Career
- Operators: North Eastern Railway; London & North Eastern Railway
- Number in class: 20
- Retired: 1926-1929
- Disposition: 1 preserved (No. 1463), 19 scrapped

The NER 1463 Class (LNER Class E5) was a class of 2-4-0 steam locomotive of the North Eastern Railway. The class was designed in 1884 by a locomotive committee, chaired by Henry Tennant, and built in 1885.

== Preservation ==
- Number 1463 is preserved at Darlington Railway Centre and Museum.

== See also ==
- Locomotives of the London and North Eastern Railway
