= NER 708 Class =

NER 708 class
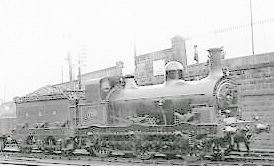
- 708 Class
Type and origin
- Power type: Steam
- Designer: Edward Fletcher
- Builder: Robert Stephenson & Co. (50); R and W Hawthorn (20)
- Serial number: RSC: 1961–1980, 2021–2050; RWH: 1521–1540
- Build date: 1870–1873
- Total produced: 70
Specifications
- Configuration
  - Whyte: 0-6-0
  - UIC: C n2
- Driver dia.: 5 ft 0 in (1,524 mm)
- Boiler: 4 ft 3 in (1.30 m) diameter
- Boiler pressure: 140 psi (0.97 MPa)
- Heating surface: 1,138 sq ft (105.7 m^{2})
- Cylinders: 2 (inside)
- Cylinder size: 17 in × 24 in (432 mm × 610 mm)
- Valve gear: Stephenson
Career
- Operators: North Eastern Railway
- Withdrawn: 1903–1911
- Disposition: all scrapped

The NER 708 Class was a class of 0-6-0 freight steam locomotive of the North Eastern Railway, designed by Edward Fletcher in 1870. A total of seventy-of the class were built for the NER.

== History ==
The NER experienced a large increase in the volume of long-distance freight traffic from Newcastle and Darlington to York and Leeds during the late 1860s. Edward Fletcher therefore introduced a class of 0-6-0 freight locomotives with outside sandwich frames for this work. These were later classified by Wilson Worsdell as the 708 class, which was the first NER class to be built in large numbers.

The first fifty locomotives were built at Newcastle by Robert Stephenson and Company (works numbers 1961–1980 and 2021–2050) between June 1870 and December 1871. These were numbered 706–755. As the class proved to be successful a further twenty were ordered from R and W Hawthorn (works numbers 1521–1540) and introduced between January 1872 and April 1873 (numbers 756–775).

During 1872, Fletcher began to build an inside framed version of the class, with the NER 398 Class. Nevertheless, the locomotives continued to provide useful service until their withdrawal between 1903 and 1911.

== Accidents and incidents ==
Two locomotives from the class suffered from boiler explosions. No. 737 in September 1879 and No. 746 in January 1880. Both locomotives were subsequently repaired and returned to service.

== Sources ==
- Baxter, Bertram (1986). Baxter, David (ed.). British Locomotive Catalogue 1825–1923, Volume 5A: North Eastern Railway, Hull and Barnsley Railway. Vol. 5A. Ashbourne, Derbyshire: Moorland Publishing Company. ISBN 0-903485-54-0.
- Nock, O.S. (1974). Locomotives of the North Eastern Railway. London: Ian Allan. ISBN 0-7110-0493-5-.
