= NER Class G =

Class of 4-4-0 steam locomotives

NER Class G LNER Class D23
Type and origin
- Power type: Steam
- Designer: Thomas William Worsdell
- Builder: NER Darlington Works
- Build date: 1887-1888
- Total produced: 20
Specifications
- Configuration
  - Whyte: 4-4-0
- Gauge: 4 ft 8 1/2 in (1,435 mm)
- Leading dia.: 3 ft 1 1/4 in (0.946 m)
- Driver dia.: 6 ft 1 1/4 in (1.861 m)
- Fuel type: coal
- Boiler: 4 ft 3 in (1.30 m) diameter
- Boiler pressure: 160 psi (1.1 MPa)
- Cylinders: two inside
- Cylinder size: 18 in × 24 in (460 mm × 610 mm)
- Valve gear: Stephenson
Performance figures
- Tractive effort: 14,437 lbf (64.22 kN)
Career
- Operators: North Eastern Railway; London and North Eastern Railway
- Withdrawn: 1929-1935
- Disposition: None preserved

The NER Class G (LNER Class D23) was a class of 2-4-0 steam locomotives of the North Eastern Railway. It was designed by Thomas William Worsdell and introduced in 1887.

== History ==
The engines were built as Class G1 2-4-0s. They had simple expansion cylinders, slide valves, and Joy valve gear. Twenty locomotives were built at Darlington Works in 1887-1888. They were initially classed as "G1" to leave the classification "G" available for a compound version. However, the compound version was not built and they were reclassified as "G" in 1914.

== Modifications ==
Between 1900 and 1904, they were rebuilt as 4-4-0s. At the same time, they were fitted with piston valves and Stephenson valve gear. Superheaters were fitted between 1913 and 1916.

== Use ==
The engines were initially used for secondary passenger duties. By the time of the 1923 Grouping, they were working local passenger services.

== Withdrawal ==
Withdrawals took place between 1929 and 1935 and none were preserved.
