= NER 1001 Class =

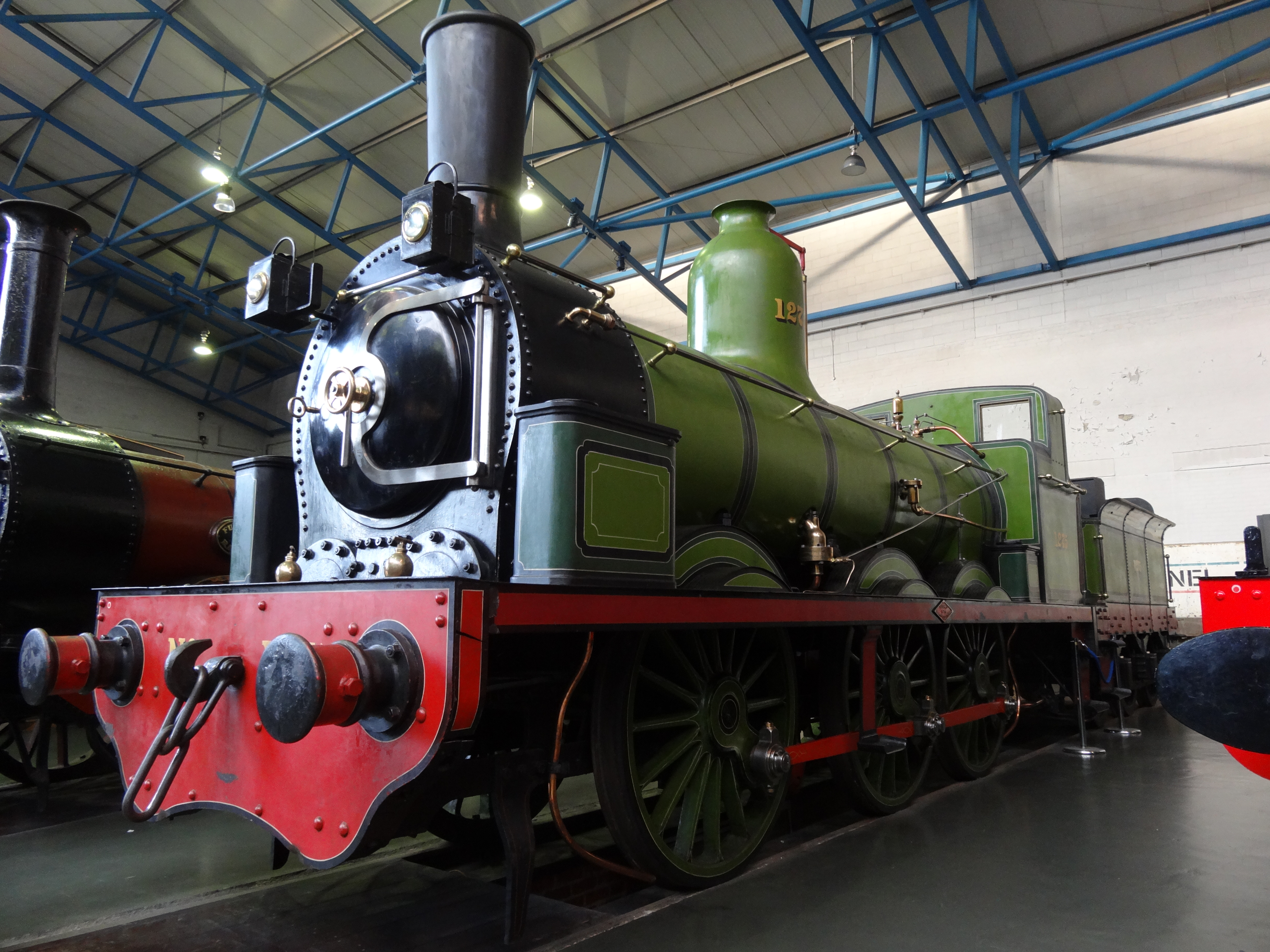
- A class 1001 locomotive preserved at the National Railway Museum
Type and origin
- Power type: Steam
- Builder: NER Darlington and Shildon
- Build date: 1852-1875
- Total produced: 192
Specifications
- Configuration
  - Whyte: 0-6-0
- Driver dia.: 5 ft 0 1/2 in (1.537 m)
- Wheelbase: 11 ft 10 in (3.61 m) locomotive 11 ft 0 in (3.35 m) tender 36 ft 2 in (11.02 m) total
- Axle load: 14.1 long tons (14.3 t; 15.8 short tons)
- Loco weight: 35.2 long tons (35.8 t; 39.4 short tons)
- Tender weight: 22.1 long tons (22.5 t; 24.8 short tons)
- Total weight: 57.3 long tons (58.2 t; 64.2 short tons)
- Fuel type: Coal
- Water cap.: 1,600 imp gal (7,300 L; 1,900 US gal)
- Firebox
  - Grate area: 13.3 sq ft (1.24 m^{2})
- Boiler: 4 ft 3 in (1.30 m) diameter
- Boiler pressure: 140 psi (0.97 MPa)
- Heating surface
  - Firebox: 92.5 sq ft (8.59 m^{2})
  - Tubes: 1,229.25 sq ft (114.201 m^{2})
  - Total surface: 1,321.75 sq ft (122.795 m^{2})
- Cylinders: 2 (inside)
- Cylinder size: 17 in × 26 in (432 mm × 660 mm)
- Valve gear: Stephenson
Performance figures
- Tractive effort: 14,750 lbf (65.6 kN)
Career
- Operators: North Eastern Railway; London & North Eastern Railway
- Retired: all retired by 1923
- Disposition: 1 preserved (No. 1275), remainder scrapped

The North Eastern Railway (NER) 1001 Class was a class of long-boiler 0-6-0 steam locomotive originally designed by William Bouch for the Stockton and Darlington Railway.

== Technical data ==
A NER 1001 class locomotive weighed about 35 long tons (36 t; 39 short tons), with a wheelbase of 11 ft 10 in (3.61 m) and 5 ft 0.5 in (1.537 m) diameter driven wheels. Its 4 ft 3 in (1.30 m) diameter boiler produced over 7 long tons (7.1 t; 7.8 short tons) of tractive effort at 140 psi (970 kPa).

== History ==
The "long boiler" design dated back to a Stephenson design of 1842. At that time there was a controversy about keeping the centre of gravity low. Another point of view was espoused by John Gray who set out to improve efficiency and increase the pressure in shorter boilers using single drivers instead of coupled wheels. His ideas led to the design of the highly successful Jenny Lind locomotive.

The long boiler design with coupled wheels continued for slower heavier work. A total of 192 NER 1001 class locomotives were built from 1852 by a number of private manufacturers, as well as the NER's own works at Darlington and Shildon.

The small size of the firebox would seem remarkable in later years, but the engines were ideal where trains might spend long periods standing, waiting for a path, or when shunting. A minimum amount of fuel would have delivered sufficient heat to the large boiler to start heavy loads.

The last ten NER 1001s were delivered in 1875. Many were rebuilt in the following twenty five years. The last was withdrawn in 1923.

Having travelled an official mileage of 908,984 miles (1,462,868 km), locomotive number 1275 is preserved at the National Railway Museum in York.

== Accidents and incidents ==
- On 5 November 1900, locomotive No. 1245 was hauling a freight train when it ran away and was derailed by trap points at Lingdale Junction, Yorkshire.
- On 8 August 1909, a locomotive of the class was hauling a freight train which was derailed at Hartley, Cumberland due to heat buckled track.
