= NER Class F =

Class of British steam locomotives

NER Class F LNER Class D22
Type and origin
- Power type: Steam
- Designer: Thomas W. Worsdell
- Build date: 1887-1891
- Total produced: 37
Specifications
- Configuration
  - Whyte: 4-4-0
- Gauge: 4 ft 8 1/2 in (1,435 mm)
- Leading dia.: 3 ft 7 1/4 in (1.099 m)
- Driver dia.: 6 ft 8 in (2.03 m)
- Fuel type: coal
- Boiler: 4 ft 6 in (1.37 m) diameter
- Boiler pressure: 160 psi (1.1 MPa)
- Cylinders: two inside
- Cylinder size: 18 in × 24 in (460 mm × 610 mm)
- Valve gear: Stephenson
Performance figures
- Tractive effort: 13,210 lbf (58.8 kN)
Career
- Operators: North Eastern Railway; London and North Eastern Railway
- Withdrawn: 1927-1935
- Disposition: None preserved

The NER Class F (LNER Class D22) was a class of 4-4-0 steam locomotives of the North Eastern Railway. It was designed by Thomas William Worsdell and introduced in 1887.

== History ==
Class F (compound expansion) and Class F1 (simple expansion) 4-4-0s were developments of T.W. Worsdell's experimental Class D 2-4-0. The Class Ds were two-cylinder compounds of the von Borries type. However, the 2-4-0 wheel arrangement was found unsuitable and this led to the development of the Class F 4–4–0.

Class	Build date	No. built
D	1886, 1888	2
F	1887	10
F1	1887	10
F	1890–1891	15
Total		37

Between 1896 and 1911 all the Class D, F and F1 locomotives were rebuilt into one 4-4-0 class with 18in x 24in simple expansion cylinders, piston valves, and Stephenson valve gear. They had been built with slide valves and Joy valve gear. The combined class was designated "Class F" from 1914. Superheaters were fitted between 1913 and 1920.

== Dimensions ==
The information box (above right) shows the dimensions after 1911. Before this, dimensions varied:

- Boiler pressure: 140, 160 or 175 psi
- Cylinders (compound): one 18 in × 24 in (460 mm × 610 mm) and one 26 in × 24 in (660 mm × 610 mm)
- Cylinders (simple): two 18 in × 24 in (460 mm × 610 mm)

== Use ==
They were initially used for express passenger services. Between 1892 and 1894 they were displaced by newer locomotives and relegated to secondary duties. By the time of the 1923 Grouping, they had been further relegated and were typically used for branch line stopping trains.

== Withdrawal ==
They were withdrawn between 1927 and 1935 and none were preserved.
