= Henry Tennant (railway administrator) =

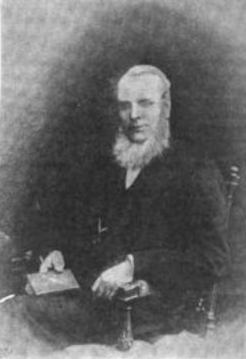
- In The Sketch, 4 March 1896
- Born: 1823; Countersett, England
- Died: 25 May 1910 (aged 86–87); York, England
- Occupation: Railway administrator
- Spouse: Mary Jane Goundry (m. 1847; died 1900)

Henry Tennant (1823–1910) was a British railway administrator. He served as general manager of the North Eastern Railway from 1870 to 1891. He was chairman of the Central London Railway from 1895 to 1898 and a director of the company after that.

== Biography ==
Henry Tennant was born in Countersett in 1823.

He married Mary Jane Goundry on 17 February 1847. She died in 1900.

He died at his home in York on 25 May 1910.

== Locomotive Committee ==
From 1884 to 1885 the North Eastern Railway was without a Locomotive Superintendent. During this period the work was done by a Locomotive Committee, chaired by Henry Tennant. The committee designed the NER 1463 Class 2-4-0 steam locomotive.
