= NER 901 Class =

Class of British steam locomotives

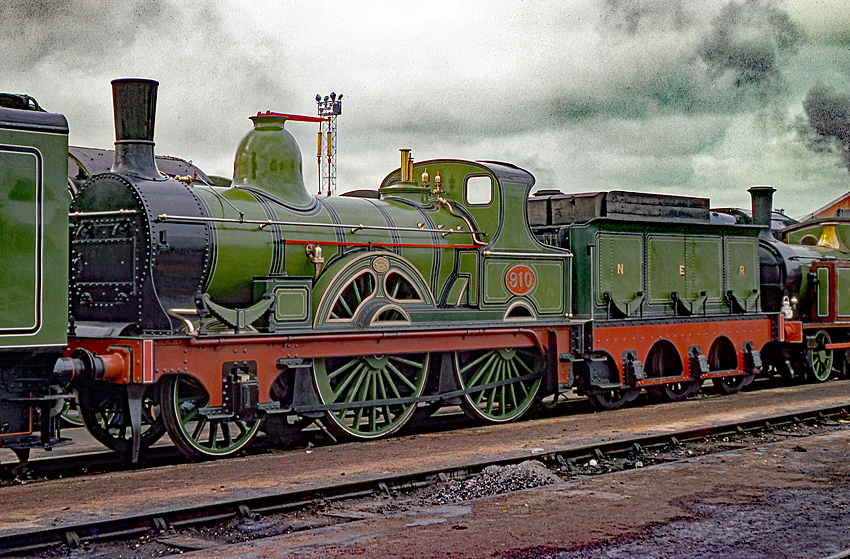
- 910 at Shildon for the S&D 150 celebrations
Type and origin
- Power type: Steam
- Build date: 1872-1882
- Total produced: 55
- Rebuild date: 1884-1885
- Number rebuilt: 55
Specifications
- Configuration
  - Whyte: 2-4-0
- Leading dia.: 4 ft 6 in (1.37 m)
- Driver dia.: 7 ft 0 in (2.13 m)
- Wheelbase: 16 ft 1 in (4.90 m) engine 12 ft 3 in (3.73 m) tender 37 ft 1 in (11.30 m) total
- Axle load: 14 long tons (14 t)
- Loco weight: 39.7 long tons (40.3 t)
- Tender weight: 29.4 long tons (29.9 t)
- Total weight: 69.6 long tons (70.7 t)
- Firebox
  - Grate area: 15.6 sq ft (1.45 m^{2})
- Boiler: 4 ft 3 in (1.30 m) diameter
- Boiler pressure: 160 psi (1.1 MPa)
- Heating surface
  - Firebox: 98 sq ft (9.1 m^{2})
  - Tubes: 995 sq ft (92.4 m^{2})
  - Total surface: 1,093 sq ft (101.5 m^{2})
- Cylinders: 2 (inside)
- Cylinder size: 17 in × 24 in (430 mm × 610 mm) or 17 1/2 in × 24 in (440 mm × 610 mm); 18 in × 24 in (460 mm × 610 mm) rebuilt
- Valve gear: Stephenson
- Valve type: Slide valves
Performance figures
- Tractive effort: 12,590 lbf (56.0 kN)
Career
- Operators: North Eastern Railway; London & North Eastern Railway
- Retired: 1912 - 1925
- Disposition: 1 preserved (No. 910), remainder scrapped

The NER 901 Class was a class of 2-4-0 steam locomotive of the North Eastern Railway, designed by Edward Fletcher. Between 1872 and 1882 55 of the class were built for the NER.

== History ==
From their introduction, the 901 Class were used on the Newcastle-Edinburgh and Newcastle-York runs, hauling 160–170 tonnes (160–170 long tons; 180–190 short tons) loads. During 1884, engines based at Gateshead depot averaged 4,400 miles (7,100 kilometres) per month. Apart from minor instances of updating, only two of the class underwent extensive rebuilding. More substantial modifications were made to the last of the Neilson-built engines, No. 933, which, in 1907, was not only reboilered but converted into a 4-4-0. She was scrapped in 1914, one of 29 of the class withdrawn between 1913 and 1914. But for the onset of the first World War, the rest of the class would have followed suit. Instead the curtailing of new construction led to a shortage of motive power and new work was found for the 901 Class. Some were drafted on to the coastal line between Scarborough and Bridlington but the majority were stationed at Darlington. From here they worked passenger services over the Stainmore route to Kirkby Stephen, Penrith and Tebay. Darlington also kept them on as pilots.

By 1923 only ten of the class remained and the now preserved No.910 was amongst the final five to be withdrawn from service. 910 was displayed by the NER when new at the 50th anniversary of Steam on the Stockton and Darlington railway in 1875, by the LNER at the 100th anniversary in 1925, and again by British Railways at the 150th anniversary in 1975.

== Accidents and incidents ==
- On 25 March 1877, locomotive No. 901 was hauling an express passenger train which was derailed at Morpeth, Northumberland due to excessive speed on a curve. Five people were killed and seventeen were injured.
- On 4 October 1894, locomotive No. 904 was one of two locomotives hauling a sleeping car train which overran signals and collided with a freight train that was being shunted at Castle Hills, Yorkshire. One person was killed.

== Preservation ==
Number 910 is preserved by the National Railway Museum. It was moved to the Stainmore Railway Company at Kirkby Stephen East station in 2011 for the Stainmore 150 celebrations housed in the Darlington train shed of the main station building. By January 2025 the loco had been relocated to Locomotion Museum in Shildon, for cosmetic restoration ahead of the Rail200 celebrations.
