= NER Class T3 =

Class of British steam locomotives (1919–1924)

NER class T3
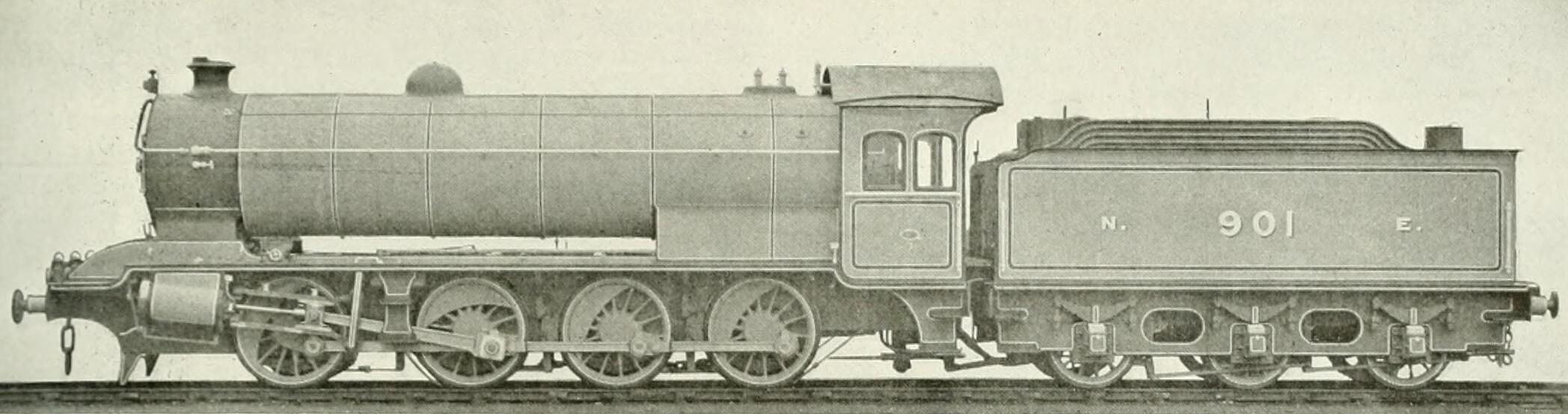
- Works photo of No. 901
Type and origin
- Power type: Steam
- Designer: Vincent Raven
- Builder: Darlington Works
- Build date: 1919 and 1924
- Total produced: 15
Specifications
- Configuration
  - Whyte: 0-8-0
- Gauge: 4 ft 8 1/2 in (1,435 mm) standard gauge
- Driver dia.: 4 ft 7 1/4 in (1.403 m)
- Loco weight: 71.6 long tons (72.7 t; 80.2 short tons)
- Tender weight: 44.1 long tons (44.8 t; 49.4 short tons)
- Fuel type: Coal
- Fuel capacity: 5 long tons 10 cwt (12,300 lb or 5.6 t)
- Water cap.: 4,125 imp gal (18,750 L; 4,954 US gal)
- Boiler pressure: 180 psi (1.24 MPa)
- Cylinders: 3
- Cylinder size: 18 1/2 in × 26 in (470 mm × 660 mm)
Performance figures
- Tractive effort: 36,965 lbf (164.43 kN)
Career
- Operators: NER, LNER, BR
- Class: T3, LNER Class Q7
- Power class: BR: 7F
- Withdrawn: 1954-1962
- Disposition: One preserved, remainder scrapped

The North Eastern Railway Class T3, classified as Class Q7 by the LNER, is a class of 0-8-0 steam locomotive designed for heavy freight. Five were built by the NER in 1919 and a further 10 by the London and North Eastern Railway (LNER) in 1924.

== Performance ==
The first of the T3s, No.901 was outshopped from Darlington Works in November 1919. A month later the NER organised a test train, over the Newcastle to Carlisle line, including a brake van and the company's dynamometer car to record the locomotive's performance. No.901 had 1,402 long tons (1,424 t; 1,570 short tons) in tow but handled the load with ease, registering both high power and steady acceleration. There were no problems starting on a 1 in 298 (0.335 %) grade and on the return, with a reduced load of 787 long tons (800 t; 881 short tons), the engine was untroubled by gradients as severe as 1 in 107 (0.93%).

== LNER ==
Despite their prowess, the original quintet of T3s was not augmented by the North Eastern Railway, a move that would have pleased footplate crews who disliked having to lubricate and maintain the centre cylinder and valve gear. Instead the enlargement of the class came under the LNER, which authorised the construction of ten additional T3s and these emerged from Darlington Works during 1924.

Of the new engines two were allocated to York and a further four went to Hull. The remaining four gravitated to their natural habitat, Tyne Dock depot near South Shields. It was there eventually that all 15 T3s/Q7s congregated. Here they performed the role they were designed for. This was to haul 700-long-ton (710 t; 780-short-ton) rakes of iron ore hoppers to the steelworks at Consett 1,000 ft (305 m) above sea level. On the steepest section, as severe as 1 in 35 (2.86%) in places, one 0-8-0 pulled while another pushed.

== British Railways ==
All 15 passed into British Railways ownership in 1948 and they were numbered 63460-63474. They remained master of their task till the arrival of BR Standard Class 9F 2-10-0s in the 1950s. With the loss of their bread and butter work British Railways retired all 15 of the Q7s in November and December 1962.

== Preservation ==
One, NER 901 (BR 63460) has survived and is currently on display at Darlington Railway Centre and Museum. It is the newest exhibit at the museum.

== Models ==
DJH Models has made a kit for 1:76 (OO gauge) of the class
