= Edward Fletcher (engineer) =

English railway engineer

- Born: 1807; Elsdon, Northumberland, England
- Died: 21 December 1889 (aged 81–82)
- Occupation: locomotive engineer

Edward Fletcher (1807 – 21 December 1889) was an English engineer, and locomotive superintendent of the North Eastern Railway (NER). He was born at Elsdon in Northumberland.

== Career ==
He was apprenticed to George Stephenson beginning in 1825 and helped with the construction of Stephenson's Rocket and the Canterbury and Whitstable Railway. He helped with the construction of the York and North Midland Railway, and then became locomotive superintendent of the Newcastle and Darlington Junction Railway in 1845. When the N&DJR became part of the North Eastern Railway in 1854, Fletcher became its locomotive superintendent until his retirement in 1882. He was succeeded by Alexander McDonnell.

== Locomotive designs ==
Fletcher's locomotive designs for the North Eastern Railway included:

- NER Bogie Tank Passenger
- NER 901 Class 2-4-0
- NER 1001 Class 0-6-0

== Family ==
His nephew was the engineer James Holden.

== See also ==
- Locomotives of the North Eastern Railway

Business positions
New title First Loco Supt of NER	Locomotive Superintendent of the North Eastern Railway; 1854-1882	Succeeded by Alexander McDonnell
