= Gateshead TMD =

Locomotive maintenance yard in the North of England

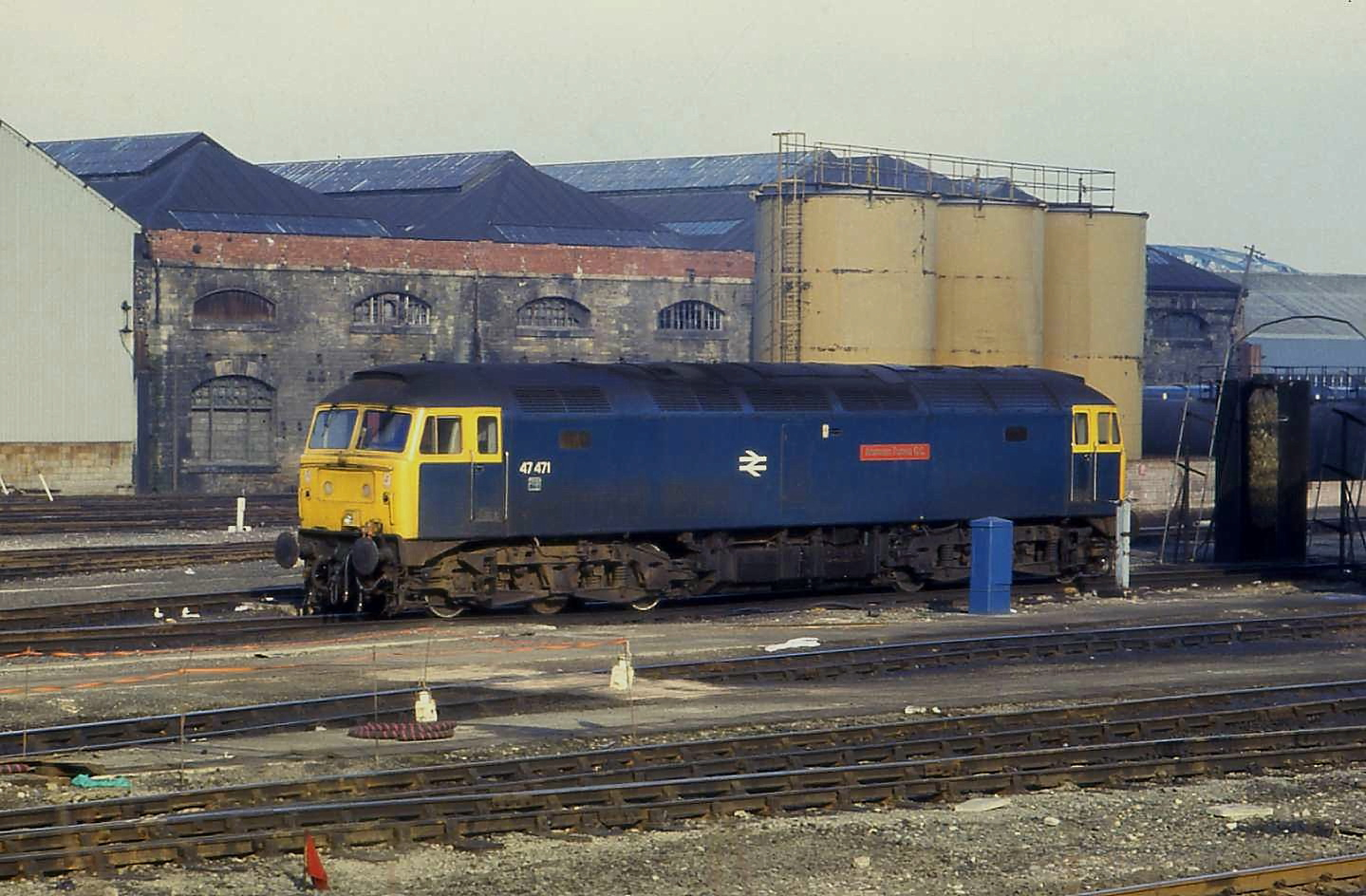
- 47471 at Gateshead TMD
- Interactive map of Gateshead TMD

Location
- Location: Gateshead, United Kingdom
- Coordinates: 54.9637°N 1.6104°W
- OS grid: NZ249633

Characteristics
- Owner: British Rail
- Depot code: 52A (1948-1973); GD (1973-1991)
- Type: Diesel

History
- Closed: 1991
- Original: NER
- Pre-grouping: LNER
- Post-grouping: British Railways

Gateshead TMD was a railway traction maintenance depot situated in Gateshead, England. The depot code was 52A during the steam era and GD later on.

It was known, along with the adjacent locomotive works, as Greenesfield or Greensfield, after a Mr. Greene, from whom the North Eastern Railway (NER) bought the land. It was built in 1844 as a passenger railway station and in 1854 it became instead the locomotive repair works for the NER. In 1909, the locomotive works at Greenesfield was the largest single employer in Gateshead with over 3,300 workers

In 1958, all BR locomotive depots on Tyneside, Wearside and in Northumberland became sub-sheds of Gateshead.

The depot closed in 1991.

Housing now occupies the site, now known as Ochre Yards. The street names reflect the site's history, with Worsdell Drive and Fletcher Road named after former locomotive superintendents of the NER.

== Engine shed and infrastructure ==
The main shed housed four turntables for most of its working life. Prior to 1908, all four turntables had been 48' 5", which proved to be a problem as locomotives were steadily increasing in size. However, in that same year, the Redheugh Incline was closed, thereby allowing the track running alongside the southern wall of the shed to be lifted, and an extension built to accommodate three larger 60' 0" turntables .

In the 1920s, the arrival of large 4-6-2 "pacific" type locomotives (the Vincent Raven designed NER "2400" class which became "A2" under the LNER, and the Doncaster built Gresley "A1s" designed for the GNR), necessitated converting the adjoining locomotive works' tender shop into a shed which could accommodate them, as even the 60' turntables in the main shed were not large enough. The problem of turning these locomotives without a large enough turntable was overcome by utilising the triangular junctions at the southern ends of the High Level and King Edward VII bridges, which allowed the locomotives to perform a three-point turn in much the same way as a road vehicle. The rebuilding of the shed in the 1950s would include the provision of a 70' turntable which these locomotives could use, but this would soon become obsolete with the phasing out of steam traction under the BR 1955 Modernisation Plan.

After the steam locomotives departed, the main shed at Gateshead was converted into a five-road straight shed, in which various diesels were stored and maintained. The conversion drastically altered the depot, as coaling stages and similar steam engine infrastructure gave way to diesel-related infrastructure, such as fuel tanks. One exception was one of the two water towers, which would remain until closure. Unlike its counterpart which vanished with the steam locomotives, and consisted of a tank on top of its own substantial brick structure in the yard to the South of the shed itself, this sat on the roof at the northwestern corner of the building and thus would have presented no obstruction to any reorganisation of the external trackwork..

=== Sub-Sheds in BR steam days ===
Gateshead had several sub-sheds, some of which had sub-sheds of their own. When Sunderland (which was formerly 54A) became a sub-shed of Gateshead, it, along with its own sub-sheds, received new codes with Gateshead's 52 prefix.

==== 52B Heaton ====
This shed was allocated similar types of east coast main line (ECML) locomotives as Gateshead. Heaton had (and still has) extensive carriage sidings. It would also encompass South Gosforth Car Sheds, where the Tyneside electric stock was stabled, including the NER Class ES1 shunting locomotives for the steeply graded Quayside Branch. Heaton and South Gosforth are the only surviving former sub-sheds of Gateshead; all of the others listed here are now closed.

Heaton carriage sidings' ability to accommodate the fixed rakes of carriages, power unit and driving van trailer of an HST played a major role in the decision to close Gateshead, whose cramped location between Askew Road and the Tyne offered limited scope for expansion. This was effectively the same reason that Darlington replaced Gateshead as the location of the NER's main works.

==== 52C Blaydon ====
Which, by 1955, also included Hexham and Alston.

==== 52D Tweedmouth ====
The northernmost extent of Gateshead's control, which included the shed at Alnmouth.

==== 52E Percy Main ====
Allocated locomotives for use on the former Blyth & Tyne lines in South-East Northumberland.

==== 52F North and South Blyth ====
Allocated locomotives mainly for use on the heavy mineral traffic in the Northumberland coalfield, North Blyth was at Cambois, and was later replaced by an entirely new diesel depot (Blyth Cambois TMD). The new depot closed in 1994.

==== 52G Sunderland ====
(54A until 1958) - last MPD in the region with an allocation of steam locomotives, with the last examples leaving in 1967. Also included Durham, which did not have a BR shed code.

==== 52H Tyne Dock ====
(54B until 1958) - provided motive power for freight workings on South Tyneside, including the iron ore workings to Consett. Also encompassed Pelton Level MPD near Stanley.

==== 52J Borough Gardens ====
(54C until 1958) - a quadruple roundhouse which after closure and demolition later became the site of Park Lane Goods Depot. An idea of the volume of freight - particularly coal - traffic once handled within a relatively small geographical area by Gateshead, Sunderland and their various sub-sheds can be gained from their 1950 locomotive allocations with no less than 59 Q5, Q6 and Q7 0-8-0s for heavy mineral workings (Borough Gardens alone had 22) along with almost 200 assorted 0-6-0s.

==== 52K Consett ====
(54D until 1958) - provided facilities for locomotives working the lines in and out of Consett, (only the former Stanhope & Tyne route remaining for traffic to and from the steelworks by 1980, when the plant finally closed) as well as being allocated snowploughs which were essential in winter due to the town's location being a high fell on the edge of the Pennines.

== Locomotives ==
=== Steam ===
The shed was home to numerous express locomotives, such as the 35 pacifics allocated in 1954. Newcastle Central station pilots and various other smaller locomotives for local passenger trains and goods workings were also based at the depot.

The experimental water-tube boilered "W1" 4-6-4 No. 10000, which became known as the "hush-hush" due to the secrecy surrounding its construction, was also stabled at Gateshead before being converted into a more conventional locomotive.

In BR days, the shed continued to house mainly ex-NER/LNER locomotives, the BR standard classes being somewhat conspicuous by their absence from north east lines (one exception being a modified batch of the massive "9Fs" which had been specially fitted with large Westinghouse air pumps; these locomotives were stabled at Tyne Dock shed and employed on the heavy iron ore trains to Consett Steelworks where the pumps were needed to operate the air powered doors on the large bogie ore hoppers).

Gateshead also provided motive power for Dunston Staithes, to the West, which had restrictions in place regarding locomotives that could work on them, these being, in LNER and BR days, J71 and J72 0-6-0 tanks and a pair of Y3 sentinel geared locomotives affectionately known as "pups". The 0-6-0 tanks propelled loaded trains out of the Norwood Coal Yard onto the top of the staithes where the waiting pups shunted the wagons into position above the loading chutes, while the empties rolled back off under gravity and would be collected for their journey back to the colliery by one of Blaydon or Borough Gardens' stable of 0-6-0 and 0-8-0 mineral engines.

Bowes Bridge, which never had its own shed code, was also a sub-shed of Gateshead and was allocated a pair of N10 0-6-2 tanks for working the sections of the Tanfield Branch level enough not to require rope haulage. Despite the absence of tender engines, Bowes Bridge was still equipped with a turntable, allowing the locomotives to always navigate the rope-worked sections with their fireboxes on the downhill side, these being sufficiently steep that running with the firebox on the uphill side would drain water to the front of the boiler and expose the crown sheet to excessive heat. The turntable pit and coaling stage are still in existence and visible from passing trains on the Tanfield Railway although the shed itself is long gone, motive power now coming via a connection to the former Bowes Railway/NCB Marley Hill shed a short distance to the south.

The last of Gateshead's steam allocation left in October 1965, with steam lingering on in a revenue-earning capacity in the north east at Sunderland MPD, a handful of industrial locations and NCB lines for a few years before being phased out altogether (although it never completely disappeared from the region, the Tanfield Railway having reopened as a preservation centre just before the last survivors of the NCB steam fleet were retired).

=== Diesel ===
Diesels on shed included the following:

- Class 03 shunters
- Class 08 shunters
- Class 25
- Class 45 "peaks"
- Class 46 "peaks"
- Class 47/4s used on Trans-Pennine services
- Class 55 "Deltics" used on East Coast Main Line expresses.
- Class 56

After closure in 1991, the depot stood for a number of years until its last remaining resident, 08 618 (which had been loitering in the shed since being withdrawn in February 1990), was sold for scrap to TJ Thomson of Stockton-on-Tees, and cut up on site in February 2001, just before most of the buildings were demolished.

== Gateshead Railway Works ==
Gateshead was, before 1910, the NER's locomotive department headquarters and main works. Part of the works occupied the former site of the original Gateshead Station, where trains from London terminated until the High Level Bridge and Newcastle Central Station opened. Gateshead Station's train shed subsequently became the works' No. 1 erecting shop (where the final assembly of the locomotives was carried out), and the hotel adjoining the station became offices.

On the opposite side of the running lines, at the Eastern end of Chater's Bank sidings, a roundhouse built sometime between 1895 and 1898 served as the works' paint shop. By 1957, this was marked on the OS map as an engine shed, which suggests that locomotives from the soon to be closed Borough Gardens MPD had been transferred to Gateshead. The roundhouse is not present on OS maps from the 1960s onwards, but is visible in a video of BR freight workings in 1983 (also visible in this video is the Gateshead Breakdown Train, the new Redheugh Bridge and its soon to be dismantled predecessor, with the similarly doomed chimneys of Dunston Power Station in the background).

Locomotive production at Gateshead ceased in 1910, when production was switched to Darlington. However, the works continued to maintain and overhaul engines until they closed in 1932.

The works re-opened during the Second World War to ease the pressure on Darlington for maintaining and overhauling locomotives. A new 60-ton crane was installed during this time. The works remained open until 1959, when they closed for the last time.

In 1996, part of the former works was used as an exhibition space for Antony Gormley's "Field for the British Isles", consisting of 40,000 small terracotta figures.

Most of the works was demolished in 2002, along with the adjacent engine sheds, although some of the buildings nearest the river have survived and have been converted into apartments.

== Remaining railway activity ==
The only remaining railway activity consists of Network Rail offices and the Tyneside IECC by the King Edward VII Bridge approach lines at the west of the site, which controls train movements on the East Coast Main Line between Northallerton and Morpeth. The line between the south end of the bridges also remains open, allowing freight trains access from the ECML and Newcastle-Carlisle route to Tyne Dock. Grand Central services from Newcastle to London via Sunderland and Middlesbrough also use this line, with only local passenger services now crossing the Tyne via the High Level Bridge.

Most other TMDs in the area have also closed, mainly due to decreased goods and mineral traffic in the latter half of the 20th century. Only Heaton TMD and South Gosforth TMD (now used for maintaining the Tyne & Wear Metrocars) remain in operation, although the Tyne Yard at Lamesley retains some facilities for freight locomotives.

== Surviving Related Buildings ==
Gateshead Railway Club, opposite the former entrance to Gateshead station (now Aligeez pizza shop), near the southern end of the High Level Bridge has survived, and The Central bar on the opposite side of the viaduct carrying the line to Sunderland has memorabilia relating to the area's railway history on the walls, including some Gateshead (52A) shed plates from a steam locomotive.

== Sources ==
- Taylor, Simon; Lovie, David B (2004). Gateshead. Architecture in a changing English urban landscape. London: English Heritage. ISBN 1 873592 76 0.
