= Darlington Works =

Railway Engineering Works

Coordinates: 54.53802°N 1.55488°W

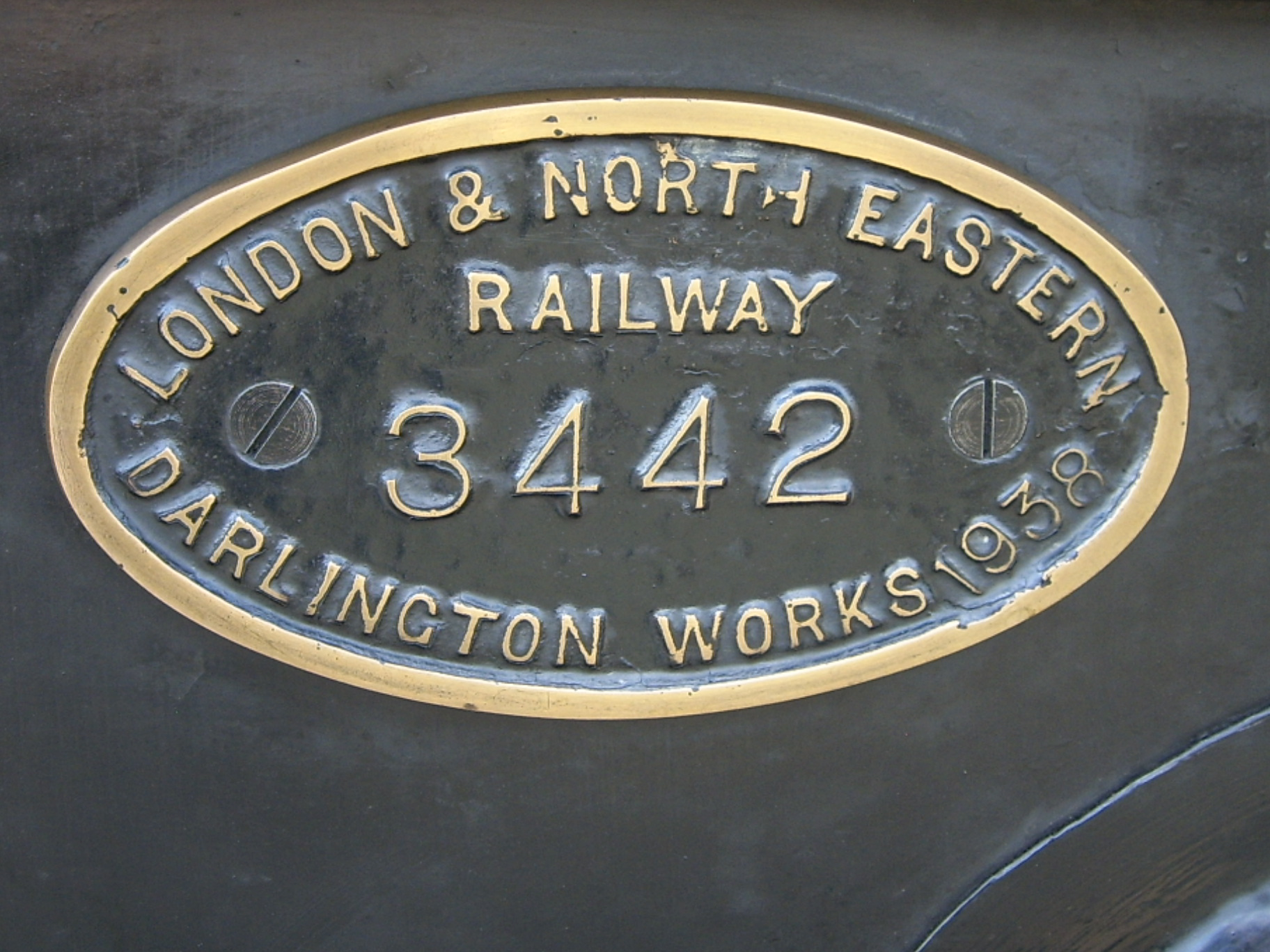
Darlington Works plate of 1938 on K4 2-6-0 3442 (61994) The Great Marquess, April 2009

Darlington Works was established in 1863 by the Stockton and Darlington Railway in the town of Darlington in the north east of England. The main part of the works, the North Road Shops was located on the northeast side of the Stockton and Darlington Railway (now part of the Tees Valley Line)

== History ==
=== NER period ===
The first new locomotive was built at the works in 1864. Though the railway had amalgamated with the North Eastern Railway (NER) in 1863, it continued to build its own designs for a number of years. In 1877, the first North Eastern designs appeared.

Additionally works (paint and boiler shop) were constructed west of the S&DR railway in the Stooperdale area of Darlington. Grandiose offices for the NER were also constructed in the Stooperdale area in 1911, to the design of William Bell. The offices were used by NER chief mechanical engineer Vincent Raven until 1917.

In 1914, a class of NER Bo-Bo electric locomotives was built at the works to run between Shildon and Newport. Ten of these 1,500 volt direct current locomotives were completed.

Sir Vincent Raven designed the NER Class T2 0-8-0 freight locomotive in 1913, and by 1921 the works had built 120 of the engines, which were later designated Q6 by the LNER. The heavier and more powerful Raven NER Class T3 0-8-0 (LNER Q7) followed in 1919, 15 engines being completed by 1924.

=== LNER period ===
Under the LNER it continued to play a major role, producing a new engine each week, with Gresley's K3 class 2-6-0 appearing in 1924. Both the class V2 and A1 express locomotives were also built. By 1927 the works was the town's largest employer.

Darlington Works built six LNER Class K4 2-6-0 locomotives in 1937/38 for operation on the West Highland Line. No. 3442 (later 61994) The Great Marquess has been preserved in full working order and in 2009 was still hauling special steam trains on the UK main line network.

=== British Railways period ===
After nationalisation, Darlington built both steam and diesel locomotives, including BR standard class 2. The equivalent of the NER Class E1 (LNER J72) 0-6-0 tank locomotive had been built, virtually unchanged since 1898. In 1954 during the modernisation of British Railways the works was enlarged and had grown to cover over 238,000 square feet (22,100 m^{2}), but in 1962 the BR Workshops Division was formed and, with rationalisation, the works was run down and closed in 1966.

The land of the Stooperdale part of the works was sold to Whessoe in 1962.

== Current use of the site ==
The site, since about 1979/80, has been occupied by a Morrisons supermarket. The adjacent Bowls Hall, with the original clock which was restored, was re-erected by contractors Fairclough Building Ltd onto the east wall of the supermarket overhanging North Road.

The Stooperdale offices were grade II listed in 2001.

== Gallery ==
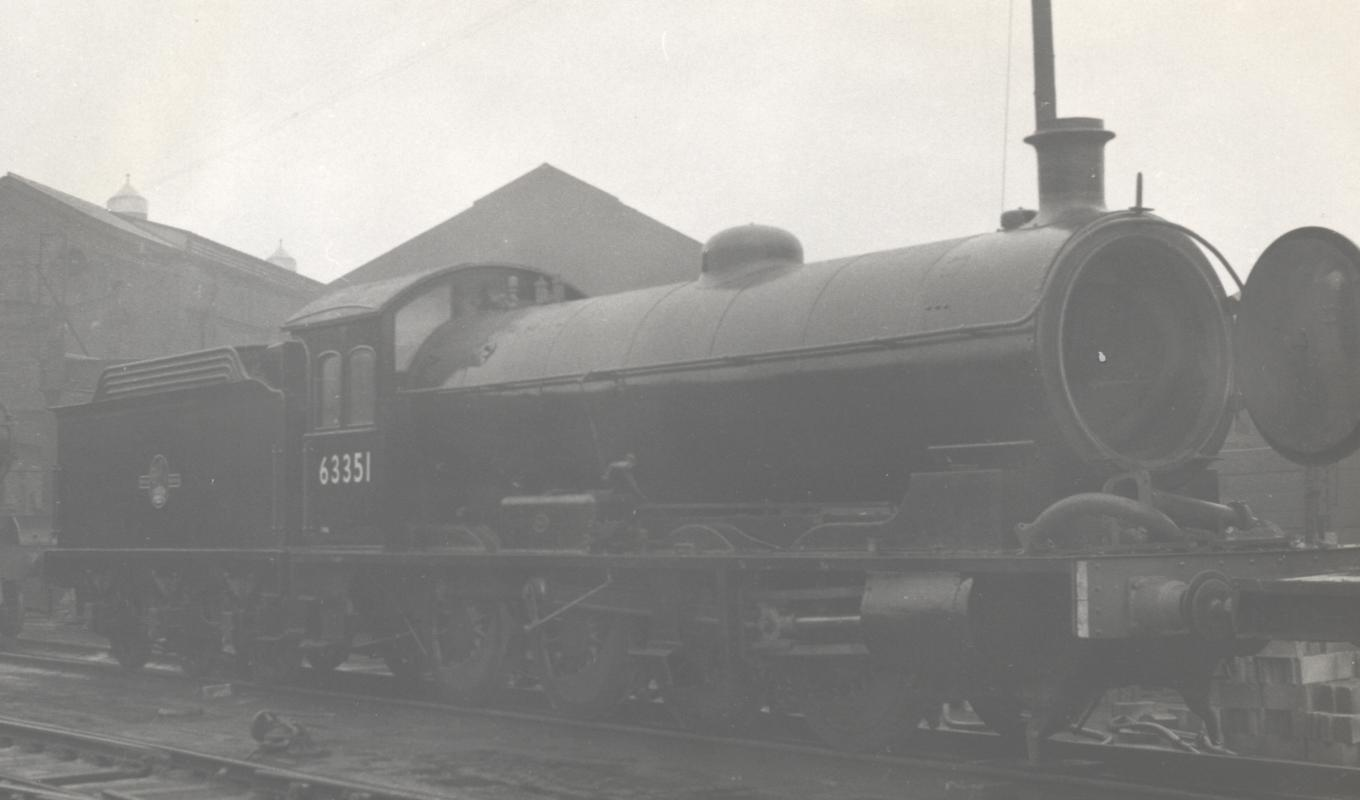
NER T2 (LNER Q6) built at Darlington in 1918, after overhaul at the works on 22 March 1959

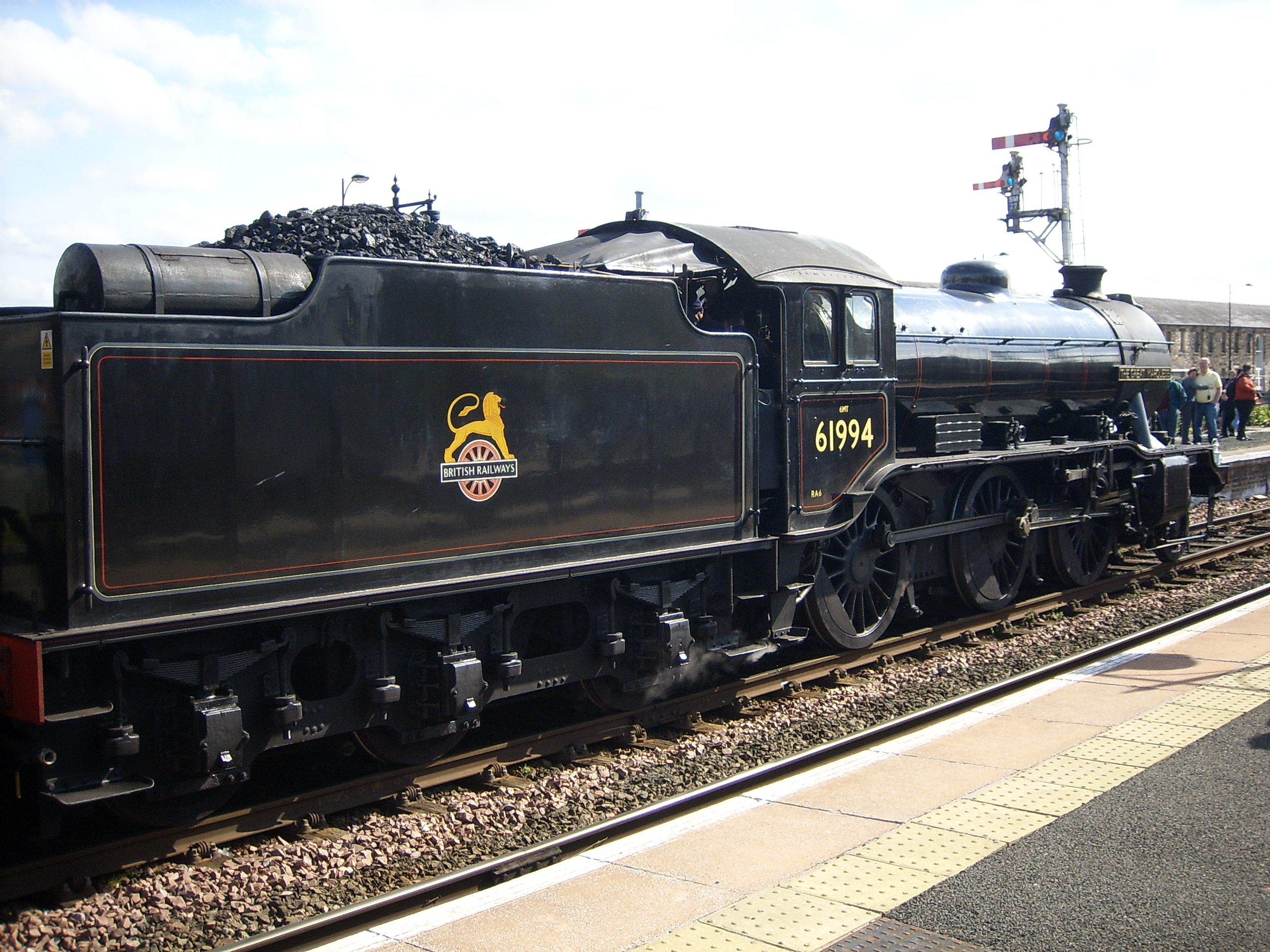
LNER K4 61994 The Great Marquess built at Darlington Works in 1938 (preserved 2009)

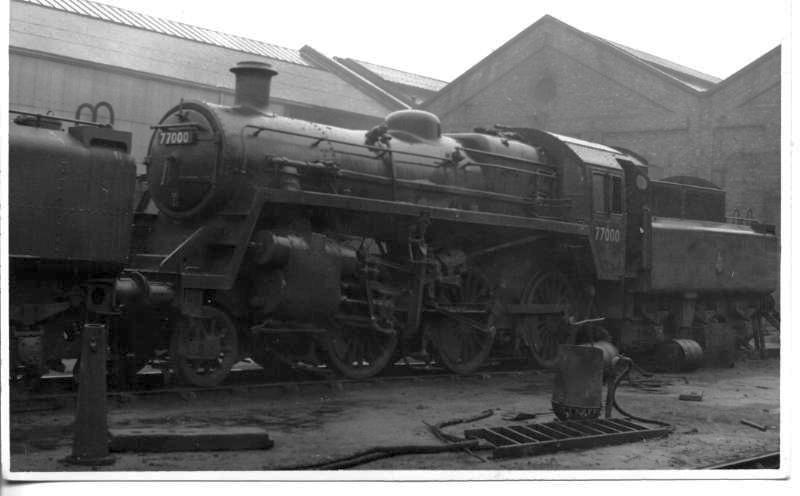
BR Standard Class 3 2-6-0 77000 at Darlington Works (1959)

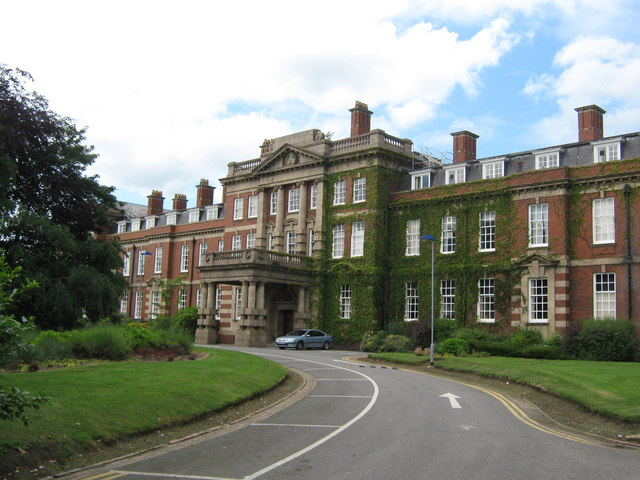
Stooperdale Offices Darlington (2009)

== See also ==
- Stockton and Darlington Railway Carriage Works, also known as Hopetown works
- Darlington TMD
- Billingham Manufacturing Plant
- Bowesfield Works
- Teesside Steelworks
