= Wistow railway station =

Former railway station in North Yorkshire, England

Wistow

General information
- Location: Wistow, North Yorkshire; England
- Coordinates: 53.8122°N 1.1087°W
- Grid reference: SE 587 354
- Platforms: 1

Other information
- Status: Disused

History
- Original company: Cawood, Wistow and Selby Light Railway
- Pre-grouping: NER
- Post-grouping: LNER; BR(NE)

Key dates
- 16 February 1898.: Opened
- 1 January 1930: Closed to passengers
- 2 May 1960: Closed completely
Location

Wistow was the sole intermediate station of the short Cawood, Wistow and Selby Light Railway (CW&SLR), in rural North Yorkshire, England. The line was connected to the North Eastern Railway (NER) at its southern end.

== The station buildings ==
The line originally had three stations, Selby (Brayton Gates), Wistow and Cawood. The Brayton Gates terminus was temporary and probably wooden. It closed in 1904 when trains were diverted to the NER's main Selby station. Cawood's and Wistow's permanent, brick-built station buildings were similar, but clearly differed from the NER's typical rural station. The main difference between the two was that Wistow station building stood alongside the platform, parallel to the track, whilst the Cawood building stood at right angles to it. In 1899 the company obtained parliamentary approval to build an extension to Church Fenton; this never happened, but had it done so the Cawood station building would have had to be demolished or bypassed.

Wistow station's passenger provision was unexceptional for a small rural station in a medium-sized village with a rural hinterland. The goods provision was more generous, in particular it featured a long loading platform of varying height to facilitate loading and unloading, especially during the "Campaign", i.e. harvest period for crops such as potatoes and beet. "Campaigns" could lead to trains of 40 wagons, especially before the Second World War.

== Station masters ==
Wistow had two station masters in its first three years - Messrs Hawmby and Bains. Mr Bailey then took charge until he retired about 1936. Mr Harry Oldfield was responsible for both Cawood and Wistow from then until closure.

== The line and traffic ==
The line had an exceptionally low route availability of "two". Operators could easily supply very light goods engines which did not need continuous brakes, but had precious few very light passenger locomotives. The founding company hired a loco - "Cawood" - and two coaches specifically for the job. When the NER took over they modified at least one steam locomotive for the line. In the Edwardian period the NER developed a pioneering pair of Petrol-electric Autocars which were sent to Selby in 1908 to run the Cawood service, among others.

The autocars ceased working the line in the early 1920s, when it reverted to steam haulage, with trains composed of a single "Bogie Brake third" coach worked by a NER Class E 0-6-0T or, occasionally, BTP 0-4-4T No. 189.

On 9 July 1923 a quite different form of internal combustion-powered provision was deployed on some services in the form of the unique "Leyland" petrol railbus, a converted 26-seater NER road bus of conventional appearance for the period. This ran a wide-ranging diagram including the Cawood branch which came to a sudden end on 11 November 1926 when the railbus was destroyed by fire while refuelling at Selby.

On 1 May 1928 Selby received its first Sentinel steam railcars. No. 220 "Water Witch" may have been the first to work to Cawood, but it was destroyed in a collision near Doncaster on 9 June 1929. Better remembered were two similar cars, No. 225 "True Blue" and No. 273 "Trafalgar" which worked the branch until the last passenger service on Saturday 30 December 1929. Occasional special passenger trains, such as excursions to pantomimes in Leeds, used the line until 1946.

After the end of passenger services the line went into steady decline in the face of road competition, which accelerated after the Second World War. A handful of ancient 0-6-0Ts were regularly in charge, notably J71s 68285 and 68286 and veteran "Ironclad" J77 68406, with a J72 appearing more often in the late 1950s. Selby locoshed closed in September 1959, after which the occasional "flyweight" freights were usually hauled by a Class 03 diesel shunter.

== Passenger services ==
The line's initial passenger timetable provided five trains a day, Monday to Saturday, plying between "Selby" (i.e. Selby (Brayton Gates)) Wistow and Cawood. The journey time was 17 minutes. By July 1899 the timings had been adjusted and one train had been removed on Tuesdays to Saturdays. On Monday - Selby's Market Day - an extra train was provided out and back mid-morning and an extra from Brayton Gates at teatime, which returned empty. By 1910 the unbalanced teatime Market Train had been withdrawn and timings had been adjusted, but the pattern of four a day plus a Market Day extra remained, with the added benefit that the first train from Cawood in the morning ran through to York. The journey time remained 17 minutes despite the extra mile to reach Selby's main station instead of Brayton Gates.

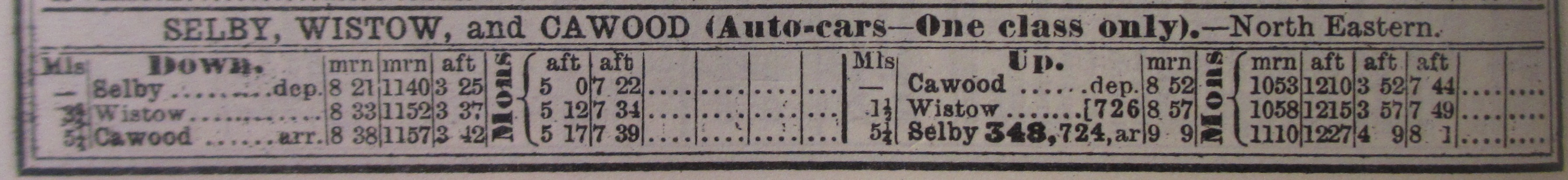
April 1910 Railway timetable

By 1914 there were two Market Day extras and four daily trains, but by 1923, whilst the Market Day extras remained, only two daily trains survived, morning and mid-evening.

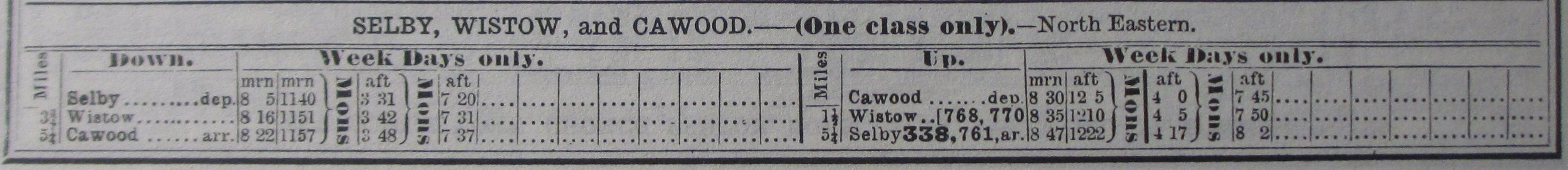
July 1923 Railway timetable

A "Farewell" railtour ran on 22 April 1960 using two brake vans. The line closed on 2 May 1960.The very last train, sent out to collect a stranded van and Cawood station's office equipment, ran on 23 May 1960, hauled by a diesel shunter. As a boy, Wistow's Mr John Woodall had travelled on the first train in 1898, British Railways agreed to his request to travel in the guard's van of this final trip.

== After closure ==
The track was lifted and the Selby Dam bridge was demolished by contractors in 1961, using road vehicles. Cawood station has been demolished, Wistow station remains as a private residence. The engine shed at Brayton Gates was used by railwaymen's mutual improvement classes for many years, but was demolished in 1963. By 2010 less than half the trackbed remained visible as field boundaries.

Preceding station	Disused railways	Following station
Cawood; Line and station closed	NER; Cawood, Wistow and Selby Light Railway	Selby (Brayton Gates); Line and station closed
Cawood; Line and station closed	NER	Selby; Line closed, station open
