= Cawood, Wistow and Selby Light Railway =

Light railway in Yorkshire, England

Cawood, Wistow and Selby Light Railway Company
Overview
- Headquarters: Selby
- Locale: North Yorkshire, England
- Dates of operation: 1898–1900
- Predecessor: Church Fenton, Cawood and Wistow Railway (unbuilt)
- Successor: North Eastern Railway

Technical
- Track gauge: Standard
- Length: 4 miles 48 chains (7.4 km)

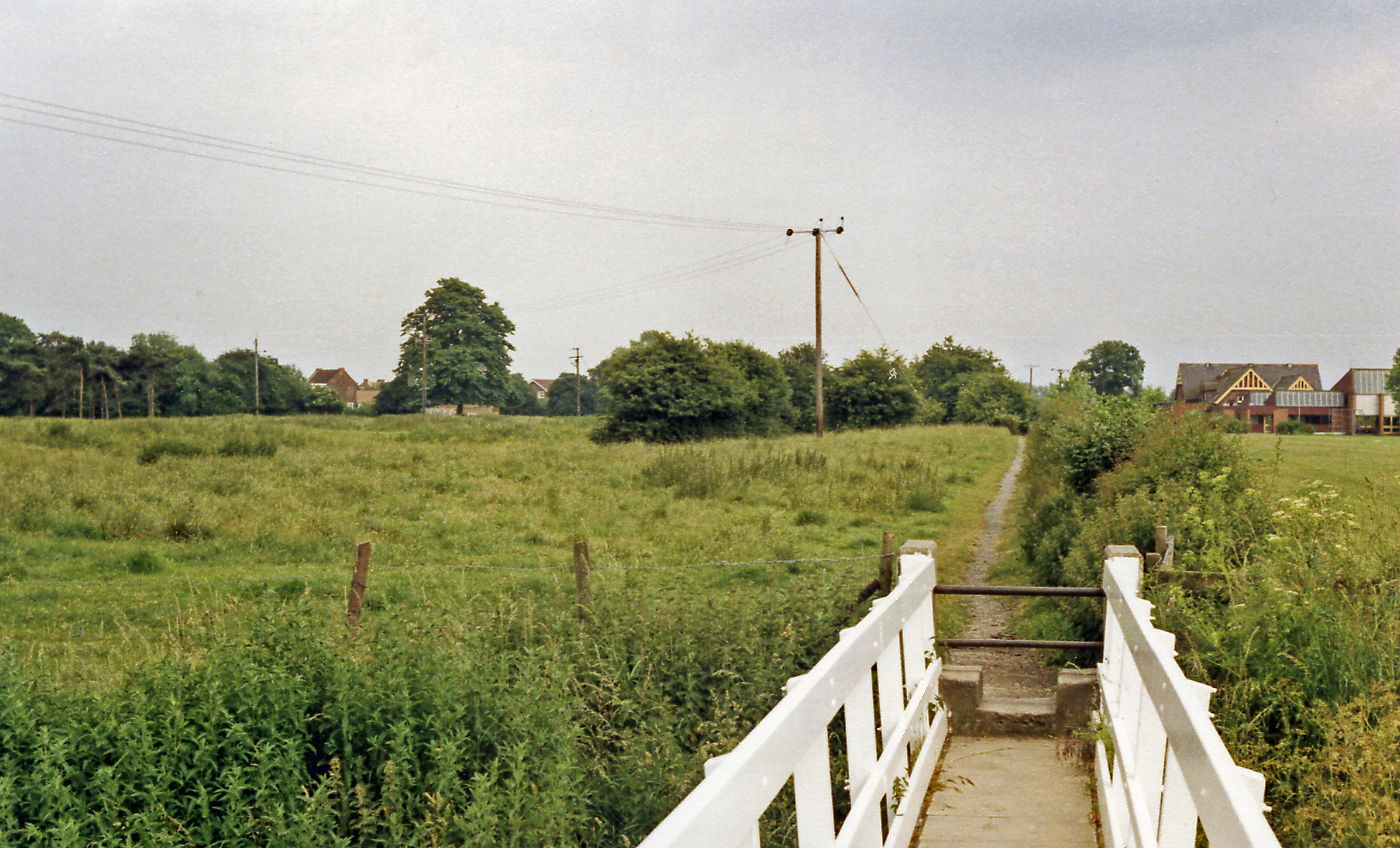
Site of Cawood station, 1988

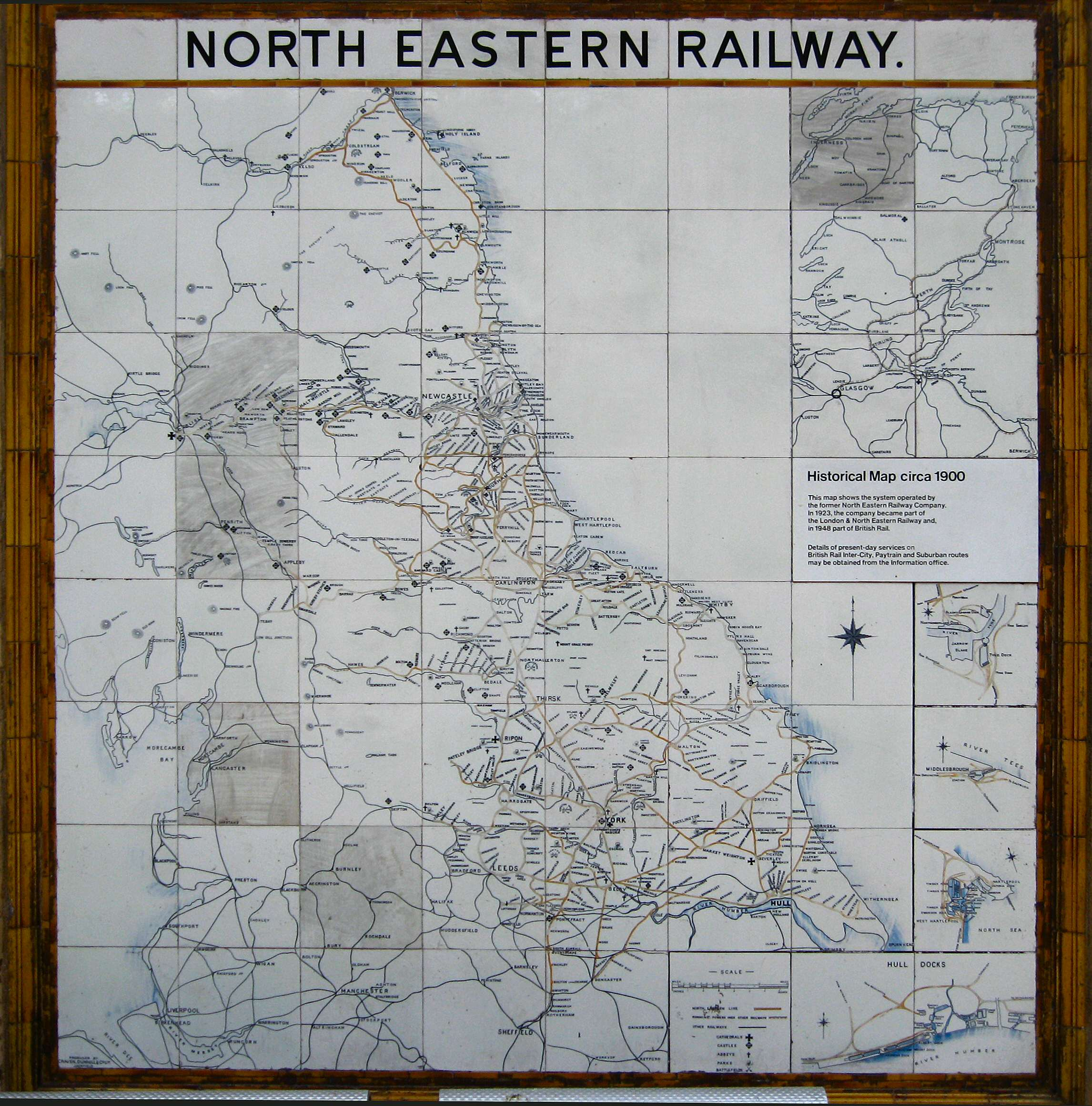
The line heading north west from Selby on the NER's tiled system map

The Cawood, Wistow and Selby Light Railway (CW&SLR) was a short light railway in a rural part of Yorkshire, England. The company was sometimes referred to as the Cawood, Wistow and Selby Railway.

== Precursor line ==
Church Fenton, Cawood, and Wistow Railway Act 1879 (Note: Section 1.)
- Act of Parliament
- Parliament of the United Kingdom
- Long title: An Act for authorising the construction of the Church Fenton, Cawood, and Wistow Railway; and for other purposes.
- Citation: 42 & 43 Vict. c. cxxviii
- Territorial extent: United Kingdom

Dates
- Royal assent: 21 July 1879
- Commencement: 21 July 1879 (Note: The Acts of Parliament (Commencement) Act 1793.)
- Repealed: 22 May 1890
Other legislation
Repealed by	Selby and Mid-Yorkshire Union Railway (Abandonment) Act 1890

Status: Repealed

Text of statute as originally enacted

Church Fenton, Cawood, and Wistow Railway Act 1882
- Act of Parliament
- Parliament of the United Kingdom
- Long title: An Act to enable the Church Fenton, Cawood, and Wistow Railway Company to construct a Railway to join the Hull, Barnsley and West Riding Junction Railway, and to extend the time for the completion of their authorised Railway; and for other purposes.
- Citation: 45 & 46 Vict. c. ccxxiii
- Territorial extent: United Kingdom

Dates
- Royal assent: 18 August 1882
- Commencement: 18 August 1882
- Repealed: 22 May 1890
Other legislation
Repealed by	Selby and Mid-Yorkshire Union Railway (Abandonment) Act 1890

Status: Repealed

Text of statute as originally enacted

Selby and Mid-Yorkshire Union Railway Act 1883
- Act of Parliament
- Parliament of the United Kingdom
- Long title: An Act to confer further powers on the Church Fenton Cawood and Wistow Railway Company; and for other purposes.
- Citation: 46 & 47 Vict. c. cxvi
- Territorial extent: United Kingdom

Dates
- Royal assent: 16 July 1883
- Commencement: 16 July 1883
- Repealed: 22 May 1890
Other legislation
Repealed by	Selby and Mid-Yorkshire Union Railway (Abandonment) Act 1890

Status: Repealed

Selby and Mid-Yorkshire Union Railway Act 1885
- Act of Parliament
- Parliament of the United Kingdom
- Long title: An Act to extend the time for the compulsory purchase of Land for, and for the completion of, the Railways authorised by the Church Fenton, Cawood and Wistow Railway Act, 1879, the Church Fenton, Cawood and Wistow Railway Act, 1882, and the Selby and Mid-Yorkshire Union Railway Act, 1883; and for other purposes.
- Citation: 48 & 49 Vict. c. cxi
- Territorial extent: United Kingdom

Dates
- Royal assent: 22 July 1885
- Commencement: 22 July 1885
- Repealed: 22 May 1890
Other legislation
Repealed by	Selby and Mid-Yorkshire Union Railway (Abandonment) Act 1890

Status: Repealed

Text of statute as originally enacted

Selby and Mid-Yorkshire Union Railway (Wistow to Drax) Abandonment Act 1889
- Act of Parliament
- Parliament of the United Kingdom
- Long title: An Act for the abandonment of the railway authorised by the Church Fenton Cawood and Wistow Railway Act 1882.
- Citation: 52 & 53 Vict. c. lxxiii
- Territorial extent: United Kingdom

Dates
- Royal assent: 9 July 1889
- Commencement: 9 July 1889
- Repealed: 31 January 2013
Other legislation
Repealed by	Statute Law (Repeals) Act 2013

Status: Repealed

Selby and Mid-Yorkshire Union Railway (Abandonment) Act 1890
- Act of Parliament
- Parliament of the United Kingdom
- Long title: An Act for the abandonment of the Railways authorised by the Church Fenton, Cawood and Wistow Railway Act, 1879, and the Selby and Mid-Yorkshire Union Railway Act, 1883.
- Citation: 53 & 54 Vict. c. xii
- Territorial extent: United Kingdom

Dates
- Royal assent: 22 May 1890
- Commencement: 22 May 1890
Other legislation
Repeals/revokes	Church Fenton, Cawood, and Wistow Railway Act 1879; Church Fenton, Cawood, and Wistow Railway Act 1882; Selby and Mid-Yorkshire Union Railway Act 1885
Repealed by	Statute Law (Repeals) Act 2013

Status: Repealed

An act of the Parliament of the United Kingdom, the Church Fenton, Cawood, and Wistow Railway Act 1879 (42 & 43 Vict. c. cxxviii) allowed the construction of the Church Fenton, Cawood and Wistow Railway from a junction at Church Fenton through Cawood to Wistow. Further acts were passed; the Church Fenton, Cawood, and Wistow Railway Act 1882 (45 & 46 Vict. c. ccxxiii) authorising a junction line to the Hull and Barnsley Railway (HBR) at Drax, and the Selby and Mid-Yorkshire Union Railway Act 1883 (46 & 47 Vict. c. cxvi) authorising an extension to Selby, and changing the name of the company to Selby and Mid-Yorkshire Union Railway. In the event, the necessary capital could not be raised, so neither of the extensions nor the original line were built, the Drax branch proposals were abandoned by the Selby and Mid-Yorkshire Union Railway (Wistow to Drax) Abandonment Act 1889 (52 & 53 Vict. c. lxxiii), and the entire remaining scheme was abandoned by the Selby and Mid-Yorkshire Union Railway (Abandonment) Act 1890 (53 & 54 Vict. c. xii).

== History ==
Cawood Wistow and Selby Light Railway Act 1896
- Act of Parliament
- Parliament of the United Kingdom
- Long title: An Act for incorporating the Cawood Wistow and Selby Light Railway Company and for other purposes.
- Citation: 59 & 60 Vict. c. xlvi
- Territorial extent: United Kingdom

Dates
- Royal assent: 2 July 1896
- Commencement: 2 July 1896

Status: Current legislation

Text of statute as originally enacted

In the 1890s the Cawood, Wistow and Selby Light Railway Company (CW&SLR) was formed at the initiative of light railway entrepreneur Sebastian Meyer, acting with a group of men of influence in the region. The North Eastern Railway (NER) gave "generous assistance", which appears to have amounted to moral support, advice and lack of opposition, but no cash. The company applied to Parliament for permission to build a light railway along similar lines to the earlier act of Parliament, but terminating to the north at Cawood. The Cawood Wistow and Selby Light Railway Act 1896 (59 & 60 Vict. c. xlvi) was passed, unopposed. Construction began on 11 July 1896, following the ceremonial cutting of the first sod at Cawood, performed by Mrs Liversidge, the chairman's wife. A rail connection near Selby was built in September of the same year to allow construction materials to be brought. The four-and-a-half-mile (7.2 km) single track line opened on 16 February 1898 with the company's sole locomotive Cawood hauling their two coaches plus five from the NER from Brayton Gates to Cawood then back to Wistow where lunch was served in the schoolroom. The NER did not allow through passenger running onto their metals, so the CW&SLR built a single platform halt next to Brayton Gates junction, about 1 mile (1.6 km) from the main Selby station. This was satisfactory for people visiting Selby town centre, but inconvenienced through travellers.

In 1899 the company's board of directors decided to pursue building an extension west from Cawood to Church Fenton. No clear junction with the railway there was specified, but the effect, deliberate or otherwise, was to unnerve the NER, who saw a potential threat should the Cawood line revive a venture along the lines of the 1879 scheme, which would allow the Hull and Barnsley Railway to penetrate the NER's fiefdoms of York and Harrogate. The NER responded by buying the Cawood company for £32,000. The sale was fully effective from 1 January 1900 and confirmed by the North Eastern Railway Act 1900 (63 & 64 Vict. c. clxii) of 30 July 1900. The NER decided not to proceed with the extension to Church Fenton. The Cawood company was formally wound up on 27 February 1900, having, unusually for such ventures, paid a dividend to shareholders throughout its short life. Thereafter the NER operated the line as a branch, as did its successors, the LNER then finally the North Eastern Region of British Railways. An early passenger benefit from the NER's takeover occurred on 1 July 1904 when Cawood branch trains were diverted to run through to the main Selby station. The Brayton Gates terminus thereby became redundant. It was closed and soon demolished.

The passenger service was withdrawn on 1 January 1930, but a goods service continued. A "Farewell" railtour ran on 22 April 1960 using two brake vans. Another party of enthusiasts was carried in the same month. The line closed on 2 May 1960. The very last train, sent out to collect a stranded van and Cawood station's office equipment, ran on 23 May 1960, hauled by a diesel shunter. As a boy, Mr John Woodall had travelled on the first train in 1898, British Railways agreed to his request to travel in the guard's van of this final trip.

== Operation ==
The line was called a "Light Railway", but it was authorised before the Light Railways Act 1896, so it received none of the benefits of that legislation. It was soundly built as a "heavy" line, but with a route availability of "two", which severely restricted the axle weight of locomotives and rolling stock which could be used. Being almost dead level and single track throughout, with a terminus at the country end, the line lent itself to one engine in steam working. The route had just one signal of its own – a fixed distant on the approach to the junction with the main line – and needed no signalboxes. Traffic passing to and from the NER was controlled by that railway using signals of their own on Cawood line territory. For this the NER used what was "Brayton Gates" signalbox, which was subsequently renamed "Wistow Junction" and in 2018 remained operational as "Selby West" signalbox. The line had seven gated level crossings and eight sets of sidings, five near level crossings, one each at Cawood and Wistow stations and exchange sidings at Brayton Gates. The loading banks next to sidings at Cawood and Wistow were long and had sections of different heights for loading and unloading different consignments. Four of the level crossings had gatekeeper's cottages with bay windows to observe the track in both directions, the two country stations' buildings were similar to each other, but differed from the NER's rural station style. By 2005 three crossing keepers' cottages survived, with the one at Broad Lane, Cawood being externally the least altered. The line had no overbridges and two underbridges, one crossed the Black Fen Drain, the other was the line's only engineering work of any note – a plate girder bridge over the Selby Dam, which, despite its name, is a small river. The line was relaid and the stations repainted in 1953, but local hopes of an upturn in fortunes came to nothing.

The line's initial passenger timetable provided five trains a day, Monday to Saturday, plying between "Selby" (i.e. Selby (Brayton Gates)) Wistow and Cawood. The journey time was 17 minutes. By July 1899 the timings had been adjusted and one train had been removed on Tuesdays to Saturdays. On Monday – Selby's Market Day – an extra train was provided out and back mid-morning and an extra from Brayton Gates at teatime, which returned empty. By 1910 the unbalanced teatime Market Train had been withdrawn and timings had been adjusted, but the pattern of four a day plus a Market Day extra remained, with the added benefit that the first train from Cawood in the morning ran through to York. The journey time remained 17 minutes despite the extra 1 mile (1.6 km) to reach Selby's main station instead of Brayton Gates.

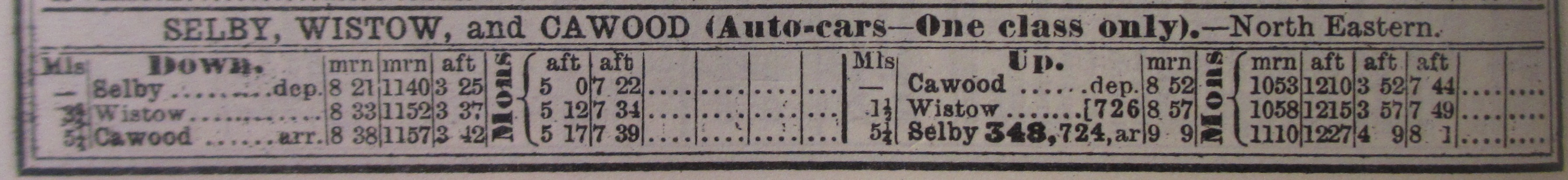
April 1910 Railway timetable

By 1914 there were two Market Day extras and four daily trains, but by 1923, whilst the Market Day extras remained, only two daily trains survived, morning and mid-evening. Passenger traffic was encouraged on occasions such as cheap tickets to visit the Wistow Show and Sports day.

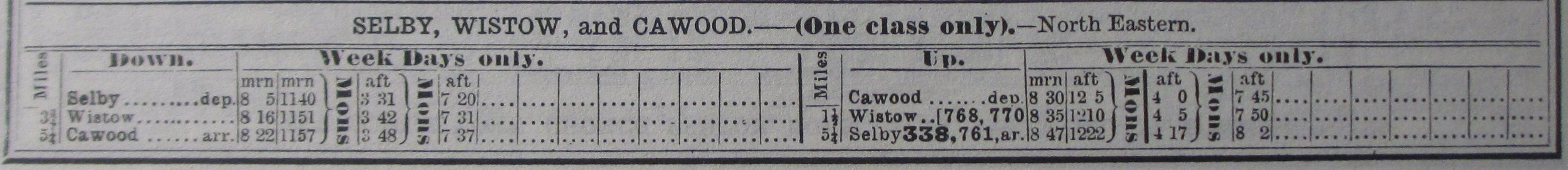
July 1923 Railway timetable

The CW&SLR had two coaches and one locomotive, an 0-6-0ST built by Manning Wardle, named Cawood. All three items were hired from the Yorkshire Railway Wagon Company (YRWC) for seven years from April 1897. The loco was housed in a single-track engine shed at Brayton Gates. Apart from being referred to as "First and Third Class composite coaches" photographs and details of the coaches have evaded historians. The company hired "wagons, sheets and ropes as may be required" from the NER.

When the NER took over they inherited the hire of Cawood and the coaches. The company arranged to return them to the YRWC in summer 1901. The coaches' fate is not known, but the loco had a varied and useful life until at least 1927. The next twenty nine years of passenger working appears quixotic, but it was ultimately dictated by the line's very low route availability, mainly caused by the Selby Dam bridge. The NER had no problem with providing very low axle-weight goods locomotives, but very light locos fitted with continuous brakes and reasonably capacious water tanks were rare. The first solution was to use NER class H2 (LNER class J79) 0-6-0T No. 407. This loco, one of a class of three, was a six-coupled development of the successful NER Class H 0-4-0T, two of which have survived into preservation. At some point No. 407 was fitted with extended tanks for use on the Cawood branch, as the line's only watering facility was a hand pump at Cawood. Three other tank engines were fitted with Westinghouse continuous brakes and moved to Selby engine shed – sister "H2" No. 1787 from 1905 to 1909 and NER Class E 0-6-0Ts Nos. 296 and 1197 from around 1908; these last are known to have worked the Market Day extra trains for several years.

In 1903 the NER introduced Petrol-electric Autocars on some lightly-used routes. After considerable development work two of them – Nos. 3170 and 3171 – moved to Selby in summer 1908 to work passenger trains on the Cawood branch, among other services. In 1909/10 four seats were taken out of both cars to enable the luggage compartments to be enlarged. The cars were driven by "Motormen" and housed from 1912 in a specially-built lean-to shed attached to the locomotive coaling stage at Selby engine shed. Remarkably, this structure survived until the shed as a whole was demolished in 1964. Use of Autocar No. 3171 appears to have faded from the early 1920s, with long periods in store. In 1923 No. 3170 was re-engined, renumbered as 3170Y and sent to work in the Harrogate area, but this lasted only for the 1923 summer season, after which there is no published evidence of it being used until it was withdrawn in 1931. Remarkably, No. 3170 was discovered in the early 21st century, having been used as a holiday home near Kirbymoorside for 70 years. It was bought in 2003 with a view to restoration and ran under its own power on the Embsay and Bolton Abbey Steam Railway in 2018.

When the autocars ceased working the line reverted to steam haulage, with trains composed of a single "Bogie Brake third" coach worked by a NER Class E 0-6-0T or, occasionally, BTP 0-4-4T No. 189.

On 9 July 1923 a quite different form of internal combustion-powered provision was deployed on some services in the form of the unique "Leyland" petrol railbus, a converted 26-seater NER road bus of conventional appearance for the period. This ran a wide-ranging diagram including the Cawood branch which came to a sudden end on 11 November 1926 when the railbus was destroyed by fire while refuelling at Selby.

The immediate hiatus was filled by a combination of BTP tank locos and a "steam autocar". Research continues as to what form this took.

On 1 May 1928 Selby received its first Sentinel steam railcars. No. 220 "Water Witch" may have been the first to work to Cawood, but it was destroyed in a collision near Doncaster on 9 June 1929. Better remembered were two similar cars, No. 225 "True Blue" and No. 273 "Trafalgar" which worked the branch until the last passenger service on Saturday 30 December 1929.

The arrival of the Sentinels followed by closure to passenger traffic reduced then removed the need for small locomotives with continuous brakes to act as backup, so they were moved away from Selby between 1929 and 1932. Occasional special passenger trains, such as excursions to pantomimes in Leeds, used the line until 1946. By 1945 declining traffic, except in the "Campaign", i.e. harvesting time for key crops of potatoes and beet, meant a handful of 0-6-0Ts were regularly in charge, notably J71s 68285 and 68286 and veteran "Ironclad" J77 68406, being replaced by a J72 towards the closure of Selby shed on 13 September 1959. From then to closure in May 1960 the line's "flyweight" trains were in the hands of Class 03 diesel shunters, particularly No. D2063. Before the Second World War trains of 40 wagons of root crops were commonplace in the Campaign, with trains of 20 wagons still to be seen in the early 1950s, but by 1955 trains ran "as required", which was rarely daily. Despite the land's rich and rising productivity the decline in traffic came about almost entirely due to road competition on price, convenience and quality. A lorry could be ordered at short notice, be loaded on the farm or even on the field then deliver immediately. By rail the produce had to be double-handled at farm then siding, incurring extra cost, time, loss and damage.

== After closure ==
The track was lifted and the Selby Dam bridge was demolished by contractors in 1961, using road vehicles. Cawood station has been demolished, Wistow station remains as a private residence. The engine shed was used by railwaymen's mutual improvement classes for many years, but was demolished in 1963. By 2010 less than half the trackbed remained visible as field boundaries.

== Bibliography ==
- Alsop, John (September 2012). "Railway Postcards of Lincolnshire, Part 2: Great Central, Minor and Joint Lines". Railway Archive. No. 36. Witney: Lightmoor Press. ISSN 1477-5336.
- Bairstow, Martin (1990). Railways in East Yorkshire. Halifax: Martin Bairstow. ISBN 978-1-871944-03-7.
- Barnett, A. L. (1992). The Light Railway King of the North. Mold: RCHS. ISBN 978-0-901461-15-5.
- Butt, R. V. J. (October 1995). The Directory of Railway Stations: details every public and private passenger station, halt, platform and stopping place, past and present (1st ed.). Sparkford: Patrick Stephens Ltd. ISBN 978-1-85260-508-7. OCLC 60251199. OL 11956311M.
- Conolly, W. Philip (1998). British railways pre-grouping atlas and gazetteer (9th impression; 5th ed.). Shepperton: Ian Allan. ISBN 978-0-7110-0320-0. OCLC 221481275.
- Chapman, Stephen (2002). Selby & Goole. Railway Memories. Todmorden: Bellcode Books. ISBN 978-1-871233-14-8. 14.
- Griffiths, Roger; Smith, Paul (2000). The Directory of British Engine Sheds and Principal Locomotive Servicing Points: 2 North Midlands, Northern England and Scotland. OPC Railprint. ISBN 978-0-86093-548-3. OCLC 59558605.
- Hartley, Kenneth E. (1973). The Cawood, Wistow and Selby Light Railway. Leeds: Turntable Enterprises. ISBN 978-0-902844-11-7.
- Hoole, Ken (1986) [1978]. The North East (A regional history of the railways of Great Britain). Vol. 4 (3 ed.). Newton Abbot: David & Charles. ISBN 978-0-7153-7746-8.
- Jowett, Alan (March 1989). Jowett's Railway Atlas of Great Britain and Ireland: From Pre-Grouping to the Present Day (1st ed.). Sparkford: Patrick Stephens Ltd. ISBN 978-1-85260-086-0. OCLC 22311137.
- Cooke, B. W. C., ed. (April 1960). "Closure of Cawood Branch". Notes and News. The Railway Magazine. Vol. 106, no. 708. London: Tothill Press Limited. ISSN 0033-8923.
- Anon (August 1900). "A Modern Mineral Railway, The East and West Yorkshire Union Railway". The Railway Magazine. London. ISSN 0033-8923.
- Scott-Morgan, John (1980). British Independent Light Railways. Newton Abbot: David and Charles. ISBN 978-0-7153-7933-2.
- Suggitt, Gordon (2005). Lost Railways of North and East Yorkshire. Newbury: Countryside Books. ISBN 978-1-85306-918-5.
- Smith, Paul; Turner, Keith (2012). Railway Atlas Then and Now. Shepperton: Ian Allan Publishing. ISBN 978-0-7110-3695-6.
