= Autocar =

Autocar may refer to:

- Autocar (magazine), a weekly British automobile magazine
- Autocar Company, an American specialist vehicle manufacturer
- Autocars Co., an Israeli car manufacturer
- Auster Autocar, a 1940s aircraft
- 1903 Petrol Electric Autocar, aa railway vehicle

== See also ==
- Automatic transmission, a multi-speed transmission used in motor vehicles
- Coach (bus), a passenger-carrying vehicle
- Electric vehicle, that uses one or more electric motors for propulsion
- Otokar, a Turkish manufacturer of buses and military vehicles
- Self-driving car, a car that is capable of traveling without human input
- Steam car, propelled by a steam engine
