= NER 66 Aerolite =

Preserved British steam locomotive

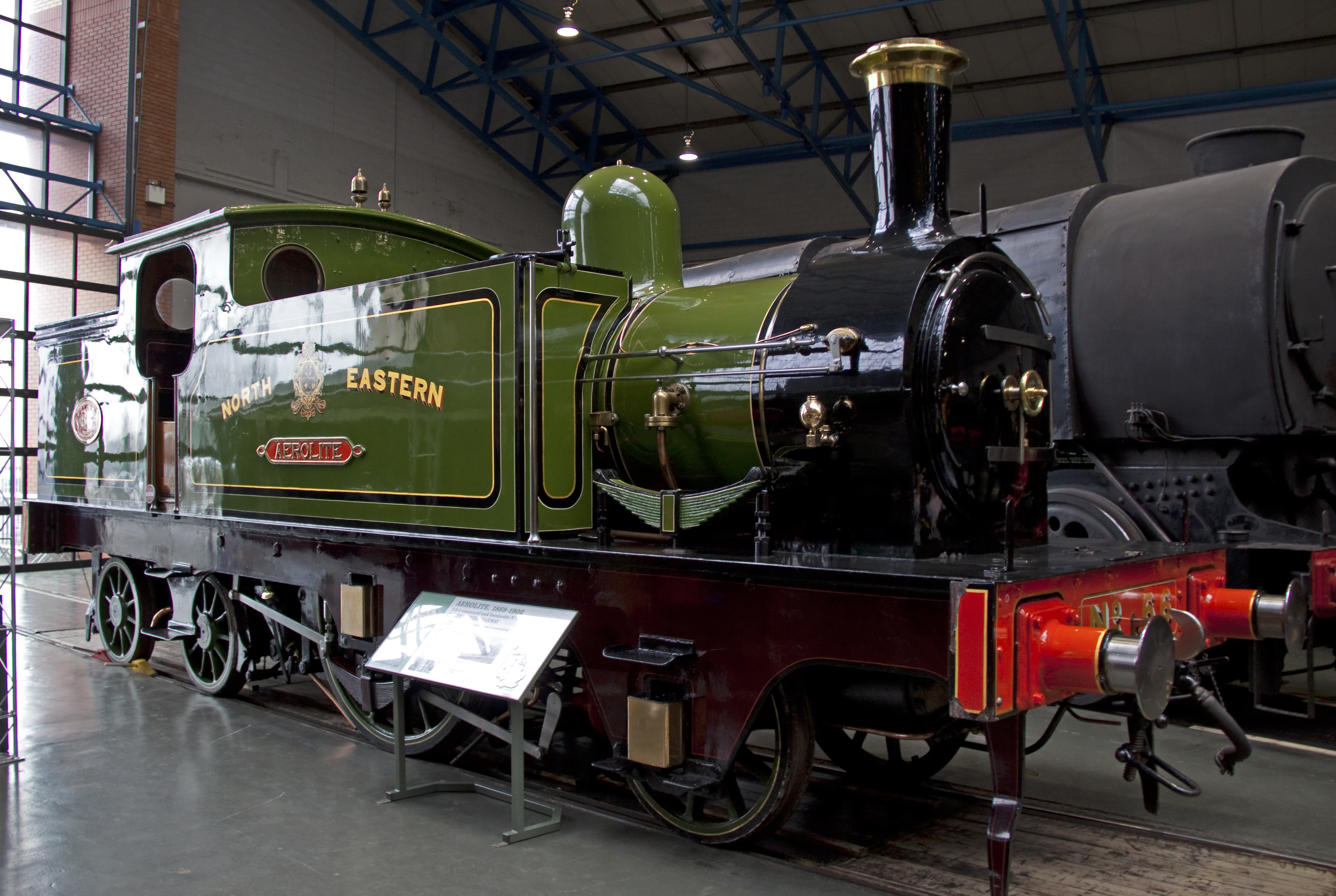
- 66 Aerolite preserved at National Railway Museum
Type and origin
- Power type: Steam
- Builder: Gateshead works
- Build date: 1869
- Total produced: 1
- Rebuild date: 1892, 1902
Specifications
- Configuration
  - Whyte: 2-2-2WT, rebuilt as 4-2-2T, rebuilt again as 2-2-4T
- Gauge: 4 ft 8 1/2 in (1,435 mm) standard gauge
- Leading dia.: 3 ft 7 in (1.092 m)
- Driver dia.: 5 ft 7 3/4 in (1.721 m)
- Trailing dia.: 3 ft 1 1/4 in (0.946 m)
- Wheelbase: 20 ft 7 in (6.27 m)
- Length: 32 ft 8 1/2 in (9.970 m)
- Axle load: 19.5 long tons (19.8 t; 21.8 short tons)
- Loco weight: 2-2-2T: 37.0 long tons (37.6 t; 41.4 short tons); 4-2-2T: 38.15 long tons (38.76 t; 42.73 short tons); 2-2-4T: 44.10 long tons (44.81 t; 49.39 short tons)
- Fuel capacity: 2.5 long tons (2.5 t; 2.8 short tons)
- Water cap.: 1,620 imp gal (7,400 L; 1,950 US gal)
- Firebox
  - Grate area: 11 sq ft (1.0 m^{2})
- Boiler: 3 ft 9 3/4 in (1.162 m) diameter
- Boiler pressure: 175 psi (1.21 MPa)
- Heating surface
  - Firebox: 65 sq ft (6.0 m^{2})
  - Tubes: 701 sq ft (65.1 m^{2})
  - Total surface: 766 sq ft (71.2 m^{2})
- Cylinders: 2 inside (1 HP 1 LP)
- High-pressure cylinder: 13 in × 20 in (330 mm × 508 mm)
- Low-pressure cylinder: 18.5 in × 20 in (470 mm × 510 mm)
- Valve gear: Stephenson
Performance figures
- Tractive effort: 6,390 lbf (28.4 kN)
Career
- Operators: NER, LNER
- Class: LNER: X1
- Numbers: 66
- Official name: Aerolite
- Retired: 1933
- Disposition: Static display

North Eastern Railway (NER) No. 66 Aerolite is a one-off preserved British steam locomotive. It was classified X1 by the LNER. It was capable of reaching 55 mph (89 km/h).

== History ==
Aerolite was built in 1869 as a replacement for an engine of the same name built by Kitson's for the Great Exhibition in 1851 and which was destroyed in a collision in 1868. The engine, like its predecessor, was used to haul the Mechanical Engineer's saloon. Originally a 2-2-2WT, side tanks were added 1886, and around this time it received the number 66.

In 1892 Aerolite was rebuilt into a 4-2-2T, destroying much of the original engine. The well tank was removed, the side tanks expanded, and the two-cylinder Worsdell-von Borries compounding system applied. In 1902 it was again rebuilt into a 2-2-4T.

Aerolite was withdrawn in 1933 and preserved in 1934 at the LNER's York museum. It was moved to Shildon Locomotion Museum from National Railway Museum in 2023 due to renovations at an engine shed. It is a static exhibit at Shildon Locomotion Museum in Shildon, County Durham as of 2024.

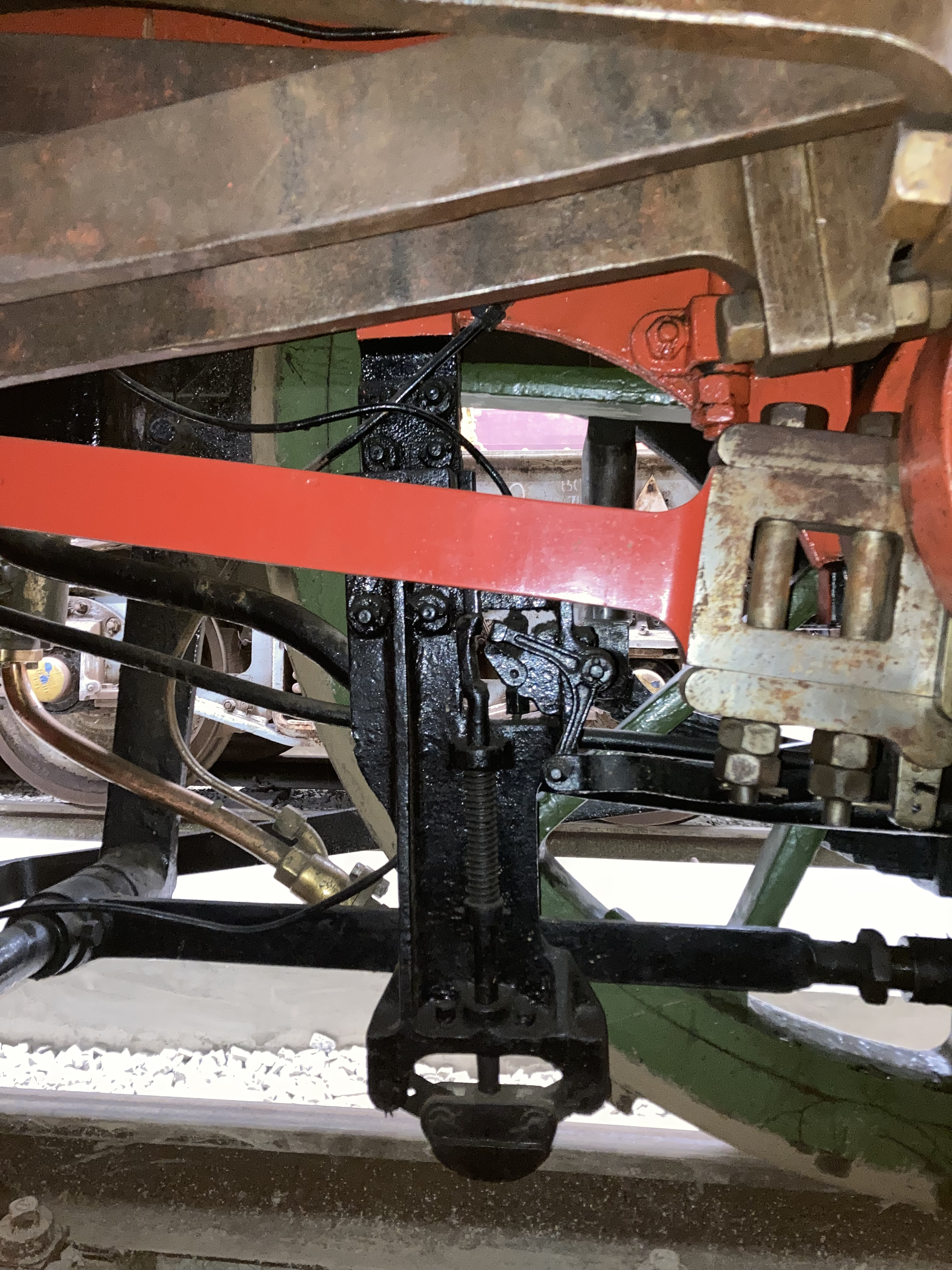
Fog signalling striker attached to the frames of Aerolite

As the locomotive was withdrawn just before Raven's Fog Signalling System was replaced, it is the only surviving locomotive retaining its fog signalling striker, which may be seen attached to the inside of the frames on the right hand side of the locomotive, just in front of the driving wheel. When a distant signal was at "caution" or a home signal was at "danger", stops between the rails were raised and when coming into contact with the locomotive striker, activated a whistle in the cab and made a partial brake application.

== In popular culture ==
Aerolite is the basis for the Thomas & Friends character named Whiff, an industrial rubbish engine whose job is to shunt rubbish to the Sodor rubbish dump, which was renamed to the Sodor Recycling Plant.
