= 2-2-4T =

Tank locomotive wheel arrangement

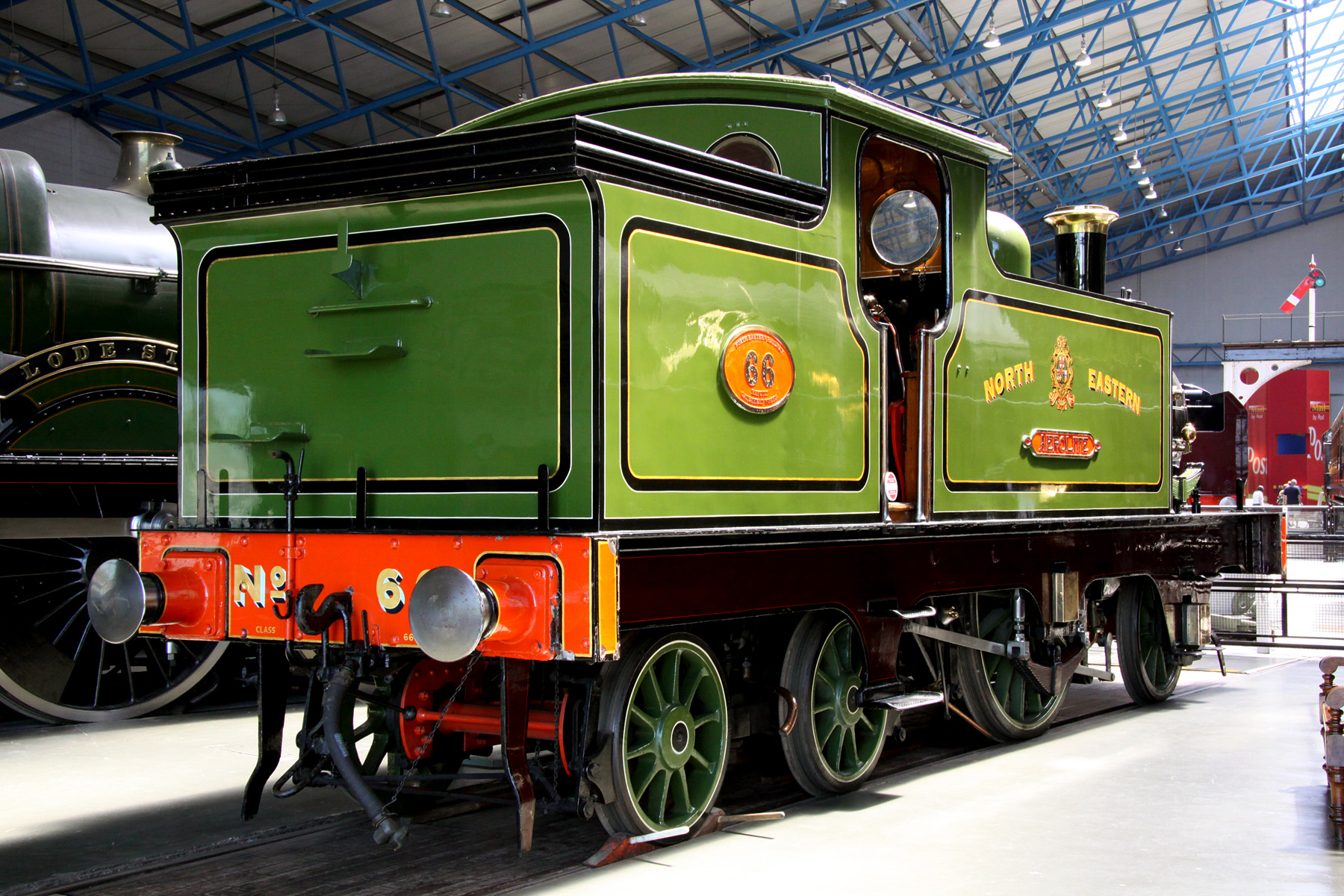
NER 66 Aerolite is an example of a 2-2-4 locomotive

In Whyte notation, a 2-2-4T is a steam locomotive that has two leading wheels followed by two coupled driving wheels and four trailing wheels. This was an unusual wheel arrangement, only used on a few specialised locomotives. This wheel arrangement is only used for tank locomotives.

== Equivalent classifications ==
Other equivalent classifications are:

- UIC classification: 1A2 (also known as German classification and Italian classification)
- French classification: 112
- Turkish classification: 14
- Swiss classification: 1/4

== UK examples ==
In the United Kingdom, the North Eastern Railway, had four tank locomotives of this wheel arrangement, all of which had previously been rebuilt from other types. They were: No. 66 Aerolite rebuilt as a 2-2-4T in 1902 and later known as in LNER class X1; No. 957, which had been rebuilt from a BTP class 0-4-4T in 1903 and later classified as X2 class. NER 190 Class, later class X3 had two members, Nos. 190 and 1679, both rebuilt from 2-2-2 tender locomotives. All four were inherited by the London and North Eastern Railway (LNER) at the time of its formation on 1 January 1923, and withdrawn from service between 1931 and 1937. No. 66 Aerolite has been preserved at the National Railway Museum in York.
