= NER Bogie Tank Passenger =

Class of British steam locomotives

NER Bogie Tank Passenger LNER Class G6
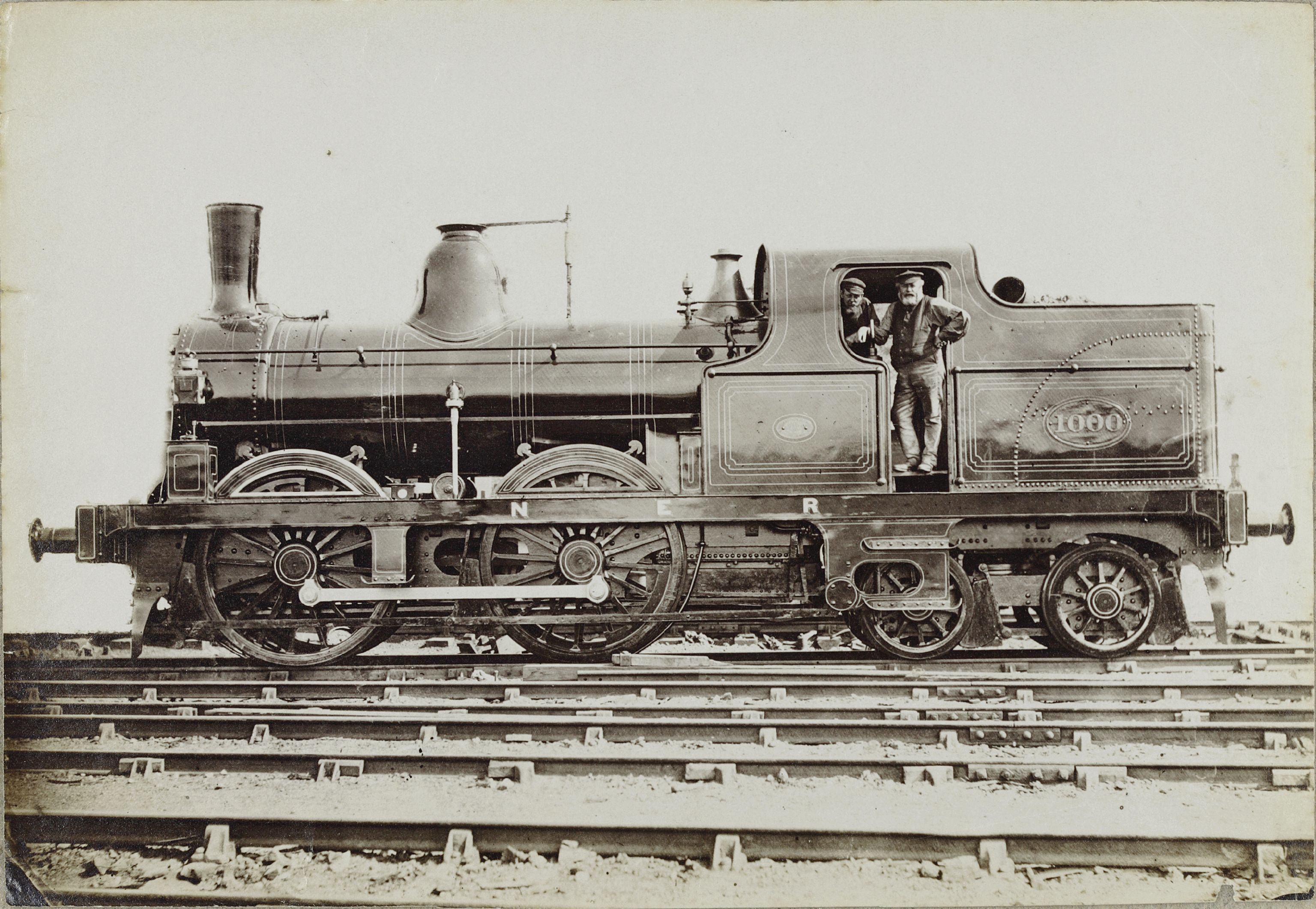
Type and origin
- Power type: Steam
- Designer: Edward Fletcher
- Builder: Neilson & Co.; Hawthorn & Co.; NER, Gateshead; NER, Darlington; NER, York
- Build date: 1874–84
- Total produced: 124
Specifications
- Configuration
  - Whyte: 0-4-4T
- Driver dia.: 5 ft 6 in (1.68 m)
- Trailing dia.: 3 ft 4 in (1.02 m)
- Wheelbase: 21 ft 8 in (6.60 m)
- Length: 33 ft 8 in (10.26 m)
- Fuel capacity: 2 long tons (2.0 t)
- Water cap.: 1,000 imp gal (4,500 L; 1,200 US gal)
- Firebox
  - Grate area: 12.8 sq ft (1.19 m^{2})
- Boiler: 10 ft 7 in (3.23 m) length 4 ft 3 in (1.30 m) diameter
- Boiler pressure: 160 psi (1.1 MPa)
- Heating surface
  - Firebox: 84 sq ft (7.8 m^{2})
  - Tubes: 1,025 sq ft (95.2 m^{2}) (205 x 1.75")
  - Total surface: 1,109 sq ft (103.0 m^{2})
- Cylinders: 2
- Cylinder size: 17 in × 24 in (430 mm × 610 mm)
Performance figures
- Tractive effort: 13,101 lbf (58.28 kN)
Career
- Operators: North Eastern Railway; London and North Eastern Railway
- Class: LNER: G6
- Withdrawn: 1920-1929
- Disposition: 60 rebuilt 1899–1921 to NER Class 290; 1 rebuilt 1903 to LNER Class X2; 63 scrapped

The North Eastern Railway (NER) Bogie Tank Passenger (BTP) locomotives were designed by Edward Fletcher in 1873. The locomotives were for hauling passenger services on branch lines. They had an 0-4-4 wheel layout and a total of 124 locomotives were built. They were designated G6 by the London and North Eastern Railway (LNER).

== Rebuilds ==
With the introduction of the NER Class O (LNER G5), BTP locomotives started to become redundant. Fifty of the redundant BTPs were rebuilt between 1899 and 1908 as NER Class 290 (later LNER Class J77) 0-6-0T locomotives. In 1903, locomotive No. 957 was rebuilt as a 2-2-4T (later designated LNER Class X2) specifically for hauling an officer's saloon. With the reduction in passenger services towards the end of World War I, many of the BTPs became redundant. In 1921, ten BTPs were rebuilt to create further Class 290 locomotives.

== Steam autocars ==
Many class BTPs gained a further lease of life in the early 1900s by being converted to work the Steam Autocars (push–pull trains) then being introduced. A Steam Autocar consisted of a BTP with one or two coaches (in which case the engine was in the middle), the train was driven from a driving compartment in the leading coach, leaving the fireman on the footplate. The driver had control of the regulator and reverser by means of a mechanical connection running under the coach and connecting to the engine using a form of universal joints. The driver also had full (Westinghouse) brake control via a second air pipe connection to the engine. This high pressure air supply also worked a whistle mounted above the driving compartment. Finally there was speaking tube communication between the driver and fireman - although there is evidence that this was little used.

Steam autocars were gradually withdrawn as the LNER introduced Sentinel steam railcars. The coaches were converted back to normal coaches but the BTPs were withdrawn.

== Withdrawal ==
Withdrawals of the G6 took place between 1920 and 1929, and none were preserved.
