= NER Class 290 =

Class of British steam locomotives

NER Class 290 LNER Class J77
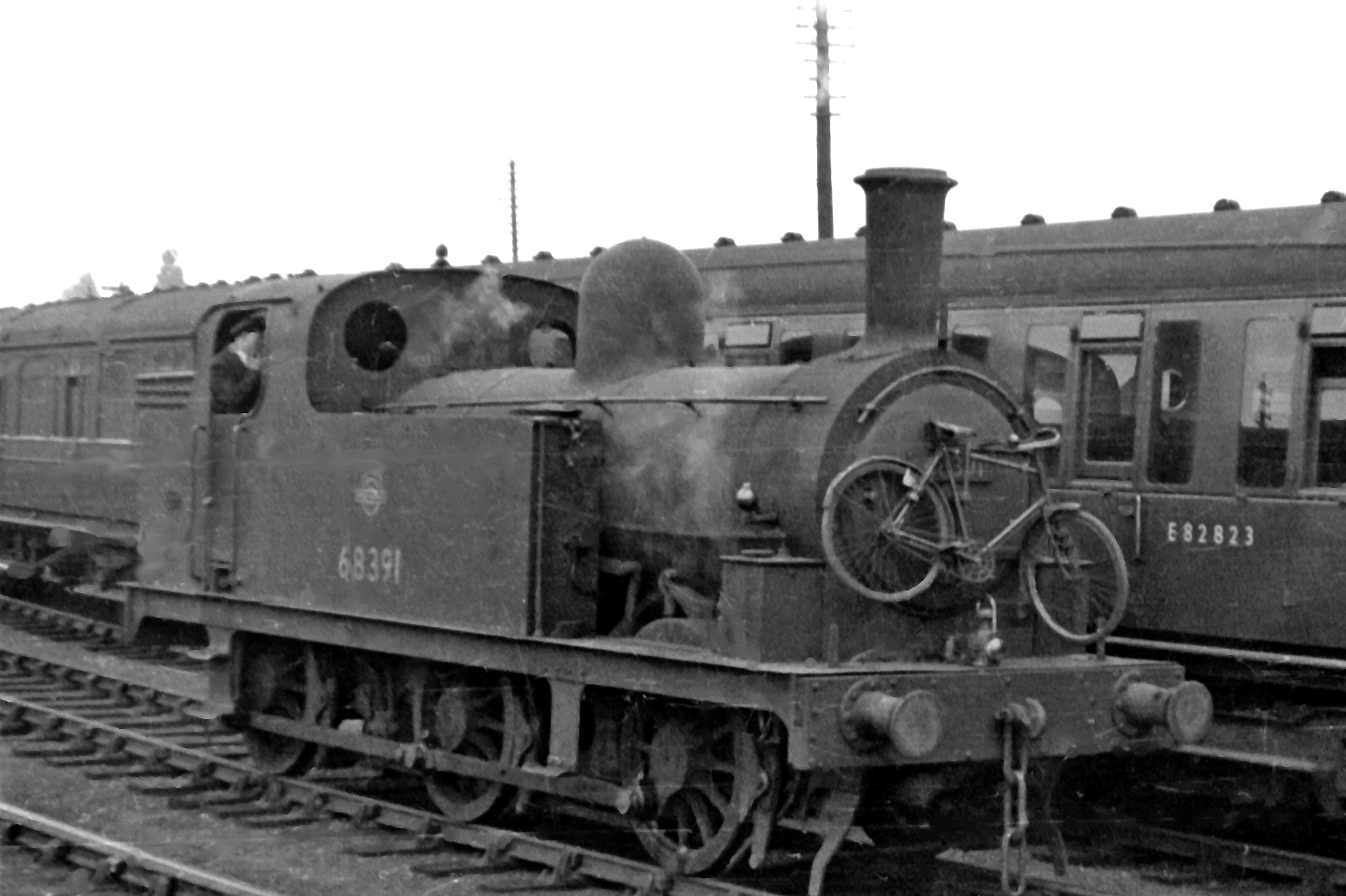
- No. 68391 (ex. 953) was built in 1874 and rebuilt in 1904 - it survived until 1957. Middlesbrough Locomotive Depot 1953
Type and origin
- Power type: Steam
- Designer: Edward Fletcher reb.Wilson Worsdell
- Rebuilder: NER, York; NER, Darlington
- Rebuild date: 1899–1921
- Number rebuilt: 60
Specifications
- Configuration
  - Whyte: 0-6-0T
- Gauge: 4 ft 8 1/2 in (1,435 mm)
- Driver dia.: 4 ft 1.25 in (1.251 m)
- Length: 29 ft 9.25 in (9.0742 m)
- Loco weight: 43 long tons (44 t)
- Fuel type: coal
- Fuel capacity: 2.25 long tons (2.29 t)
- Water cap.: 700 imp gal (3,200 L; 840 US gal)
- Firebox
  - Grate area: 12.8 sq ft (1.19 m^{2})
- Boiler pressure: 160 psi (1,100 kPa)
- Cylinders: two inside
- Cylinder size: 17 in × 27 in (430 mm × 690 mm)
Performance figures
- Tractive effort: 17,560 lbf (78,100 N)

The NER Class 290 (LNER Class J77) was a class of 0-6-0T steam locomotives of the North Eastern Railway (NER), rebuilt from an earlier class of 0-4-4T, the NER Bogie Tank Passenger (BTP, later LNER Class G6).

== History ==
Large numbers of the NER G6 0-4-4WT class were made redundant during the 1890s. Forty of these were rebuilt as 0-6-0T shunting locomotives at York Works between 1899 and 1904. Ten further were rebuilt at Darlington, in 1907-8 and a further ten in 1921.

== Equipment ==
The G6 BTP were built with Westinghouse brakes. These were replaced with steam brakes on all but two of the J77s (Nos. 37 and 1437). These were removed in the late 1930s. Twelve of the J77s received vacuum brakes after 1945. This fitting was usually accompanied by the addition of carriage heating equipment.

== Use ==
They were used for general shunting and marshalling coal trains. Withdrawals started in 1933 but 45 survived into British Railways ownership in 1948. Their BR numbers were 68390-68440 (with gaps).

== Withdrawal ==
Most were withdrawn during the 1950s and replaced by diesel shunters. The last J77 to be withdrawn was No. 68408 of South Blyth in February 1961. None were preserved.
