= NER Class E1 =

Class of 0-6-0T locomotives designed by Wilson Worsdell

NER Class E1 LNER Class J72
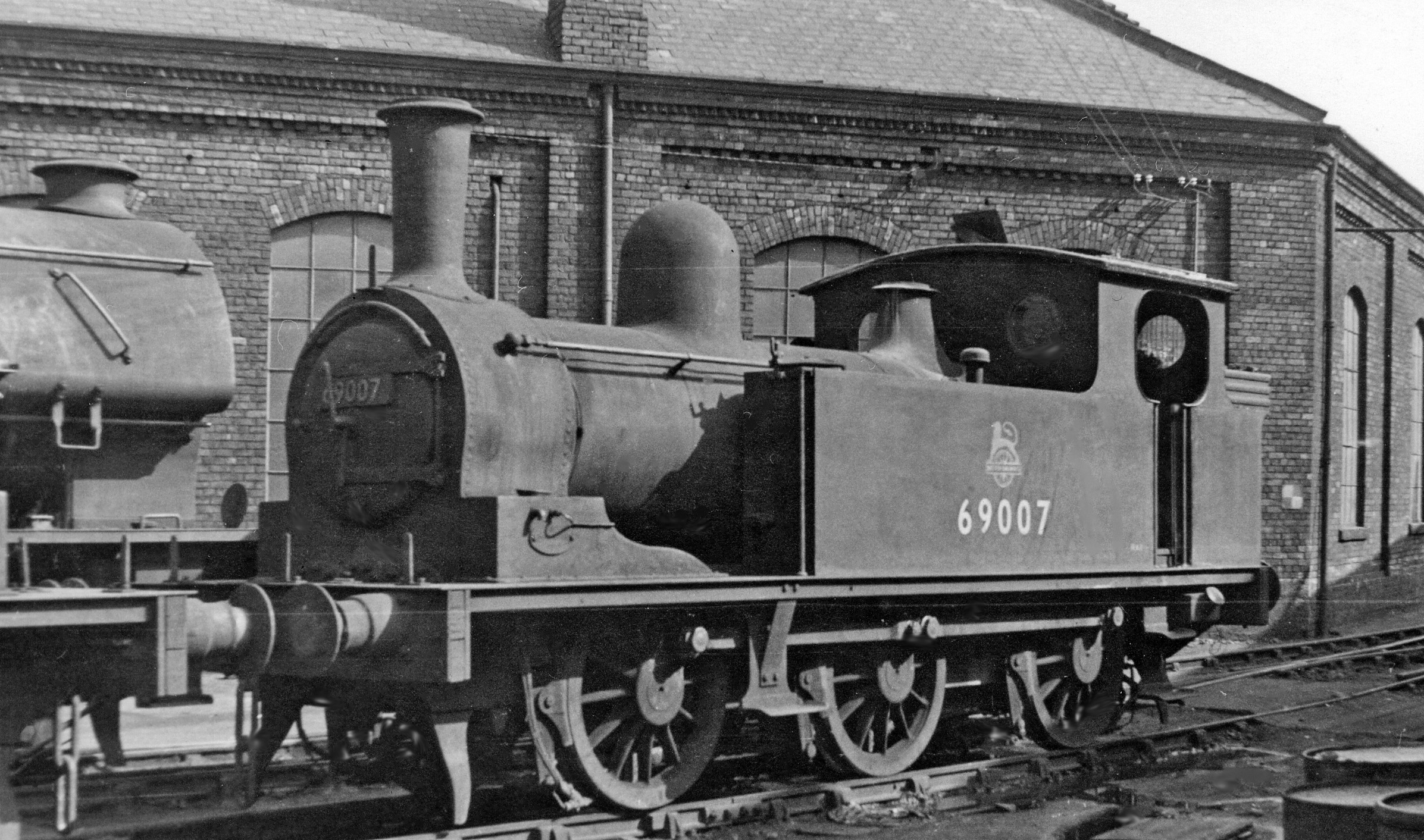
- 69007 at Sunderland South Dock depot
Type and origin
- Power type: Steam
- Designer: Wilson Worsdell
- Builder: Darlington Works (78); Armstrong Whitworth (25); Doncaster Works (10)
- Build date: 1898–1951
- Total produced: 113
Specifications
- Configuration
  - Whyte: 0-6-0T
- Gauge: 4 ft 8 1/2 in (1,435 mm)
- Driver dia.: 4 ft 1 1/4 in (1.251 m)
- Wheelbase: 13 ft 8 in (4.166 m)
- Loco weight: 38.6 long tons (39.2 t)
- Fuel type: Coal
- Fuel capacity: 1.25 long tons (1.27 t)
- Boiler pressure: 140 lbf/in^{2} (0.97 MPa)
- Cylinders: Two, inside
- Cylinder size: 17 in × 24 in (432 mm × 610 mm)
- Valve gear: Stephenson
Performance figures
- Tractive effort: 16,760 lbf (74.55 kN)
Career
- Operators: North Eastern Railway; London and North Eastern Railway; British Railways
- Power class: 2F
- Axle load class: LNER/BR: Route availability 2
- Withdrawn: 1958–1964
- Disposition: One preserved, remainder scrapped

The North Eastern Railway Class E1, classified as Class J72 by the London and North Eastern Railway (LNER), is a class of small 0-6-0T steam locomotives designed by Wilson Worsdell for shunting. They had inside cylinders and Stephenson valve gear.

They were a development of the earlier NER Class E (LNER Class J71) 0-6-0T designed by T.W. Worsdell, who was Wilson Worsdell's brother. The main changes to the design were smaller diameter wheels and larger cylinders.

== History ==
=== Build dates ===
A total of 113 locomotives were built:

- 1898–1899, 20 locos built by NER at Darlington Works
- 1914, 20 locos built by NER at Darlington Works
- 1920, 10 locos built by NER at Darlington Works
- 1922, 25 locos built for NER by Armstrong Whitworth & Co
- 1925, 10 locos built by LNER at Doncaster Works
- 1949–1951, 28 locos built by British Railways at Darlington Works

The LNER planned to build more locomotives in 1930 and 1931 but the orders were cancelled.

This is the only example of a locomotive class which was built, completely unchanged, under pre-grouping, post-grouping and British Railways administration.

=== Numbering ===
LNER numbers for the locomotives were scattered between 462 and 1770, then in blocks 2173-2192 and 2303-2337. From 1946 the LNER renumbered the locomotives 8670-8754. British Railways numbers were 68670-68754 for the pre-nationalisation locos and 69001-69028 for the new-build locos.

=== Operation ===
Under LNER ownership the J72 locomotives were also used outside the former NER's area. Examples were allocated to sheds from all seven of the LNER's major constituents, at locations including Edinburgh, Wrexham, Ipswich and Neasden.

Vacuum brakes were fitted to 49 of the locomotives and some of the class were equipped for steam heating of carriages.

=== Liveries ===
The standard livery for the locomotives was unlined black with the numbers on the side tanks. Exceptions to this were the locomotives built at Doncaster, which were originally given red lining, and locomotives allocated to Scottish sheds which had numbers on the bunker sides.

For use as a station pilot at Newcastle Central 8680 was given LNER lined green livery in 1947. After nationalisation it received a BR emblem and was later painted BR lined black. In 1960 two locomotives, 68736 and 68723, were painted in NER green with both NER and BR emblems for use as station pilots at York and Newcastle. After a few months 68736 was moved to join 68723 at Newcastle until both locomotives were withdrawn in 1963.

=== Withdrawal ===
The first locomotives were withdrawn in 1958 and the last in 1964. Two locomotives were transferred to departmental stock and renumbered as 58 and 59. One of these, 69005, was scrapped in 1967 and the other, 69023, is now preserved.

== Preservation ==
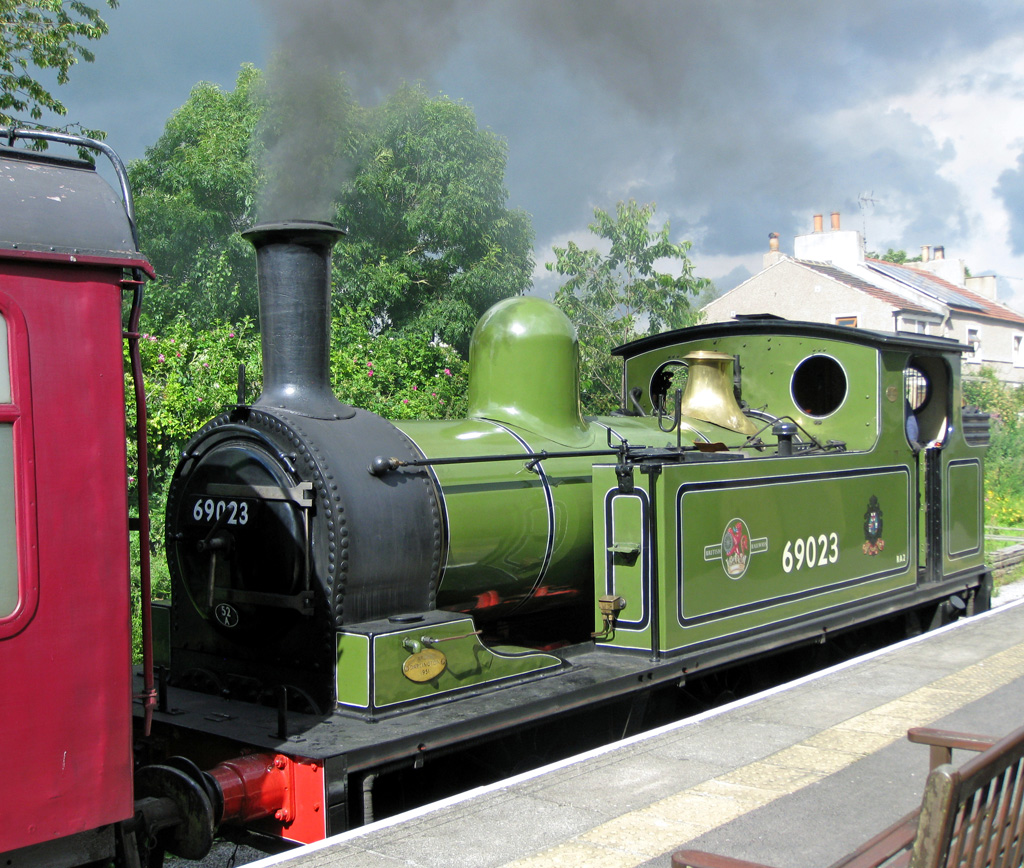
69023 in a hybrid apple green scheme in 2014 when running on the Wensleydale Railway

No. 69023 (Departmental No. 59) was purchased in 1966 by Ronald Ainsworth, who named it Joem after his parents. It initially operated on the Keighley & Worth Valley Railway. Since 1982 the locomotive has been owned by the North Eastern Locomotive Preservation Group and has worked on several preserved railways. In contrast to the normal black paint finish, this loco operates in a hybrid NER/LNER/BR apple green paint scheme. It re-entered service in 2010 after an overhaul and was based on the Wensleydale Railway, but as of 2022 was out of service and had returned to the NELPG's base in Darlington for boiler repairs.
