= NER Class E =

Class of 0-6-0T locomotives designed by Thomas Worsdell

NER Class E LNER Class J71
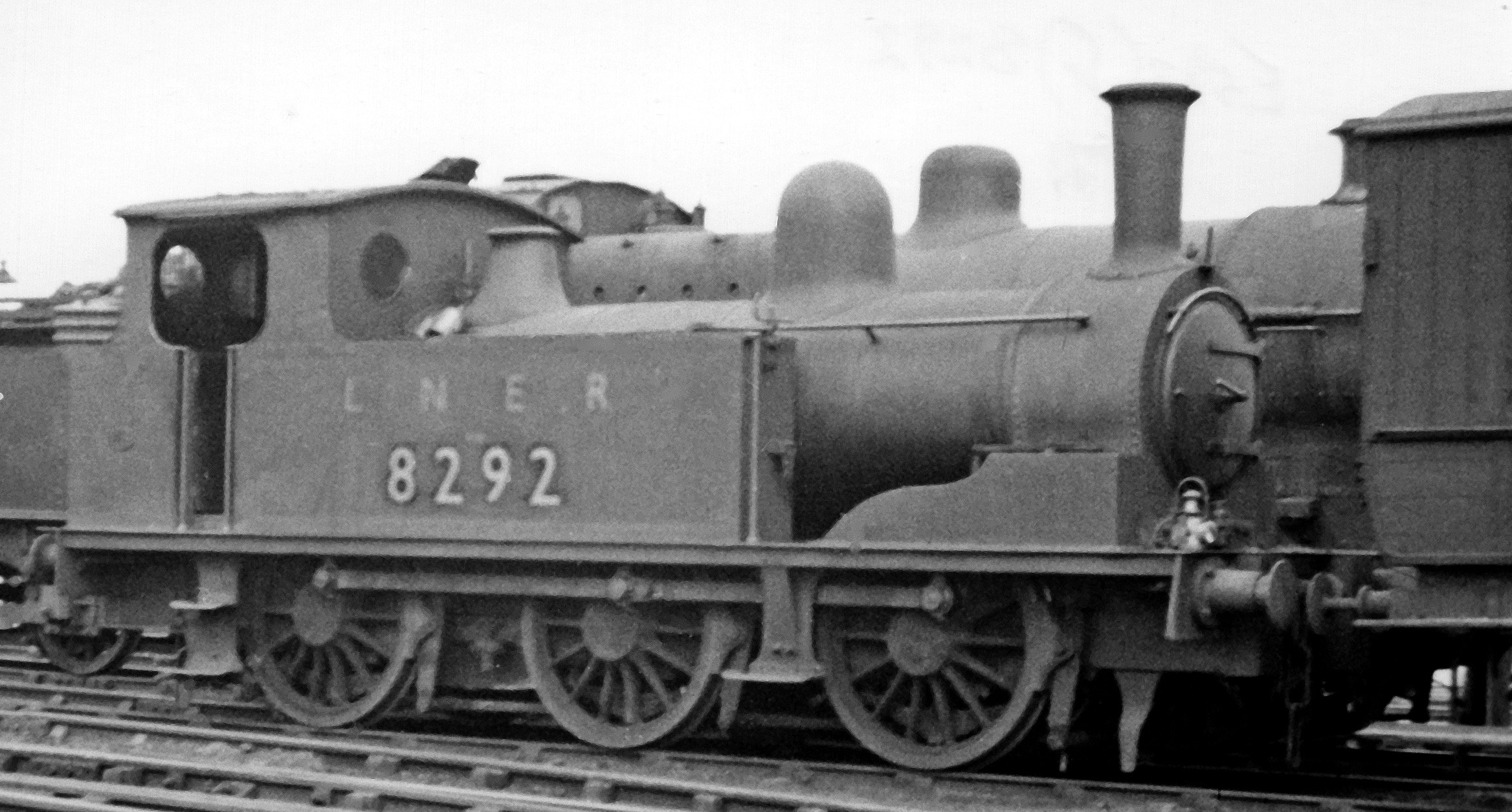
- No. 8292 at Normanton Locomotive Depot 1947
Type and origin
- Power type: Steam
- Designer: T.W. Worsdell
- Builder: NER Darlington Works
- Build date: 1886-1895
- Total produced: 120
Specifications
- Configuration
  - Whyte: 0-6-0T
- Gauge: 4 ft 8 1/2 in (1,435 mm)
- Driver dia.: 4 ft 6 in (1.37 m)
- Wheelbase: 13 ft 8 in (4.17 m)
- Length: 28 ft 8 3/4 in (8.757 m)
- Axle load: 13.2 long tons (13.4 t)
- Loco weight: 37.6 long tons (38.2 t)
- Fuel type: coal
- Fuel capacity: 1.25 long tons (1.27 t)
- Water cap.: 690 imp gal (3,100 L; 830 US gal)
- Firebox
  - Grate area: 11.3 sq ft (1.05 m^{2})
- Boiler pressure: 140 psi (0.97 MPa)
- Cylinders: Two, inside
- Cylinder size: 16 in × 22 in (410 mm × 560 mm); last 20 built with 16 3/4 in × 22 in (430 mm × 560 mm)
- Valve gear: Stephenson valve gear
- Loco brake: Steam
- Train brakes: Some fitted with vacuum for passenger use
Performance figures
- Tractive effort: 12,130 lbf (54.0 kN)
Career
- Operators: North Eastern Railway; London & North Eastern Railway; British Railways
- Number in class: 81 (BR)
- Withdrawn: 1933–1961
- Disposition: All scrapped

The North Eastern Railway (NER) Class E, classified as Class J71 by the London and North Eastern Railway (LNER), was a class of small 0-6-0T steam locomotives designed by T.W. Worsdell. They had inside cylinders and Stephenson valve gear and were the basis for the later NER Class E1 (LNER Class J72).

== Numbering ==
LNER numbers for the locomotives were scattered between 27 and 1864.

Eighty-one of them passed into British Railways ownership in 1948 and they were numbered 68230-68316 in the range, with gaps.

== Liveries ==
In 1947 8266 received LNER lined green livery for use as a station pilot at York.

== Accidents and incidents ==
- In 1890, locomotive No. 811 was hauling a freight train when it was derailed on the Redheugh Incline, Gateshead, County Durham.
