= 1903 Petrol Electric Autocar =

1903 experimental petrol-electric railcar in the United Kingdom

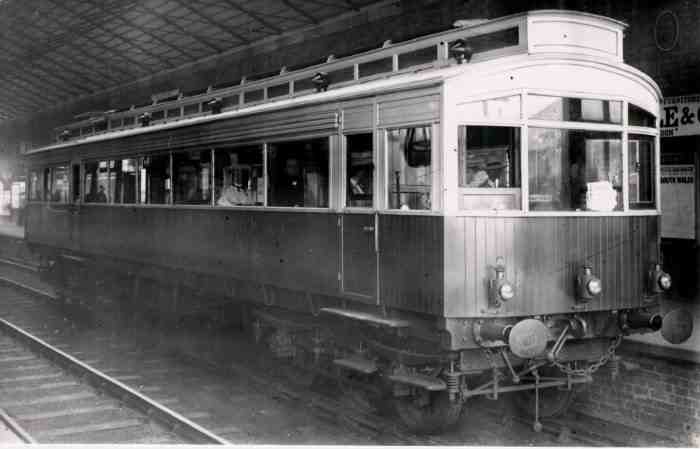
- Autocar at Filey Station
- Manufacturer: North Eastern Railway
- Constructed: 1903
- Number built: 2
- Number preserved: 1
- Fleet numbers: 3170 and 3171
- Capacity: 52 seats

Specifications
- Train length: 53.5 ft (16.3 m)
- Weight: 35 long tons (36 t)
- Prime mover: 85 hp Napier engine

The 1903 Petrol Electric Autocars were built by the North Eastern Railway in 1903 at their carriage works in York, England. These were powered by petrol engines which generated electricity for two traction motors which were mounted on the bogie underneath. This pioneering means of powering a railway vehicle eventually developed into the diesel-electric technology used on most diesel locomotives worldwide. The railcars were numbered 3170 and 3171 and were 53.5 feet (16.3 m) long and weighed around 35 long tons (36 t). The engine was mounted in an engine compartment 13.25 feet (4.04 m) long. The rest of the vehicles' length was taken up by a vestibule, driving compartment and a 52-seat passenger compartment. Two were built and ran until 1930; one has been restored and preserved in working order.

== Powertrain ==
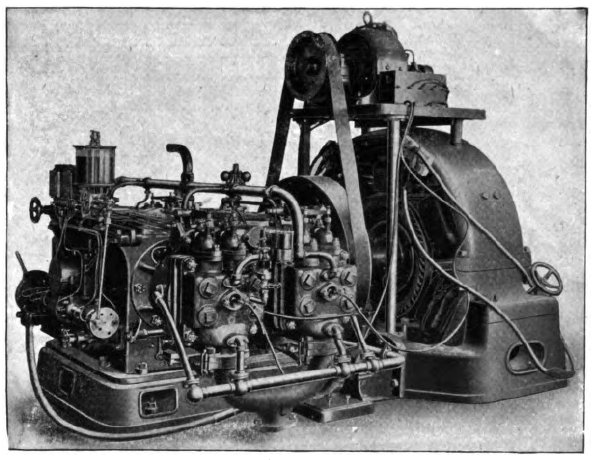
The Wolseley engine and dynamo

The concept of using electric propulsion was pioneered by Vincent Raven, the assistant chief mechanical engineer for the North Eastern Railway. When first built, each of the two autocars was fitted with a 85 hp (63 kW) Napier petrol engine, which were connected to a 550-volt dynamo. This provided power to two 55 hp (41 kW) motors, connected to the axles of the power bogie by gears. During trials, the engines were found to be problematic, and were replaced in 1904 prior to them entering public service by Wolseley horizontally opposed petrol engines. These flat-four engines produced 92 bhp (69 kW) at their normal rated speed of 400 rpm, and well over 100 bhp (75 kW) when run at 480 rpm. The cylinders were 8.5 in (220 mm) diameter with a 10 in (250 mm) stroke.

The engine had a 3 ft (91 cm) diameter flywheel, and was coupled directly to a Westinghouse multi-polar dynamo. The dynamo driven by a belt from the flywheel provided charge for the accumulators which enabled electric starting of the engine, lighting for the carriage, and the 'exciting current' for the field coils in the main dynamo, controlled by rheostats at either end of the railcar. The engine speed could likewise be controlled via a throttle from either end of the railcar. The output from the main dynamo was sent to two electric motors, both mounted on the bogie underneath the engine room.

In 1923, No. 3170 was re-engined with a more powerful 6-cylinder 225 hp engine, allowing it to haul an unpowered coach, an early version of the multiple units used today. The maximum speed was only 36 mph (58 km/h) but acceleration and braking to and from this was reported to be brisk, taking around 30 seconds. In 1908, a pair of seats were removed to enlarge the vestibules, reducing the seating accommodation to 48. The railcars were similar in appearance to single-deck trams. The NER called them autocars, as they could be driven from either end, as with modern passenger trains.

In the late 1920s, the LNER considered replacing the petrol engine in one of the autocars with a diesel engine, but they were withdrawn before this was implemented.

== Service ==
The railcars worked briefly on Teesside, then in Yorkshire for the rest of their working lives, on lines round Scarborough, Harrogate and Selby. They were used very little during the 1920s. No. 3171 was withdrawn on 31 May 1930 and scrapped, while No. 3170 was withdrawn on 4 April 1931, but the body was sold to be used as a holiday home in North Yorkshire.

== Preservation ==
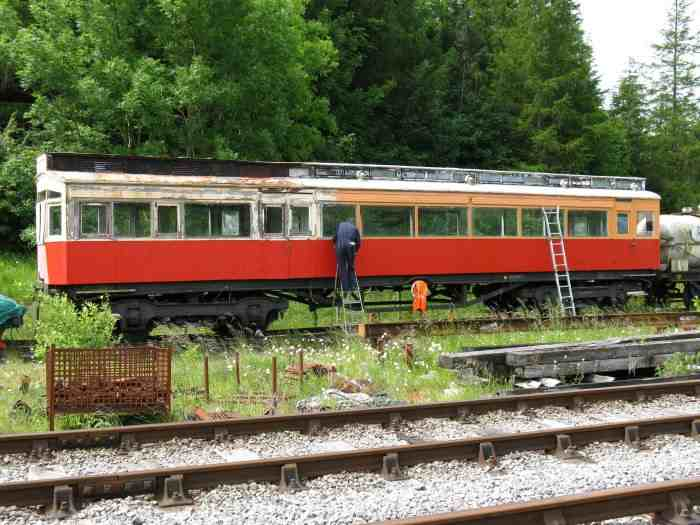
Autocar 3170 under restoration

The body of No. 3170 was fitted with a tin roof and verandah on a site near Kirkbymoorside, which protected it from the effects of the weather, although it had ceased to be used as a holiday home some time before 2003, when it was bought for preservation by Stephen Middleton, a restorer of vintage carriages. The body was put into storage while Middleton searched for suitable bogies and an underframe. Once these had been found, a charitable trust was formed to manage the restoration. The trust is a collaboration between Middleton, the Embsay and Bolton Abbey Steam Railway and Beamish Museum. Most of the restoration work took place at the Embsay and Bolton Abbey Railway, and the trust were also given NER autocoach No. 3453 by the NER coach group, based at the North Yorkshire Moors Railway. The coach was fitted with suitable control equipment, allowing the trust to run an Edwardian two-car multiple unit.

The trust were unable to find a suitable heritage engine to power the vehicle, and decided to use a new 225 hp (168 kW) Cummins diesel engine. The original power bogie was manufactured by Fox, but none of these survive, and so a bogie from a Southern Region Class 416 unit was acquired. The motors fitted to this are compatible with modern generators and control equipment. Fox lightweight bogies were sourced for the non-powered end and the two on the trailer coach. An underframe for the vehicle was obtained from the North Norfolk Railway. It had been built as a milk brake wagon, no. 2391, for the Great Northern Railway in 1921, although it was later converted to a crane runner wagon.

Several grants were obtained to fund the restoration of the autocar and the associated trailer coach. The largest grant of £465,800 was awarded by the Heritage Lottery Fund in March 2011. £20,000 came from PRISM (the fund for the PReservation of Industrial and Scientific Material) for the restoration of the bodywork of the two vehicles, while the Ken Hoole Trust awarded the project £5,000, which was used towards the restoration of the woodwork. Costs overran, due in part to additional work needed on the chassis once it had been stripped and its condition assessed. In December 2014, the Transport Trust granted the Trust a loan facility of up to £46,000 to cover any shortfall, to be repaid once the vehicles were operational.

Restoration work started in early 2011. Work on the chassis was carried out at Quorn on the Great Central Railway, which was moved to Loughborough on 8 January 2015 where the power unit was fitted. Test runs of the completed chassis were carried out between Loughborough and Quorn from 17 March 2016, and it was moved to Embsay on 17 May, for the body to be attached. Work on the body and the autocoach took place at Embsay, and the coach which had been stabled at Levisham for many years was substantially restored by September 2018. The autocar officially re-entered service on 19 October 2018, when it towed the autocoach, although passengers only rode in the autocar, as the braking system on the coach still needed to be completed. The project was awarded the Peter Manisty Award for Excellence at the 2019 Heritage Railway Awards ceremony, in recognition of its "exceptional and outstanding contribution to railway preservation".

== Modelling the autocar ==
Following the renewed interest in the petrol-electric autocars after the founding of the Trust, two manufacturers make model kits of the autocars. In 2 mm and 4 mm (OO Gauge) scales, Worsley Works makes an etched brass kit of the body. 3 mm scale etches have also been produced to order. In 7 mm (O Gauge), NER Days makes a kit in nickel-silver.

Rails of Sheffield in partnership with the Danish model railway company Heljan produced three ready-to-run models of the autocar in 00 Gauge. Cars 3170 and 3171 are available in NER red and cream livery, while car 3170 is also available in the LNER brown livery which it carried from 1923 to 1931.

== See also ==
- British railcars and diesel multiple units
