= British steam railcars =

Self-propelled railcar powered by a steam engine

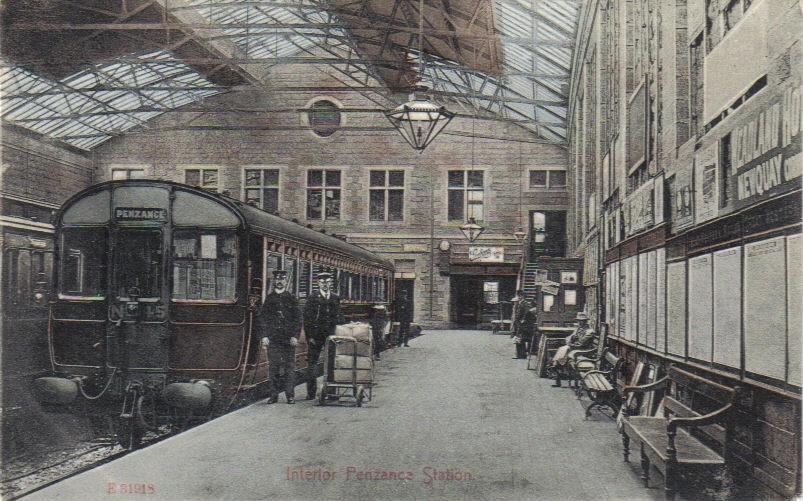
Steam railmotor 45 at Penzance railway station. Tinted postcard photograph, c.1915.

A steam railcar is a rail vehicle that does not require a locomotive as it contains its own steam engine. The first steam railcar was an experimental unit designed and built in 1847 by James Samuel and William Bridges Adams. In 1848, they made the Fairfield steam carriage that they sold to the Bristol and Exeter Railway, who used it for two years on a branch line.

Railcars were built in the early 20th century for the London and South Western Railway (LSWR) and before entering passenger service one was lent to the Great Western Railway (GWR). Between 1902 and 1911, 197 steam railcars were built, 99 by the GWR.

Introduced either due to competition from the new electric tramways or to provide an economic service on lightly used country branch lines, there were two main designs, either a powered bogie enclosed in a rigid body or an articulated engine unit and carriage, pivoting on a pin. However, with little reserve power steam railcars were inflexible and the ride quality was poor due to excessive vibration and oscillation. Most were replaced by an autotrain, adapted carriages and a push-pull steam locomotive as these were able to haul additional carriages or goods wagons.

After trials in 1924, the London and North Eastern Railway and the London, Midland and Scottish Railway purchased between them a total of 102 railcars using high speed steam motors from Sentinel-Cammell and Claytons in the late 1920s. These had all been withdrawn by 1947.

== Origins ==
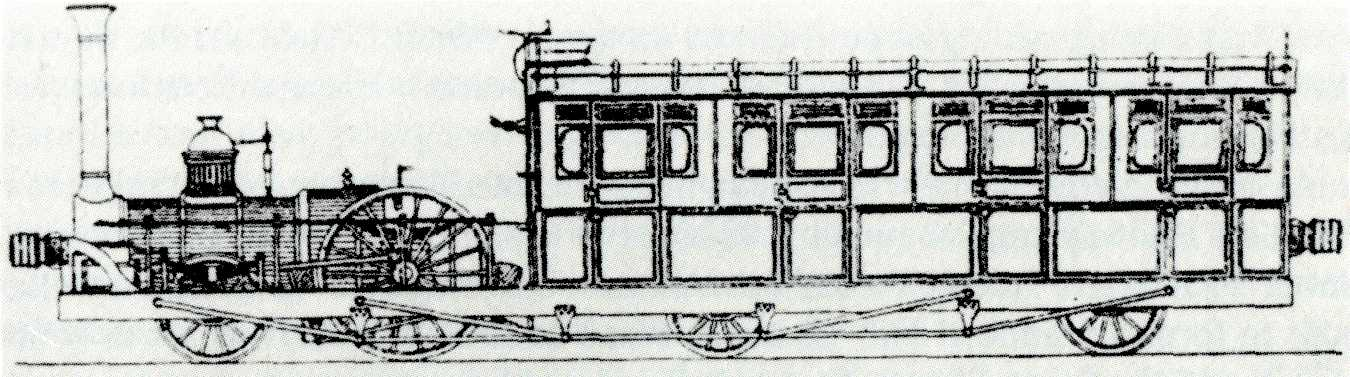
Steam railcar Enfield built by William Adams for the Eastern Counties Railway in 1849.

The first steam railcar was designed by James Samuel, the Eastern Counties Railway Locomotive Engineer, built by William Bridges Adams in 1847, and trialled between Shoreditch and Cambridge on 23 October 1847. An experimental unit, 12 feet 6 inches (3.81 m) long with a small vertical boiler and passenger accommodation was a bench seat around a box at the back, although it was officially named Lilliputian it was known as Express.

The following year, Samuel and Adams built the Fairfield steam carriage. This was much larger, 31 feet 6 inches (9.60 m) long, and built with an open third class section and a closed second class section. After trials in 1848, it was sold to the Bristol and Exeter Railway and adapted for the 7-foot gauge and the body rebuilt to seat 16 in first-class and 32 in second-class. It ran for two years on the Tiverton Branch Line before the engine was converted to a 0-4-0 locomotive.

Enfield, combining a contemporary designs of engine and carriage, was larger still. Built by Samuel and Adams this was used in regular service by the Eastern Counties Railway until the engine was converted into a 2-2-2 tank locomotive. More engine and carriage combinations to Samuel designs were built in the 1850s in the Eastern Counties railway works, and another by Kitson & Co. called Ariel's Girdle. Later, in 1869, Samuel, Robert Fairlie and George England collaborated to build a prototype articulated steam railcar at England's Hatcham Ironworks that was demonstrated in the works yard. However, England went out of business at about this time and nothing is known about the fate of this vehicle.

== Railmotors ==
=== Design ===
The steam railcar was revived in 1902 when Dugald Drummond of the London and South Western Railway (LSWR) built two for a branch line near Portsmouth. Steam railcars were introduced for two main reasons, either to compete with the new electric tramways that were abstracting traffic away in suburban areas or to provide an economic service on lightly used country branch lines. To allow for inexpensive low-level halts steps were provided, interlocked with the brakes so the train could not move with them extended.

There were two main designs, either with a powered bogie enclosed in a rigid body, or the engine unit and carriage were articulated, pivoting on a pin. The steam boiler could be enclosed or left open and was generally open on the articulated units and enclosed on the rigid bodies. Higher maintenance requirements of the engine meant some companies had more locomotive units than carriages.

The steam railcar had a driving position at both ends so it could run in either direction without being turned, or for a locomotive to run round its carriages at a terminus. Control from the rear end was normally by a wheel connected to the regulator by a continuous wire in or above the roof space or a rod running under the floor. The driver was provided with brake and whistle controls, and some means of communicating with the fireman, who stayed on the footplate. This was normally by a bell code and required a 'passed fireman' who was qualified to act as driver. Unpowered carriages could also be attached and some had control equipment.

With passenger accommodation in open saloons, the units were usually vacuum braked, steam heated and provided with gas lighting, although electric lighting was fitted to some units. However, there was little reserve power for additional carriages and therefore the cars were inflexible during busy hours, especially on the articulated types. The ride quality was poor on some due to a lack of proper suspension between the engine unit and the carriage body causing excessive vibration and oscillation for some rail motors. Most steam railcars were replaced by an autotrain, a push-pull steam locomotive and carriages.

=== London and South Western Railway ===
To provide an economic service on the LSWR and London, Brighton and South Coast Railway (LB&SCR) joint branch from Fratton to Southsea two steam railmotors were built by the LSWR in 1902, entering service in April 1903, and designated as K11 Class. The 43-foot (13 m) long carriage seated 30 in third class and 12 in first class and the total length of the vehicle was 53 ft 5 in (16.28 m). The first unit was lent to the Great Western Railway, returning with favourable reports. However, when introduced in summer 1903 the units struggled with passengers on the gradients on the line and it was discovered that the GWR had trialed the unit on level track and without passengers. The units were rebuilt with a bigger firebox and boiler.

These were followed by fifteen more railmotors for the LSWR system. The first two were built in 1904, the engines at Nine Elms and the carriages at Eastleigh and were designated H12 class. These were 2 ft (0.61 m) shorter than the earlier cars and seated 8 in first class and 32 in third. Thirteen more were built in 1905–6 to slightly different design, as class H13. These had the boiler pressure increased from 150 psi (1.0 MPa) to 175 psi (1.21 MPa). Engines and carriages were not detachable and these units were capable of towing an additional carriage. After the outbreak of World War I limited the work available for railmotors the joint stock was taken out of service in 1914 and by 1916 only three units remained in service, to be withdrawn in 1919.

=== Great Western Railway ===
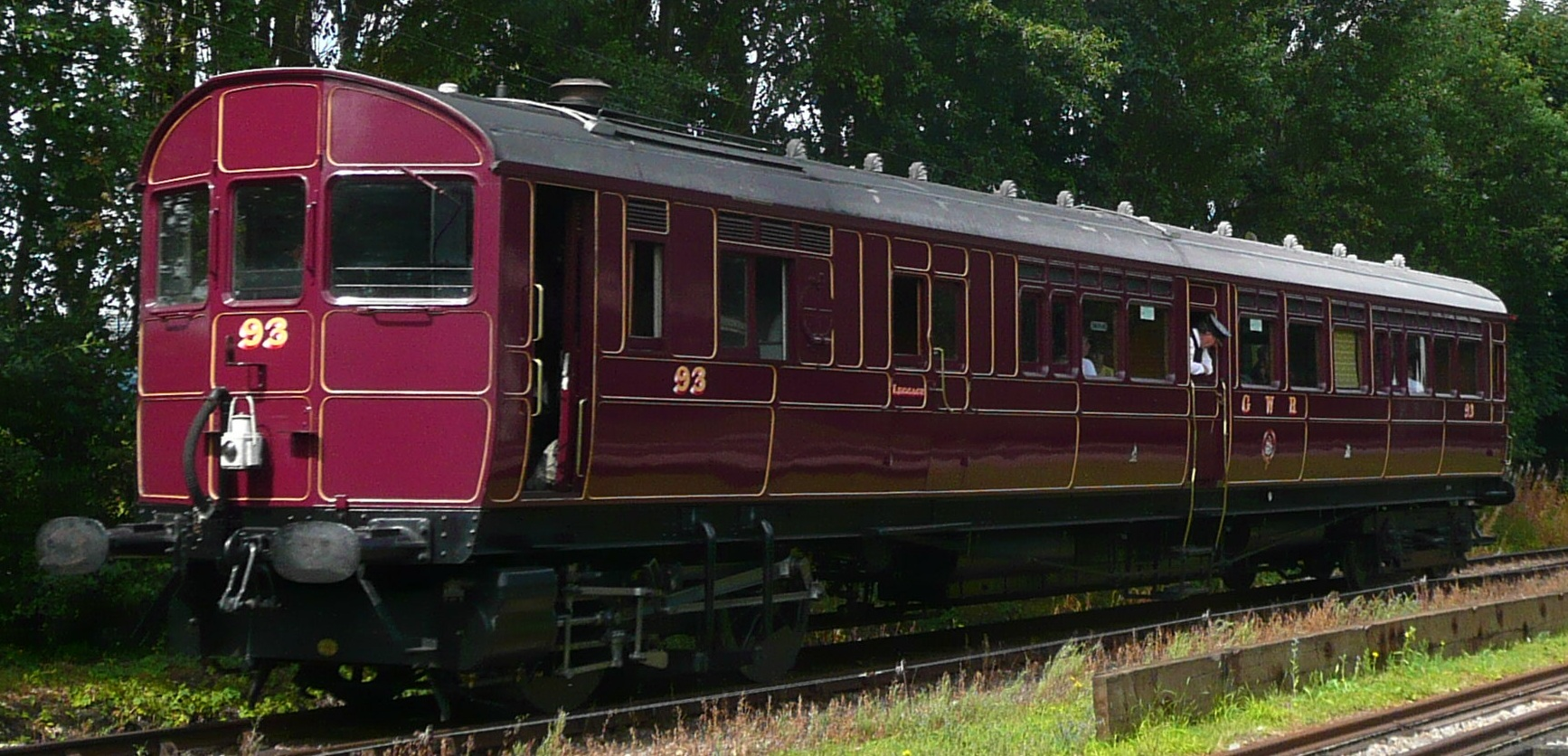
Rebuilt GWR steam railmotor in 2012

After the trials with the L&SWR railmotor, in 1903 the GWR designed and built two prototypes and by 1908 had 99 carriages and 112 engine units. Although there were detail differences between carriages there were six basic types: the prototypes were the only examples 57 feet (17 m) long and in 1905 two railmotors (numbered 15 and 16) arrived from Kerr, Stuart and Company. These were unlike the others, of the articulated type and to the outline design of Tom Hurry Riches of the Taff Vale Railway but with locomotive style boilers. The other carriages were either 59 feet 6 inches (18.14 m) or 70 feet (21 m) long and designed for branch or suburban use, the branch cars having a separate luggage compartment. There were between 49 and 64 seats and two cars had corridor connections at both ends.

The engines, apart for the two for the Kerr, Stuart cars, were all interchangeable, although there were minor differences in the heating surface, wheel diameter and tractive effort. These were equipped with a swing arm suspension that was effective in damping out the vibration typical of steam railcars.

Withdrawals started in 1914, services being replaced by autotrains. Three were sold and one was destroyed in a fire but most were converted into trailers. However, by the 1923 grouping 53 remained in service and it was October 1935 before they were all withdrawn.

As of 2012 a reconstructed GWR steam railmotor built in 1908 is operational and based at Didcot Railway Centre.

=== Taff Vale Railway ===
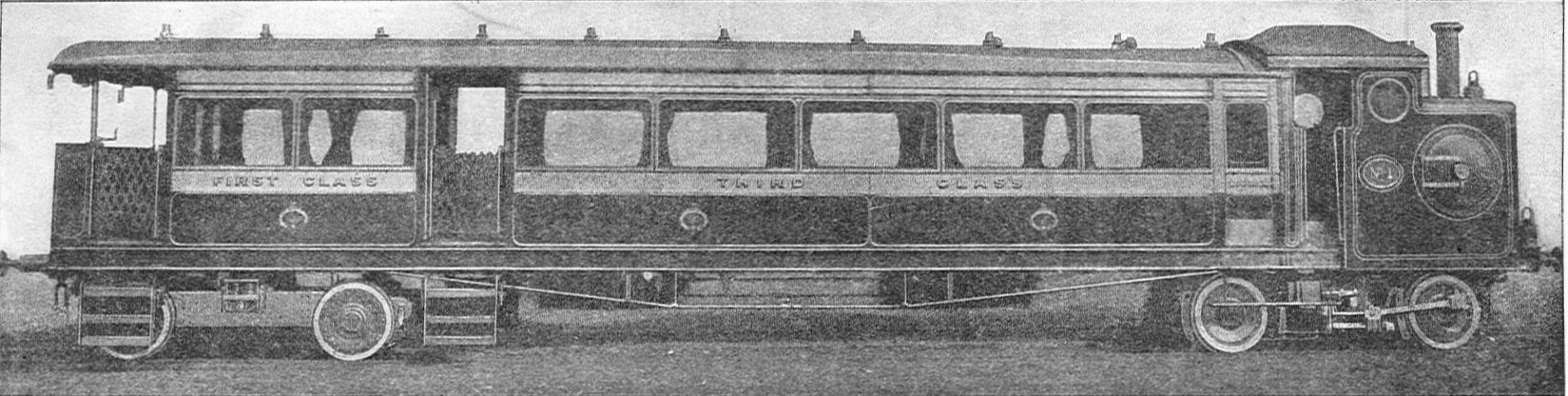
Taff Vale railmotor

Riches, the Taff Vale Railway's locomotive engineer, designed in 1903 the first articulated railmotor with the boiler unusually placed across the frames with a single firebox and two short drums, this giving a high steam raising capacity. The engine unit and carriage pivoted on a pin, and the two parts could be separated in twenty minutes. The carriage had a third class saloon for 40 passengers and a first class compartment for 12 and an open rear driving position. This was followed by fifteen more: six in 1904, the engines built by Avonside Engine Co. and another six from Kerr, Stuart & Co. in 1905. The carriages built by the Bristol Wagon & Carriage Works were similar to the prototype except the open end was enclosed. In 1906 five engines were built by Manning Wardle & Co.; these were larger with entrances front and rear. Only three longer 53 feet 3 inches (16.23 m) carriages were purchased that year, allowing two spare engines for maintenance.

The railcars worked over most of the Taff Vale system, normally without a trailer. Eight of the carriages were converted into autocoaches between 1914 and 1916; all of the engine portions were out of use by the end of 1920 and withdrawn by the end of 1921, whilst the remaining eight coach portions were converted into ordinary coaches during 1921–22.

=== Lancashire and Yorkshire Railway ===
In 1905, the Lancashire and Yorkshire Railway (L&YR) received two railmotors from Kerr, Stuart similar to those they had supplied to the Taff Vale Railway. The carriages were built by the L&YR at Newton Heath on an under-frame built by Kerr, Stuart and seated 48 passengers in third class. The railmotors were considered underpowered by L&YR and soon the cylinders were bored out and fitted with new pistons.

As the requirement was to work with a trailer, George Hughes, the L&YR locomotive engineer redesigned the cars. Retaining the articulated concept, the engine units were given a larger locomotive style boiler and four coupled wheels giving a tractive effort of 8,080 lbf (35.9 kN). The carriage bodies seated 56 passengers and had corridor connections. Eighteen engine units and sixteen carriages were built between 1906 and 1911, the two original engines being withdrawn and replaced by ones of the new style in 1909. Twelve trailers, fitted with controls, were built. Being of the articulated type the ride quality was poor.

All eighteen were running when the L&YR were absorbed into the London, Midland and Scottish Railway (LMS) in the 1923 grouping, the first being withdrawn in 1927 and one was still running when the railways were nationalised in 1948.

=== South Eastern and Chatham Railway ===
In June 1904, the South Eastern and Chatham Railway (SECR) ordered two articulated steam railcars from Kitson and Company for the Sheppey Light Railway and the Strood - Chatham services, seating 56 in third class. They were delivered in February 1905. Initial cost savings prompted the order of six further units, delivered between March and May 1906, for use on a range of lightly used services, including the Hundred of Hoo Railway, the Dover - Sandgate services.

Subsequent experience found that they were not popular with the passengers or railwaymen and that maintenance was more costly. They began to be placed in store from June 1914, replaced by push-pull trains and SECR Class P 0-6-0 tanks. The last two in service on the Hastings - Rye service were laid aside in February 1920. However, the eight units were not officially withdrawn by the SECR but rather the Southern Railway in April 1924 when the locomotive units were scrapped and the carriage units converted for further use as steam hauled carriages.

=== London and North Western Railway ===
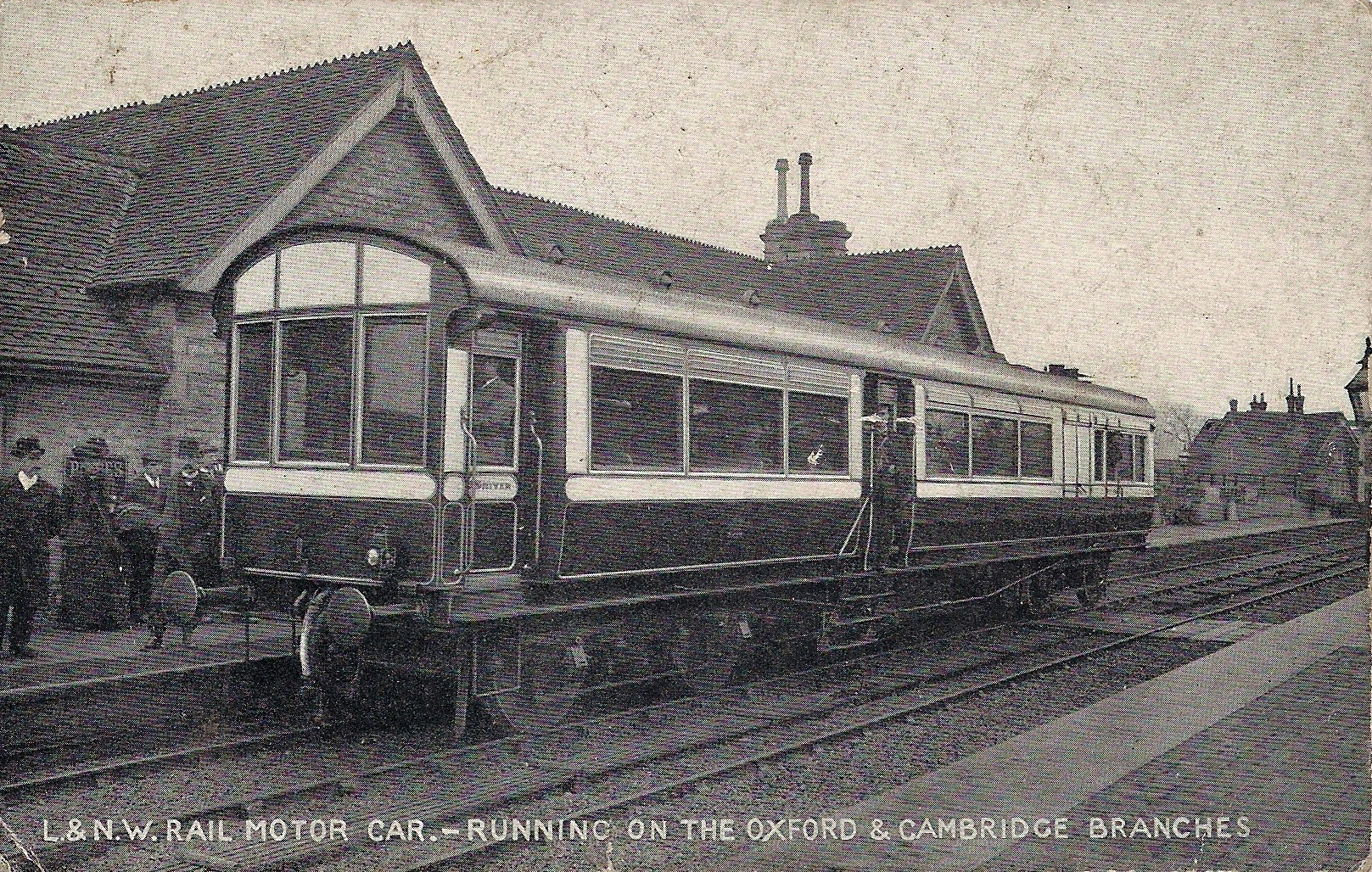
L&NWR railcar at Bicester Town

Between 1905 and 1907, the London and North Western Railway (LNWR) built six rigid steam railcars with a powered bogie that could be removed via double doors at the front end. Passenger accommodation was 48 in third class, the cars were fitted with electric lighting, and there was electric bell communication from the rear driving position and the footplate. All six were absorbed into the LMS fleet in 1923 and one, No. 3, survived to be nationalised in 1948, being withdrawn in February that year. The Great Northern Railway (GNR) had eight railmotors built in 1905, two were petrol driven and unsuccessful and six were articulated steam railcars. Built in pairs by different manufacturers to compare performance, no further units were built. The six steam railcars were absorbed into the London and North Eastern Railway (LNER) in the 1923 grouping and withdrawn between 1939 and 1948. The Port Talbot Railway's steam railmotor was surprisingly a six wheeler at the front.

=== London, Brighton and South Coast Railway ===
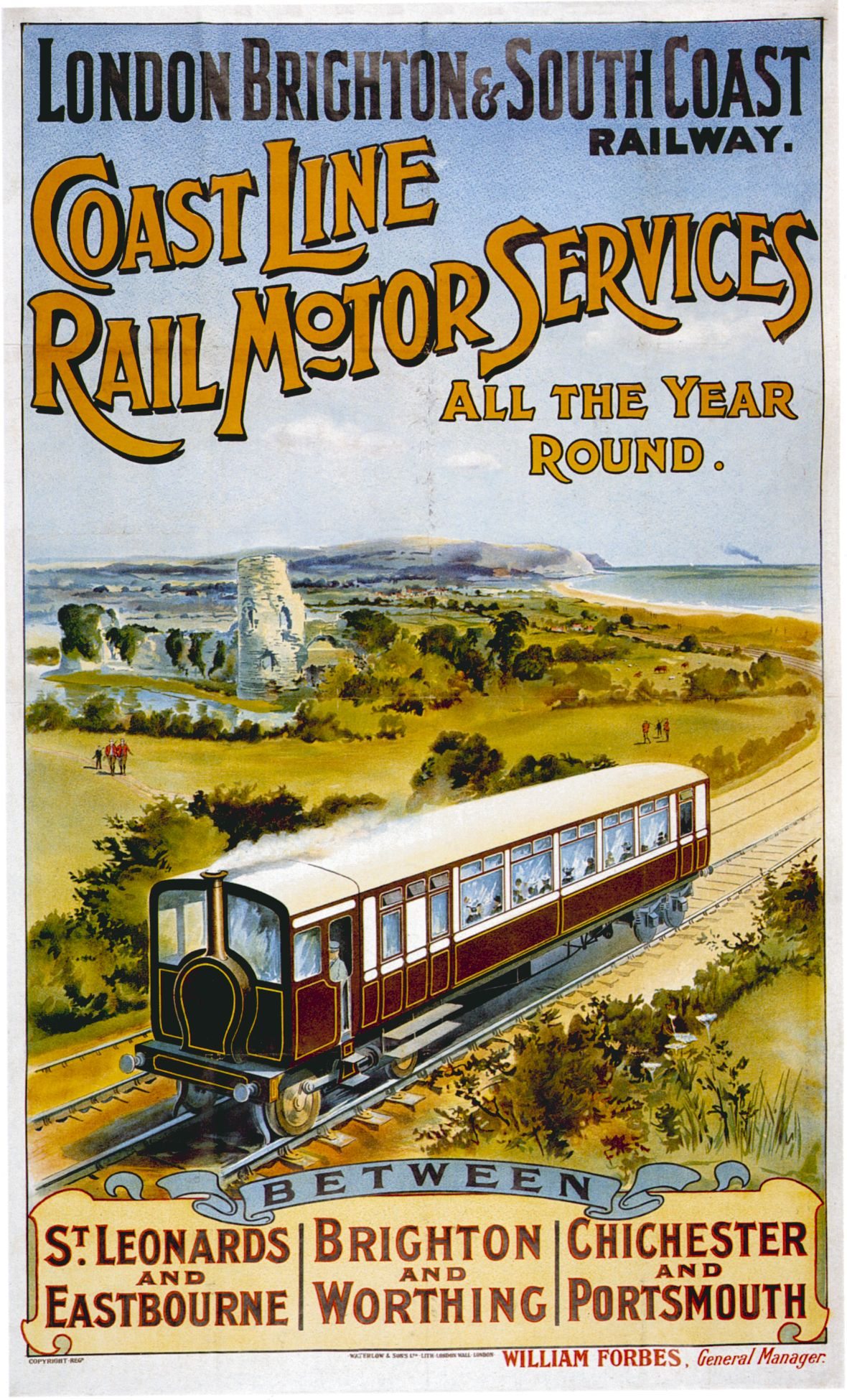
1906 poster advertising rail motor services

In addition to the joint railcars of 1903, the London, Brighton and South Coast Railway (LB&SCR) directors asked their Chief Mechanical Engineer, Robert Billinton, to investigate the use of steam or petrol railcars on lightly used services. Billinton died in 1904, before examples could be acquired, but in 1905 his successor Douglas Earle Marsh acquired two steam and two petrol railcars, for comparative purposes with small steam locomotives of the Stroudley A1 and D1 classes fitted for "motor train" or "push-pull" working. The steam railcars were built by Beyer, Peacock and Company and were of a similar design to those supplied by this company to the North Staffordshire Railway. They were stationed at Eastbourne and St Leonards and ran services on the East and West Sussex coast lines. They were both loaned to the War Department in 1918/19 before being sold to the Trinidad Government Railway. There they have never been put in operation. One of the coach parts was converted into the Governor's saloon and the other into a second class carriage.

=== Other railways ===
Between 1903 and 1911 a total of 21 railcars were introduced by another twelve railway companies.

Small steam railcar fleets
Railway	Number of railcars	Introduced	Withdrawn	Notes
Alexandra (Newport and South Wales) Docks and Railway	2	1904	1911; 1917	
Midland Railway	1 (Note: Rush mentions one, Jenkinson lists 2 units in a summary table.)	1904	1912? (Note: The unit worked the Morecambe and Heysham branch and was returned to Derby works when this line was electrified in 1908.)	
Glasgow and South Western Railway	3	1904–5	1915–16	
Great Central Railway	3	1904–5	1914	
Barry Railway	2	1905	1914 (Note: They were de-engined and converted to bogie open composite carriages according diagram 14.)	
North Staffordshire Railway	3	1905	1922	
Furness Railway	2	1905	1914	
Great North of Scotland Railway	2	1905	1909–10	
Isle of Wight Central Railway	1	1906	1912	
Port Talbot Railway	1	1907	1920 (Note: Sold to the Port of London Authority for use on the Millwall Extension Railway.)	
Rhymney Railway	2	1907	1909; 1919	
Cardiff Railway	2 (Note: A spare engine allowed for maintenance.)	1911	1917	
Nidd Valley Light Railway	1	1920 (Note: Purchased from the GWR.)	1937	
Millwall Extension Railway	3	1920 (Note: Two were bought from the GWR and one from the Port Talbot Railway)	1926	

== Geared steam railcars ==
=== Early examples ===
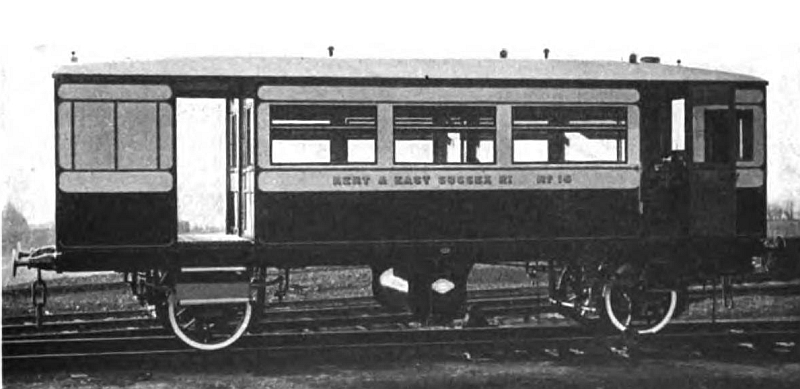
K&ESR No. 16 built in 1905

Other railcars used steam motors, high speed steam engines together with a form of gearing. In 1905, a four-wheeled vehicle was designed for the Kent and East Sussex Railway and built by RY Pickering. This could seat 31 passengers, but suffered poor ride quality and was taken out of use. It remained on the stock list when the railway was nationalised in 1948. Ganz of Budapest had designed a geared steam car and the Peebles Steam Car Co. was formed to promote the car in Britain with suggestions that the Hungarian Government Railway had purchased 300 units. Steam was raised at 300 psi (2.1 MPa) and supplied to a 35 hp (26 kW) two cylinder engine. In 1905, a prototype was built and two trial runs were made. It was reported that the ride quality was smooth, but the acceleration was moderate and the maximum speed was about 30 mph (48 km/h). No orders were placed and the steam car was shipped to the continent.

=== Sentinel–Cammell ===
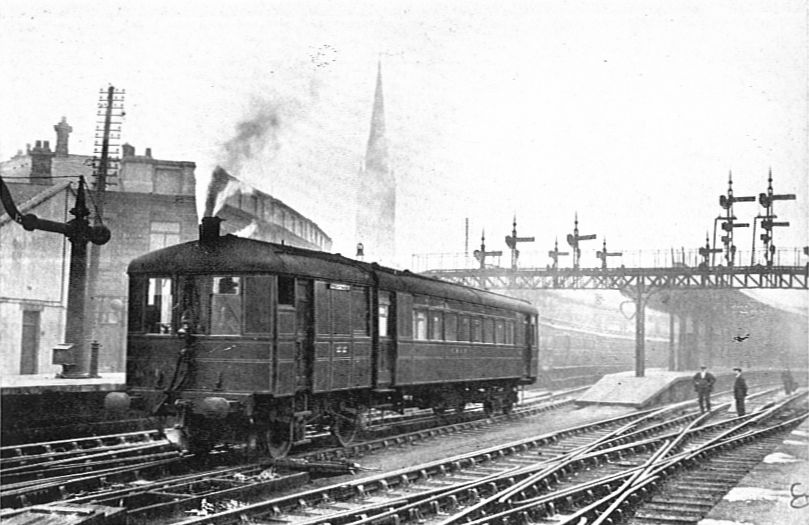
LNER Sentinel–Cammell steam railcar

In 1923, Sentinel Waggon Works and Cammell Laird collaborated to build a prototype lightweight steam rail car for the Jersey Railway. A range of Sentinel–Cammell railcars were developed with a choice of a single car or an articulated pair and a 100 hp (75 kW) motor or 200 hp (150 kW) with one boiler and two motors. A total of 290 were built for customers worldwide, 91 for use in Britain A boiler raised steam at 300 to 350 psi (2.1 to 2.4 MPa), feeding one or two steam motors. The first steam motors had two cylinders as were used on contemporary steam lorries but by 1925 a 6-cylinder version had been developed. In the early units, chains were used in final drive until a gearbox and cardan shaft drive was developed in 1927. In the early units the engine unit was articulated, enclosed in similar coachwork to the passenger section; the whole car was made of steel.

A car was shown at the British Empire Exhibition in 1924 and 1925 and tested by the LNER. To provide a better service to compete with raising levels of road traffic two of these articulated 100 hp (75 kW) two-cylinder chain-driven units were purchased, and operated in the Lowestoft area. This was followed by 22 cars to a similar design in 1927 and 1928. A prototype cardan shaft driven car with a rigid body was built in 1927 and between 1928 and 1930 forty-nine cars with six cylinder cardan shafts drives and rigid bodies were purchased, followed by five 200 hp (150 kW) cars in 1930 and 1932 and Phenomena, a twin articulated pair with two 100 hp six cylinder motors, in 1930. This could seat 39 in the power car and 83 in the trailer. Between 1927 and 1943, a number were allocated to Heaton shed, near Newcastle upon Tyne, and operated to Blackhill and over the Tyne Valley Line to North Wylam and Prudhoe. On 9 June 1929, railcar No. 220 Waterwitch overran signals at Marshgate Junction, Doncaster and was consequently in collision with an excursion train. The railcar was cut in two. It was not repaired.

The London, Midland and Scottish Railway (LMS) also purchased a prototype in 1925, followed by twelve in 1927 and a single six-cylinder car in 1928. The LNER had a joint interest in the Cheshire Lines Railway and the Axholme Joint Railway, so they purchased four cars and one car respectively. A lightweight railbus was built for the Southern Railway in 1933 and seated 44 passengers, was 48 ft 4 in (14.73 m) long and weighed 17 long tons 4 cwt (38,500 lb or 17.5 t). However, its frame broke when heavily overloaded in 1935 and although repaired, it was withdrawn in 1936.

Most of the LMS railcars were withdrawn in 1935, the last being the six-cylindered car, this being withdrawn in December 1936. The last LNER Sentinel railcar was withdrawn in 1947.

=== Clayton ===
In 1927, a prototype steam railcar was built by Clayton Wagons Ltd for the LNER. This was similar to the earlier Sentinel-Cammell cars, but with the coal bunker was outside the car on the powered bogie. A further ten were delivered in 1928, six new to the Heaton shed, later joined by seventh. One car was delivered in the teak LNER coach livery, but painted red and cream in February 1929; the others arrived in this livery. The railcars worked services to Morpeth, Leamside and Blackhill. One car was withdrawn in 1932, one was transferred to Norwich in 1935 and the other five were withdrawn in 1936. All railcars had been withdrawn by 1937.

== Notes and references ==
=== Bibliography ===
- Bradley, D.L. (1967). Locomotives of the London and South Western Railway. Part II. Lichfield, Staffs: Railway Correspondence and Travel Society Press.
- Bradley, D.L. (1974). Locomotives of the London Brighton and South Coast Railway. Part III. London: Railway Correspondence and Travel Society Press.
- Bradley, D.L. (1980). Locomotives of the South Eastern and Chatham Railway (2nd ed.). London: Railway Correspondence and Travel Society Press.
- Davies, F. K. (May 1956) [1952]. White, D. E. (ed.). The Locomotives of the Great Western Railway, part eleven: The Rail Motor Vehicles and Internal Combustion Locomotives (2nd ed.). RCTS. ISBN 0-901115-38-X. OCLC 655440794.
- Hedges, Martin, ed. (1980). 150 Years of British Railways. Hamlyn. ISBN 0-600-37655-9.
- Hoole, Ken (1982). Trains in Trouble: Vol. 3. Redruth: Atlantic Books. ISBN 0-906899-05-2.
- Hoole, K. (1986). Rail Centres: Newcastle. Ian Allan. ISBN 978-0-7110-1592-0.
- Jenkinson, David (1996). History of British Railway Carriages, 1900–53. Atlantic Transport. ISBN 978-1899816033.
- Rush, R.W (1971). British Steam Railcars. Oakwood Press. ISBN 0-85361-144-0.
- Tufnell, R.M. (1984). The British Railcar: AEC to HST. David and Charles. ISBN 0-7153-8529-1.
