= Locomotives of the Stockton and Darlington Railway =

Trains of a northern England company

The 1825 to 1863 Stockton and Darlington Railway (S&DR) was the world's first public railway to use steam locomotives. Its first line connected collieries near Shildon with Stockton-on-Tees and Darlington, and was officially opened on 27 September 1825. While coal waggons were hauled by steam locomotives from the start, passengers were carried in coaches drawn by horses until carriages hauled by steam locomotives were introduced in 1833.

The company was taken over by the North Eastern Railway in 1863, transferring 200 route miles (320 route kilometres) of line and about 160 locomotives, but continued to operate independently as the Darlington Section until 1876. The opening of the S&DR was seen as proof of the effectiveness of steam railways and its anniversary was celebrated in 1875, 1925 and 1975. Much of the original route is now served by the Tees Valley Line, operated by Northern.

Locomotives were sometimes renumbered, and the old numbers re-used for new locomotives. The following list does not include all renumberings.

Number	Name	Wheels	Designer	Builder	Date introduced	Comments
1	Active, later Locomotion No. 1	0-4-0	G & R Stephenson	Robert Stephenson and Company	1825	Preserved at Darlington
1 (2nd)	—	0-6-0		Darlington railway works	1868	
2	Hope	0-4-0	G & R Stephenson	Robert Stephenson and Company	1825	
2 (2nd)	Graham	0-6-0		William and Alfred Kitching	1849	
2 (3rd)	—	0-6-0		Darlington railway works	1865	
3	Black Diamond	0-4-0	G & R Stephenson	Robert Stephenson and Company	1826	
3 (2nd)	Times	0-6-0		William and Alfred Kitching	1849	
3 (3rd)	—	0-6-0		Darlington railway works	1865	
4 (1st)	Diligence	0-4-0	G & R Stephenson	Robert Stephenson and Company	1826	
4 (2nd)	Stockton	0-6-0	Timothy Hackworth	Fossick & Hackworth	1841	
4 (3rd)	—	0-6-0		Darlington railway works	1870	
5 (1st)	Stockton	0-2-2-0	?	Robert Wilson and Co	1826	nicknamed Chittaprat. First British locomotive with four cylinders.
5 (2nd)	Royal George	0-6-0	Timothy Hackworth	Soho Works, Shildon	1827	(rebuilt from Chittaprat)
5 (3rd)	Hope Town	0-6-0		William and Alfred Kitching	1841	
5 (4th)	—	0-6-0		Darlington railway works	1869	
6 (1st)	Experiment (Note: Not Experiment by Richard Roberts)	0-4-0	G & R Stephenson	Robert Stephenson and Company	1826	
6 (2nd)	Despatch	0-6-0	Timothy Hackworth	Hackworth & Downing	1839	later no. 10
6 (3rd)	—	0-6-0		Darlington railway works	1869	
7 (1st)	Rocket (Note: Not the better-known Stephenson's Rocket)	0-6-0	Robert Stephenson?	Robert Stephenson and Company	1829	
7 (2nd)	Prince	0-6-0		Shildon railway works	1842	
7 (3rd)	—	0-6-0		Darlington railway works	1869	
8 (1st)	Victory	0-6-0	Timothy Hackworth	Shildon railway works	1829	
8 (2nd)	Leader (Note: Not SR Leader class)	0-6-0	Timothy Hackworth	Shildon railway works	1842	
8 (3rd)	—	0-6-0		Darlington railway works	1869	
9 (1st)	Globe	0-4-0	Timothy Hackworth	Robert Stephenson and Company	1830	
9 (2nd)	Middlesbrough	0-6-0		William Lister & Co.	1840	
9 (3rd)	—	0-6-0		Hopkins, Gilkes & Co.	1865	
10 (1st)	Planet	2-2-0	Robert Stephenson	Robert Stephenson and Company	1830	
10 (2nd)	Auckland	0-6-0	Timothy Hackworth	Hackworth & Downing	1839	later no. 6
10 (3rd)	—	0-6-0		Darlington railway works	1870	
11 (1st)	North Star	2-2-0	Robert Stephenson	Robert Stephenson and Company	1830	
11 (2nd)	North Star	2-2-0	Timothy Hackworth	Hackworth & Downing	1837	
11 (3rd)	—	0-6-0		Darlington railway works	1869	
12 (1st)	Majestic	0-6-0	Timothy Hackworth	Stephenson/Hawthorn (Note: Construction of the Majestic and Wilberforce classes (nos. 12-23) was allocated equally to Robert Stephenson and Company and R and W Hawthorn)	1831	
12 (2nd)	Briton	0-6-0	Timothy Hackworth	Shildon railway works	1837	
12 (3rd)	Trader	0-6-0	Timothy Hackworth	Shildon railway works	1842	(rebuilt from Briton)
12 (4th)	—	0-6-0		Darlington railway works	1868	
13 (1st)	Coronation	0-6-0	Timothy Hackworth	Stephenson/Hawthorn	1831	
13 (2nd)	Ocean	0-6-0		William Lister & Co.	1840	
14 (1st)	William IV	0-6-0	Timothy Hackworth	Stephenson/Hawthorn	1831	
14 (2nd)	Tees	0-6-0	Timothy Hackworth	William and Alfred Kitching	1837	
15 (1st)	Northumbrian	0-6-0	Timothy Hackworth	Stephenson/Hawthorn	1831	
15 (2nd)	Tory	0-6-0	Timothy Hackworth	Hackworth & Downing	1838	
15 (3rd)	—	0-6-0		Darlington railway works	1869	
16 (1st)	Director	0-6-0	Timothy Hackworth	Robert Stephenson and Company	1832	
16 (2nd)	Stanhope	0-6-0		William and Alfred Kitching	1845	
16 (3rd)	—	0-6-0		Darlington railway works	1870	
17 (1st)	Lord Brougham	0-6-0	Timothy Hackworth	Stephenson/Hawthorn	1831	
17 (2nd)	Whig	0-6-0	Timothy Hackworth	William and Alfred Kitching	1838	
17 (3rd)	—	0-6-0		Darlington railway works	1870	
18 (1st)	Shildon	0-6-0	Timothy Hackworth	Stephenson/Hawthorn	1831	
18 (2nd)	Etherley	0-6-0		William Lister & Co.	1840	
19	Darlington	0-6-0	Timothy Hackworth	R and W Hawthorn	1832	
20	Adelaide	0-6-0	Timothy Hackworth	Robert Stephenson and Company	1832	
21	Earl Grey	0-6-0	Timothy Hackworth	R and W Hawthorn	1832	
22 (1st)	Lord Durham	0-6-0	Timothy Hackworth	Robert Stephenson and Company	1832	
22 (2nd)	Alert	0-6-0		William and Alfred Kitching	1846	
22 (3rd)	—	0-6-0		Darlington railway works	1869	
23	Wilberforce	0-6-0	Timothy Hackworth	R and W Hawthorn	1833	
23 (2nd)	—	0-6-0		Hopkins, Gilkes & Co.	1865	
24 (1st)	Magnet	0-6-0	Timothy Hackworth	Shildon railway works	1835	The first locomotive built at Soho.
24 (2nd)	Skelton Castle	0-6-0		William and Alfred Kitching	1846	
24 (3rd)	—	0-6-0		Darlington railway works	1870	
25 (1st)	Enterprise	0-6-0	Timothy Hackworth	William and Alfred Kitching	1835	
25 (2nd)	Derwent	0-6-0	Timothy Hackworth	William and Alfred Kitching	1845	Preserved at Darlington
25 (3rd)	—	0-6-0		North Road Works, Darlington	1869	
26 (1st) (later 51)	Arrow	2-2-2	Timothy Hackworth	Shildon railway works	1837	
26 (2nd)	Pilot	0-6-0		William and Alfred Kitching	1840	
26 (3rd)	—	0-6-0		Darlington railway works	1868	
27 (1st)	Swift	0-4-0	Hawthorn	R and W Hawthorn	1836	
27 (2nd)	Whitton Castle	0-6-0		Neasham & Walsh	1840	
28 (later 43)	Sunbeam	2-2-0	Hawthorn	R and W Hawthorn	1837	
28 (2nd)	Conside	0-6-0		Hartlepool Iron Co.	1845	
28 (3rd)	—	0-6-0		Hopkins, Gilkes & Co.	1866	
29 (later 40)	Queen	0-4-0	William and Alfred Kitching	William and Alfred Kitching	1837	
29 (2nd)	Miner	0-6-0		Shildon railway works	1845	
30 (later 49)	Raby Castle	2-2-2	William and Alfred Kitching	William and Alfred Kitching	1839	
30 (2nd)	Wear	0-6-0		Shildon railway works	1845	
31 (1st)	Redcar	0-6-0	Hackworth/Bouch	Shildon railway works	1845	
31 (2nd)	—	0-6-0		Darlington railway works	1869	
32	Eldon	0-6-0	Hackworth/Bouch	Shildon railway works	1846	
33	Shildon	0-6-0	Hackworth/Bouch	Shildon railway works	1846	(Note: Baxter state Shildon was No. 38)
34	Driver	0-6-0	Hackworth/Bouch	Shildon railway works	1846	
35	Commerce	0-6-0	William Bouch	Shildon railway works	1847	
36 (1st)	Guisbro (Note: Baxter states name as Guisboro)	0-6-0	William Bouch	Shildon railway works	1847	
36 (2nd)	—	0-6-0		Darlington railway works	1870	
37	Gem	0-6-0	William Bouch	Shildon railway works	1847	
38	Rokeby	2-4-0	William Bouch	Shildon railway works	1847	
39	Ruby	2-4-0	William Bouch	Shildon railway works	1847	
40 (1st)	Queen	0-4-0	Kitching	William and Alfred Kitching	1837	formerly no.29
40 (2nd)	—	0-6-0		Hopkins, Gilkes & Co.	1866	
41	Dart	0-4-0	Timothy Hackworth	Shildon railway works	1839	
42 (1st)	London	0-4-0	J Hague?	John Hague?	1839	
42 (2nd)	—	0-6-0		Hopkins, Gilkes & Co.	1866	
43 (1st)	Sunbeam	2-2-0	Hawthorn	R and W Hawthorn	1837	formerly no.28
43 (2nd)	—	0-6-0		Hopkins, Gilkes & Co.	1866	
44 (1st)	Sun	2-2-0	Edward Bury	William Fairbairn (Note: Baxter states built by Jones, Turner and Evans.)	1844	Acquired from the Midland Railway in November 1844 for £250, ex MR 112, né Midland Counties Railway 4 Sunbeam, built 1839.
44 (2nd)	—	0-6-0		Darlington railway works	1868	
45	Gannymede	0-4-0	Edward Bury	William Fairbairn	1844	Acquired from the Midland Railway in November 1844 for £250, ex MR 84, né Midland Counties Railway 41 Ganymede, built 1840.
46 (1st)	Antelope	2-2-0	Edward Bury	Edward Bury	1844	Acquired from the Midland Railway in November 1844 for £250, ex MR 122, né Midland Counties Railway 14 Antelope, built 1840.
46 (2nd)	—	0-6-0		Hopkins, Gilkes & Co.	1866	
47	Unicorn	2-2-0	Edward Bury	Edward Bury	1844	Acquired from the Midland Railway in November 1844 for £3250, ex MR 123, né Midland Counties Railway 15 Unicorn, built 1840.
48	Active	0-4-2	Kitching	Kitching	1844	
49 (1st)	Raby Castle	2-2-2	Kitching	William and Alfred Kitching	1839	Formerly No. 30
49 (2nd)	—	0-6-0		Hopkins, Gilkes & Co.	1866	
50	Meteor	2-2-2	William Bouch	Shildon Works	1842 (Note: Baxter states built in July 1843)	
51 (1st)	Arrow	2-2-2	Timothy Hackworth	Shildon railway works	1837	formerly no.26
51 (2nd)	—	0-6-0		Hopkins, Gilkes & Co.	1866	
52	Comet	2-2-2	Kirtley	Kirtley (Note: This may be Thomas Kirtley whose company, Thomas Kirtley and Co., built locomotives from 1837 to 1841)	1841	
53 (1st)	Manchester	2-2-2	Sharp, Roberts and Company	Sharp, Roberts and Company	1840	
53 (2nd)	—	0-6-0		Darlington railway works	1867	
54	Tyneside	2-2-2	Robert Stephenson and Company	Robert Stephenson and Company	1842	
55	Wolsingham	0-4-2	William and Alfred Kitching	William and Alfred Kitching	1847	
56 (1st)	Shotley (Note: Baxter states that some sources have the names of Nos. 56 and 57 reversed)	0-6-0		Gilkes Wilson and Company	1852	
56 (2nd)	—	0-6-0		Darlington railway works	1866	
57 (1st)	Tow Law	0-6-0		Gilkes Wilson and Company	1852	
57 (2nd)	—	0-6-0		Darlington railway works	1866	
58	Woodlands	2-4-0		William and Alfred Kitching	1848	
59	Hallgarth	2-4-0		William and Alfred Kitching	1848	
60	Cleveland	0-6-0	J. Graham (Note: Possibly John Graham who joined the Stockton and Darlington Railway in 1831 and was Traffic Manager until 1849)	Gilkes Wilson and Company	1848	
61	Star	0-6-0	J. Graham	Gilkes Wilson and Company	1849	
62	Southend	0-6-0	J. Graham	Gilkes Wilson and Company	1849	
63	Birkbeck	0-6-0	W. Bouch	Shildon railway works	1849	
64	Larchfield	0-6-0	W. Bouch	Shildon railway works	1849	
65	Newmarket or Stephenson	2-4-0	Robert Stephenson?	Gilkes Wilson and Company	1850	
66	Priam	2-4-0	Robert Stephenson?	Gilkes Wilson and Company	1847	
67	Orion	2-4-0	Robert Stephenson?	Gilkes Wilson and Company	1848	
68	Brunswick	2-4-0	Robert Stephenson?	Gilkes Wilson and Company	1850	
69	Clarendon	2-4-0	Robert Stephenson?	Gilkes Wilson and Company	1850	
70	Alarm	2-4-0	Robert Stephenson?	Gilkes Wilson and Company	1851	
71	Hackworth	2-4-0		Alfred Kitching	1851	
72	Peel	0-6-0		Gilkes Wilson and Company	1852	
73	Aberdeen	0-6-0		Gilkes Wilson and Company	1852	
74	Eperor	0-6-0		Gilkes Wilson and Company	1853	
75	Baring	0-6-0		Gilkes Wilson and Company	1853	
76	Prince of Wales	0-6-0		Gilkes Wilson and Company	1854	
77	Alexander	0-6-0		Gilkes Wilson and Company	1854	
78	Lonsdale	2-4-0		Robert Stephenson and Company	1854	Acquired from Whitehaven and Furness Junction Railway in March 1854; ex W&FJ 1 Lonsdale, built 1846.
79	Carlisle	2-4-0		Robert Stephenson and Company	1854	Acquired from Whitehaven and Furness Junction Railway in March 1854; ex W&FJ 2 Carlisle, built 1846.
80	Duke	0-6-0		Shildon railway works	1854	
81 (1st)	Hawthorn	0-6-0		R and W Hawthorn	1855	Acquired from Edinburgh and Glasgow Railway in March 1855; ex E&G 40, built 1847–1848.
81 (2nd)	—	0-6-0		Hopkins, Gilkes & Co.	1867	
82	Miller	0-6-0		R and W Hawthorn	1855	Acquired from Edinburgh and Glasgow Railway in March 1855; ex E&G 41, built 1847–1848.
83	Victoria	0-6-0		Gilkes Wilson and Company	1854	
84	Albert	0-6-0		Gilkes Wilson and Company	1854	
85	Hardinge	0-6-0		Gilkes Wilson and Company	1854	
—	—	0-4-2		William Fairbairn	—	Acquired from Lancashire and Yorkshire Railway; ex L&Y 143, né Manchester and Leeds Railway 43, built 1842; not put into stock.
86	Zetland	0-6-0		R and W Hawthorn	1854	Acquired from Lancashire and Yorkshire Railway in November 1854; ex L&Y 219, né Blackburn, Darwen and Bolton Railway 4, built 1847–1848.
87	Fryerage	0-4-0	Edward Bury	Edward Bury & Co.	1854	Acquired from Lancashire and Yorkshire Railway in November 1854; ex L&Y 154–156, né Manchester and Leeds Railway 47 West Riding Union, built 1845.
88	Deanery	0-4-0	Edward Bury	Edward Bury & Co.	1854	Acquired from Lancashire and Yorkshire Railway in November 1854; ex L&Y 154–156, né Manchester and Leeds Railway 48 Cleckheaton, built 1845.
89	Huddersfield	0-4-0	Edward Bury	Edward Bury & Co.	1854	Acquired from Lancashire and Yorkshire Railway in November 1854; ex L&Y 154–156, né Manchester and Leeds Railway 49, built 1846.
90	Merchant	0-6-0		Gilkes Wilson and Company	1855	
91	Australia	0-6-0		Gilkes Wilson and Company	1855	
92	Yarm	0-6-0		Gilkes Wilson and Company	1855	
93 (1st)	Uranus	2-2-2		B. Hick and Sons	1855	Acquired from Edinburgh and Glasgow Railway in March 1855; ex E&G 42, built 1847.
93 (2nd)	Uranus	0-6-0		Darlington railway works	1867	
94 (1st)	Neptune	2-2-2		B. Hick and Sons	1855	Acquired from Edinburgh and Glasgow Railway in March 1855; ex E&G 43, built 1847.
93 (2nd)	Neptune	0-6-0		Darlington railway works	1867	
95	Elephant	0-6-0		Gilkes Wilson and Company	1855	
96	Middleton	0-6-0		Gilkes Wilson and Company	1855	
97	Gainford	0-6-0		Gilkes Wilson and Company	1855	
98	Pierremont	2-4-0		William and Alfred Kitching	1855	
99	Ayton	2-4-0	Alfred Kitching	Gilkes Wilson (Note: Baxter states built by Shildon Works)	1855	
100	Stobart	2-4-0 (Note: Baxter notes that Lowe records this locomotive as an 0-6-0)		Shildon railway works	1855	
101	Marske	2-4-0		William and Alfred Kitching	1855	
102	Cotherstone	0-6-0		Gilkes Wilson and Company	1855	
103	Darlington	0-6-0		Gilkes Wilson and Company	1855	
104	Durham	0-6-0		Gilkes Wilson and Company	1855	
105	Teesdale	0-6-0		Gilkes Wilson and Company	1855	
106	Staindrop	0-6-0		Gilkes Wilson and Company	1856	
107	Barnard Castle	0-6-0		Gilkes Wilson and Company	1856	
108	Eagle	0-6-0		R and W Hawthorn	1856	
109	Falcon	0-6-0		R and W Hawthorn	1856	
110	Hawk	0-6-0		R and W Hawthorn	1856	
111	Stag	0-6-0		R and W Hawthorn	1856	
112	Lion	0-6-0		R and W Hawthorn	1856	
113	Camel	0-6-0		R and W Hawthorn	1856	
114	Edward Pease	2-4-0		Robert Stephenson and Company	1856	
115	Maynell	2-4-0		Robert Stephenson and Company	1856	
116	Lartington	2-4-0	Alfred Kitching	Gilkes Wilson and Company	1856	
117	Nunthorpe	2-4-0	Alfred Kitching	Gilkes Wilson and Company	1856	
118	Elmfield	2-4-0	Alfred Kitching	Kitching & Co	1857	
119	Gretna	0-6-0		Gilkes Wilson and Company	1856	
120	Brough	0-6-0		Gilkes Wilson and Company	1856	
121	Tiger	0-6-0		Gilkes Wilson and Company	1857	
122	Kestrel	0-6-0		Gilkes Wilson and Company	1857	
123	Belle Vue	0-6-0		Gilkes Wilson and Company	1857	
124	Brookside	0-6-0		Gilkes Wilson and Company	1857	
125	Gazelle	0-6-0		Gilkes Wilson and Company	1858	
126	John Wakefield	0-6-0		Gilkes Wilson and Company	1858	
127	Polam	0-6-0		Gilkes Wilson and Company	1858	
128	East Mount	0-6-0		Gilkes Wilson and Company	1858	
129	Stanley	0-6-0		R and W Hawthorn	1858	
130	Hutton	0-6-0		R and W Hawthorn	1858	
131	Long Hall	0-6-0		R and W Hawthorn	1858	
132	Appleby	0-6-0		William and Alfred Kitching	1858	
133	Kirkby Stephen	0-6-0		William and Alfred Kitching	1858	
134	Kendal	0-6-0		Gilkes Wilson and Company	1858	
135	Eden	0-6-0		Shildon railway works	1858	
136	Tebay	0-6-0		Robert Stephenson and Company	1858	
137	Deepdale	0-6-0		Robert Stephenson and Company	1858	
138	Beelah	0-6-0		Robert Stephenson and Company	1858	
139	Crossfell	0-6-0		Gilkes Wilson and Company	1859	
140	Penrith	0-6-0		Gilkes Wilson and Company	1859	
141	Excelsior	0-6-0		Gilkes Wilson and Company	1859	
142	Wycliffe	0-6-0		Gilkes Wilson and Company	1859	
143	Windermere	0-6-0		Gilkes Wilson and Company	1859	
144	Ulleswater	0-6-0		Gilkes Wilson and Company	1860	
145	Panther	0-6-0		R and W Hawthorn	1860	
146	Ostrich	0-6-0		R and W Hawthorn	1860	
147	Leopard	0-6-0		R and W Hawthorn	1860	
148	Zebra	0-6-0		R and W Hawthorn	1860	
149	Fox	0-6-0		R and W Hawthorn	1860	
150	Mastiff	0-6-0		R and W Hawthorn	1860	
151	Mercury	0-6-0		Gilkes Wilson and Company	1860	
152	Venus	0-6-0		Gilkes Wilson and Company	1860	
153	Mars	0-6-0		Gilkes Wilson and Company	1860	
154	Jupiter	0-6-0		Gilkes Wilson and Company	1860	
155	Saturn	0-6-0		Gilkes Wilson and Company	1861	
156	Hershel	0-6-0		Gilkes Wilson and Company	1861	
157	Planet	0-6-0		Gilkes Wilson and Company	1861	
158	Lune	0-6-0		Gilkes Wilson and Company	1861	
159	York	0-6-0		Gilkes Wilson and Company	1862	
160	Brougham	4-4-0	William Bouch	Robert Stephenson and Company	1860	
161	Lowther	4-4-0	William Bouch	Robert Stephenson and Company	1860	
162	Saltburn	4-4-0	William Bouch	Robert Stephenson and Company	1862	
163	Morecambe	4-4-0	William Bouch	Robert Stephenson and Company	1862	
164	Belfast	4-4-0	William Bouch	Robert Stephenson and Company	1862	
165	Keswick	4-4-0	William Bouch	Robert Stephenson and Company	1862	
166	Oswald Gilkees	2-4-0		Kitching and Company	1860	
167	Newlands	0-6-0		Gilkes Wilson and Company	1862	
168	Clifton	0-6-0		Gilkes Wilson and Company	1862	
169	Tufton	0-6-0		Gilkes Wilson and Company	1863	
170	Reliance	0-6-0		Gilkes Wilson and Company	1864	
171	Gladstone	0-6-0		Shildon railway works	1863	
172	Barrow	0-6-0		Shildon railway works	1863	
173	London	0-6-0		Shildon railway works	1864	
174	John Dixon	0-6-0		Shildon railway works	1864	
175	Contractor	0-6-0		Darlington railway works	1864	First locomotive built at North Road.
176	Windsor	0-6-0		Robert Stephenson and Company	1865	
177	Osborne	0-6-0		Robert Stephenson and Company	1865	
178	Balmoral	0-6-0		Robert Stephenson and Company	1865	
179	Edinburgh	0-6-0		Robert Stephenson and Company	1865	
180	Dublin	0-6-0		Robert Stephenson and Company	1865	
181	Malton	0-6-0		Robert Stephenson and Company	1865	
182	Elton	0-6-0		Robert Stephenson and Company	1865	
183	Acklam	0-6-0		Robert Stephenson and Company	1866	
184	Lark	0-6-0		Robert Stephenson and Company	1866	
185	Swallow	0-6-0		Robert Stephenson and Company	1866	
186	Union	0-6-0		Darlington railway works	1865	
187	Iron Age	0-6-0		Gilkes Wilson and Company	1864	
188	Lily	0-6-0		Gilkes Wilson and Company	1865	
189	Spring	0-6-0		Darlington railway works	1864	
190	Summer	0-6-0		Darlington railway works	1865	
191	Autumn	0-6-0		Darlington railway works	1866	
192	Winter	0-6-0		Darlington railway works	1866	
193	Princess	0-6-0		Darlington railway works	1866	
194	Alice	0-6-0		Shildon railway works	1866	
195	Helena	0-6-0		Shildon railway works	1866	
196	Roseberry	0-6-0ST		Robert Stephenson and Company	1866	Rebuilt as 0-6-0 in 1882.
197	Kildare	0-6-0ST		Robert Stephenson and Company	1866	Rebuilt as 0-6-0 in 1890.
198	Whitby	0-6-0ST		Robert Stephenson and Company	1866	Rebuilt as 0-6-0 in 1888.
199	Escomb	0-6-0ST		Robert Stephenson and Company	1866	Rebuilt as 0-6-0 in 1884.
200	?	0-6-0		Hopkins, Gilkes & Co.	1867	
201	Carlton	0-6-0		Hopkins, Gilkes & Co.	1867	
202	Ireland	0-6-0		Darlington railway works	1867	
203	England	0-6-0		Darlington railway works	1867	
204	—	0-6-0		Hopkins, Gilkes & Co.	1867	
205	—	0-6-0		Hopkins, Gilkes & Co.	1867	
206	—	0-6-0		Hopkins, Gilkes & Co.	1868	
207	—	0-6-0		R and W Hawthorn	1867	
208	—	0-6-0		R and W Hawthorn	1868	
209	—	0-6-0		R and W Hawthorn	1868	
210	—	0-6-0		R and W Hawthorn	1868	
211	—	0-6-0		R and W Hawthorn	1868	
212	—	0-6-0		R and W Hawthorn	1868	
213	—	0-6-0		R and W Hawthorn	1868	
214	—	0-6-0		R and W Hawthorn	1868	
215	—	0-6-0		R and W Hawthorn	1868	
216	—	0-6-0		R and W Hawthorn	1868	
217	—	0-6-0		R and W Hawthorn	1868	
218	—	0-6-0		R and W Hawthorn	1868	
219	—	0-6-0		Darlington railway works	1869	
220	—	0-6-0		Darlington railway works	1869	
238	—	4-4-0		Darlington railway works	1871	
239	—	4-4-0		Darlington railway works	1872	
240	—	4-4-0		Darlington railway works	1872	
241	—	4-4-0		Darlington railway works	1872	

== Disposal ==
When the North Eastern Railway (NER) took over the Stockton and Darlington Railway (SDR) in 1863, the SDR stock included 157 locomotives. The SDR locomotives were administered by a separate committee until 1873. The SDR locomotives were renumbered in 1873, mostly by the addition of 1000. In September 1875 there were still 55 SDR locomotives in existence.

== See also ==
- Darlington Works
- Locomotives of the North Eastern Railway
