= William Bouch =

- Born: September 1813; Thursby, Cumbria, England
- Died: 19 January 1876 (aged 62); Weymouth, Dorset, England

William Bouch (/ˈbaʊtʃ/; 1813–1876) was an English railway engineer, who is famous for the steam locomotives he designed for the Stockton and Darlington Railway.

== Career ==
William Bouch was an elder brother of Thomas Bouch. He was apprenticed to Robert Stephenson and Company and later served in the Russian Navy. He became Locomotive Engineer of the Stockton and Darlington Railway in May 1840. In this role he was one of the two managers of the newly established Shildon Works Company, along with Oswald Gilkes. The company maintained the locomotives and rolling stock of the Stockton and Darlington Railway under contract; they also built rolling stock for the Manchester and Leeds Railway and the Great North of England Railway.

In 1849 the Shildon Works Company under Bouch and Gilkes took over the entire haulage of passenger and freight trains on the Stockton & Darlington Railway. Gilkes died in 1855 and his place was taken by David Dale.

In 1860, Bouch designed the first British standard gauge tender locomotives to use a 4-4-0 wheel layout which had earlier become popular in the United States. These were intended for use on the South Durham and Lancashire Union Railway over the Stainmore pass, then under construction. In 1858, prior to the design being finalised, Bouch consulted Gooch and Brunel about the broad gauge 4-4-0 saddle tank locomotives in use on the South Devon Railway, and also discussing the standard gauge 4-4-0 tank locomotives on the North London Railway with their Locomotive Engineer William Adams. He also worked closely with William Weallens, a partner in Robert Stephenson & Co, who loaned a 4-4-0 tender locomotive to the S&DR for trials - this had been built by Stephensons for the Ottoman Railway Company.

Bouch was also responsible for the overall design of the new North Road Locomotive Works at Darlington, opened in 1863 and also part of the Shildon Works Company. These workshops took over the building and repair of the Stockton & Darlington Railway's steam locomotive fleet. Shildon Works began to concentrate on wagon building and repair.

Bouch was also a prominent member of various iron-producing firms. He was a director of Hopkins, Gilkes, and Co., Ltd; of Gilkes, Wilson, Pease, and Co.; of the Darlington Forge Company, Ltd; of the Bearpark Coal and Coke Company; of the Eden Valley Mining Company; and of Cowans, Sheldon, and Co., Carlisle.

Bouch was unable to take part in the Railway Jubilee celebrations in Darlington in 1875 owing to ill-health. A letter of apology to Henry Pease, one of the organisers of the celebrations, is in the collection of the National Railway Museum. In it, Bouch explained his philosophy for stocking spare parts and noted that locomotives could be repaired and back in service within seven days.

== Saltburn class locomotives ==
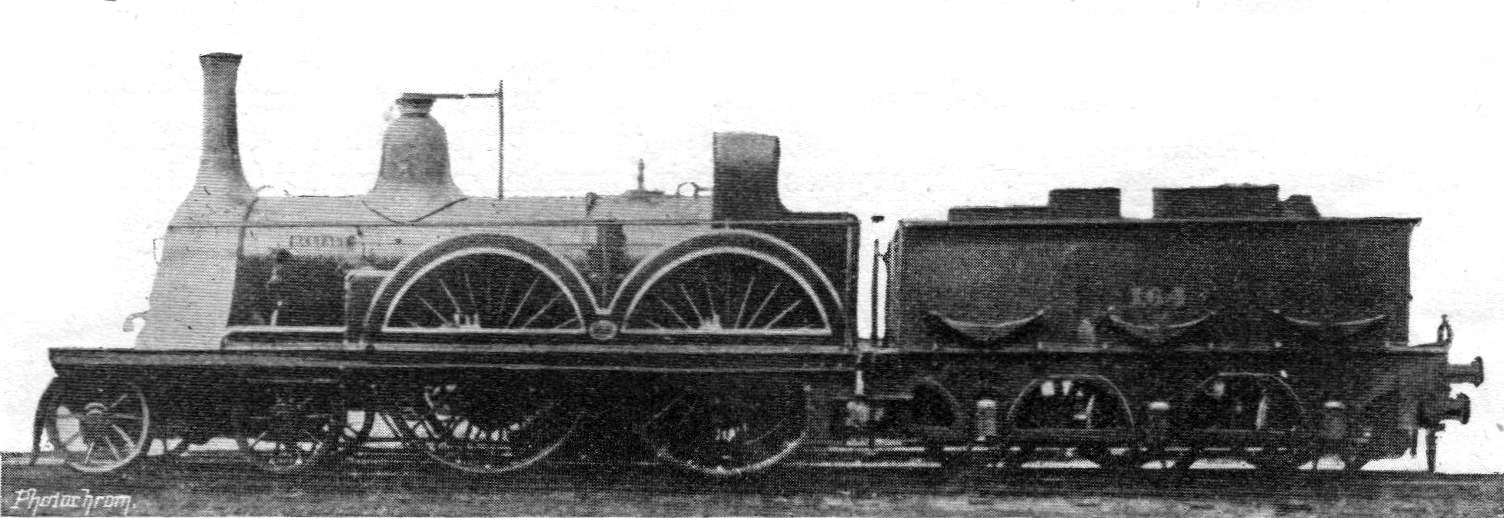
NER locomotive 164 Belfast

These 4-4-0 locomotives were designed by William Bouch for the Stockton and Darlington Railway. They were built by Robert Stephenson and introduced in 1862. Leading dimensions were: Driving wheels, 7 ft 0½in; grate area, 12¾ square feet; total heating surface, 1053 square feet; weight, 46 tons. They passed to the North Eastern Railway in 1863.

SDR number	Name	Works number	Date withdrawn by NER
162	Saltburn	1332	1879
163	Morecambe	1333	1888
164	Belfast	1334	1882
165	Keswick	1335	1886

== Family ==
William was a brother of Sir Thomas Bouch. He married Jane Bouch (perhaps a cousin) in 1842; there were no children. In failing health since early 1875, he travelled to the south coast resort of Weymouth in an attempt to recover. He is buried in the cemetery at Melcombe Regis, Dorset.

== Preserved locomotive ==
One of Bouch's locomotives survives - NER '1001' Class No. 1275.

== See also ==
- Locomotives of the Stockton and Darlington Railway
