= Hopetown Darlington =

English railway-themed visitor attraction

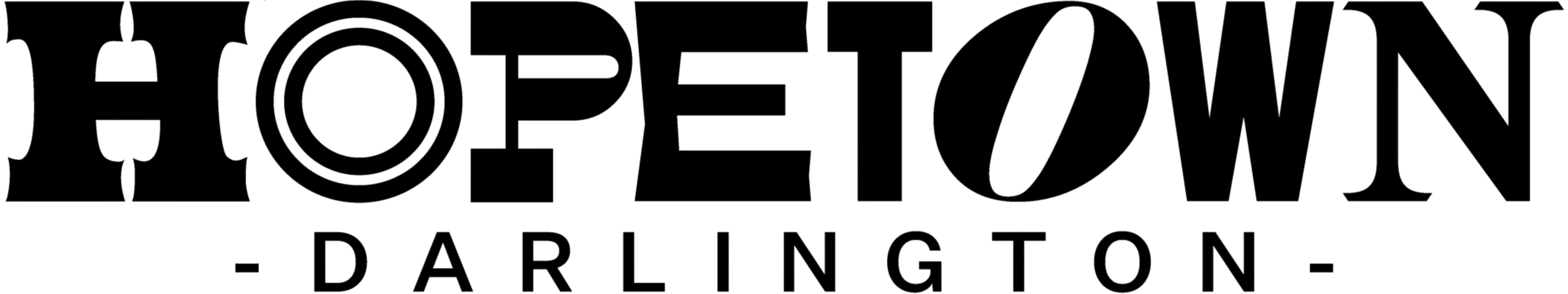

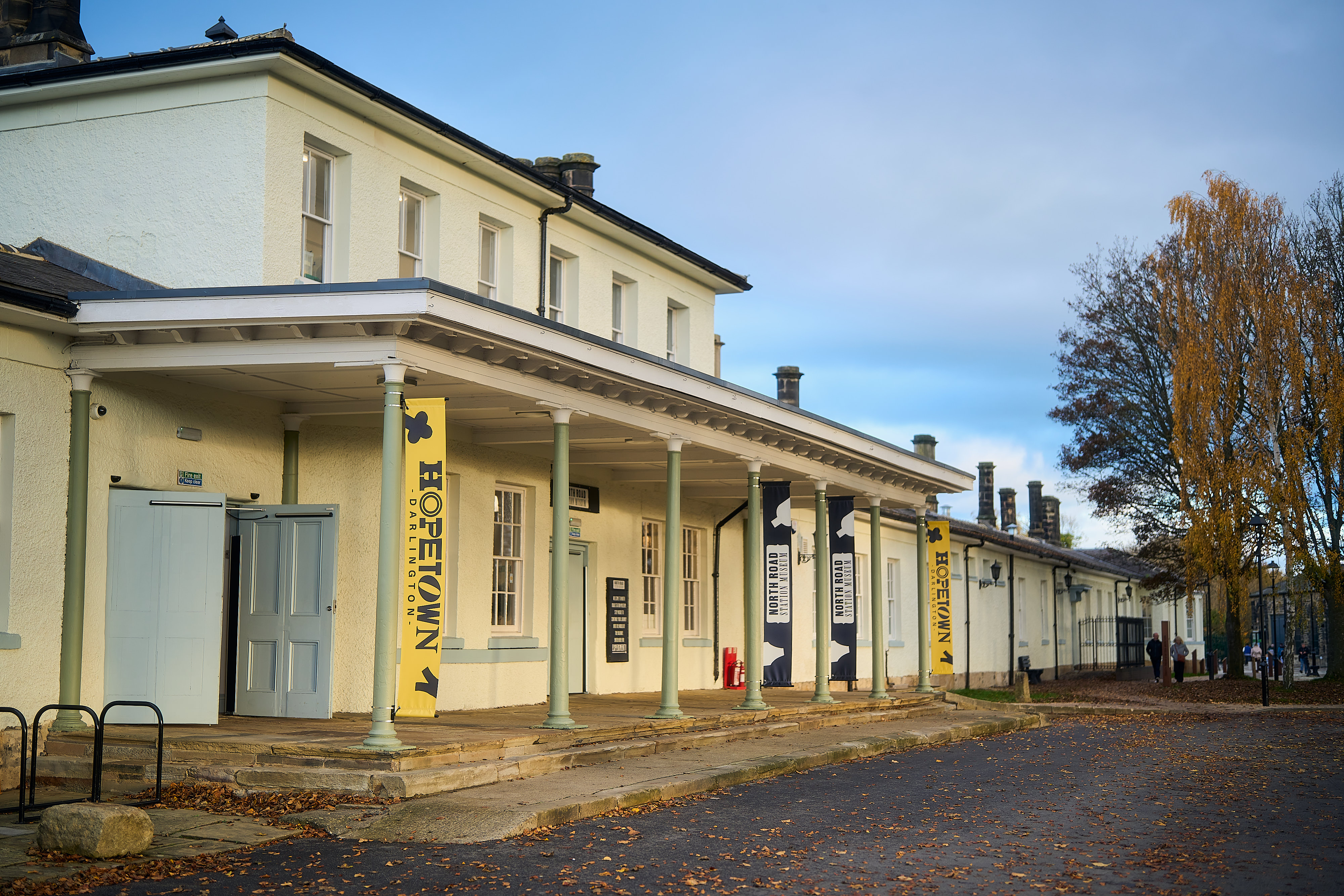
- Former names: Head of Steam Railway Museum (2008-2022), Darlington Railway Centre and Museum (1975-2007)
- Established: 16th July 2024
- Location: McNay Street, Darlington, County Durham, DL3 6SW
- Type: Visitor Attraction
- Visitors: 210,000 (July 2024-July 2025)
- Owner: Darlington Borough Council
- Parking: Skerne Bridge Car Park
- Website: www.hopetowndarlington.co.uk

Hopetown Darlington is a railway-themed visitor attraction in Darlington that opened in July 2024.

The attraction explores and promotes Darlington's pioneering railway heritage, and at the same time serves as a community hub hosting large scale events, activities and festivals.

It is located on the 1825 route of the Stockton and Darlington Railway, which was the world's first steam-powered passenger railway and shares a site with North Road railway station.

== History ==
The origins of the attraction begin in 1975 when the rarely used and heavily vandalised North Road Railway Station was transformed into the original North Road Station Museum to celebrate the 150th anniversary of the Stockton & Darlington Railway. The original station was opened on 27 September 1975 by Prince Philip, Duke of Edinburgh.

After 32 years of operation, the museum was closed in 2007 for the £1.7 million refurbishment into the Head of Steam Darlington Railway Museum.

The museum was previously known as Head of Steam Darlington Railway Museum (2008-2022) and Darlington Railway Centre and Museum (1975-2007).

In 2022, plans were submitted to expand the former Head of Steam Railway museum as part of a new Railway Heritage Quarter to celebrate the bicentenary of the Stockton & Darlington Railway in 2025. In December 2022, the museum temporarily closed to undergo a £37 million redevelopment into a new visitor attraction.

In October 2023, the official name of the Rail Heritage Quarter was revealed as Hopetown Darlington, after the area of Darlington in which it is situated, which is so named due to the location of the historic Hopetown Carriage Works and Hope Town Foundry. Hopetown Darlington opened to the public in July 2024.

In September 2025 a replica Locomotion No. 1 recreating the original Stockton and Darlington Railway run for the 200th anniversary ended its first day of the journey 3 day run at the museum at having previously stopped at Darlington station

== Buildings ==
The attraction is spread across 7.5 acres of heritage railway land and is a mix of both indoor and outdoor attractions. The main features of the attraction include:

- North Road Station Museum (based inside the former North Road railway station building built in 1842. Its exhibits are devoted to origins of the Stockton and Darlington Railway and the North Eastern Railway with a particular focus on the Stockton & Darlington Railway and the railway industry of Darlington.
- Carriage Works - based in the former Hopetown Carriage Works building built in 1853. It is now home to a large exhibition hall and also to 'The Stores' where over 30,000 of Darlington's historic collection is on display.
- Goods Shed - based in the former S&DR Goods Shed building built in 1833. This is the main entrance to the site and also the location of the attraction's shop, café and immersive experiences.
- Darlington Locomotive Works - a new locomotive building facility constructed between 2022-2024. The building is home to the A1 Steam Locomotive Trust who are currently constructing the P2 Class No.2007 Prince of Wales locomotive.
- 1861 Shed - a redeveloped railway shed now home to Darlington Railway Preservation Society and North Eastern Locomotive Preservation Group.
- Skerne Bridge - the oldest railway bridge in the world still in continuous use by train and locomotives to this day. Built in 1825.
- Wagon Woods - an outdoor children's play park based on the Brusselton Incline.
- Experiment! - an immersive experience ride inside the railway museum exploring Darlington's influence of communities and cultures around the world.

== Locomotives ==
Hopetown Darlington displays the following locomotives across the site:

Number & Name	Year	Description	Livery	History	Image	Location
Replica Locomotion No.1	1975	Replica S&DR 0-4-0	N/A	The replica Locomotion No. 1 was built in 1975 to celebrate the 150th anniversary of the Stockton and Darlington Railway. Previously based at Beamish Museum, the replica was restored to working order in time for the 200th anniversary in 2025.		1861 Shed
No. 25 Derwent	1845	S&DR 0-6-0	Green	No. 25 Derwent was designed by Timothy Hackworth and built by William and Alfred Kitching for use on the Stockton and Darlington Railway. It spent many years on display at Darlington Bank Top station before being put on display in North Road Station Museum.		North Road Station Museum
No. 1463	1885	NER 1463 (LNER E5) 2-4-0	NER Apple Green	Designed by Henry Tennant and Thomas W. Worsdell for use on express trains. It spent a large portion of its preserved career on display at the National Railway Museum.		North Road Station Museum
No. D6898	1964	BR Class 37 Co-Co	BR Green	No. D6898 (TOPS 37198) was designed by English Electric and built at their Robert Stephenson and Hawthorns works in Darlington. It was the final locomotive built at the works before its closure. It was withdrawn from service in 1999 and preserved before being resold to Network Rail in 2008. After being used as a spares donor for other class members, it was donated to the museum in August 2021.		Foundry Green
