= Locomotion No. 1 =

Early steam locomotive (built 1825)

Coordinates: 54.536°N 1.555°W

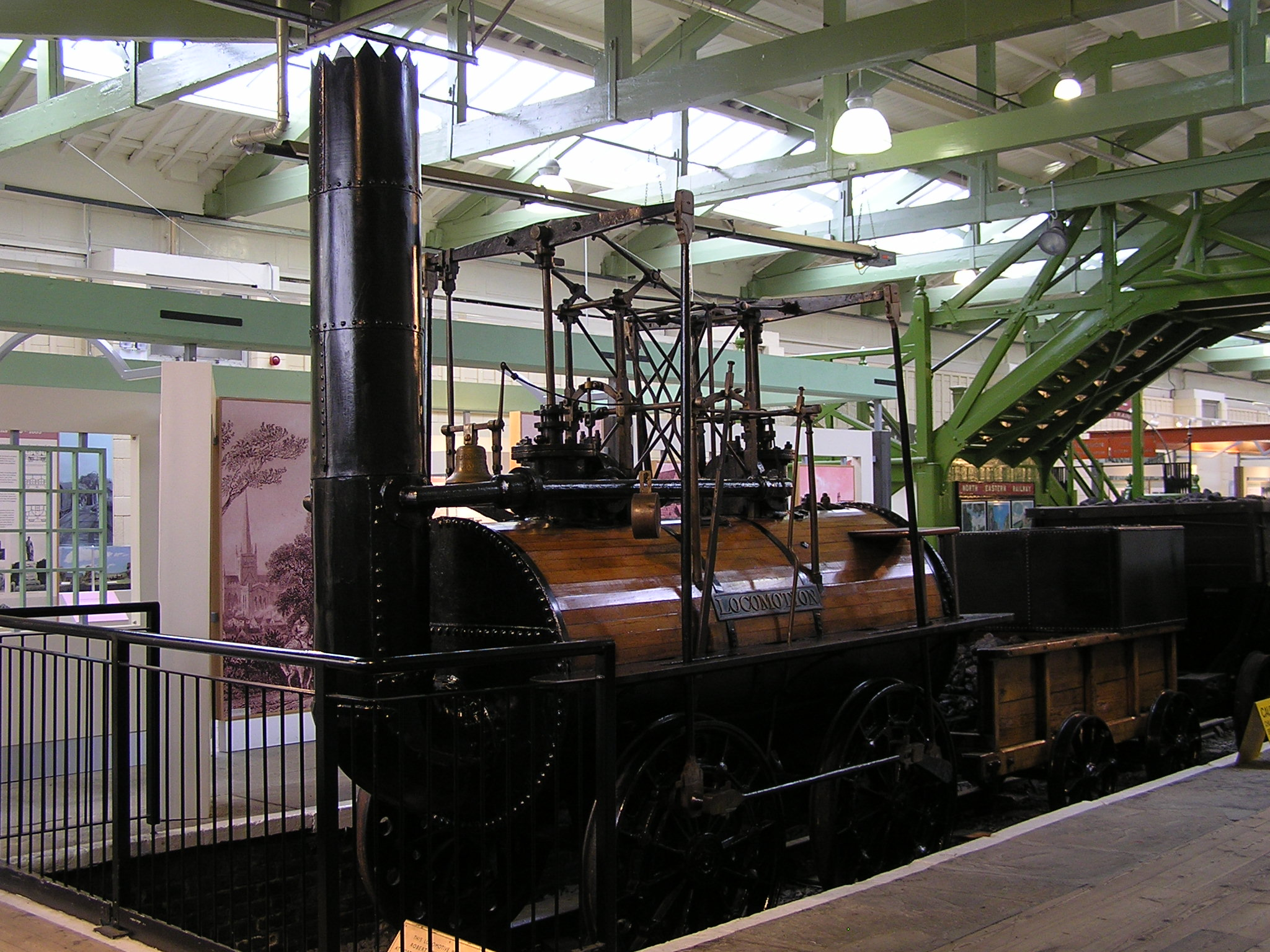
- Locomotion at Darlington Railway Centre and Museum
Type and origin
- Power type: Steam
- Builder: Robert Stephenson and Company
- Build date: 1825
Specifications
- Configuration
  - Whyte: 0-4-0
- Driver dia.: 48 in (1.219 m)
- Loco weight: 6.5 long tons (7.3 short tons; 6.6 t)
- Fuel type: Coke
- Fuel capacity: 1 t (1.0 long ton; 1.1 short tons)
- Water cap.: 240 imp gal or 290 US gal or 1,100 L
- Boiler pressure: 50 psi (0.34 MPa)
- Heating surface: 60 sq ft (5.57 m^{2})
- Cylinders: Two, inside
- Cylinder size: 9 in × 24 in (229 mm × 610 mm)
Performance figures
- Maximum speed: 15 mph (24 km/h)
- Tractive effort: 1,900 lbf (8.5 kN)
Career
- Operators: Stockton and Darlington
- First run: 27 September 1825
- Retired: 1857
- Disposition: On static display as part of the “Railway Pioneers” exhibition at Hopetown Darlington

Locomotion No. 1 (originally named Active) is an early steam locomotive that was built in 1825 by the pioneering railway engineers George and Robert Stephenson at their manufacturing firm, Robert Stephenson and Company. It became the first steam locomotive to haul a passenger-carrying train on a public railway, the Stockton and Darlington Railway (S&DR).

Locomotion was ordered by the Stockton and Darlington Railway Company in September 1824; its design benefitted from George Stephenson's experience building his series of Killingworth locomotives. It is believed that Locomotion No. 1 was the first locomotive to make use of coupling rods to link together its driving wheels, reducing the chance of the wheels slipping on the iron rails. However, the centre-flue boiler proved to be a weakness, providing a poorer heating surface than later multi-flue boilers.

In September 1825, Locomotion hauled the first train on the Stockton and Darlington Railway, the first locomotive to haul a passenger train on a public railway. On 1 July 1828, it was heavily damaged when its boiler exploded at Aycliffe Lane station, killing its driver, John Cree. It was rebuilt, but as a consequence of the rapid advances in locomotive design, Locomotion became obsolete within a decade. It was used on the railway until 1850, after which it was converted into a stationary engine. In 1857, as a consequence of its historical importance, Locomotion was preserved and put on display. Between 1892 and 1975, it was on static display at one of the platforms at Darlington Bank Top railway station, and was then on display at the Head of Steam museum based at Darlington North Road railway station between 1975 and 2021. It was then moved to the Locomotion Museum in Shildon. A working replica of Locomotion was built, and following years of operation at Beamish Museum was put on display at the Head of Steam museum.

== History ==
=== Origins ===
On 23 June 1823, the pioneering locomotive manufacturer Robert Stephenson and Company was established by the railway engineers George Stephenson and his son Robert Stephenson, and the businessmen Edward Pease and Thomas Richardson. In November of that year, only months after the company started operations, a key order was placed by the Stockton & Darlington Railway Company for four stationary engines.

On 16 September 1824, the S&DR ordered a pair of steam locomotives, at a price of £550 (about £47,460 today) each. This order was historically important as the first of these locomotives, Active (later renamed Locomotion No. 1), was the first steam locomotive to haul a passenger train on a public railway.

=== Design ===
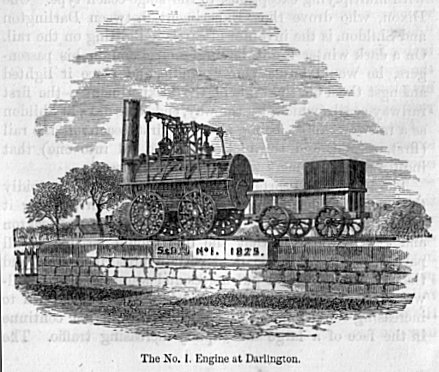
The No. 1 engine, called Locomotion, for the Stockton and Darlington Railway

The design of Locomotion No. 1 combined and built on the improvements that George Stephenson had incorporated in his Killingworth locomotives. Construction was supervised by Timothy Hackworth and James Kennedy. The locomotive weighed 6.5 long tons (7.3 short tons; 6.6 t), with many elements, including the boiler, cylinders, and wheels, made of cast iron on a timber frame.

Locomotion used high-pressure (50 psi (340 kPa)) steam generated in a centre-flue boiler and driving a pair of vertical cylinders, 9 inches (230 mm) in diameter, which were half embedded within the boiler. The single-flue boiler had a lower heating surface-to-water ratio than later boiler designs. It had four 4-foot (1.2 m) diameter driving wheels and a maximum speed of about 15 mph (24 km/h). A pair of cross-heads above the cylinders transmitted the power through a pair of connecting rods, making use of a loose eccentric valve gear. Locomotion No. 1 is believed to have been the first locomotive to use coupling rods to connect its driving wheels together, an approach that considerably decreased the chance of slipping.

Author H. C. Casserley considers that Locomotion No. 1 is most notable for being the first locomotive to haul a passenger train on a public railway, rather than for the innovations in its design.

=== Operations ===
The completed Locomotion No. 1 was transported by road from Newcastle to Darlington in September 1825. On 26 September, the day before the opening of the Stockton and Darlington Railway, the locomotive was taken on a trial run between Shildon and Darlington, with a number of the railway's directors aboard the railway's first passenger coach, known as "Experiment". The driver, who had to perch on a small platform beside the boiler, was James Stephenson, the elder brother of George Stephenson; the fireman, William Gowling, stood on a footplate between the engine and the tender.

On 27 September 1825, Locomotion No. 1 hauled the first train on the Stockton and Darlington Railway, driven by George Stephenson. The train consisted of Locomotion, eleven wagons of coal, the carriage "Experiment", and a further 20 wagons of passengers, guests, and workmen. Around 300 tickets had been sold, but about twice as many people were believed to have been aboard. The train, which had an estimated weight of 80 metric tons (79 long tons; 88 short tons) and was 400 feet (121.9 metres) long, reached a maximum speed of 12 mph (19 km/h), and took two hours to complete the first 8.7 miles (14.0 km) of the journey to Darlington, slowed by a derailed wagon and a blocked feed pump valve for an average speed of 8 mph (13 km/h).

Locomotion No. 1 continued to haul trains on the S&DR for three years. On 1 July 1828, the locomotive was heavily damaged when the boiler exploded while the train was stopped at Aycliffe Lane station, killing driver John Cree, and wounding water pumper Edward Turnbull. Cree had tied down the arm of a safety valve, which caused the boiler pressure to rise to the point of explosion.

Locomotion No. 1 was rebuilt and returned to service and ran until 1850. The engine changed over time; Hackworth changed the wheels from spoked to two piece centre and rims and a Freemantle (parallel) motion replaced the Stephenson's slidebars. On 4 June 1846, it hauled the opening train on the Middlesbrough and Redcar Railway, a subsidiary of the S&DR.

Following its withdrawal, Locomotion was purchased by Joseph Pease and Partners and converted into a stationary pumping engine for use at their West Collieries in South Durham, where it was used until 1857.

=== Heraldry ===
Darlington Football Club badge

Coat of arms of Darlington Borough Council

Locomotion No. 1, due to its significant history, is depicted on the town's coat of arms and on the badge of its football team.

== Preservation ==
In 1856, Joseph Pease and his family spent £50 to restore the S&DR Company's Locomotion No. 1, saving it from the scrapyard when its working life had ended; it was one of the first locomotives to be restored for preservation.

Between 1857 and the 1880s, it was usually on the pedestal display at Alfred Kitching's workshop near the Hopetown Carriage Works. It was on exhibition in Philadelphia in 1876, Newcastle in 1881 and 1887, Chicago in 1883, Liverpool in 1886, Paris in 1889, and Edinburgh in 1890. Locomotion No. 1 was steamed for the Stockton and Darlington Railway's Golden Jubilee in September 1875, and to participate in a procession of locomotives at the George Stephenson Centenary in June 1881. Locomotion always returned to its static display in Darlington, the headquarters of the Stockton and Darlington Railway Company.

From 1892 to 1975, Locomotion was on static display along with Derwent, another early locomotive, on one of the platforms overlooking the S&DR line to Saltburn-by-the-Sea at Darlington's main station Bank Top. In 1924, it was cosmetically restored. During the Second World War, it was temporarily relocated (at Stanhope) due to the threat of bombing. In 1975 Darlington built its railway museum around Locomotion No. 1.

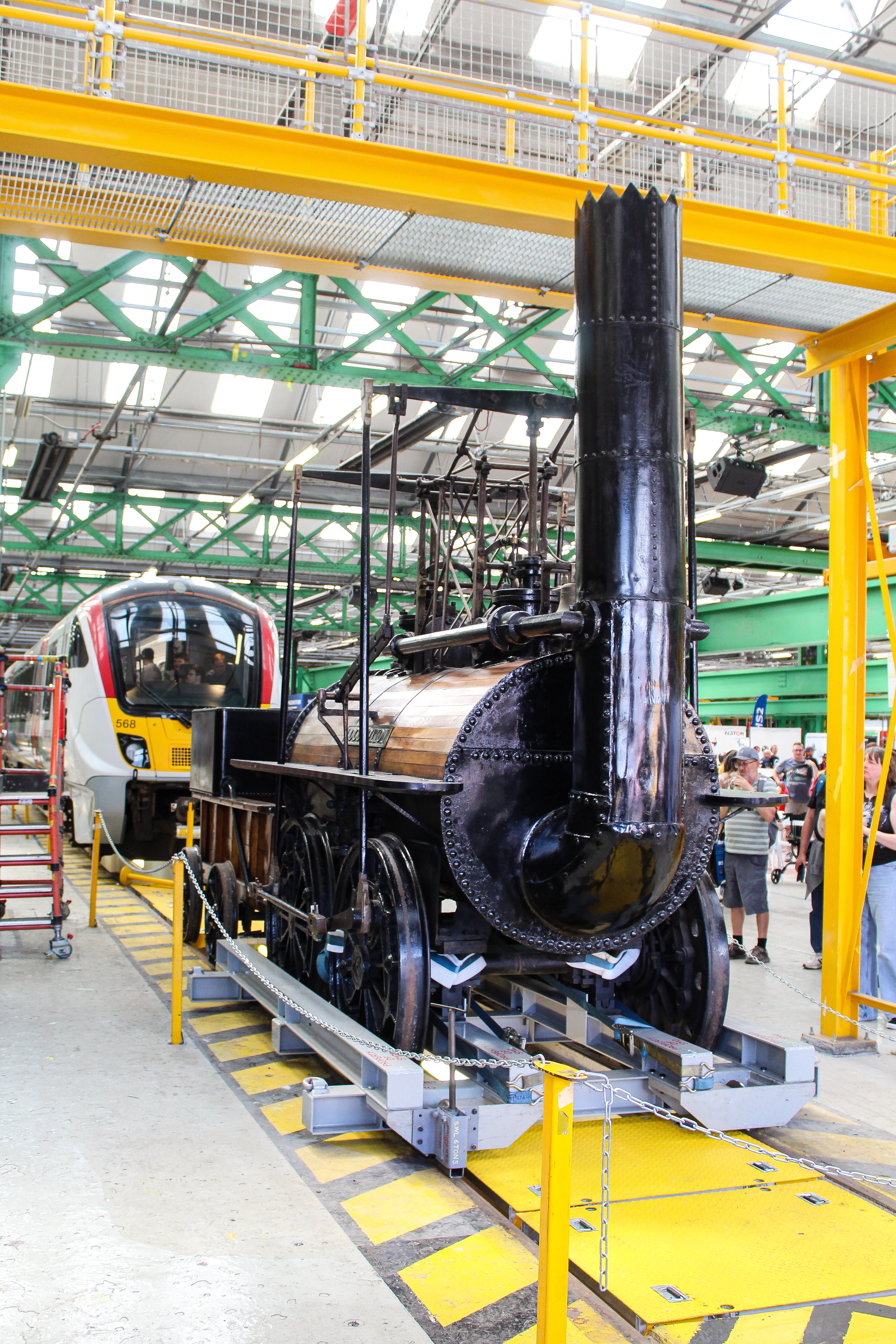
Locomotion No. 1 at the Greatest Gathering, Derby, 2025

As ownership of the railways changed, the locomotive became a British Rail historic item, all of which were transferred as the National Collection in 1968 to the National Railway Museum (NRM), now part of the Science Museum Group (SMG). The locomotive, as its ownership changed, remained in Darlington from 1857, in later years on display at the Head of Steam museum in Darlington, in the same building as Darlington's North Road station.

From 1975, it was formally on loan by the NRM to Head of Steam. The loan agreement expired in March 2021, after which the locomotive was moved to the NRM's outpost museum in Shildon, named Locomotion. Some in Darlington objected to the move, as the locomotive had resided in Darlington since preservation, and is depicted on the town's coat of arms and on the badges of its football and rugby clubs; it is claimed by some that the locomotive is only owned by the NRM due to an accident of history. An agreement was reached between Darlington Borough Council and the Science Museum Group which will see Locomotion return to Darlington for extended visits in the lead-up to the 200th anniversary of the Stockton and Darlington Railway in 2025. During 1–3 August 2025, the static Locomotion No. 1 was on display for the Greatest Gathering held at Derby Litchurch Lane Works.

=== 1975 replica ===
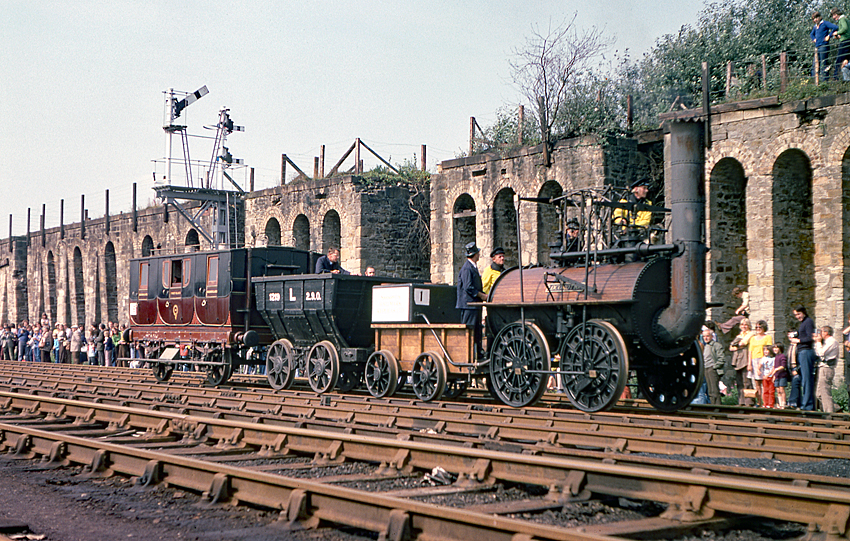
The replica in 1975

As the original locomotive is too fragile to return to steam, a working replica was built in 1975 to celebrate the 150th anniversary of the S&DR and was then resident at Beamish Museum. After a period on display at the Locomotion museum, it moved to Head of Steam in April 2021, replacing the original.

Originally only at Darlington on loan from Beamish, ownership of the working replica was transferred to Darlington Borough Council.

==== S&DR200 / Railway200 (2025) ====
Restoration was undertaken primarily at Locomotive Maintenance Services, Loughborough approximately 18 months in advance with help from Guy Martin, just in time for the S&DR 200 Celebrations in September 2025. Test runs were carried out on heritage railways such as the Great Central Railway, Ruddington, the Weardale Railway in June and at the Locomotion Museum.

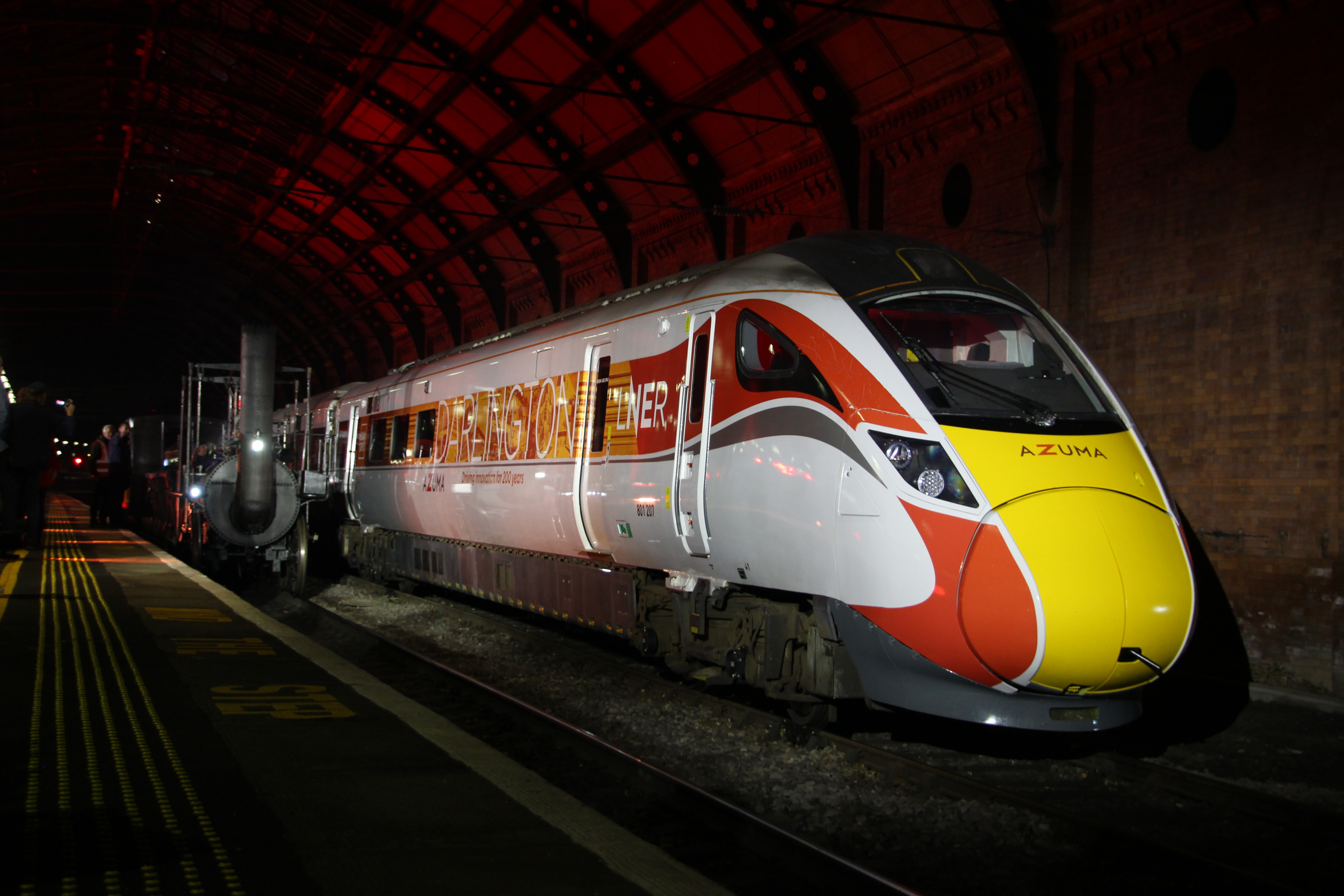
Locomotion No. 1 and LNER Azuma 'Darlington' at Darlington Station early on 28 September 2025

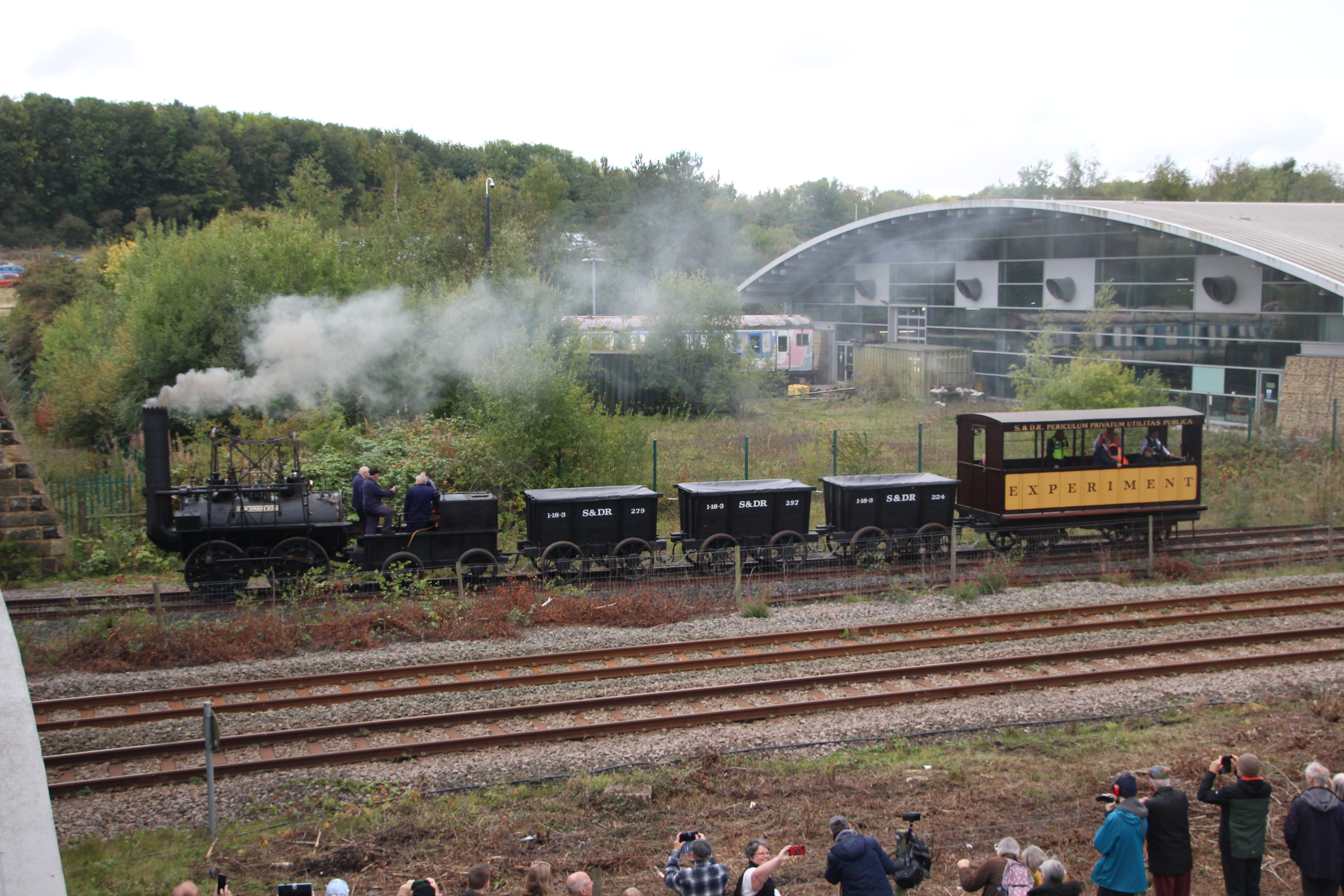
Locomotion No. 1 replica at Shildon for S&DR200 (26 September 2025)

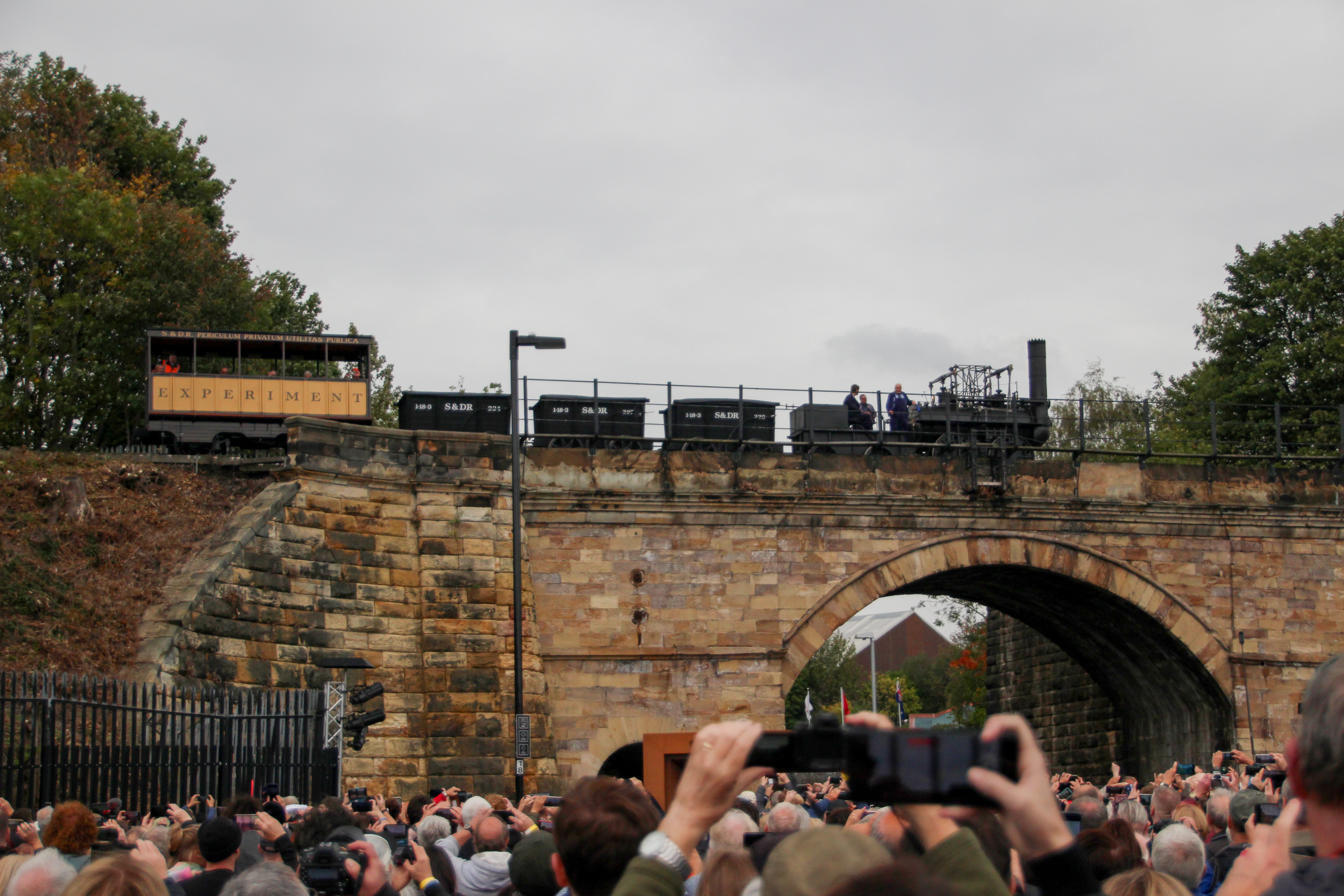
Locomotion No. 1 crossing Skerne Bridge (27 September 2025)

The engine left Locomotion at 12:05 on Friday 26 September and undertook a three-day journey to Stockton. The replica ended its first day of the journey at Hopetown Darlington. Around 10,000–15,000 spectators gathered along the route between Shildon and Hopetown.

On the second day it crossed the Skerne Bridge with crowds watching from the car park. It also stopped on top of the illuminated bridge in the early morning of 28 September, before arriving at Darlington station next to LNER Azuma 'Darlington'.

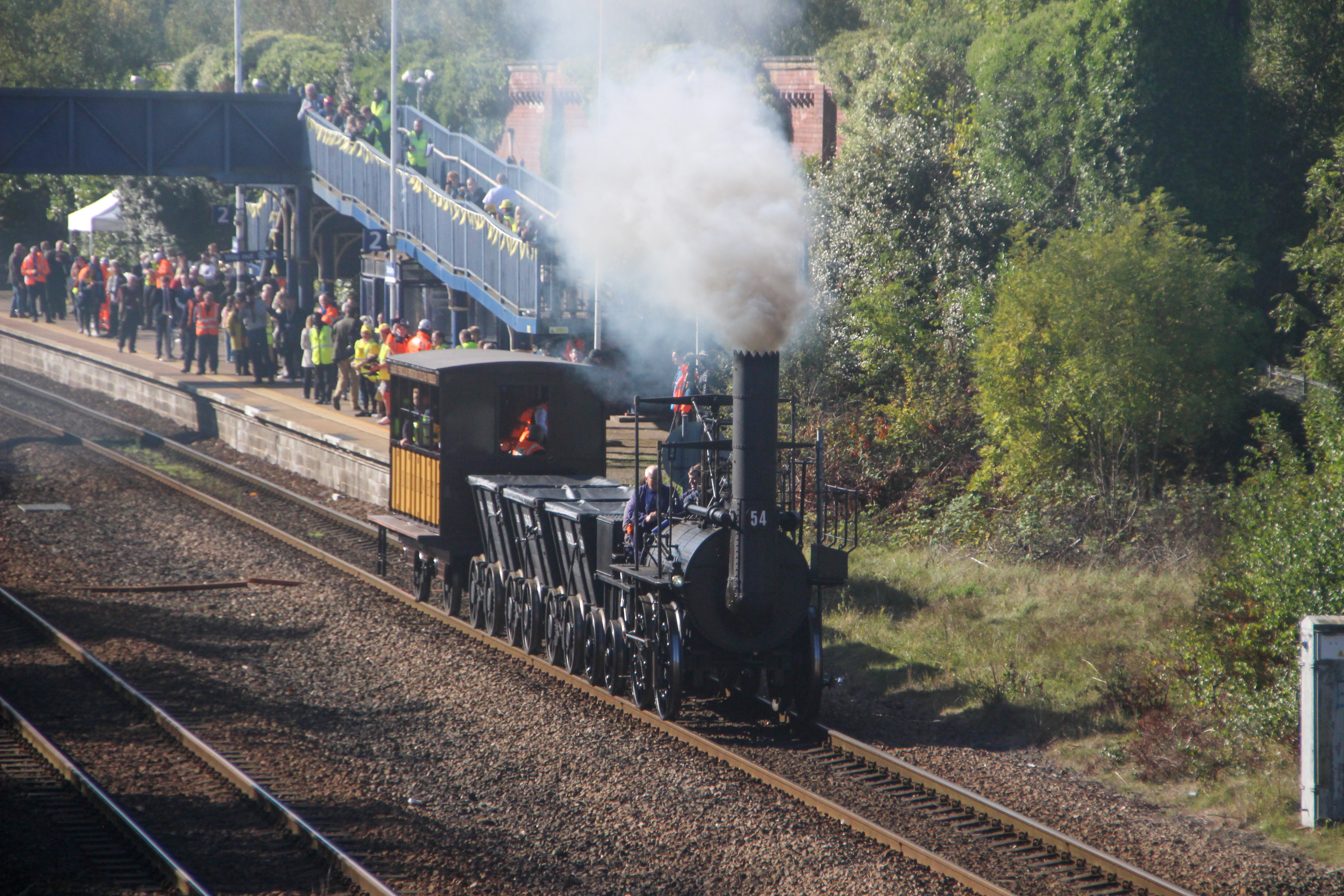
Locomotion No. 1 passing through Stockton Station (28 September 2025)

The locomotive then proceeded to Dinsdale Station ahead of the third day, which saw it making its way to Stockton Station and being welcomed by the sound of a brass band and dignitaries including the Mayor. Upon arrival at Rochester Road, the 4th Regiment Royal Artillery gave it a gun salute, as it did for the original locomotive, and was on display for 40 minutes before departing. Another 10,000 people are estimated to have attended this day too.

Following the conclusion of the celebrations, the locomotive made its way to Ferryhill where it was loaded onto a low loader and taken to Hitachi ahead of their open day on 4 October. The lines had to be closed for the runs since the train lacked the necessary equipment to interface with the network's signalling systems.

Each day was broadcast live to the S&DR200's YouTube channel in addition to being on live screens at Shildon, Darlington Market Square and Rochester Road. In total, more than 100,000 people are estimated to have visited the North East of England for celebrations over the three days, including Prince Edward, Duke of Edinburgh, who visited the replica Locomotion No. 1 at the start of its journey at Locomotion museum in Shildon, and travelled in a carriage pulled by the replica along the train rides track from the coal drops to the main museum building.

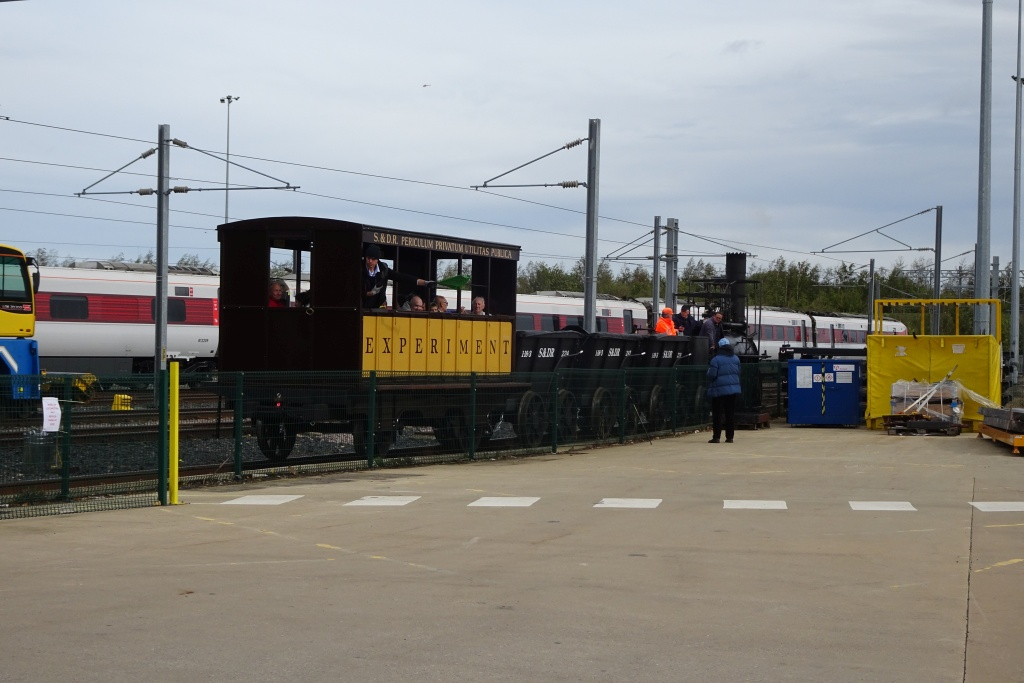
Locomotion No. 1 and an LNER Azuma at the Hitachi Open Day (4 October 2025)

On 4 October, the locomotive appeared at Hitachi Newton Aycliffe as part of their first ever open day for the general public. Locomotion No. 1 carried visitors up and down the test track which runs parallel to the Bishop Auckland branch line just after Heighington Station. The event sold out in under 72 hours and had over 1,500 visitors.

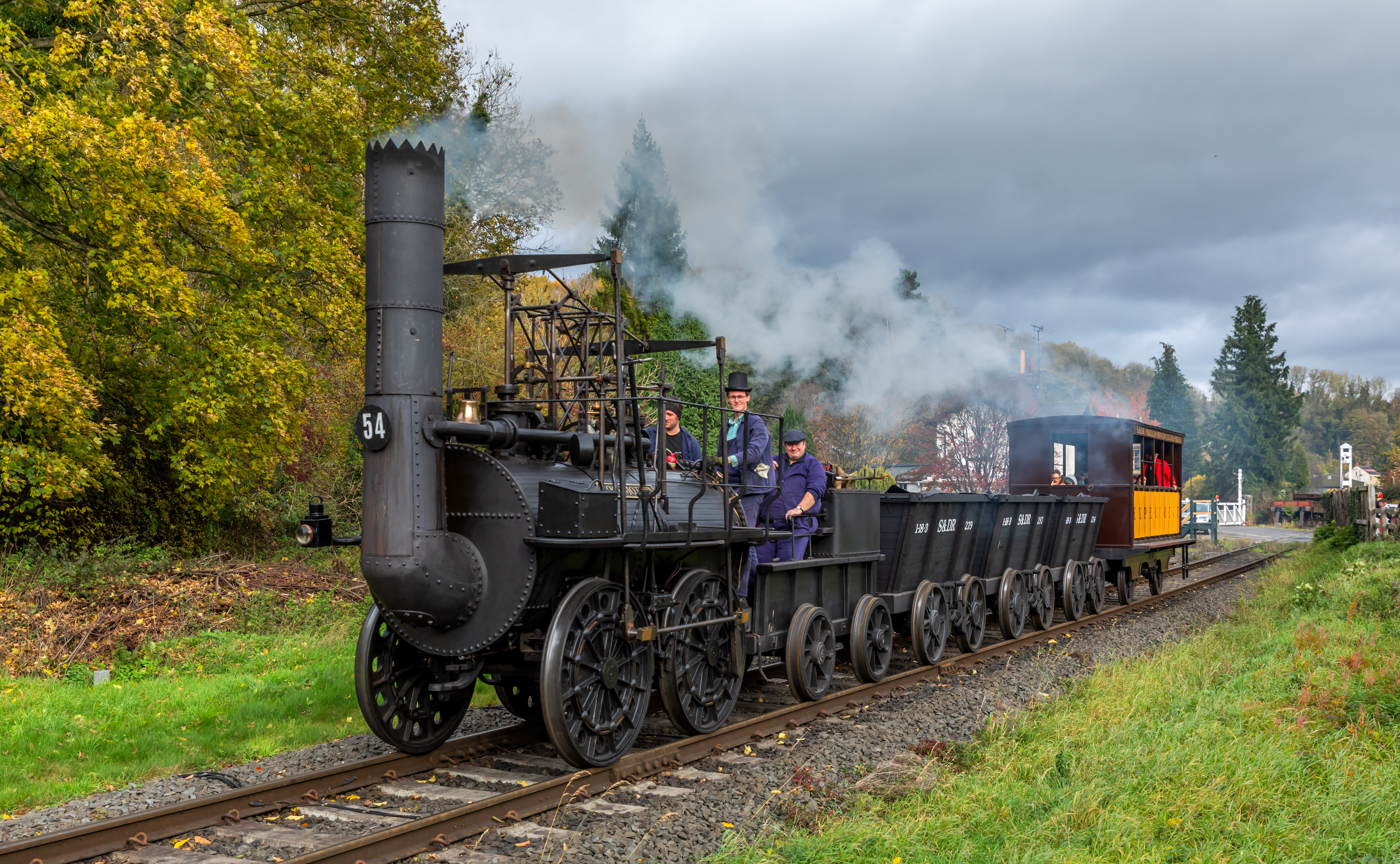
Locomotion No. 1 at New Bridge on the NYMR (1 November 2025)

Locomotion No. 1 also visited the North Yorkshire Moors Railway between 25 October and 9 November, where it was based at Pickering Station running 15-20 minute train rides up to New Bridge Crossing.

Locomotion No. 1 now resides at the carriage works inside Hopetown Darlington for the foreseeable future. As part of their Christmas celebrations, ‘Ho-Ho-Hopetown’, it became part of the elves’ workshop and was adorned with a wreath on the chimney in place of the ‘54’ plaque.

== See also ==
- Locomotive No. 1, the first locomotive in New South Wales
- Tom Thumb, the first American steam locomotive
- Stockton Flyer, a sculpture inspired by Locomotion No. 1
