= Stockton Flyer =

Kinetic sculpture

Coordinates: 54°33′55.1″N 1°18′46.6″W

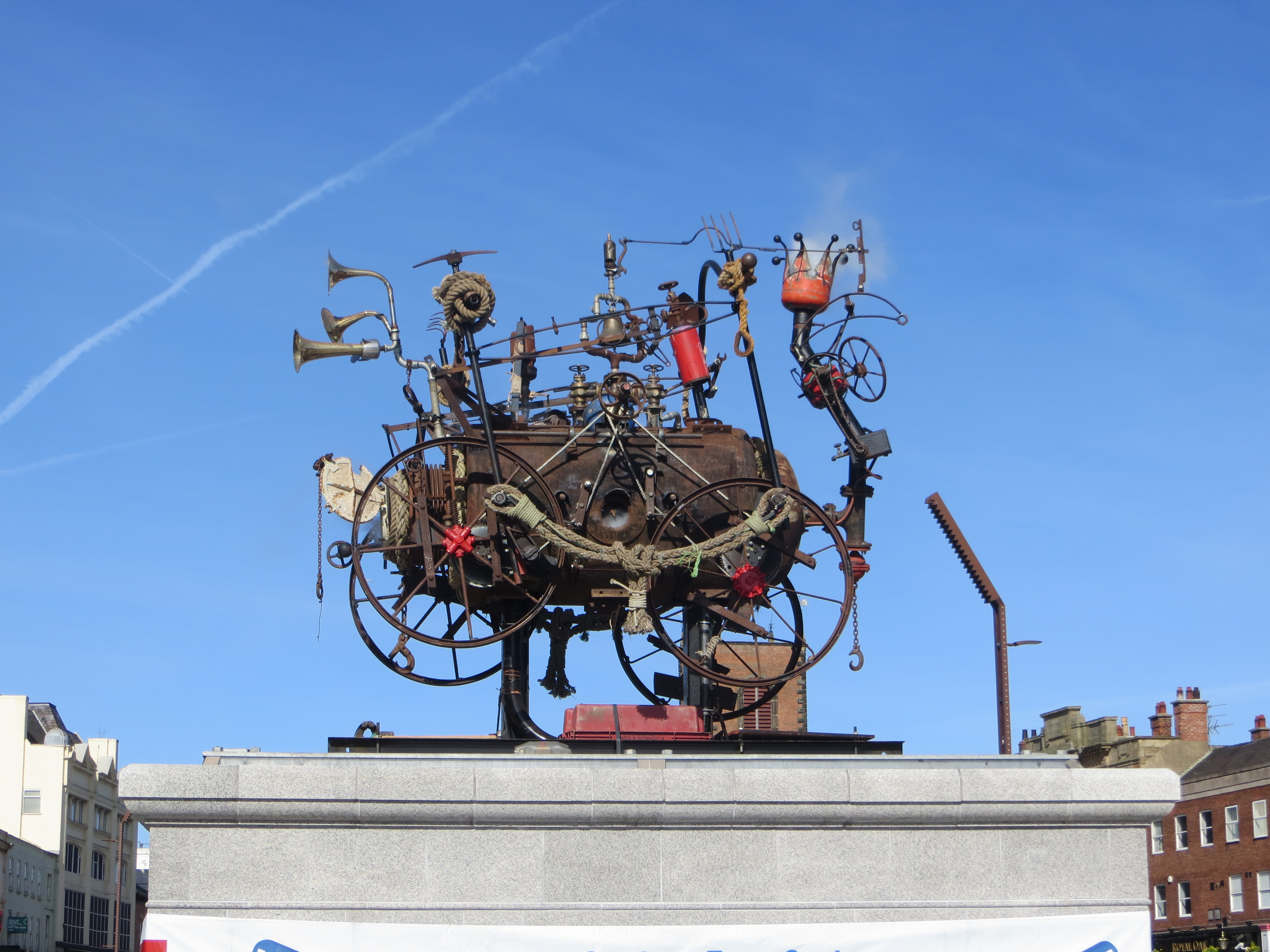
- Artist: Rob Higgs
- Medium: Kinetic sculpture
- Subject: Locomotion No. 1,
- Location: Stockton-on-Tees, County Durham, England

The Stockton Flyer is a kinetic sculpture in Stockton-on-Tees, County Durham, England. It is a stylised depiction of the Locomotion No. 1, which first arrived in Stockton in 1825, and, as part of the Stockton and Darlington Railway had a large impact on the town. The sculpture rises from within a stone plinth at 1 p.m. every day and moves, emits smokes, and sounds a whistle. It was designed and built by Rob Higgs and was unveiled on 12 June 2016.

== Description ==
The sculpture is normally hidden within a stone plinth near Stockton-on-Tees Town Hall. The sculpture is a stylised steam locomotive, inspired by George and Robert Stephenson's Locomotion No. 1. At 1:06 p.m. each day, (the delayed arrival time of the Locomotive), the sculpture emerges from the plinth, moves, blows its whistle and emits smoke. When fully emerged, the sculpture measures 7 metres (23 ft) in height, including the plinth.

== History ==
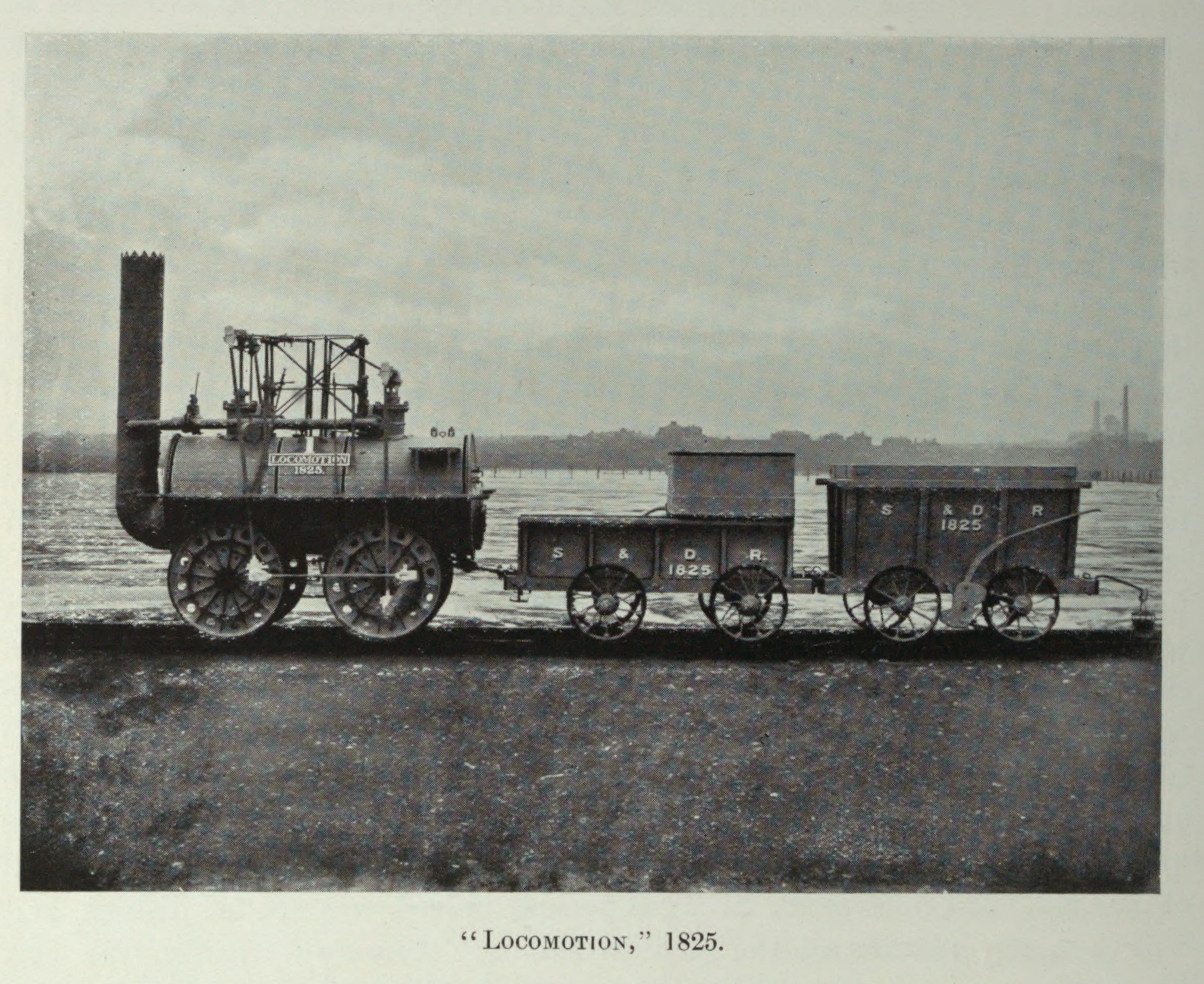
Locomotion No. 1

The railway was significant to the history of the Stockton; the first modern passenger railway line the Stockton and Darlington Railway was completed in 1825. Locomotion No. 1 first arrived at Stockton station on 27 September 1825. The railway was highly beneficial to the town's coal trade. In 1827 the railway was extended to the south bank of the River Tees where new staithes were built, this later grew into the city of Middlesbrough. In 2013 Stockton-on-Tees Borough Council decided to commission the Stockton Flyer to commemorate the towns's railway and industrial past. It followed the construction of a static sculpture of the Locomotion No. 1, a 27 metres (89 ft) steel model at St John’s Crossing at the southern end of the town unveiled in September 2013. The council justified the second sculpture, stating, "... whilst the St John's Crossing artwork is a literal representation of Locomotion No. 1 and its 1825 inaugural journey, The Stockton Flyer automata, intended for the High Street, represents our wider engineering achievements". Planning permission was granted in early September 2013.

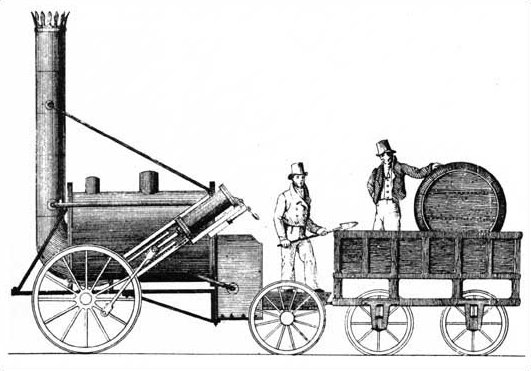
The Rocket

The Stockton Flyer was designed and built by Cornwall-based sculptor Rob Higgs. The initial design for the sculpture was criticised by some who considered it more closely resembled Stephenson's Rocket, which had no connection to the town and ran instead on the Liverpool and Manchester Railway. The Rocket had different propulsion and wheel arrangements to the Locomotion No. 1. A revised design more closely based on Locomotion No. 1 was revealed later in September 2013. By 2015 the stone plinth of the sculpture was already in place and was engraved with the poem The Infinite Town by Mark Robinson.

The Stockton Flyer was unveiled on 12 June 2016 as part of commemorations of Elizabeth II's 90th birthday (the Queen's Official Birthday). The council did not announce the cost of the sculpture, but it was part of the £38M regeneration of the High Street. The sculpture was turned off during the first COVID-19 national lockdown, but was reinstated on 4 July 2020.
