= Derwent (locomotive) =

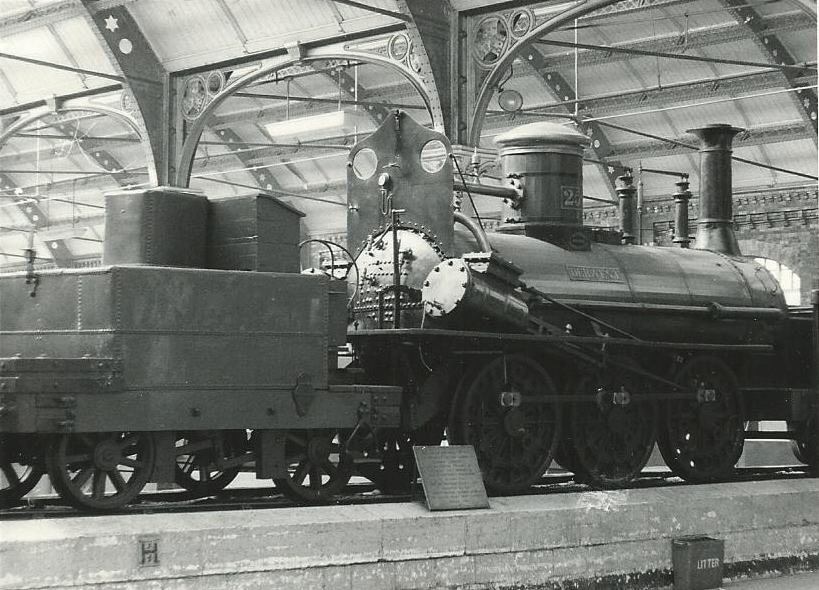
Derwent

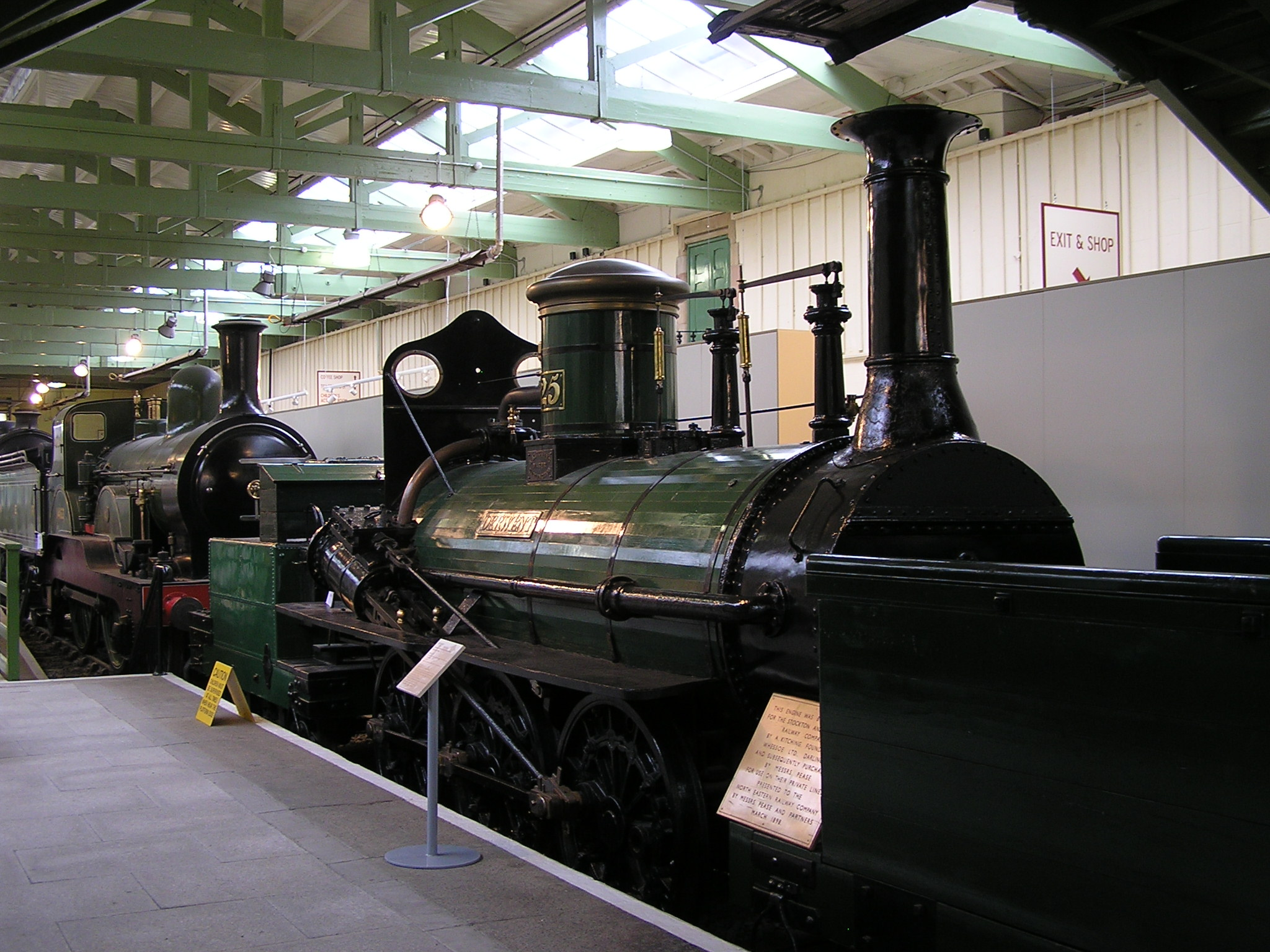
Derwent in 2009

Derwent is an 0-6-0 steam locomotive built in 1845 by William and Alfred Kitching for the Stockton and Darlington Railway (S&DR). It is preserved at Darlington Railway Centre and Museum, now known as Head of Steam.

== Design ==
Derwent was designed by Timothy Hackworth and built by W. & A. Kitching in Darlington, England in 1845. It is similar in design to two of their 1842 locomotives, Leader and Trader, with outside cylinders fixed at the trailing end of the boiler and four-foot diameter, six-wheeled coupled wheels.

Withdrawn from service in 1869, it was sold to Joseph Pease & Partners for use on their colliery lines and spent some time at the construction of the Waskerley Reservoir in County Durham. It took part in the Stephenson Centenary celebrations at Newcastle in 1881 and the Diamond Jubilee of Queen Victoria in 1887.

== Preservation ==
Derwent was presented to the North Eastern Railway (NER) in 1898 for preservation. After restoration the locomotive ran under its own steam in the 1925 Railway Centenary procession, and on trials the day before the procession it achieved a speed of 12 mph (19 km/h). After that it was on display alongside Locomotion No. 1 for many years on a plinth on one of the platforms at Darlington's main station, Bank Top. In the 1960s, it was removed and restored in near original condition, and then moved to the Darlington Railway Centre and Museum in the 1970s, located in the same building as Darlington's North Road railway station, where it remains on display on long-term loan from the National Railway Museum. It is now part of the National Collection.
