= North Eastern Locomotive Preservation Group =

The North Eastern Locomotive Preservation Group (NELPG) was formed in 1966 with the intention of preserving some of the steam locomotives then still working on regular goods or passenger trains in North East England. At the time of its formation, its first president was Wilbert Awdry, the author of The Railway Series books and the creator of Thomas the Tank Engine. Now the group owns four unique North Eastern steam locomotives, its aim is to have as many of its steam locomotives running on the main line or preserved lines as possible. In 2014, the LNER K1 (62005) ran on the North Yorkshire Moors Railway and on the Jacobite service in Scotland. The LNER Q6 (NER T2, 63395) was undergoing boiler repairs at the start of the season but finished the season on the North Yorkshire Moors Railway and the LNER J72 (NER E1, 69023) ran on the Wensleydale Railway. The group have two workshops, one at Hopetown Carriage Works, Darlington and another workshop and base at Grosmont, the northernmost station on the North Yorkshire Moors Railway. The shed at Grosmont is called deviation shed. Members of the group hold regular evening meetings to discuss railway subjects, have a membership newsletter, and have produced various publications. The group now also has a junior volunteers section, training young recruits at, mainly, the NYMR and Deviation Shed. These JVs will help with mainly the locomotives, although a small amount has been done on the carriages (K1 support coach).

== Locomotives ==
=== NELPG ===
- LNER Class J27 no. 65894 - Operational following overhaul completed in May 2018. Currently based on the NYMR. Visited the Wensleydale Railway in August 2018 & 2019.
- LNER Class J72 no. 69023 - Under overhaul at Hopetown Carriage Works. Semi-permanently based at the Wensleydale Railway.
- LNER Class K1 no. 62005 - Out of service, overhaul commenced at Carnforth MPD in October 2021. It is currently the NELPG's only mainline certified locomotive which means it is able to haul excursion trains on the mainline. When it isn't on the mainline, it is usually in service on the North Yorkshire Moors Railway (NYMR).
- LNER Class Q6 no. 63395 - Operational at the NYMR, having had a replacement cylinder fabricated between May 2023 and May 2025, owing to damage to the original, its most recent prior overhaul having been completed in September 2021.

=== Other ===
The group does not own the following locomotives but has looked after them in the past:

- LNER Peppercorn Class A2 60532 Blue Peter (contract ended August 2011)
- LNER Class Q7 no. 901
