= Whessoe =

English engineering firm

- Industry: Metal engineering
- Predecessor: W & A Kitching
- Founded: 1790
- Headquarters: Darlington, County Durham, UK
- Parent: Samsung C&T Corporation
- Website: whessoe.co.uk

Whessoe is a company based in Darlington and on Teesside in North East England. It was formerly a supplier of chemical, oil and nuclear plant and instrumentation, and today is a manufacturer of low temperature storage.

== History ==
=== Kitchings and I'Anson ===
The Whessoe Company traces its origins back to an iron foundry shop founded in 1790. That family business was inherited by William Kitching (d. 1850) and Alfred Kitching (1808–1882), both Quakers, who established the Hope Town Foundry in Darlington in 1832. (Note: 54.536278°N 1.556083°W, Hope Town Foundry (original location, −1860))

Both William and Alfred Kitching were on the board of the Stockton and Darlington Railway, as well as being shareholders. They built several locomotives for the railway, including subcontracted manufacturing and repair work from Timothy Hackworth. 1845 built, Hackworth designed, Tory class Derwent is preserved in the National Railway Museum collection.

In 1860, the Stockton and Darlington Railway purchased the 'Hope Town Foundry' site to extend its Hopetown Carriage Works and the Kitching business relocated to Whessoe Foundry also in Darlington. (Note: 54.538086°N 1.559017°W, Hope Town Foundry (1860–), also known as Whessoe Foundry) In 1861, A Kitching was recorded as employing 45 people.

The business passed from the Kitchings to their cousin Charles I'Anson. The term 'Whessoe Foundry' was first applied to Charles I'Anson & Company in the 1860s, the name Whessoe being a locality name applied to the foundry.

From 1850 to 1890 the company expanded into the manufacture of steel structures, cranes, and gas works equipment. In 1881 the company became a limited liability company.

=== Whessoe Foundry Company ===
In 1890 the Whessoe Foundry Company Limited was formed, and in 1920 the company was listed on the London Stock Exchange as Whessoe Foundry and Engineering Co Ltd, Shell acquired 51% of the shares.

From 1890 onwards the company mainly manufactured equipment for the gas and oil industries, such as gas holders. It also made linings for underground railway tunnels and later, equipment for the nuclear and petrochemical plants. Whessoe designed and constructed reactor vessels for power stations including Calder Hall and advanced gas-cooler reactors at Hunterston B and Hinkley B.

=== Whessoe LGA ===
Whessoe's business supplying low temperature gas storage equipment remained in Darlington, successively owned by Preussag Noell, Skanska and Al Rushaid. In 2013, it was acquired by Samsung C&T Corporation as Whessoe Engineering Ltd.

=== Whessoe Varec ===
In 1997 Endress+Hauser acquired the Whessoe Varec instrumentation business.

== Controversies ==
Whessoe Oil and Gas was revealed as a subscriber to the UK's Consulting Association, exposed in 2009 for operating an illegal construction industry blacklist, and was among 14 issued with enforcement notices by the UK Information Commissioner's Office.

== See also ==
- Varec code
