= Hopetown Carriage Works =

Carriage works in County Durham, England

Coordinates: 54.535875°N 1.556680°W

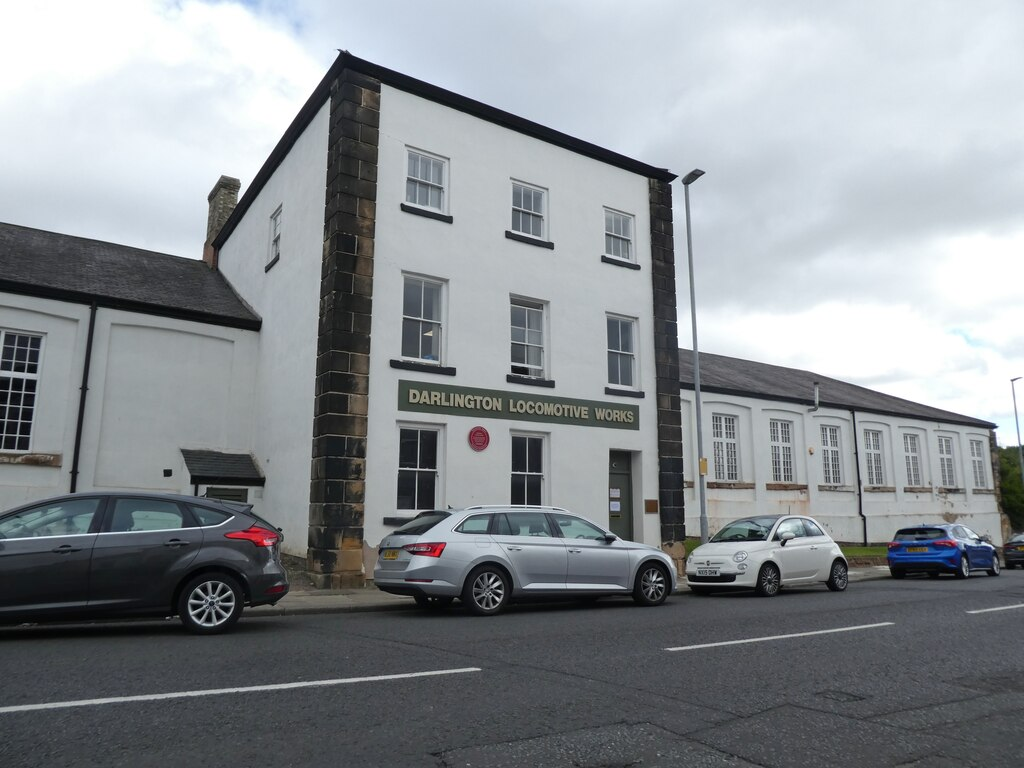
Hopetown Carriage Works seen from street side

Hopetown Carriage Works, also known as the Stockton and Darlington Railway Carriage Works, was a carriage works of the Stockton and Darlington Railway built in 1853 in Hopetown, near Darlington, County Durham, England.

The works built railway carriages from 1853 to around 1884. Now preserved, it is still used as a museum workshop.

== Description ==
The building was to a design by Joseph Spark, completed by architects Ross & Richardson of Darlington. It is constructed of coursed squared stone and has a roof of Welsh slate; the building consists of a two storey centre section with Venetian style entrance, with two single storey wings.

=== History ===
The building was used for the manufacture and maintenance of two axle railway carriages; there were two internal rail track running the length of the building and wings connected to the main network via a small turntables located in the central two storey building. The central building included lifting facilities (later removed). Construction on the site ended in the 1880s (about 1884.) with the introduction of longer wheelbase bogie vehicles for which the works was unsuited - all carriage manufacture was transferred to the York Railway Works after 1863 under the NER.

The building was later used as a store, and to repair wagons, as well as being used as a rifle range by the railway company.

In the 1980s the site and building was acquired by Darlington Borough Council and became part of the Darlington Railway Centre and Museum.

The building was Grade II listed in 1986.

=== Current use ===
The A1 Steam Locomotive Trust, constructors of the new locomotive 60163 Tornado took over the tenancy buildings east wing in 1995. The North Eastern Locomotive Preservation Group (NELPG) took over the west wing in 2002. The New Build LNER Class P2, is being built here by the same people that created Tornado. In 2023, after 28 years of building steam locomotives in the works, the A1 Steam Locomotive Trust left the works for a new site in Darlington.

== See also ==
- Billingham Manufacturing Plant
- Darlington Works
- Teesside Steelworks
- Darlington TMD
- Billingham Manufacturing Plant
- Bowesfield Works
