= Gilkes Wilson and Company =

Train maker based in Middlesbrough, North Yorkshire

Gilkes Wilson and Company was a British locomotive manufacturer at Teesside Engine Works in Middlesbrough which opened in 1843. Initially repairing locomotives, the company built its first engines in 1847.

== History ==
Gilkes and Wilson was formed as a partnership between Quakers Isaac Wilson and Edgar Gilkes.

Edgar Gilkes was a Middlesbrough councillor, mayor (1863–64) and alderman. He died in Grange-over-Sands in 1894.

In 1865 the company merged with Hopkins and Company (establishers of the Tees Side Iron Works, 1857) to become Hopkins Gilkes and Company.

The firm undertook design, construction and manufacture of the ironwork for the Deepdale and Belah viaducts (b.1857-1860) on the South Durham and Lancashire Union Railway to a design of Thomas Bouch and Robert Henry Bow.

In 1875, the name changed again to the Tees-side Iron and Engine Works Company Limited, having built 351 locomotives in total.

Subsequently, the firm worked with Bouch on the Tay Bridge, and had their reputation very badly damaged as a result of the Tay Bridge Disaster. The 1870s Long Depression forced several Cleveland iron firms out of business including Hopkins Gilkes.

The company closed in 1880.

== Customers ==
Edgar Gilkes had worked for the Stockton and Darlington Railway and large numbers were built for the line and the North Eastern Railway. Other customers were:

- York, Newcastle and Berwick Railway
- Leeds and Thirsk Railway
- Newmarket and Chesterford Railway
- Llanelly Railway
- Liskeard and Caradon Railway.
