= NER Class W =

Type and origin
- Power type: Steam
- Designer: Wilson Worsdell
- Builder: Gateshead Works
- Build date: 1907–08
- Total produced: 10
Specifications
- Configuration
  - Whyte: 4-6-0T
  - UIC: 2′C n2t
- Gauge: 4 ft 8 1/2 in (1,435 mm)
- Wheelbase: 26 ft 3 in (8.001 m)
- Length: 40 ft 8 1/2 in (12.408 m)
- Adhesive weight: 52 long tons (53 t; 58 short tons)
- Loco weight: 69.85 long tons (70.97 t; 78.23 short tons)
- Fuel type: Coal
- Fuel capacity: 2.25 long tons (2.29 t; 2.52 short tons)
- Water cap.: 1,500 imp gal (6,800 L; 1,800 US gal)
- Firebox
  - Grate area: 23 sq ft (2.1 m^{2})
- Boiler pressure: 170 lbf/in^{2} (1.17 MPa)
- Heating surface
  - Firebox: 130 sq ft (12 m^{2})
  - Tubes: 1,182 sq ft (109.8 m^{2})
  - Total surface: 1,312 sq ft (121.9 m^{2})
- Cylinders: Two, inside
- Cylinder size: 19 in × 26 in (483 mm × 660 mm)
- Valve gear: Stephenson
Career
- Operators: North Eastern Railway
- Numbers: 686–695
- Disposition: All rebuilt as Class W1 (1914–1917)

The NER Class W was a class of ten 4-6-0T locomotives built by the North Eastern Railway at their Gateshead Works between 1907 and 1908. They were all rebuilt as Class W1 4-6-2T locomotives between 1914 and 1917.

The ten locomotives were built in one batch, and were numbered 686 to 695. They were designed for the Scarborough to Whitby line, on which the Class O 0-4-4T locomotives then in use were having difficulty with the traffic, especially the three-mile (4.8 km) section of 1 in 40 (2.5%). However, the low fuel and water capacity was a barrier to operational efficiency, and so between September 1914 and January 1917 the whole class was rebuilt as 4–6–2T locomotives and reclassified W1.

Only one batch was built as the design was soon superseded by the Class D 4-4-4T.

Table of locomotives
| NER No. | Works No. | Date built | Date rebuilt |
|---|---|---|---|
| 686 | 84 | December 1907 | May 1915 |
| 687 | 85 | December 1907 | January 1917 |
| 688 | 86 | December 1907 | September 1914 |
| 689 | 87 | January 1908 | May 1915 |
| 690 | 88 | February 1908 | August 1916 |
| 691 | 89 | March 1908 | June 1915 |
| 692 | 90 | March 1908 | May 1916 |
| 693 | 91 | March 1908 | February 1916 |
| 694 | 92 | April 1908 | May 1915 |
| 695 | 93 | April 1908 | July 1915 |
