= Malton engine shed =

Former railway locomotive depot in North Yorkshire, England

- Interactive map of Malton engine shed

Location
- Location: Malton, North Yorkshire, England
- Coordinates: 54.1316°N 0.7994°W
- OS grid: SE785712

Characteristics
- Type: Steam
- Roads: 2
- Routes served: Thirsk and Malton line; Whitby Line; Driffield Line; York to Scarborough (emergency only)

History
- Opened: 1853
- Closed: 1963
- Original: North Eastern Railway
- Post-grouping: London and North Eastern Railway
- BR region: North Eastern
- Former depot code: 50F

Malton engine shed was a steam locomotive depot located by Malton railway station in North Yorkshire, England. The depot opened in 1853 to provide locomotives for the increase in traffic around Malton with the opening of the lines to Driffield and Gilling. It was closed in 1963.

== History ==
Initially, the line through Malton was just the link between York and Scarborough, but in 1853, the Thirsk and Malton line opened, which also had an end on junction with the Malton and Driffield Railway. The extra services which now terminated or started at Malton necessitated somewhere to stable engines, and so a shed was authorised in August 1853 at a cost of £435 (equivalent to £47,786 in 2025). The two-road shed was just to the southwest of the station building on the York side of the station, and could be accessed from either direction. Plans were unveiled in 1865 to build a new shed at a cost of £6,817, which could accommodate six engines, but eventually it was decided to enlarge the existing building in 1867 to a length of 250 feet (76 m) for £800.

A steam crane was provided at Malton for coaling the steam engines, and this would remain the method for fuelling throughout the life of the shed. The coal stage and turntable (installed in 1870) were located at the east end of the shed, with the two being dead-end roads with a west facing connection. Engine requirements in the early 1920s were just four, each with different trips to Driffield, Gilling and Whitby, however, by the 1930s the Gilling line was closed to local passenger trains, and in the 1950s the Driffield line closed too, but some freight on each branch meant that Malton shed retained an allocation of locomotives.

Engines allocated to Malton usually worked the lines towards Whitby, Gilling and Driffield, though they sometimes provided services on the York to Scarborough line when required to do so if the need arose.

Long-distance passenger trains still used the Gilling Line, and these needed assistance to run around at Malton and reverse direction. Trains from Scarborough to Newcastle (or Glasgow) and vice-versa did not have direct access to all lines without the need for some shunting. The train from Scarborough would pull into the station facing west, and a pilot engine would pull the train to Scarborough Road Junction so that the train was facing the correct way to proceed over the Gilling line to Thirsk and the East Coast Main Line.

In 1949, the shed was designated as "50F", a sub-shed of York ("50A"). The last service worked by an engine from Malton shed was on 13 April 1963, and the shed officially closed two days later. The site has since been levelled and cleared.

== Allocations ==
On 1 January 1923 its allocation consisted of 18 locomotives all of which were former North Eastern Railway locomotives. The table below shows the breakdown by type:

Class (NER classification)	Wheel Arrangement	Number allocated	Remarks
W1	4-6-2T	1	LNER loco class A6
G	4-4-0	1	LNER loco class D23
A	2-4-2T	4	LNER loco class F8
O	0-4-4T	2	LNER loco class G5
59	0-6-0	6	LNER loco class J22
1001	0-6-0	1	Was withdrawn during 1923 – surviving example in National Railway Museum, York.
398	0-6-0	2	Class withdrawn by 1928.
B	0-6-2T	1	LNER loco class N8

Allocation numbers in 1922 were 14 in 1923, 14 in 1939, and 13 in 1953 and 1959. At closure, the roster had only nine locomotives allocated to Malton. Eight of these locomotives were transferred to York ("50A"), and one engine went to Goole ("50D").

== See also ==
- Pickering engine shed
- Scarborough engine sheds
- Whitby engine shed
- York engine sheds and locomotive works
