= Whitby engine shed =

Former railway locomotive depot in North Yorkshire, England

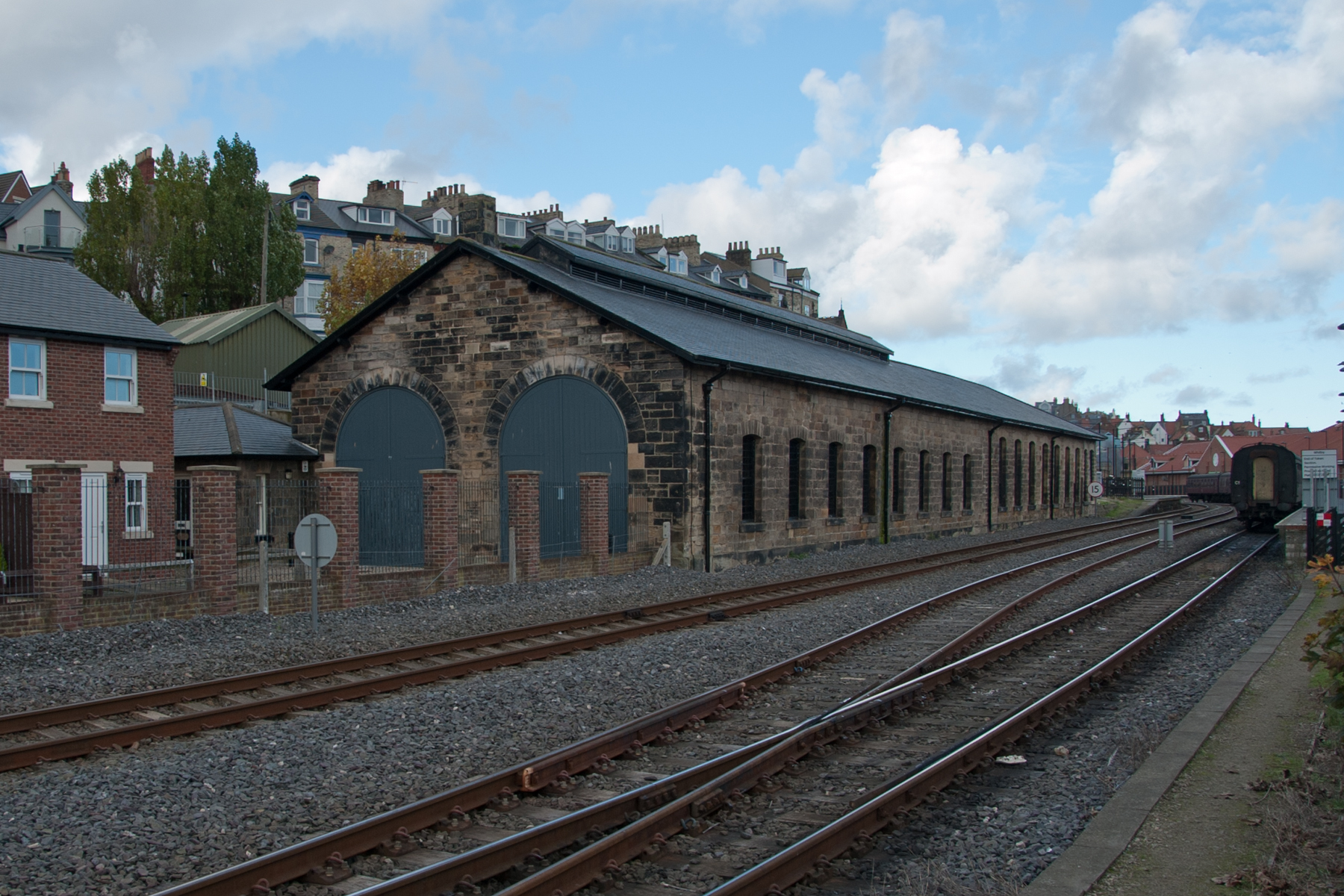
- Former engine shed at Whitby
- Interactive map of Whitby engine shed

Location
- Location: Whitby, North Yorkshire, England
- Coordinates: 54.4828°N 0.6141°W
- OS grid: NZ898106

Characteristics
- Type: Steam
- Roads: 2
- Routes served: Whitby to: Malton, Stockton, and Middlesbrough

History
- Opened: 1847
- Closed: 6 April 1959
- Pre-grouping: North Eastern Railway
- Post-grouping: London & North Eastern Railway
- BR region: North Eastern
- Former depot code: 50G

Whitby engine shed was a steam locomotive depot located at the south end of Whitby railway station (original Whitby Town) in North Yorkshire, England. The shed was opened in 1847, extended in the 1860s, and closed in 1959, when the closure of lines and dieselisation of the routes from Whitby took hold. The shed building, which was grade II listed in 1991, still stands, being utilised for various enterprises, and is now used as holiday accommodation.

== History ==
The first shed at Whitby was built by the York & North Midland Railway (Y&NM) company in 1847 when they converted the Whitby and Pickering Railway (W&P) from horse to steam locomotive operation, (the line had been acquired by the Y&NM two years earlier). The site of the engine shed is where the original W&P station was located. In 1847, this was closed and a new station was opened nearer to the town. The North Eastern Railway built a newer extension to the shed in 1868 on the same site. The engine shed was located on what was previously waterfront land where the Fishburn and Brodrick] company made ships. All of the land which was used for the station, engine shed and goods yard, was reclaimed from the River Esk.

The engine shed was equipped with two internal roads, a coaling road and an external siding for wheel and bogie changing. Access was only from the south end via a reversal at Bog Hall signal box. Between 1876 and 1912, a 50-foot (15 m) turntable was located just by the shed, but a larger one was opened further south after 1912. The shed had an office, workshop and forge at the northern end (at the edge of the station platforms), and a store at the southern end. Due to the west side of the shed facing a steep bank, no windows were installed on this side. On 16 September 1940, Whitby was subjected to an air raid by the Luftwaffe, with the goods shed and the approach to the station being damaged. The engine shed offices were also destroyed.

From 1948 until April 1959, when the depot closed, it was coded as 50G, as a sub-shed under the main depot at York (50A). The shed provided locomotives to work the lines radiating from Whitby north-westwards towards Loftus, westwards towards Stockton and Middlesbrough, and southwards towards Malton. Closure of the shed came about because of dieselisation in the Whitby area, especially with services towards Malton. The line to Loftus via Sandsend had closed in May 1958. Diesel Multiple Units that worked to and from Whitby after the closures of all lines except that from Middlesbrough via Glaisdale, were based at Darlington in the 1960s and 1970s.

== Post closure ==
After closure, the site was used as a fish-packing store, then later as a chandlery. The building has also been proposed as a cafe and art gallery, but since 2018, it has been divided into apartments for holiday lettings.

Since 1991, the building has been listed as a grade II structure, and is one of four G T Andrews designed sheds still extant in North Yorkshire.

== Allocations ==
One of the more unusual allocations at the shed was Edward Fletcher's 4-4-0 "Whitby Bogies" (NER Class 492). These engines were built specifically to deal with the tight curves in Newton Dale, and the gradients on the line between Grosmont and Pickering. The locomotives were built by Stephenson & Co. between 1864 and 1865. Another specialist class was the NER Class W 4-6-0T, built in 1907, but later rebuilt with extra coal carrying capacity. The 4-6-0Ts replaced the 4-4-0 Whitby Bogies on the lines that they were built for.

Sentinel steam railcars were also based at the shed in the 1930s, with three examples being shedded at Whitby for use on the lines in the non-tourist months when services reverted to steam-hauled trains with carriages.

== See also ==
- Pickering engine shed
- Malton engine shed
- Scarborough engine sheds
- York engine sheds and locomotive works
