= Scarborough engine sheds =

Locomotive depots in Scarborough, North Yorkshire, England

Scarborough engine shed
- Interactive map of Scarborough engine shed

Location
- Location: Scarborough, North Yorkshire, England
- Coordinates: 54.2685°N 0.4154°W

Characteristics
- Owner: Y&NMR; NER; LNER; BR
- Type: Steam
- Routes served: Scarborough to Hull; Scarborough to Pickering; Scarborough to Whitby; Scarborough to York

History
- Opened: 1845
- Closed: 19 May 1963
- Former depot code: 50E

Scarborough TPE depot
Characteristics
- Operator: TransPennine Express
- Depot code: SF
- Type: Locomotive and carriage
- Roads: 1
- Rolling stock: Class 68
- Routes served: Scarborough–Liverpool; Scarborough–York

History
- Opened: March 2019

Scarborough engine sheds are two locations used to service locomotives in the town of Scarborough, North Yorkshire, England. The first location was used between 1845 and 1963, and thereafter, locomotives were stabled within the station. In 2019, TransPennine Express opened up a new single road facility to service their leased Class 68 locomotives used on the Liverpool to Scarborough services.

== History ==
=== 1845–1963 ===
The first depot at Scarborough, was a two-road engine shed 0.5-mile (0.8 km) south of Scarborough railway station. The shed had been built by G. T. Andrews on the opening of the railway to York in 1845, to the dimensions of 100 feet (30 m) long, by 35 feet (11 m) wide. This had two lines within the shed, accessed from the south, so engines from Scarborough would have to reverse in. The depot also included a range of six houses, for the railway workers to be accommodated on site. By 1882, the shed proved to be too small for the locomotives needed to operate services, but additionally, like the residents of the 21st century, the owners of the private houses around the shed complained often about the nuisance from the railway shed, though this time it was because of the effects of smoke. So, the original depot was demolished and a roundhouse with fifteen internal roads was constructed with dimensions of 190 feet (58 m) by 120 feet (37 m), further south than the original depot. The roundhouse had an internal turntable, but was actually rectangular as viewed from outside unlike other roundhouses, and two of the roads were to access/egress the roundhouse, and the westernmost two were too short to accommodate locomotives. The cost, along with the earthworks and retaining wall was £8,369, (equivalent to £870,000 in 2025) but even so, due to the lack of space, a full roundhouse with twenty roads could not be constructed, which again hampered operations, so another shed was authorised further west which had eight roads.

A turntable of 50-foot (15 m) in diameter was authorised as part of the 1888 rebuild. This was replaced in 1924 by one of 60-foot (18 m) in front of the roundhouse. A turntable of the same size was installed at Gallows Close/Northfield Carriage Sidings in 1907, on the northern side of the town.

In June 1908, an excursion station was opened at Scarborough on the site of the original shed, which also saw the demolition of the original York and North Midland Railway shed. Between closure as the shed and its demolition, it had been used as a goods depot.

The foundations of the eight-road newest shed were constructed from made-up ground, and as a result, were not stable enough do that the roof had to be supported by extra stanchions as it was prone to subsidence. This didn't help, and in 1959, the roof covering the four roads nearest the running lines was taken down.

Whilst the NER did not code their depots, the LNER annotated the shed as S'BRO, then as SCA. Between 1949 and May 1963, when the shed was closed, it had the shedcode 50E, a sub-shed of York (50A). The introduction of DMUs into the area led to several local steam engines being stored at the shed, and in 1962, the roundhouse was used to store redundant Pacific steam engines sent to the site from the main shed at York. Although its official closure date was May 1963, all stock had been transferred away from Scarborough by April 1963, the last locomotive transfer being to York. Although the shed was listed as closed, it continued to service locomotives working excursions for some years afterwards.

=== 1963–2018 ===
The end of steam operations on British Railways in 1968, prompted BR to remove the turntable and fill the pit in. Thereafter, locomotives were sent to the Filey Holiday Camp branch to be turned on the triangular junction there. However, the Filey Holiday Camp branch closed in November 1977, and in 1981, a 70-foot (21 m) turntable was again installed at Scarborough to allow steam locomotives that arrived on excursion trains to be turned for the outward journey. This replacement turntable had previously been at Gateshead depot and its installation was funded by Scarborough Borough Council, which was keen to promote the steam-hauled excursions into the town. After the sheds stopped being used for railway traffic, carriages and locomotives were stabled in the station area at Scarborough, with a Class 03 shunting carriages between the platforms and the carriage sidings, which were south of the station.

=== 2019 onwards ===
A new depot was built and opened in 2019 with a cost of £7 million. It is located in the same area as the previous depot. The newer facility has been given the TOPS code of SF, which was up until 1997 the TOPS code for Stratford TMD.

Complaints in 2020 about the noise of the Class 68 locomotives (Nova 3 sets) at the new depot, led to an unprecedented move to close the depot overnight, with any activities formerly undertaken at the one-road depot being sorted whilst the trainset is stabled in the station at Scarborough. However, complaints persisted from local residents into 2023 about the "throbbing, thundering, and reverberating noise emanating from the site."

== North Bay Railway ==
A three-road engine shed exists on the North Bay Railway opposite Scarborough's Peasholm Park. The lines into the shed face south into the station loop at Peasholm Park station. The railway's gauge is 20 inches (510 mm).

== See also ==
- Malton engine shed
- Pickering engine shed
- Whitby engine shed
- York engine sheds and locomotive works
