= LNER Class A8 =

Class of British steam locomotives (1931–1936)

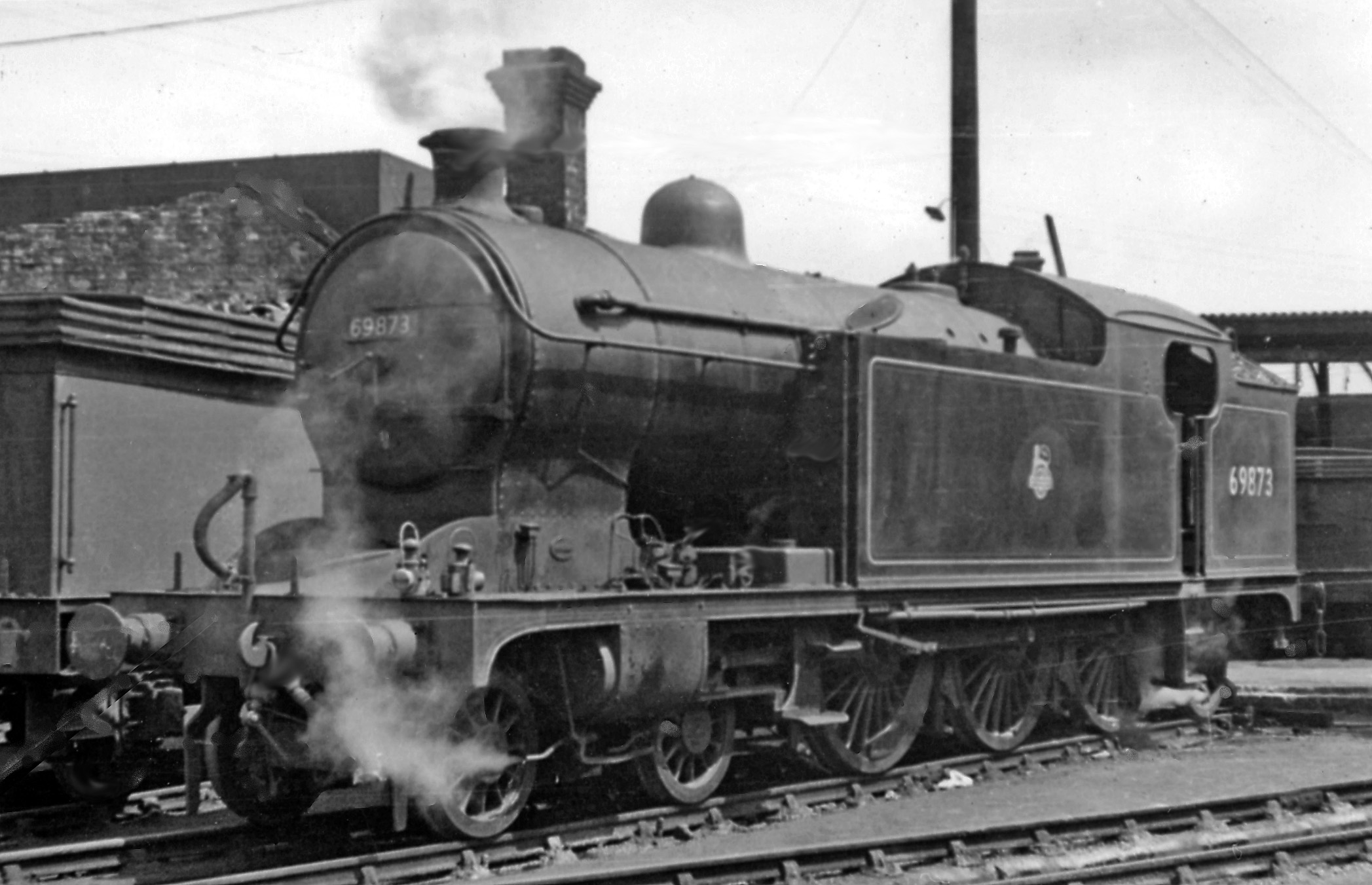
- A8 4-6-2T No. 69873 at Middlesbrough Locomotive Depot 1954
Type and origin
- Power type: Steam
- Designer: Vincent Raven and Nigel Gresley
- Build date: 1931–1936
- Total produced: 45
Specifications
- Configuration
  - Whyte: 4-6-2T
  - UIC: 2′C1′ h3t
- Leading dia.: 3 ft 1 1/4 in (0.946 m)
- Driver dia.: 5 ft 9 in (1.753 m)
- Trailing dia.: 3 ft 9 in (1.143 m)
- Wheelbase: 33 ft 3 in (10.13 m)
- Length: 42 ft 6 in (12.95 m)
- Axle load: 17.8 long tons (18.1 t; 19.9 short tons)
- Loco weight: 86.8 long tons (88.2 t; 97.2 short tons)
- Fuel capacity: 4 long tons (4.1 t; 4.5 short tons)
- Water cap.: 2,000 imp gal (9,100 L; 2,400 US gal)
- Firebox
  - Grate area: 23 sq ft (2.1 m^{2})
- Boiler: 4 ft 9 in (1.45 m)
- Boiler pressure: 175 psi (1.21 MPa)
- Heating surface
  - Firebox: 124 sq ft (11.5 m^{2})
  - Tubes: 680 sq ft (63 m^{2})
  - Flues: 280.6 sq ft (26.07 m^{2})
  - Total surface: 1,084.6 sq ft (100.76 m^{2})
- Superheater
  - Heating area: 191.134 sq ft (17.757 m^{2})
- Cylinders: 3
- Cylinder size: 16 1/2 in × 26 in (419 mm × 660 mm)
- Valve gear: Stephenson
Performance figures
- Tractive effort: 22,940 lbf (102.0 kN)
Career
- Operators: London and North Eastern Railway, British Railways
- Withdrawn: 1957–1960
- Disposition: All scrapped

The London and North Eastern Railway (LNER) Class A8 was a type of 4-6-2T steam locomotive, designed by both Vincent Raven and Nigel Gresley. They were rebuilt from the LNER Class H1s, a 4-4-4T class.

== Overview ==
In 1931, H1 No. 2162 was rebuilt as a 4-6-2T and given the A8 classification. After a series of trials throughout the North East Area, all of the remaining H1s were rebuilt as A8 4-6-2Ts between 1933 and 1936. During the process of rebuilding, the boiler was modified to include a Robinson-type superheater rather than the original Schmidt superheater. In 1935, further modifications resulted in the A8 boiler being interchangeable with the A6, A7, and T1 classes.

== Service ==
The rebuilt A8s could easily work the heavy suburban traffic and long distance coastal trains on which they were put to work. They were also welcome replacements for the ageing G5 0-4-4Ts which had been working these services. Allocations of the 45 locomotives were split between the North East / Newcastle area, the Yorkshire Coast Whitby and Scarborough, Hull, and Leeds (Neville Hill).

== Technical details ==
- Weight: 86 long tons 18 cwt (194,700 lb or 88.3 t)
- Boiler pressure: 175 lbf/in^{2} (1.21 MPa), superheated
- Cylinders: three, 16.5 by 26 in (419 by 660 mm)
- Driving wheels: 5 ft 9 in (1.753 m)
- Tractive effort: 22,940 lbf (102.0 kN)
- Number sequence in (1957/57) was from 69850 to 69894 (previously 9850 to 9894).

== Withdrawal ==
Diesel railcars were rapidly introduced during the 1950s, and the A8s quickly became surplus to requirements. Withdrawals started in 1957, and the A8 was extinct by the end of 1960.
