= Reading Company C1a Class =

Class of 4 American 4-4-4 locomotives

P&RR C1a class 4-4-4 Reading Type and P7sa Class 4-4-2 Atlantic Type locomotives
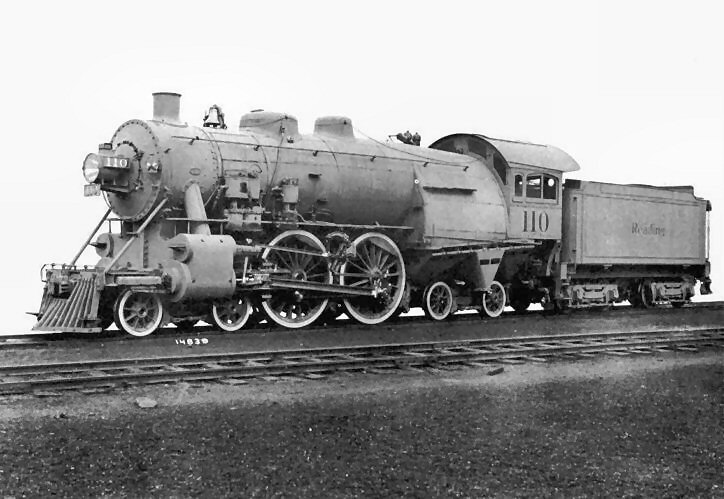
- Reading No. 110, as built
Type and origin
- Power type: Steam
- Builder: Reading Company
- Build date: 1915
- Total produced: 4
- Rebuild date: 1916
Specifications
- Configuration
  - Whyte: 4-4-4
- Gauge: 4 ft 8 1/2 in (1,435 mm)
- Driver dia.: 6 ft 8 in (2.032 m)
- Loco weight: 230,800 lb (104,700 kg)
- Fuel type: Coal
- Boiler pressure: 240 psi (1.65 MPa)
- Cylinders: Two, outside
- Cylinder size: 23.5 in × 26 in (597 mm × 660 mm)
Performance figures
- Tractive effort: 36,604 lbf (162.82 kN)
Career
- Retired: 1940-1949
- Scrapped: 1941-1949
- Disposition: All scrapped by 1949

The Reading Company C1a Class were a type of 4-4-4 steam locomotive built for the Philadelphia and Reading Railway in 1915. Four locomotives were built, road numbers #110-113. They used front and rear trucks that were effectively identical. During a year of operation from 1915-1916, they proved to be quite unstable; after that year, they were rebuilt to 4-4-2 "Atlantic" locomotives, reclassified as P7sa, and renumbered #350-353 they remained as Rebuilt 4-4-2 Atlantic Type locomotives from 1916 to the 1940’s . All 4 locomotives pulled passenger trains and some freight trains as larger and powerful steam locomotives were built in the 1920’s and 1930’s and 1940’s took over pulling passenger trains and all 4 locomotives were replaced by 1940 and 1949 and scrapped from 1941-1949 .
