= Pickering engine shed =

Former railway locomotive depot in North Yorkshire, England

Pickering Engine Shed
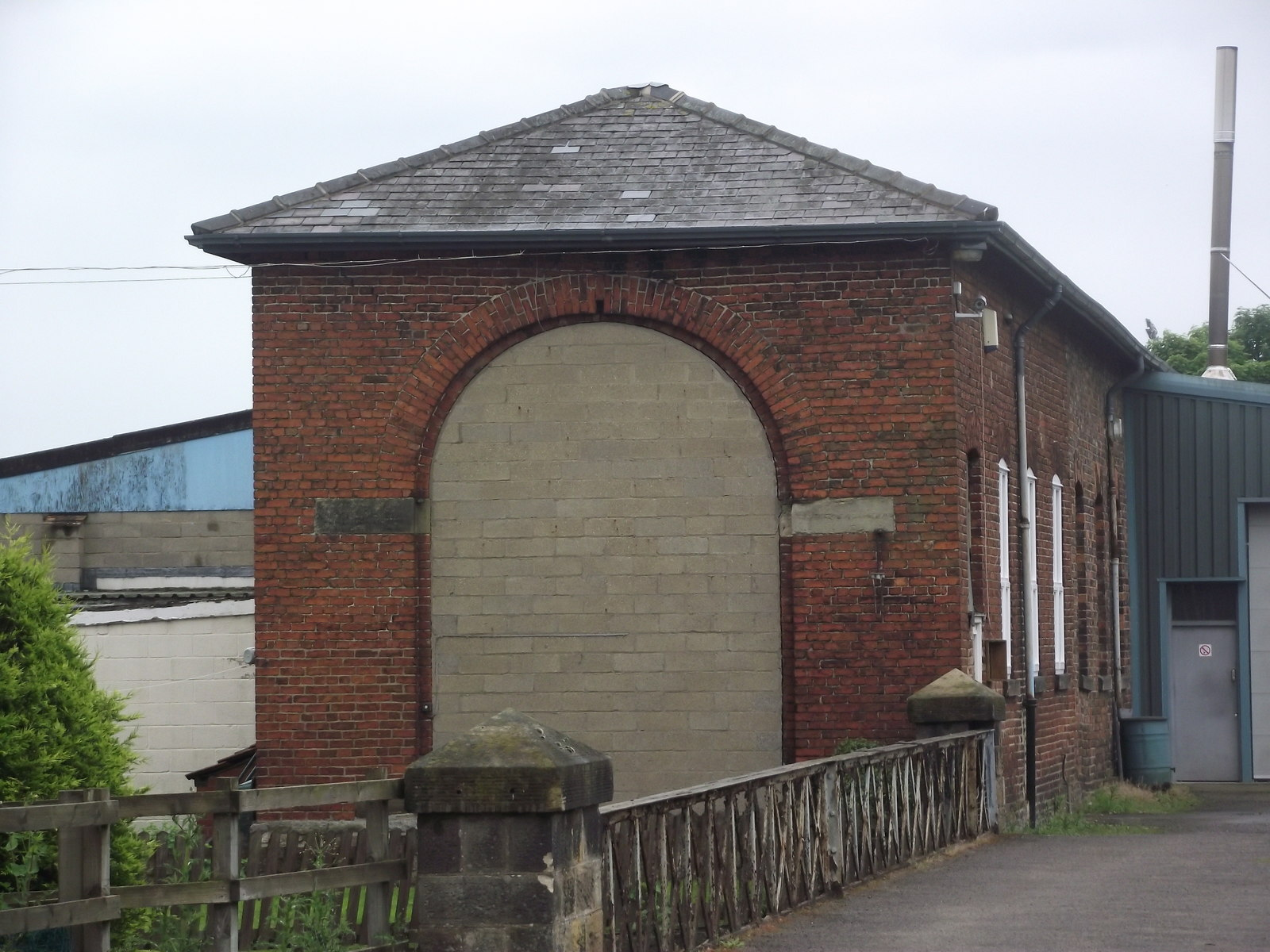
- Former engine shed
- Interactive map of Pickering Engine Shed

Location
- Location: Pickering, North Yorkshire, England
- Coordinates: 54.2443°N 0.7792°W
- OS grid: SE796839

Characteristics
- Type: Steam locomotives
- Roads: 1

History
- Opened: 1846
- Closed: 6 April 1959
- Original: York and North Midland Railway
- Pre-grouping: NER
- Post-grouping: LNER
- BR region: Eastern Region
- Former depot code: PKG (LNER); 50F (British Rail)

Pickering engine shed was a small steam motive power depot (MPD) which supplied locomotives for the services on the four railway lines radiating out of Pickering, in North Yorkshire, England. It opened in 1846, and was closed in 1959. The shed was located south of the railway station across Bridge Street and Hungate (the A170 road); it is still standing and is now in private use.

== History ==
The first railway to reach Pickering was the Whitby and Pickering Railway, which was isolated from the rest of the UK rail network until the York & North Midland Railway (Y&NMR) opened their Rillington Junction to Pickering line in 1845. The Y&NMR built sheds at Whitby (1847), Pickering (1846) and Malton (1853) to provide motive power for the line to Whitby, but later, all sheds had increased traffic as more lines opened in their areas. The shed was built to a design by George Townsend Andrews and was initially 43-foot (13 m) long and could only house one locomotive, but in 1874, work began to extend the shed to accommodate two engines. This was completed in 1876 at a cost of £604 (equivalent to £60,000 in 2025), and the shed was lengthened to 69-foot (21 m). The shed was located south of Pickering railway station, past Bridge Street and Hungate, the A170 road, and was on the edge of Pickering Beck.

A 42-foot (13 m) turntable was provided by the engine shed in 1870, but this was superseded by a 50-foot (15 m) turntable north of the station at Pickering. (Note: Benham theorises that the turntable was probably moved so that engines working the York to Pickering service via Gilling could be turned after arrival at Pickering station. These services were worked by D20s and D49s.) Coaling of steam engines was undertaken by a hand-operated crane which was installed in 1894. It could lift the coal up over the locomotives and tip the coal into the space on the engine. At the Grouping (1923), the shed became an LNER asset and had two sets of main duties, covered by an early and a late shift. The shed was required to supply an extra locomotive mid-morning on Thursdays to take a special train to Scarborough for market day. This extra duty was accomplished by not shunting the goods yards in the area on Thursday mornings. The LNER coded the shed as PKG, whilst under British Rail working, the shed was given the code of 50F, which was actually the code for Malton engine shed, and Pickering acted as a sub-shed of Malton, though both were, in effect, sub-sheds of York (50A).

The shed was closed on 6 April 1959. It has been noted as one of the few ex North Eastern Railway country sheds which was not demolished after closure, being used as a workshop and to house a timber merchants.

== Locomotives ==
Over the course of its life, Pickering shed was given various locomotives to maintain such as BTP tanks, G5s and various 0-6-0s, notably J21, J22 and J23. One notable example was the Y3 Sentinel shunter (no. 81) which worked the sidings in and around Pickering. The Y3 was also a stand-by locomotive for the Forge Valley Line in case the usual motive power on that route (a Sentinel railcar) was unvailable; however, there is no record of this ever having taken place. Its last allocated locomotive was G5 67308, which was withdrawn in 1955, and thereafter, the shed was used to stable locomotives provided from Malton engine shed.

== See also ==
- Malton engine shed
- Scarborough engine sheds
- Whitby engine shed
- York engine sheds and locomotive works
