= York engine sheds and locomotive works =

Railway engine sheds and locomotive works in York, England

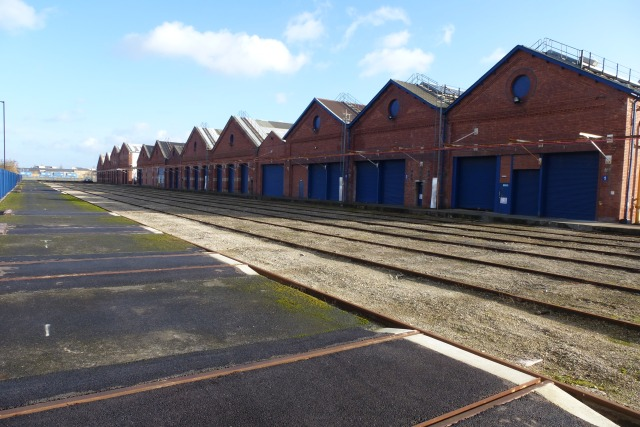
Holgate Road carriage works, York, in 2014

There were a number of engine sheds and railway works located in York. The large York North engine shed became the National Railway Museum in 1975.

== Overview ==
=== Engine sheds ===
The following engine sheds were located in York:

- York North steam shed, 1878–1967
- York South steam shed, 1847–1967
- York Diesel Depot, 1967–1982
- York Layerthorpe, 1913–1981
- Siemens Train Maintenance Centre, 2007–present day
- Rowntrees (Industrial site with engine shed), 1909–1987

=== Railway works ===
For a complete picture of activity in the York area, the three railway works located in the city are also included in this survey, as at one time they have been responsible for the maintenance of locomotives.

- Queen Street locomotive works
- York Wagon works
- Holgate Road carriage works

=== Railway companies ===
Before 1923, several railway companies ran trains to York. By 1853 the North Eastern Railway (NER) was the dominant operator, and by the 1870s the other significant operators were:

- Midland Railway
- Great Northern Railway
- Lancashire and Yorkshire Railway
- Great Eastern Railway
- London and North Western Railway
- Great Central Railway

After 1923, the North Eastern Railway and Great Northern Railway were taken over by the London and North Eastern Railway, which remained the dominant operator in the area. The other three companies became part of the London Midland & Scottish Railway. Before 1922, the Great Eastern Railway had come to an arrangement with the NER, which had worked their trains through from Lincoln.

== York North ==
York North was opened by the North Eastern Railway in 1878, the year after the current York station was opened. With the relocation of the station outside of the city walls, it made operational sense to have an engine shed at the north end of the station, as many trains changed locomotives at York. It also had good access to the freight yards and the carriage sheds located at Clifton.

On opening, the shed consisted of three roundhouses each with a 45-foot turntable linked to a coaling stage.

In 1891, the original 45-foot turntable in no 2 roundhouse was replaced by a 50-foot turntable. A new water tank was provided in 1909. In 1911, a fourth roundhouse was built, and the two existing 45-foot turntables were replaced with electrically operated turntables. All these improvements were complete by 1915.

In 1923, operation of the shed became the responsibility of the London and North Eastern Railway.

In 1932, further modernisation took place with the fitting of a 70-foot Mundt type turntable built by Ipswich firm Ransomes & Rapier and the installation of a mechanical coaling plant. Before this, the coaling would have been done by hand.

The North shed eventually contained four roundhouses. Locomotives were stabled around these under cover and would move off the shed onto their next duty. Normal procedure was that arriving locomotives would have their ash cleared out from the firebox before being coaled and watered in anticipation of the next duty. If a locomotive required repair, the coaling and watering was sometimes done after the repair had been effected.

As the organisational structure of the railways changed in 1923 with The Grouping and with nationalisation in 1948, so the importance of York North shed rose and York South shed fell.

In April 1942, the shed was hit by a bomb during an air raid during the Baedeker Blitz and a number of locomotives were destroyed.

The British Railways depot code allotted in 1949 was 50A. These codes are allocated to locomotives to show the depot responsible for the maintenance of the locomotive.

Rebuilding of the shed followed in 1954 with roundhouses 1 and 2 being demolished and replaced by a straight shed. Roundhouses 3 and 4 were re-roofed, and the 70-foot turntable in roundhouse 4 was renewed.

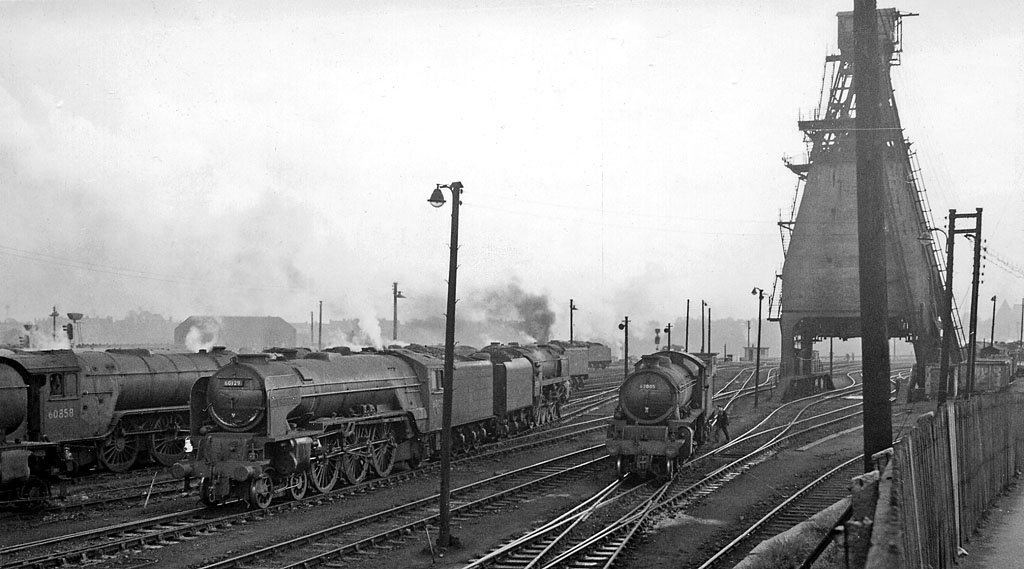
In this 1961 view prominent locomotives are V2 2-6-2 No. 60858, A1 4-6-2 No. 60129 'Guy Mannering' and K1 2-6-0 No. 62005. Note the mechanised Coaling Plant.

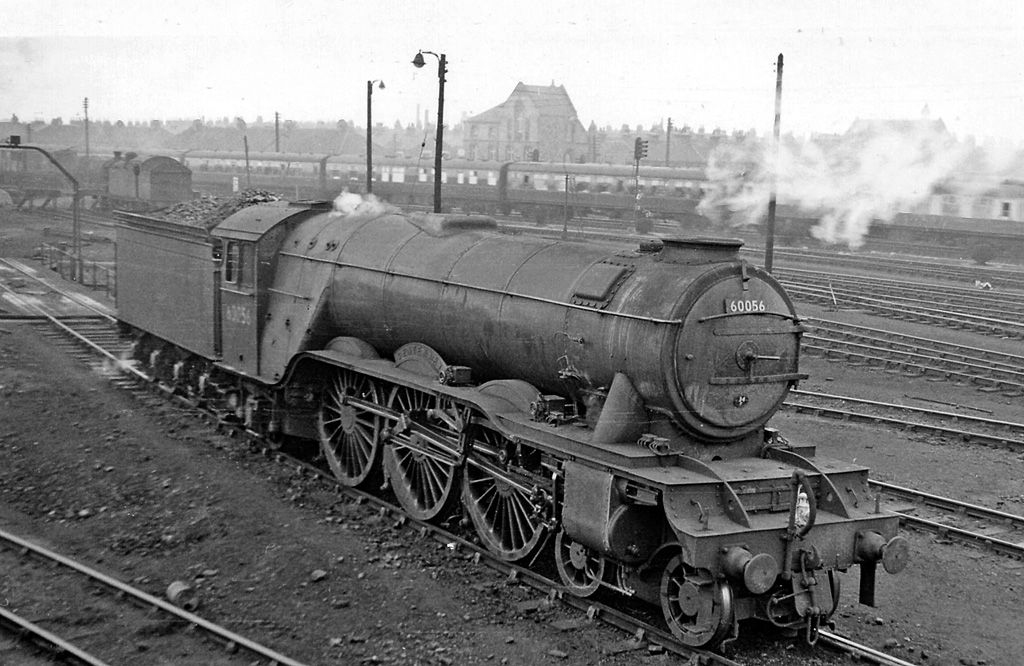
A3 Pacific No. 60056 'Centenary' is on the line to the 70-foot turntable at the end of the Yard. Beyond is the main ECML coming away from the north end of York Station alongside the Clifton Carriage Sidings. In the left background can be seen an ex-North Eastern A8 4-6-2T.11 April 1960

The roundhouses were closed to steam traction in 1967 and the straight shed became York diesel depot (see below). In March 1970 an attempt was made to demolish the mechanical coaling plant, but the explosives used left the structure leaning over. Attempts were made to pull it over with hawsers attached to locomotives, but they proved fruitless, and it was only in May that a crane equipped with a wrecking ball finished the job.

Following renovation of the roundhouses, the premises were occupied by the National Railway Museum which opened in 1975. When the diesel depot closed in 1983, this was also taken over by the museum, and part of this area is still used to overhaul preserved locomotives and rolling stock.

=== 1923 allocation ===
The allocation of locomotives to York North covered many classes of locomotive, ranging from small shunting engines to main line locomotives capable of hauling major express services. The table below shows the allocation on 1 January 1923 (the first day of the London and North Eastern Railway taking over from the North Eastern). The LNER locomotive classification has been used with the North Eastern Railway locomotive classification in brackets. No Great Northern class numbers have been included.

Class	Wheel Arrangement	Railway	Number allocated
A7 (Y)	4-6-2T	NER	2
B15 (S2)	4-6-0	NER	6
B16 (S3)	4-6-0	NER	16
C6 (V)	4-4-2	NER	4
C7 (Z)	4-4-2	NER	13
– (38)	4-4-2?	NER	1
D20 (R)	4-4-0	NER	15
D21 (R1)	4-4-0	NER	7
E5 (1463)	2-4-0	NER	15
-(901)	2-4-0	NER	1
-(1440)	2-4-0	NER	1
G6 (BTP)	0-4-4T	NER	5
– (398)	0-6-0	NER	6
J21 (C)	0-6-0	NER	8
J24 (P)	0-6-0	NER	1
J26 (P2)	0-6-0	NER	11
J27 (P3)	0-6-0	NER	5
J71 (E)	0-6-0T	NER	11
J72 (E1)	0-6-0T	NER	9
J77 (290)	0-6-0T	NER	6
X3 (190)	2-2-4T	NER	1

The following Great Northern Railway locomotives were allocated to the area. Before 1923, these would have been looked after at York South, but after that date they were looked after at York North. Including these, York North had an allocation of 143 engines.

Class	Wheel Arrangement	Railway	Number allocated
C2	4-4-2	GNR	3
D2	4-4-0	GNR	8
D3	4-6-0	GNR	3

=== 1943 allocation ===
The Second World War saw the highest number of locomotives allocated to York North. This was the allocation in March 1943:

Class	Wheel Arrangement	Railway	Number allocated
A1	4-6-2	LNER	5
A7	4-6-2T	NER	5
B16	4-6-0	NER	69
C1	4-4-2	GNR	2
C7	4-4-2	NER	10
D20	4-4-0	LNER	4
D49	4-4-0	LNER	13
J21	0-6-0	NER	13
J71	0-6-0T	NER	14
J72	0-6-0T	NER	11
J77	0-6-0T	NER	9
V2	2-6-2T	LNER	20
Y8	0-4-0T	NER	1
D	4-4-0	SECR	2

Of special note are the two Southern Railway D class locomotives – it was not unusual for foreign locomotives to be transferred around the country. There is some doubt about what these locomotives are. Hoole states they are D class 4-4-0s from the London Brighton and South Coast Railway whilst Appleby states they are D class 4-4-4 locomotives. The only Southern Railway D class engine was a former South Eastern and Chatham 4-4-0 (one of which sits in the National Railway Museum in 2012. A number of Southern Railway King Arthur class locomotives were based in the Newcastle area during the war and were also frequent visitors to both York sheds.

GNR – Great Northern Railway LNER – London North Eastern Railway NER – North Eastern Railway SECR – South Eastern and Chatham Railway (became Southern Railway in 1923)

=== 1964 allocation ===
By 1964 there were a number of diesel locomotives as well as steam locomotives. Four years later, the steam locomotives had been withdrawn.

Class	Wheel Arrangement	Railway	Number allocated
4MT	2-6-0	LMS	4
A1	4-6-2	LNER	13
B1	4-6-0	LNER	11
B16	4-6-0	NER	5
J27	0-6-0	NER	2
K1	2-6-0	LNER	18
V2	2-6-2	LNER	26
WD	2-8-0	WD	7
9F	2-10-0	BR	8
40	1CO-CO1	BR	33
03	0-6-0DM	BR	15
04	0-6-0DM	BR	4
08	0-6-0DE	BR	15
24	Bo-Bo	BR	4
25	Bo-Bo	BR	1

Note that almost all the small tank engines such as the J77 class have been replaced by diesel shunters of class 03,04 and class 08. 42 years after the first survey, York still had an allocation of NER locomotives – 2 × J27 and 5 × B16. As well as the main line diesels, there were some powerful steam freight locomotives allocated to York, such as the WD and 9F classes. The total allocation at this time was 166 locomotives.

- LMS – London Midland and Scottish
- WD – War Department
- DE = Diesel Electric
- DM – Diesel Mechanical

== York South ==
The original engine sheds at York were built on the York South site and designed to service the original station, which was a dead-end terminus within the city walls (although there was a temporary station outside the city walls before this). As the railways developed, it became apparent that this terminus was inadequate in terms of size and operational practicability; southbound trains had to reverse in from the main line, necessitating additional journey time. In the 1870s the decision was taken to move to a new site outside the city walls, and the new station (still in use in 2019) was opened.

The oldest shed on site was a three-road straight shed, probably built for the Great North of England Railway in 1840/1, which remained in use until it was demolished in 1963. This was originally built with a single track serving a 12-foot diameter turntable. The dimensions were 153 feet × 54 feet.

The York and North Midland Railway built a shed in this area, but this was demolished when the new station was built in 1877. Another four engine sheds were built in this area. The first two were roundhouses completed in 1849/50 and 1851/2, each with 16 stalls and 42-foot turntables. These were designed by the YNMR engineer-in-chief Thomas Cabry. One of the roundhouses was out of use by 1923 and used for wagon sheet repairs. Later, a NER petrol-engined saloon was kept there. The earlier roundhouse building was destroyed by fire in October 1921. The second roundhouse remained in use until 1961, although largely for stabling purposes. The two roundhouses were conjoined.

A third larger roundhouse was built in 1863 with a 45-foot turntable and space for 18 locomotives. This was an 18-sided octadecagon and was 172 feet in diameter. It was designed by NER architect Thomas Prosser (who also built York station). This was closed in May 1961 and demolished in November 1963.

Little is known about the other straight shed, although it was in use as a signal fitting shop before being demolished in 1937 when new platforms were built at York station (the current platforms 11 and 12).

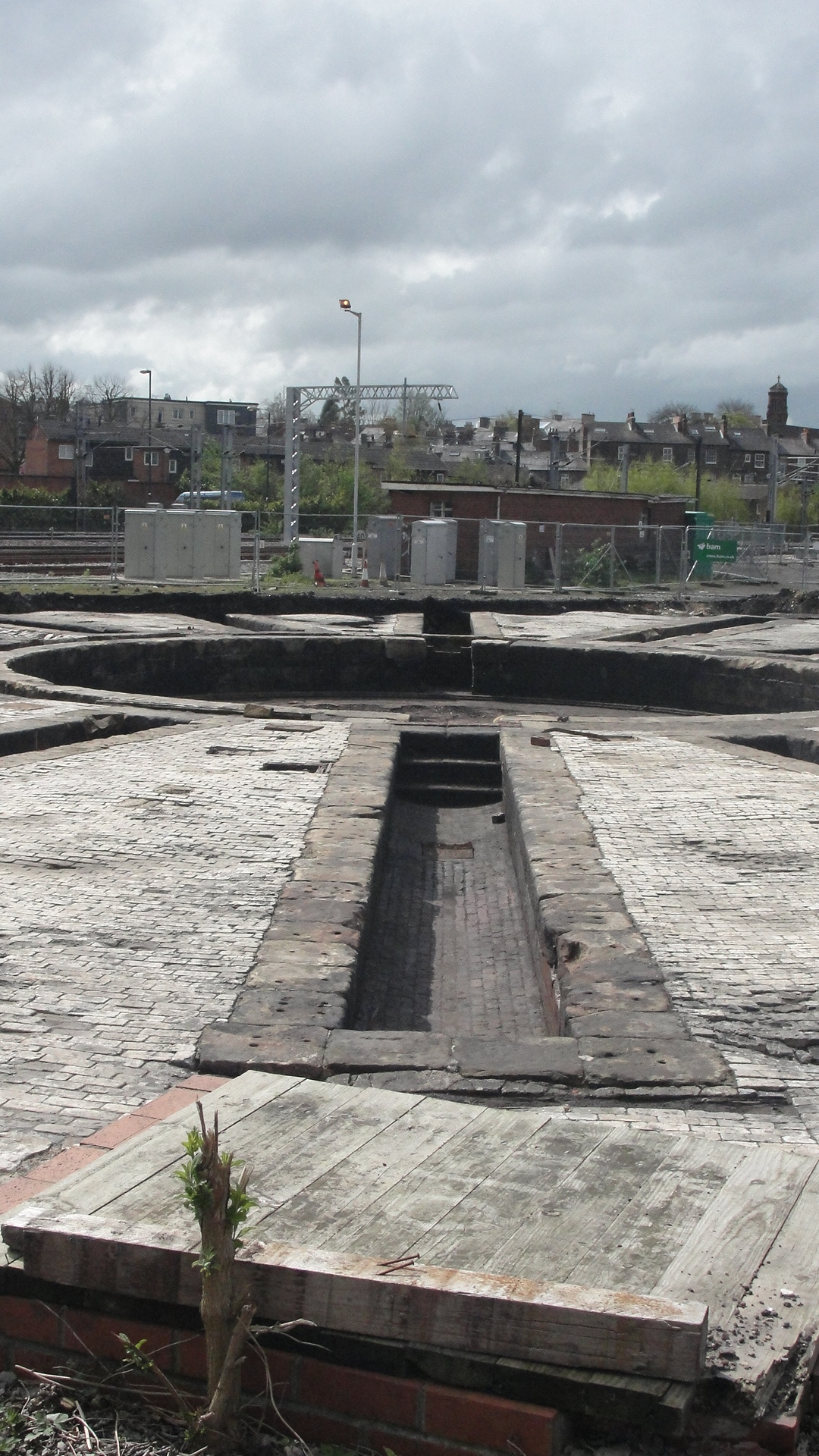
Inspection pit at one of the former York South roundhouses. April 2012.

Once York North shed was opened in 1878, York South went into decline with the NER largely decamping to the North shed. That said, NER locomotives did continue to be stabled at York South. Visiting locomotives were for a period hosted at York South before using the Queen Street site from 1909 (after the south end of York station was re-modelled) and then returning to York South in 1925.

After demolition of the buildings took place in 1963, the site was largely unused. A turning triangle has occupied the site (used for the turning of steam locomotives), and a couple of short sidings used to stable diesel locomotives are adjacent to the station.

In 2012, the turntable pits and ground-level remains of the sheds were excavated prior to the building of a new Network Rail signalling centre. At the end of October 2012, the remains were being covered over in anticipation of work starting on the new signalling centre.

== York Diesel Depot ==
After the last roundhouses (Numbers 3 and 4) were closed in 1967 and steam locomotives ceased to be allocated to York, the remaining allocation of diesel locomotives was maintained in the straight shed which had been built to replace roundhouses no 1 and 2 in 1954.

The following classes of diesel locomotive were allocated to York during this time:

- British Rail Class 03
- British Rail Class 04
- British Rail Class 05
- British Rail Class 20
- British Rail Class 24
- British Rail Class 25
- British Rail Class 31
- British Rail Class 37
- British Rail Class 40
- British Rail Class 47
- British Rail Class 55

The depot was home to the Class 55 Deltic locomotives from May 1979 up until their withdrawal in 1982. At this time, they had been displaced from the express workings on the East Coast Main Line and were operating secondary stopping services on that route as well as cross-Pennine services to Liverpool Lime Street.

The depot was closed in January 1982, but stabling was undertaken in the sidings to the north of the site for at least another 18 months. This is the site of the 2005 depot built for Trans-Pennine Express DMUs. The table below shows the final allocation of locomotives (all British Railways designs).

Class	Wheel Arrangement	Number allocated
Class 08	0-6-0DE	9
Class 31	A1A-A1A	23
Class 47	Co–Co	14

== York Layerthorpe ==
There was a small locomotive shed on the independent Derwent Valley Light Railway at York (Layerthorpe) railway station. This was a single-tracked shed at the end of the platform at Layerthorpe. The first shed on the site was of wooden construction, but this was replaced at some point with a corrugated iron shed.

The railway had a number of railcars in the 1920s, but freight was worked by NER/LNER or BR locomotives. The table below lists the stock owned by the company in the 1920s.

Description	Wheel Arrangement	Notes
Rail Lorry	0-4-0	Built by The British Four-wheel Drive Tractor Lorry Super Engineering Company – trialed unsuccessfully in 1923
Railbus (2)	0-4-0	Ford chassis with body built by C.H.Roe of Crossgates (Leeds). Operated 1924-1926 when road bus competition saw them sold to County Donegal Railways.
Sentinel	0-4-0T	Works no 6076. Operated on DVLR 1925–1929, before being sold to Summerson and Sons of Darlington. Scrapped c1971.

Between 1929 and 1969, the line was worked by main-line locomotives.

In 1969 the DVLR decided to buy two ex-British Rail Class 04 shunters to operate services rather than hiring in British Rail Class 03 locomotives. The table below lists the locomotives owned by the DVLR

Number/Name	Wheel Arrangement	Notes
1 Lord Wenlock	0-6-0DM	Former BR Class 04 D2293. Purchased 1969 – sold in 1982 to Buckinghamshire Railway Centre.
2	0-6-0DM	Former BR Class 04 D2245. Purchased 1969 – sold in 1978 to the Shackerstone Railway
D2329	0-6-0DM	Former BR Class 04 bought for spares and subsequently scrapped in 1969
Claude Thompson	0-4-0DM	John Fowler built engine – works number 4210142 (1958) purchased from British Pipeline agency in 1978 and sold in 1982 to Buckinghamshire Railway Centre.
69023 Joem	0-6-0T	British Railways built locomotive of North Eastern RailwayClass J72. Operated on the line 1977–1979, when it was sold back to the previous owner's family. In 2015, on Wensleydale Railway

Joem was purchased to run a short-lived steam train passenger operation.

The line closed on 27 September 1981.

There are no remains of the shed (or the station) on the site, although the track bed is now a cycle path.

== Siemens train maintenance depot ==
The Leeman Road railway depot in York was built for Siemens between 2005 and 2007 for maintenance of the new Class 185 diesel multiple units acquired at the same time for use on the new Transpennine franchise operated by First TransPennine Express.

== Locomotive and rolling stock works ==
=== York Queen Street Works ===
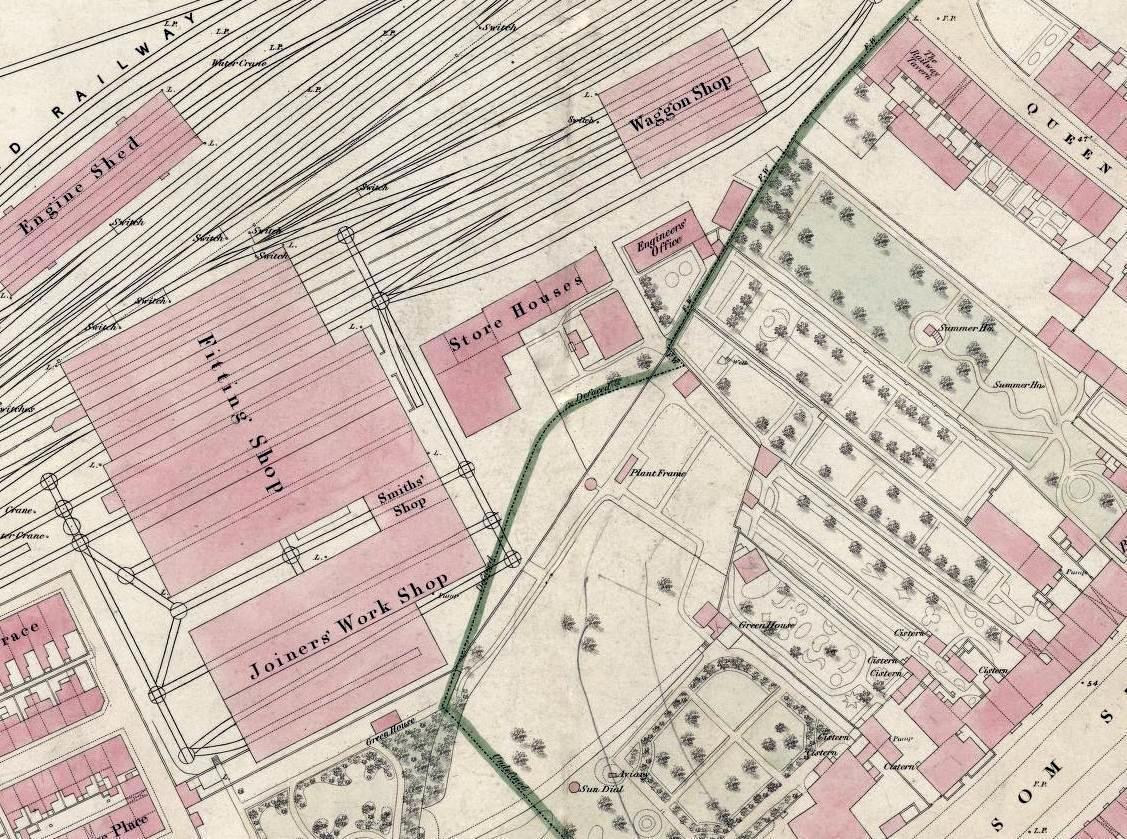
Queen Street Works c.1850 (left). South of York-Normanton mainline; green lines are boundaries

In 1839, a small repair shop was opened on Queen Street by the York and North Midland Railway. This expanded, and by 1849 it was repairing significant numbers of locomotives. In the early days of the railway engines, locomotives required more repairs as this was an emerging technology. Also, as the technology developed, many older locomotives were updated at this location. The work on engines was carried on in York until about 1905. The works also carried out construction and repair of carriages and wagons, and by 1864 was producing 100 wagons per week.

Most locomotives constructed on the site were put together by contractors rather than built by the York and North Midland Railway. The York and North Midland Railway was merged with several other railway companies to form the North Eastern Railway in 1853.

In 1865, the North Eastern Railway decided that the facilities for wagon production were outdated and a new facility was built adjacent to the freight avoiding line (see below).

The North Eastern Railway decided in the late 1870s to concentrate carriage building on a new site in York at Holgate Road (see below).

A plan of the site dated 1901, shows the various workshops on the site which included:

- Two erecting shops
- Patternmakers shop
- Paint shop
- Cylinder shop
- Fitting shop
- Machine shop
- Cylinder shop
- Coppersmiths shop
- Boiler shop
- Blacksmiths shop
- Foundry
- Brass finishers

There were also a number of stores, offices and boiler houses on the site.

Work on locomotive repairs continued until 1905. In conjunction with the re-modelling at the south end of York station in 1908/1909, the old boiler shop was converted into an engine shed and this site was then used by locomotives from visiting railways such as the Midland, Great Central and the Lancashire & Yorkshire Railway. A new 60-foot turntable was fitted at this time. With the grouping in 1923, Great Northern and Great Central locomotives were dealt with at York North (as they were both constituent parts of the London and North Eastern Railway).

During this period each company had a number of staff allocated to the depot. For instance, the Great Eastern Railway had a complement of seven staff in 1917 led by a boiler washer.

In 1925, after the centenary of the Stockton and Darlington Railway, the London & North Eastern Railway established a railway museum on the site using the former erecting shops. Remaining visiting LMS locomotives were thereafter dealt with at York South.

The railway museum closed in 1973 in preparation for the opening of the National Railway Museum in 1975.

The turntable still survived in 1976, but disappeared when the area was converted into car parking space.

Many of the buildings are still in existence on the site, including the main erecting shops, which are in use as a gym.

=== York Wagon Works ===
York Wagon Works was built by the North Eastern Railway in 1867, replacing a wagon shop on the Queen Street site. Wagon manufacturing ceased on the site in the 1960s.

As of 2011, the works have been used as a maintenance facility by Freightliner (UK).

=== York Carriage Works ===
The Holgate Road carriage works was constructed from 1880 as a planned expansion and replacement of the North Eastern Railway's Queen Street site; the factory began production in 1884 and was substantially expanded in 1897–1900, and saw further modernisations through the 21st century.

The works passed through the ownership of the NER – London & North Eastern Railway (1923), BR (British Railways (1948), British Rail Engineering Limited (1970) – and then were privatised and acquired by ABB in 1989.

The works closed in 1996, due to lack of orders caused by uncertainty in the post-privatisation of British Rail period. Thrall Car Manufacturing Company used the works to manufacture freight wagons for English Welsh & Scottish Railway from 1998 to 2002, after which the factory closed again. The works was later used by Network Rail as a base for its rail head treatment trains.

== Shunt turns ==
A shunt turn is the term for a duty covered by a shunting locomotive. Some shunt turns would have included trips between yards (known as transfer freights). Turns would have varied through the years, with some being 24-hour and others only for certain hours of the day. This section is being researched, but this is an indicative list of the locations around the York area where shunting locomotives would have worked. In 2012, York had no allocation of mainline shunting locomotives – any shunting is generally done by the train locomotive. The National Railway Museum does possess a Class 08 shunting locomotive and has used Class 02 and Class 03 locomotives for this duty in the past.

- York Station Pilots
- York Old Station Carriage Sidings
- York North Depot Pilot
- York South Depot Pilot
- Clifton Carriage Sheds
- York freight yards
- Dringhouses Up and Down Sidings
- Layerthorpe Goods Yards
- Rowntrees Trip
- Skelton Yard
- Carriage Works
- Wagon Works
- Branches yard
- Holgate Down Sidings

== Routes worked by York-based drivers (NER/LNER) ==
In steam days, York men worked no further north than Newcastle and typically south to Peterborough or Grantham on the ECML. The acceleration of services in the diesel era saw workings to London King's Cross begin as this could be achieved in a typical 8-hour shift.

On passenger workings, York drivers covered many of the local lines, including those to Bridlington, Hull (via Beverley), Scarborough and Whitby. They usually worked as far west as Leeds.

Goods workings took drivers a bit further and included Grimsby, Frodingham (Scunthorpe), Leicester, Colwick (near Nottingham), Manchester and Burton-on-Trent.

== Rowntrees ==
One of York's other famous industries is the production of chocolate, and the Rowntrees factory in York had a connection off the Foss Islands Branch Line. The factory also had a platform which was served by a train service up until closure on 8 July 1988. The site had an extensive rail network and had a number of steam and then diesel locomotives were employed. The factory, which still produces chocolate today as part of the Nestle group, opened in 1909 having relocated from a site in the city centre. At one point the factory had seven miles of track as well as a short 18-inch narrow gauge line.

The 1955 plan of the site shows the engine shed near the Haxby Road roundabout (East) side of the works, and according to the plan was a single-track affair. A new shed was built at the northern end of the site in 1964. This had two tracks, was of brick construction and had remotely operated doors and ventilator shutters.

The following locomotives are known to have worked on the site (although this list might be incomplete):

Number/Name	Wheel arrangement	Manufacturer/Built	Dates at factory	Notes
Marshall	0-4-0T	Unknown	1890–1895	Used in factory building phase. Steam Engine
Newton	0-4-0T	Hunslet/1889	1904–1959	Steam
2	0-4-0T	Barclay/1909	1909–1959	Steam
Swansea	0-4-0T	Hunslet/1909	1943–1959	Steam
3	0-4-0T	Hunslet/1915	1915–1959	Steam
1	0-4-0DE	Hudswell Clarke/1958	1958–1987	Diesel 165DE type – preserved on Kent and East Sussex Rly as no 41.
2	0-4-0DM	Ruston/1958	1958–1987	Diesel – 88DS class
3	0-4-0DM	Ruston/1960	1960–1987	Diesel . 88DS class – preserved NRM Shildon in 2012. 2013 onto private owners and preserved and running at the Derwent Valley Light Railway
4	0-6-0DH	Thomas Hill/1979	1979–1981	Diesel
PBA1935	0-6-0DE	Sentinel/?	1984–1986	Diesel – Hired in to cover whilst No 1 undergoing repairs

Study of aerial photographs and observation from public roads suggest that neither engine shed has survived.

== See also ==
- Malton engine shed
- Pickering engine shed
- Whitby engine shed
