= NER Class D =

Class of British steam locomotives

NER Class D; LNER Class H1
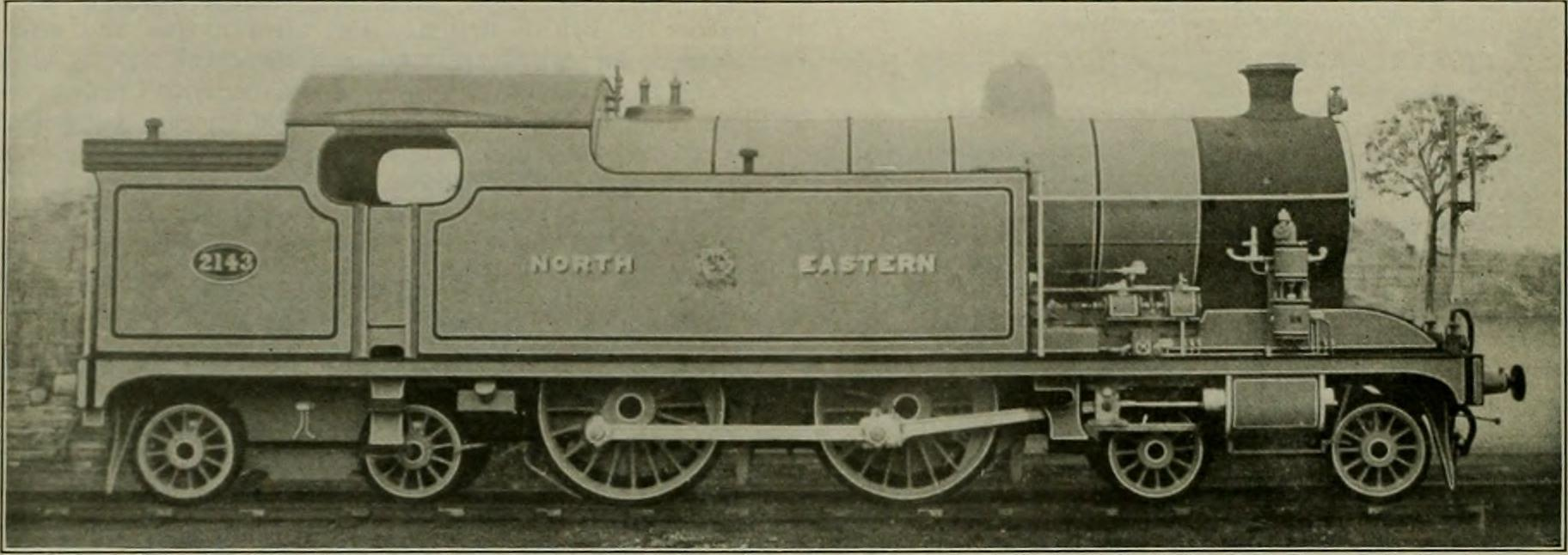
Type and origin
- Power type: Steam
- Designer: Vincent Raven
- Builder: NER Darlington
- Build date: 1913, 1920—1922
- Total produced: 45
Specifications
- Configuration
  - Whyte: 4-4-4T
- Gauge: 4 ft 8 1/2 in (1,435 mm) standard gauge
- Leading dia.: 3 ft 1 1/4 in (0.946 m)
- Driver dia.: 5 ft 9 in (1.753 m)
- Trailing dia.: 3 ft 1 1/4 in (0.946 m)
- Wheelbase: 34 ft 6 in (10.52 m)
- Loco weight: 87.35 long tons (88.75 t; 97.83 short tons)
- Fuel type: Coal
- Fuel capacity: 4 long tons (4.1 t; 4.5 short tons)
- Water cap.: 2,000 imp gal (9,100 L; 2,400 US gal)
- Firebox
  - Grate area: 23 sq ft (2.1 m^{2})
- Boiler pressure: 160 psi (1.1 MPa)
- Heating surface
  - Firebox: 124 sq ft (11.5 m^{2})
  - Tubes: 654.24 sq ft (60.781 m^{2})
  - Flues: 280.6 sq ft (26.07 m^{2})
  - Total surface: 1,252.974 sq ft (116.4051 m^{2})
- Superheater
  - Type: Schmidt
  - Heating area: 194.13 sq ft (18.035 m^{2})
- Cylinders: three
- Cylinder size: 16 1/2 in × 26 in (419 mm × 660 mm)
- Valve gear: Stephenson
Performance figures
- Tractive effort: 22,940 lbf (102.0 kN)
Career
- Operators: North Eastern Railway, London and North Eastern Railway
- Retired: 1931-1936
- Disposition: All rebuilt to LNER Class A8

The North Eastern Railway Class D (later London and North Eastern Railway (LNER) Class H1) was a class of 4-4-4T three-cylinder side tank steam locomotive designed by Vincent Raven in 1913. They were used for rural passenger services. Forty five were built in total; a first batch of twenty, then a further twenty five after the War.

Between 1931 and 1936, all of the LNER H1 class were rebuilt with a 4-6-2T wheel layout and re-classified as A8. They were scrapped between 1957 and 1960.
