= 4-4-4 =

Locomotive wheel arrangement

4-4-4 (Reading/Jubilee)

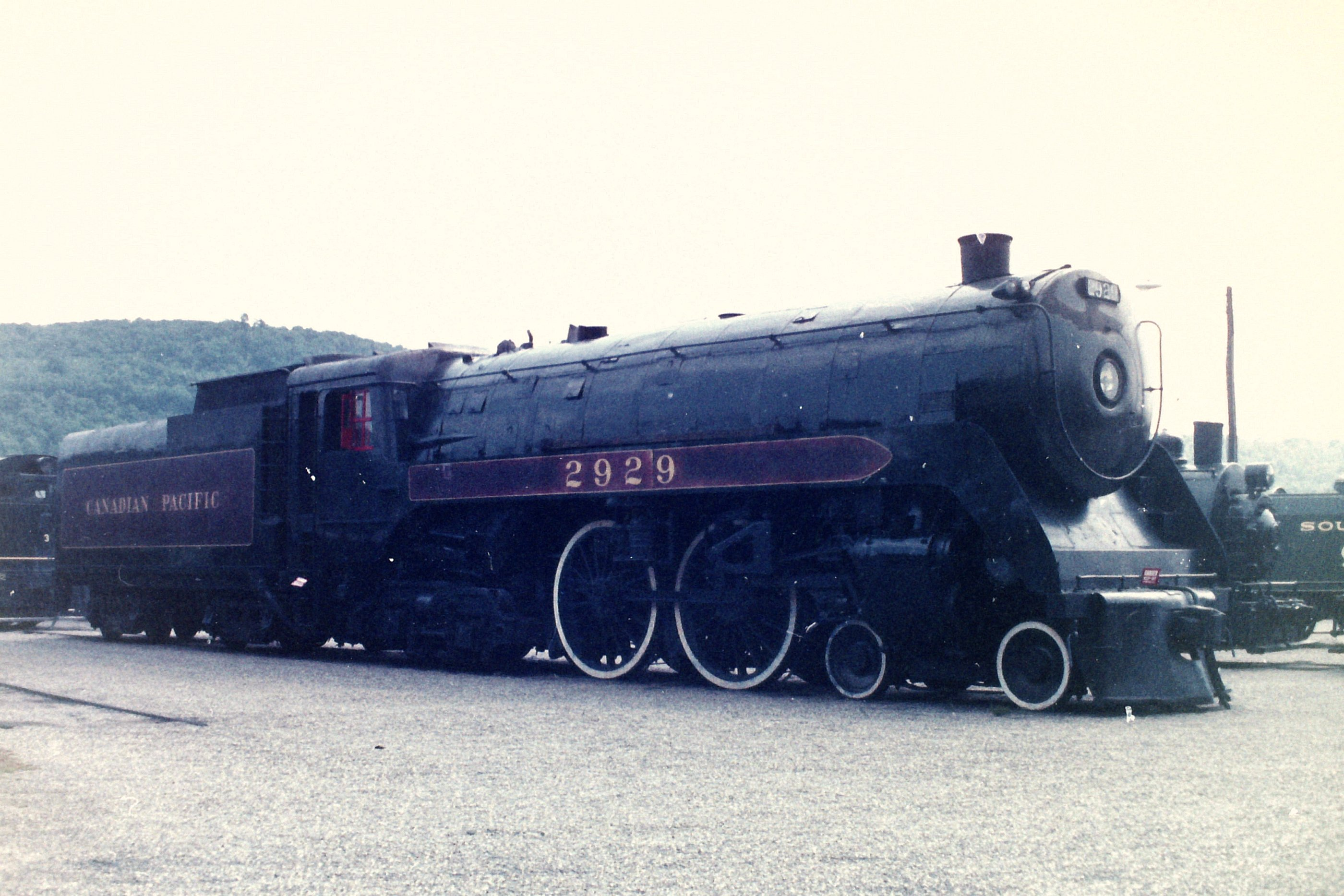
- Canadian Pacific 4-4-4 Jubilee locomotive No. 2929 on display at Steamtown, U.S.A. in August 1970.
Equivalent classifications
- UIC class: 2B2
- French class: 222
- Turkish class: 26
- Swiss class: 2/6
- Russian class: 2-2-2
First known tender engine version
- First use: 1906
- Country: Kingdom of Bavaria
- Locomotive: Bavarian S 2/6
- Railway: Royal Bavarian State Railways
- Designer: Maffei
- Builder: Maffei
- Evolved from: 4-4-2

Under the Whyte notation for the classification of steam locomotives, The 4-4-4 Reading or Jubilee Type represents the wheel arrangement of four leading wheels on two axles, four powered and coupled driving wheels on two axles, and four trailing wheels on two axles. In the United States, this arrangement was named the Reading type, since the Philadelphia and Reading Railroad was the first to use it. In Canada, this type is known as the Jubilee.

Other equivalent classifications are:

- UIC classification: 2B2 (also known as German classification and Italian classification)
- French classification: 222
- Turkish classification: 26
- Swiss classification: 2/6

== Usage ==
=== Bavarian Railways ===
A single, experimental 4-4-4, classified as S 2/6, was built for the Royal Bavarian State Railways in 1906 by Maffei. It was successful in an experimental sense, but was too light to haul passenger trains of useful capacity. It was fast, attaining 154 km/h (96 mph) on test, and was semi-streamlined with a pointed nosecone and fairings around the cylinders, stack and dome, and slanted-back cab windows. It inspired the later Bavarian S 3/6 4-6-2 "Pacifics". It passed to the Deutsche Reichseisenbahnen when the German railways were centralised, and was classified as BR 15, number 15 001. It was taken out of service in 1925, and was restored by Maffei to be exhibited at the Munich Transport Exhibition of that year. After the exhibition ended, it was placed in the Nuremberg Transport Museum, where it remains.

=== Reading Railroad ===
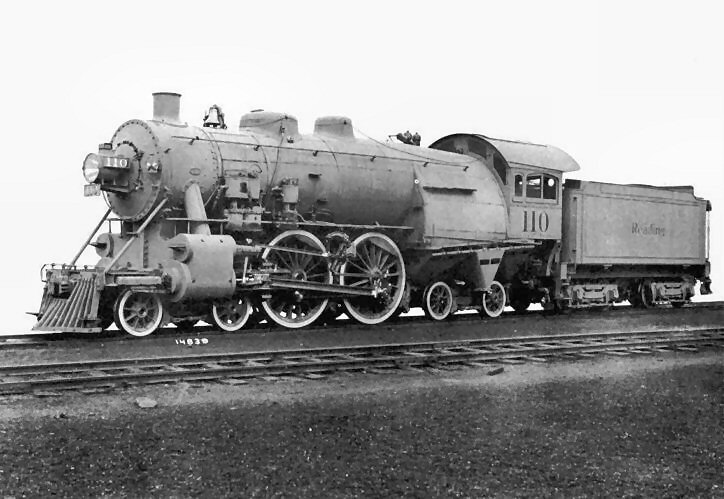
Reading No. 110 in its official portrait.

The Philadelphia and Reading Railway built four C1a Class locomotives in 1915, numbered 110 to 113. They proved to be quite unstable; after that year, they were rebuilt to 4-4-2 "Atlantic" locomotives, classified as P7sa, and renumbered 350 to 353.

=== Baltimore & Ohio ===
Baltimore and Ohio Class J1 Lady Baltimore 4-4-4 Type steam locomotive
Type and origin
- Builder: Baltimore and Ohio Railroad
- Build date: 1900s (4-4-2) 1934 (rebuilt as 4-4-4)
- Total produced: 1
Specifications
Career
- Operators: Baltimore and Ohio Railroad
- Numbers: 1 (B&O); original number unknown
- Disposition: Scrapped in 1949

In 1934 the Baltimore and Ohio Railroad built a single class J-1 4-4-4 out of a 4-4-2 from the early 1900s, named Lady Baltimore. This locomotive and the lone V-2 4-6-4 Lord Baltimore were built for new lightweight passenger trains, in the former's case the Abraham Lincoln on the Chicago and Alton Railroad, a wholly owned subsidiary of the B&O. Despite the Alton's flat territory and straight track, the locomotive performed poorly. It was returned to the B&O and was modified at the railroad's Mount Clare shops with a less streamlined cab and front end. It was then placed into local service on the railroad's Wheeling Division, mostly operating between Holloway and Cleveland, Ohio. It proved no more successful than before and was sent to the B&O's Riverside Shop for storage, being scrapped in 1949.

=== Canadian Pacific ===
Canadian Pacific F2a and F1a "Jubilee" 4-4-4 Jubilee Type steam locomotives
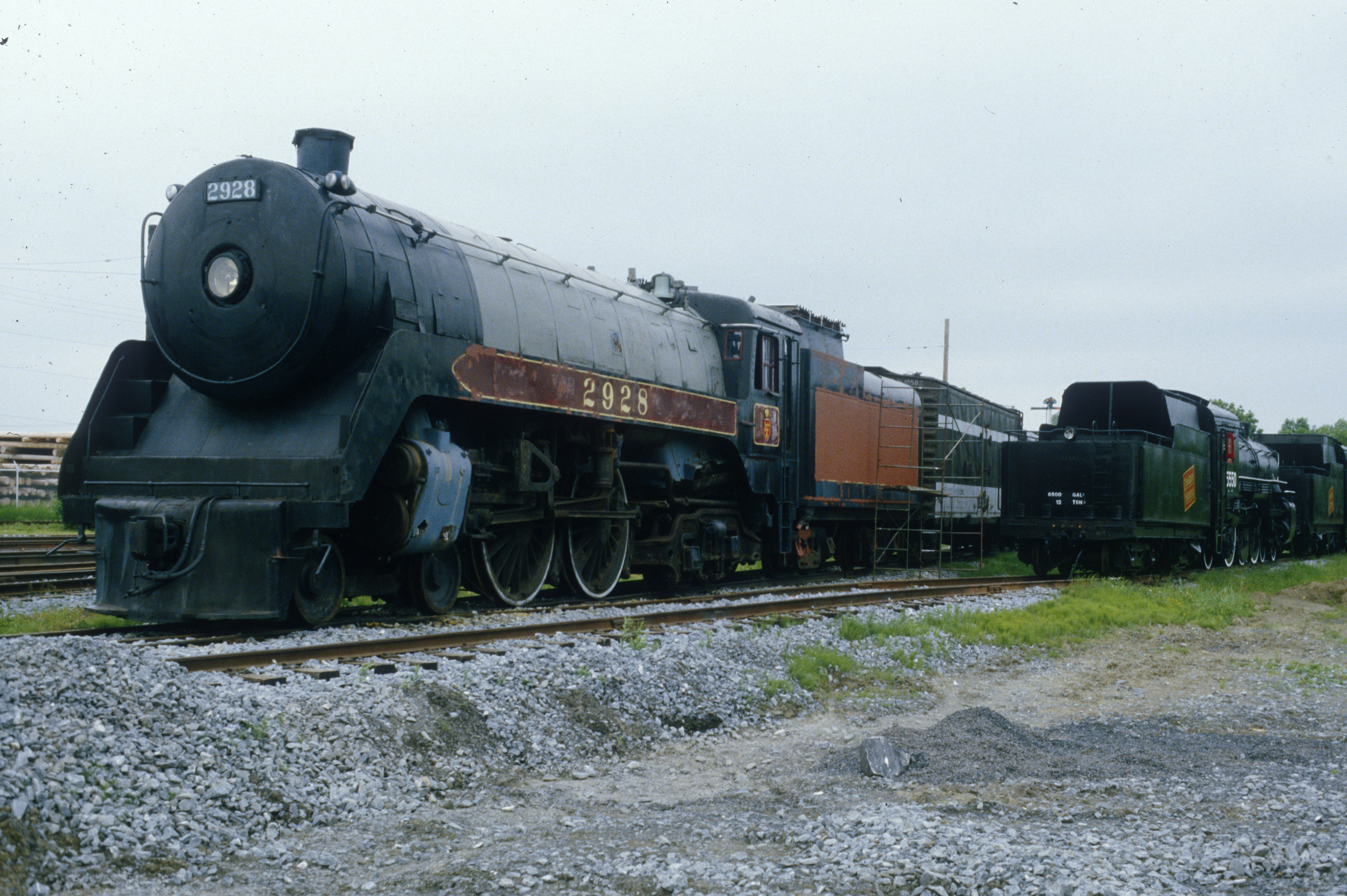
- Canadian Pacific Railway class F1a "Jubilee" No. 2928
Type and origin
- Builder: Canadian Locomotive Company Montreal Locomotive Works
- Build date: 1936-1937
- Total produced: 25
Specifications
- Configuration
  - Whyte: 4-4-4
Career
- Operators: Canadian Pacific Railway
- Numbers: 2910-2929, 3000-3004
- Disposition: 1 preserved in Canada and 1 preserved in the US, remainder scrapped in 1957

The Canadian Pacific Railway built two Jubilee F classes locomotives, totaling 25 in all. They were built by the Montreal Locomotive Works and the Canadian Locomotive Company in 1936 and 1937. Both were semi-streamlined similarly to the 4-6-4 "Royal Hudson" and 2-10-4 "Selkirk" locomotives but much smaller. The F2a was styled after the Milwaukee Road's 4-4-2 Class A "Hiawatha", but with a four-wheel trailing truck to support a longer firebox.

The Canadian Pacific Class F2a had 5 locomotives, Nos. 3000-3004. The most noticeable difference from the F1a is their main rods being connected to the lead driving axle. There were some problems with this, as they tended to bend the main rods when reversing. The pilot was smoothly rounded and streamlined with two stainless-steel bands. One of them managed to reach 112.5 mph (181.1 km/h) during a braking test, a record for Canadian steam. All of this group were scrapped.

The Canadian Pacific Class F1a had 20 locomotives, Nos. 2910-2929. Their main rods were connected to the rear drivers, and a more conventional pilot and straight pilot beam, a drop-coupler sheet steel pilot below that, and a more conventional front deck. Two of the class, Nos. 2928 and 2929, are preserved. No. 2928 is at the Canadian Railway Museum in Delson, Quebec, while No. 2929 is at Steamtown National Historic Site in Scranton, Pennsylvania.

=== Britain ===
In Britain the 4-4-4 arrangement was confined to tank locomotives and there to specific applications requiring either high speed stability in both directions (created by a symmetrical arrangement with bogies front and rear) or a powerful locomotive with as short a fixed wheelbase as possible. Eric G. Barker designed three examples for the Wirral Railway in 1896. The Midland and South Western Junction Railway purchased two 4-4-4 tank engines from Sharp, Stewart and Company but these were not a success due to their poor traction. The North Eastern Railway Class D was designed by Vincent Raven in 1913. Between 1931 and 1936 they were rebuilt with a 4-6-2T wheel layout and re-classified as A8. The H Class locomotives built for the Metropolitan Railway in the 1920s are an example of both these factors leading to a rare use of the 4-4-4 arrangement.

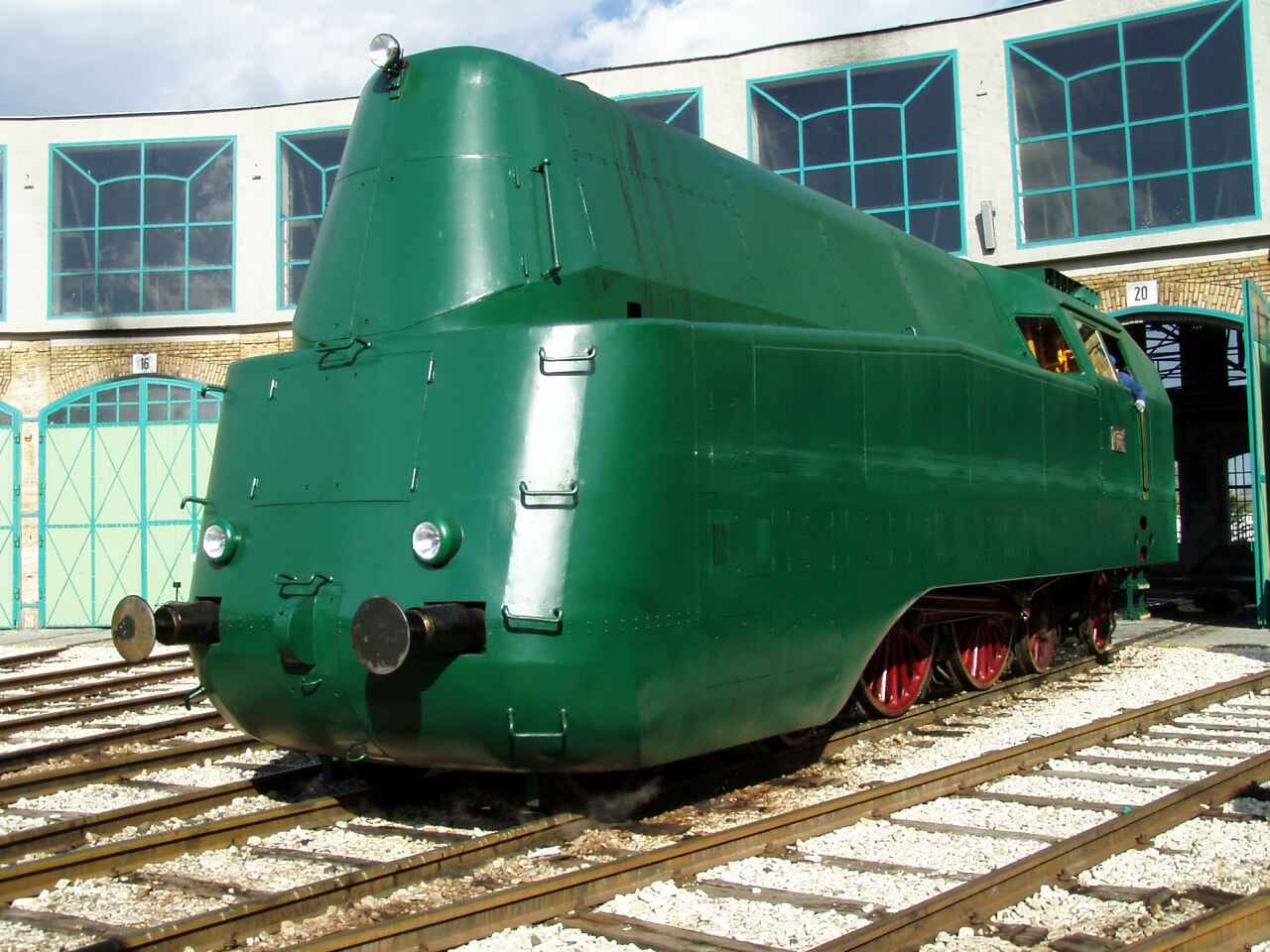
242.001 at the Hungarian Railway Museum

=== Australia ===
The Western Australia Government Railway N Class 4-4-4 tank locomotives were introduced in 1896.

=== Hungary ===
MÁVAG introduced some MÁV Class 242 4-4-4 streamlined tank locomotives between 1936 and 1939.

=== India ===
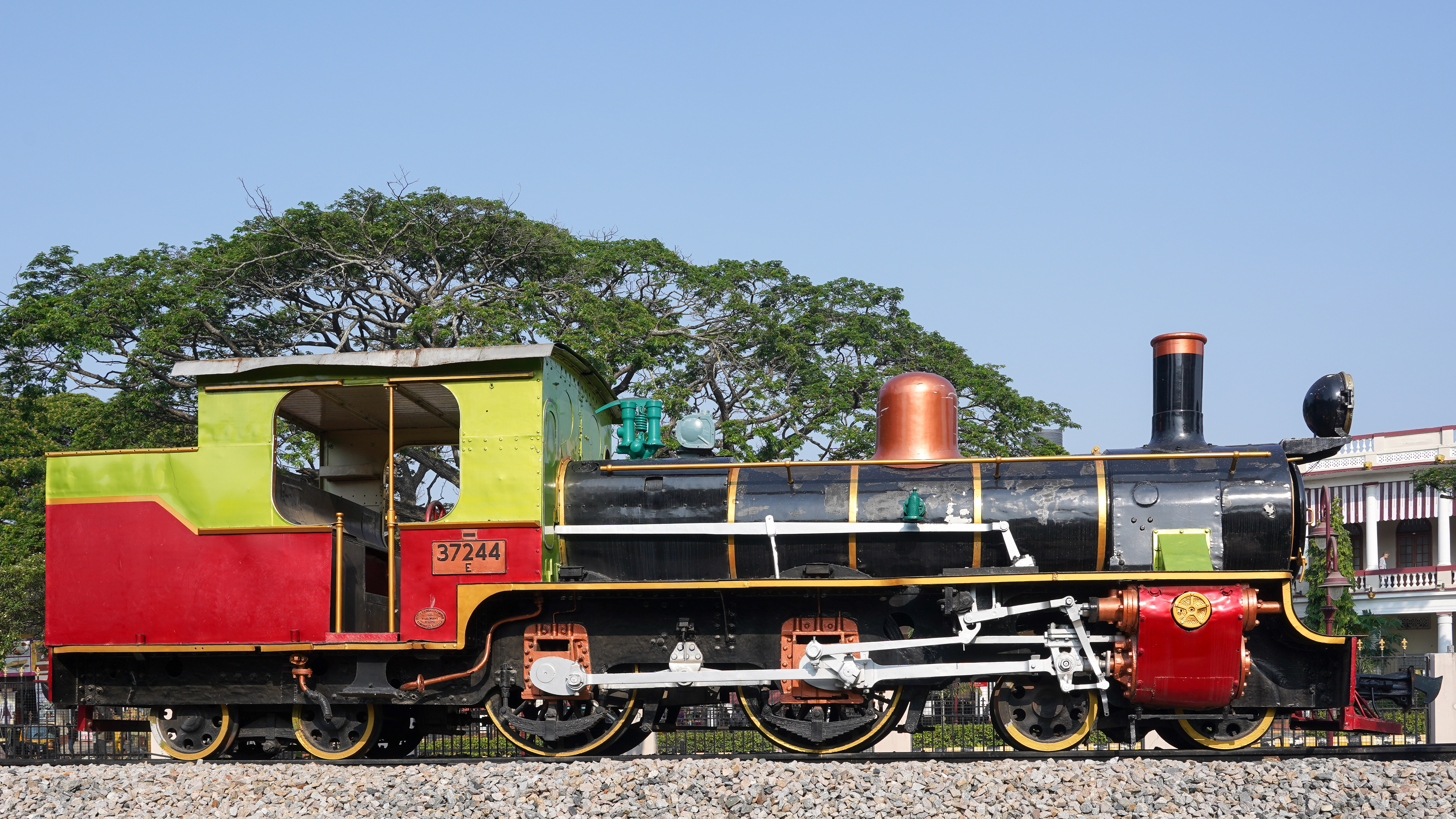
No. 22782, Railway Museum, Mysore, India (ca. Apr 2022)

The Vishveshwaraiah Iron and Steel Company, Bhadravati introduced a Class-E 4-4-4 tank engine in March 1921. No. 22782 was built by the North British Locomotive Company at Atlas Works, Glasgow in 1920, the first of 23 examples. It is currently exhibited in the Railway Museum in the Mysore Junction railway station.

=== Uruguay ===
The "D type" 4-4-4T of the Central Uruguay Railway were eight locomotives (Vulcan Foundry 1913 and 1915) for use in the suburban services around Montevideo Central Station.

=== Venezuela ===
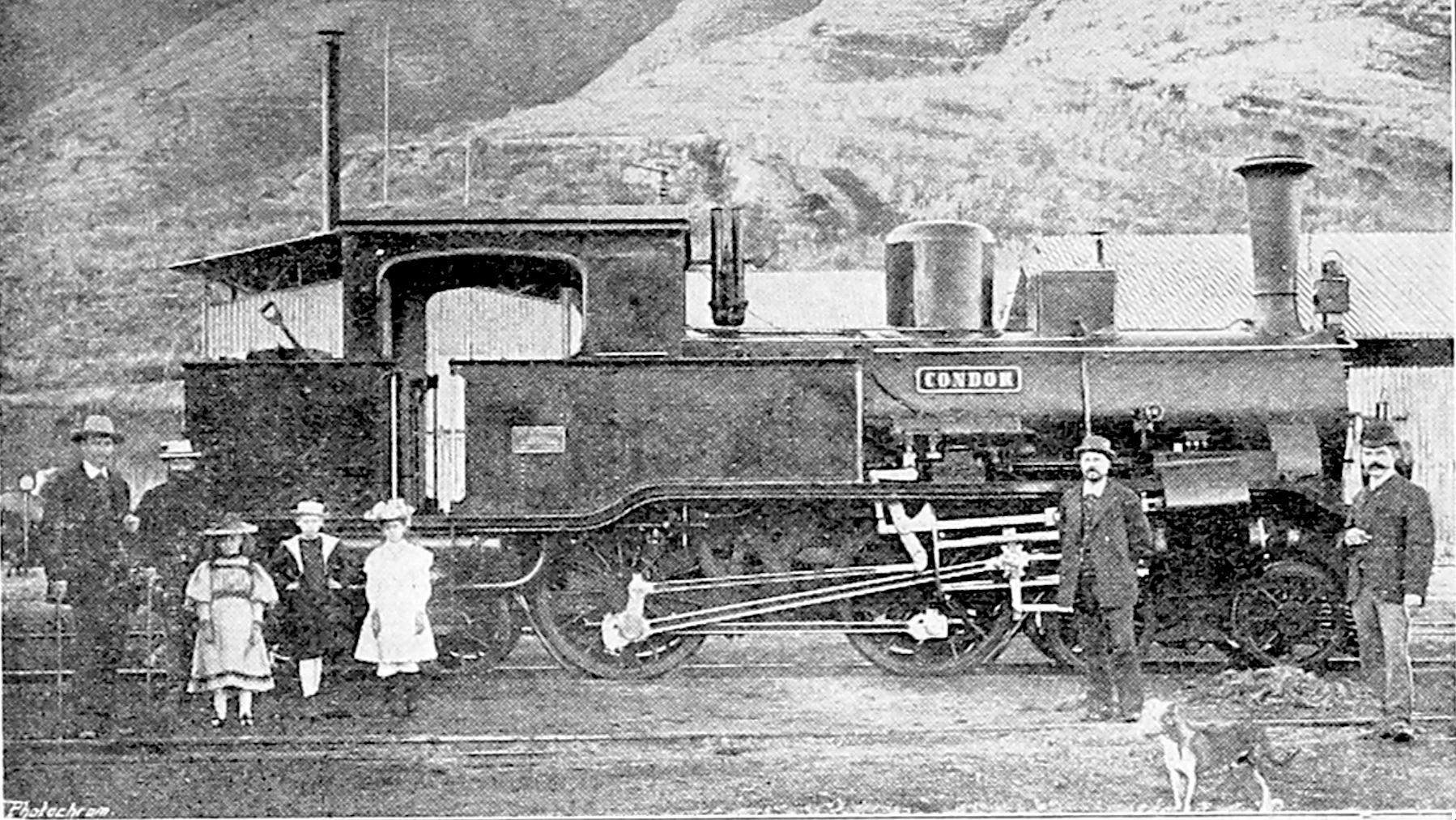
4-4-4T Cóndor of the Gran Ferrocarril de Venezuela in 1901

The 3 ft 6 in (1,067 mm) gauge Gran Ferrocarril de Venezuela (Great Venezuela Railway) acquired a class of three 4-4-4T locomotives in 1892, the Cóndor, Gavilán and Halcón. They were built by Hartmann's Sächsische Maschinenfabrik in Chemnitz, Germany. Their maximum speed was 70 km/h (43 mph).

Halcón still exists and, after an overhaul in 1975, was in service on a heritage line until 1997. Today it is in a desolate condition.

== See more ==
- Ehrenreich, Thomas. 1915 Reading Company Locomotive 110. Retrieved on May 18, 2005.
- Barris, Wes. SteamLocomotive.com: Surviving Streamlined Steam. Retrieved on May 18, 2005.
- "Canadian Pacific Railway No. 2929". Steamtown NHS Special History Study. Archived from the original on May 19, 2007.
- Wilbrink, Joost. "BR 15". dbtrains.com.
