= NER Class W1 =

Class of British 4-6-2T steam locomotives

NER Class W1 LNER Class A6
Type and origin
- Power type: Steam
- Designer: Wilson Worsdell / Vincent Raven
- Builder: Gateshead Works
- Build date: 1907–1908
- Total produced: 10
- Rebuild date: 1914–1917
- Number rebuilt: 10
Specifications
- Configuration
  - Whyte: 4-6-2T
  - UIC: 2′C1′ n2t / 2′C1′ h2t
- Gauge: 4 ft 8 1/2 in (1,435 mm)
- Leading dia.: 3 ft 1 1/4 in (0.946 m)
- Driver dia.: 5 ft 1 1/4 in (1.556 m)
- Trailing dia.: 3 ft 9 1/4 in (1.149 m)
- Length: 43 ft 10 3/4 in (13.379 m)
- Loco weight: Saturated: 78.00 long tons (79.25 t; 87.36 short tons); Superheated: 79.00 long tons (80.27 t; 88.48 short tons)
- Fuel type: Coal
- Fuel capacity: 4.00 long tons (4.06 t; 4.48 short tons)
- Water cap.: 1,893 imp gal (8,610 L; 2,273 US gal)
- Firebox
  - Grate area: 23 sq ft (2.1 m^{2})
- Boiler pressure: 175 lbf/in^{2} (1.21 MPa)
- Cylinders: Two, inside
- Cylinder size: 19 in × 26 in (483 mm × 660 mm)
- Valve gear: Stephenson
- Valve type: 8 3/4-inch (222 mm) piston valves
Performance figures
- Tractive effort: 22,830 lbf (101.55 kN)
Career
- Operators: North Eastern Railway; London and North Eastern Railway; British Railways
- Power class: BR: 4P
- Axle load class: LNER/BR: Route availability 4
- Withdrawn: 1947–1953
- Disposition: All scrapped

The NER Class W1 was a 4-6-2T steam locomotive of the North Eastern Railway. The class was introduced in 1914 as a rebuild of Wilson Worsdell's NER Class W 4-6-0T (introduced 1907). At the 1923 Grouping, they all passed to the London and North Eastern Railway, who placed them in their Class A6.

== Modifications ==
Seven of the locomotives were fitted with superheaters between 1937 and 1944.

== British Railways ==
One locomotive was withdrawn in 1947 but the remaining nine passed to British Railways in 1948 and were numbered as follows:

- Superheated: 69791-69793 and 69796-69797
- Non-superheated: 69794-69795 and 69798

== Withdrawal ==
One locomotive was withdrawn in 1947 and the others had all been withdrawn by the end of 1951. None are preserved.

Table of locomotives
NER no.	Date rebuilt	Date superheated	LNER 1946 No.	BR No.	Date withdrawn	Notes
686	May 1915	May 1944	9790	—	Jun 1947	
687	Jan 1917	May 1943	9791	69791	Aug 1951	
688	Sep 1914	Dec 1944	9792	69792	Feb 1948	Withdrawn before BR number applied
689	May 1915	Aug 1937	9793	69793	Apr 1951	
690	Aug 1916	—	9794	69794	Aug 1951	
691	Jun 1915	—	9795	69795	Jul 1950	
692	May 1916	Sep 1937	9796	69796	Mar 1953	
693	Feb 1916	Jan 1937	9797	69797	Aug 1951	
694	May 1915	—	9798	69798	Feb 1951	
695	Jul 1915	Jan 1937	9799	69799	Feb 1950	Withdrawn before BR number applied
